= Vladimir Horowitz discography =

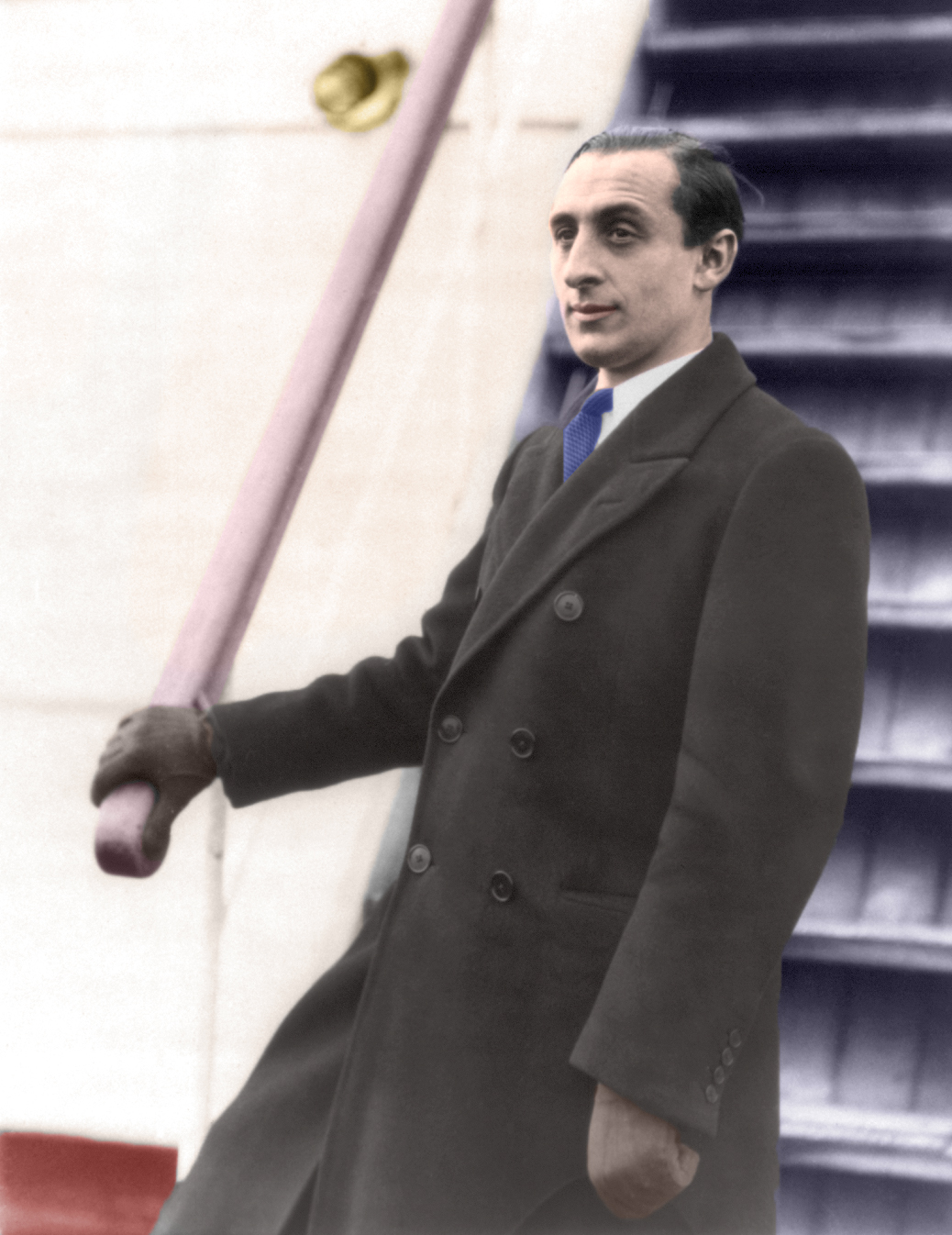
Vladimir Horowitz in 1931

The Russian and American classical virtuoso pianist Vladimir Horowitz was a recording artist for over 60 years, beginning in 1926 on a piano roll system for Welte-Mignon, then with audio recordings, starting in 1928 for the Victor Talking Machine Company, later RCA Victor. Horowitz continued to record for a variety of record labels throughout his life. Between 1962 and 1973, he recorded for Columbia Masterworks In 1975, he returned to RCA, with which he recorded a series of live recitals. For the last years of his life, between 1985 and 1989, Horowitz recorded for Deutsche Grammophon. His final recording, with Sony Classical, was completed in November 1989, four days before his death. This final recording consisted of repertoire that he had never previously recorded. His discography contains numerous albums and compilations of works by a variety of composers. Horowitz has also appeared in several video items, most of which were produced in the later years of his life.

== Overview ==
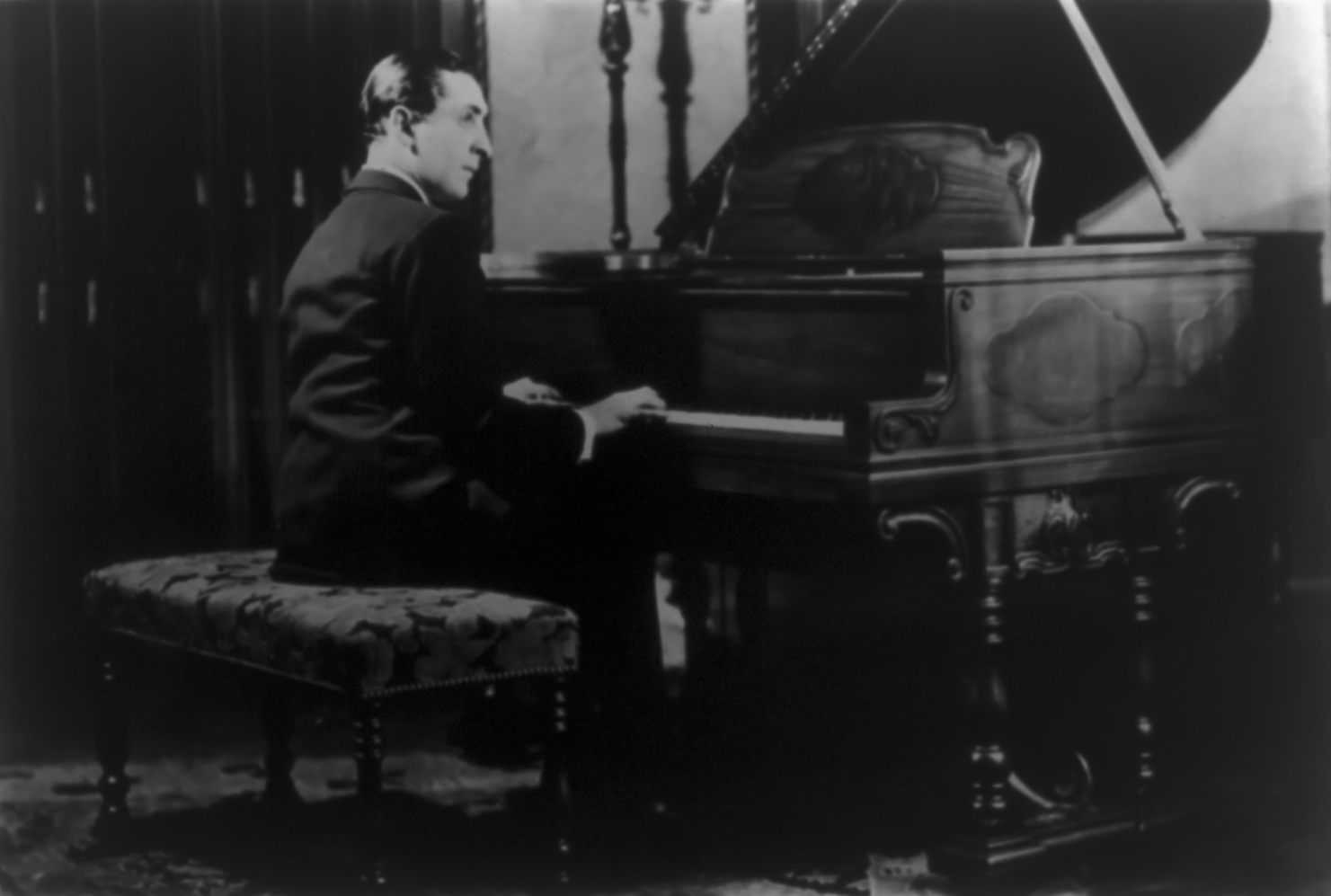
Horowitz at the time of his first recordings

Horowitz's first recordings were made in 1926, on piano rolls at the Welte-Mignon studios in Freiburg im Breisgau, Germany. He also recorded piano rolls for Aeolian. His first audio recordings were made in the United States during 1928 for the Victor Talking Machine Company, Because of a reduction of recording activities due to the economic impact of the Great Depression, RCA Victor agreed to allow its recording artists' European-produced recordings to be made by His Master's Voice, RCA Victor's London-based affiliate. Horowitz's first European recording, in 1930, was of Rachmaninoff's Piano Concerto No. 3 with Albert Coates and the London Symphony Orchestra, the world premiere recording of that piece. Through 1936, Horowitz continued to make recordings for His Master's Voice of solo piano repertoire, including his 1932 account of Liszt's Sonata in B minor. Beginning in 1940, Horowitz's recording activity was again concentrated in the U.S. That year, he recorded Brahms' Piano Concerto No. 2, and in 1941, Tchaikovsky's Piano Concerto No. 1, both with Arturo Toscanini and the NBC Symphony Orchestra. With the creation of the modern LP record in 1948, many of his older recordings were reissued in the new format and some items received multiple reissues. During Horowitz's second retirement, which began in 1953, he made a series of recordings for RCA Victor in his New York townhouse, including LPs of Scriabin and Clementi. Horowitz's first stereo recording, made by RCA Victor in 1959, was devoted to two of Beethoven's piano sonatas.

In 1962, Horowitz embarked on a series of highly acclaimed recordings for Columbia Masterworks, which was later renamed to Sony Classical after the label was acquired by Sony in 1990. The most famous among them are his 1965 return concert at Carnegie Hall and a 1968 recording from his television special, Vladimir Horowitz: A Concert at Carnegie Hall, televised by CBS. Horowitz also continued to make studio recordings, including a 1969 recording of Kreisleriana by Robert Schumann, which was awarded the Prix Mondial du Disque. All of Horowitz's Columbia recordings were released as a 13-CD set by Sony Masterworks in 1993. In 1975, Horowitz returned to RCA, releasing a series of live recordings until 1982. During this period, Columbia also repackaged their Horowitz recordings with reissues including the named Beethoven Sonatas and multiple-LP sets of Chopin. In 1985, Horowitz signed with Deutsche Grammophon, and made both studio and live recordings until 1989, including his only recording of Mozart's Piano Concerto No. 23. Four filmed documents were made during this time, including the telecast of his April 20, 1986 Moscow recital. His final recording, for Sony Classical, was completed four days before his death and consisted of repertoire he had never previously recorded.

With the advent of the compact disc, the various labels for which Horowitz recorded began reissuing his pre-digital recordings. This began in the mid-1980s and increased in the years immediately following Horowitz's death. Beginning in 1987, Columbia issued single-composer compilations drawn from various albums. RCA Victor issued many of Horowitz's recordings on their Gold Seal mid-priced label. By 1993, both Columbia's and RCA's entire cache of previously issued recordings was available on CD, including several older items which had never appeared on LP. A number of items were issued more than once, including the 1978 recording of Rachmaninoff's Piano Concerto No. 3 which was issued on CD in 1987, again in 1993, with a new cover, and in a new remastering in 2000. Over the past two decades, several previously unavailable Horowitz recordings have been issued. These include studio and live recordings from the Columbia era, and a collection from Carnegie Hall recitals between 1945 and 1951 which were recorded privately by Horowitz. In addition, several smaller labels have issued CDs made from bootleg recordings from the 1960s onward and several of Horowitz's stereo recordings have been issued in the blu-spec and SHM-CD (Super High Material) formats.

The listing below only contains CD releases, and does not contain 78 rpm, LP, cassette, or 8-track tape releases. The videography includes items which have been released on VHS, Laserdisc and DVD.

== Albums ==
Year of issue	Album details	Recording date(s)	Record label
1982	Horowitz At the Met: Scarlatti: Six Sonatas; Chopin: Ballade in F minor, Op. 52 / Waltz in A-flat major, Op. 69, No. 1; Liszt: Ballade in B minor, S. 171; Rachmaninoff: Prelude in G minor, Op. 23, No. 5	November 1981	RCA Red Seal Records
1983	Horowitz in London: Traditional: God Save the Queen; Chopin: Polonaise-Fantasie, Op. 61 / Ballade in G minor, Op. 23; Schumann: Kinderszenen, Op. 15; Scriabin: Etude in D-sharp minor, Op. 8, No. 12	May 1982	RCA Red Seal Records
1985	Vladimir Horowitz – The Last Romantic: Bach–Busoni: Chorale Prelude "Nun komm' der Heiden Heiland"; Mozart: Sonata in C major, K. 330; Chopin: Mazurka in A minor, Op. 17, No. 4 / Scherzo in B minor, Op. 20 / Polonaise in A-flat major, Op. 53; Schubert: Impromptu in A-flat major, D. 899, No. 4; Liszt: Consolation No. 3 in D-flat major, S. 172, No. 3; Schumann: Novelette in F major, Op. 21, No. 1; Scriabin: Etude in C-sharp minor, Op. 2, No. 1; Rachmaninoff: Prelude in G-sharp minor, Op. 32, No. 12; Moszkowski: Etude in F major, Op. 72, No. 6	April 1985	Deutsche Grammophon
1986	The Studio Recordings, New York 1985: Schumann: Kreisleriana, Op. 16; Scarlatti: Sonata in B minor, K. 87 / Sonata in E major, K. 135; Liszt: Impromptu (Nocturne), in F-sharp major / Valse oubliée No. 1; Scriabin: Etude in D-sharp minor, Op. 8, No. 12; Schubert: Impromptu in B-flat major, D. 935, No. 3; Schubert-Tausig: Marche Militaire in D-flat major	September – October 1985	Deutsche Grammophon
1986	Horowitz in Moscow: Scarlatti: Sonata in E major, K. 380; Mozart: Sonata in C major, K. 330; Rachmaninoff: Prelude in G major, Op. 32, No. 5 / Prelude in G-sharp minor, Op. 32, No. 12 / Polka de W. R.; Scriabin: Etude in C-sharp minor, Op. 2, No. 1 / Etude in D-sharp minor, Op. 8, No. 12; Liszt: Soirées de Vienne, Valse Caprice No. 6 (after Schubert) / Sonetto del Petrarca No. 104; Chopin: Mazurka in C-sharp minor, Op. 30, No. 4 / Mazurka in F minor, Op. 7, No. 3; Schumann: Träumerei; Moszkowski: Étincelles, Op. 36, No. 6	April 1986	Deutsche Grammophon
1987	Horowitz Plays Mozart: Piano Concerto No. 23 in A major, K. 488 (Orchestra della Teatro alla Scala / Carlo Maria Giulini, Conductor); Sonata in B-flat major, K. 333	March 1987	Deutsche Grammophon
1987	Horowitz Plays Liszt: Sonata in B minor, S. 178 / Ballade in B minor, S. 171 / Funerailles, S. 173, No. 7 / Consolation in D-flat major, S. 172, No. 3 / Mephisto Waltz No. 1, S. 514 (arr. Horowitz)	1950–1981	RCA Red Seal Records
1989	Horowitz At Home: Mozart: Sonata in B-flat, K. 281 / Adagio in B minor, K. 540 / Rondo in D major, K. 485; Schubert: Moment musical in F minor, D. 80, No. 3; Liszt: Ständchen / Soirées de Vienne, Valse Caprices Nos. 6 and 7 (all after Schubert)	1986–1989	Deutsche Grammophon
1989	Horowitz Plays Rachmaninoff: Piano Sonata No. 2 in B-flat minor, Op. 36 / Moment Musical in E-flat minor, Op. 16 No. 2 / Prelude in G major, Op. 32, No. 5 / Polka de W. R. in A-flat major; Piano Concerto No. 3 in D minor, Op. 30 (RCA Victor Symphony Orchestra / Fritz Reiner, Conductor)	1951–1980	RCA Gold Seal
1989	Horowitz Plays Clementi: Sonata in C major, Op. 33 No. 3 / Sonata in G minor, Op. 34 No. 2 / Sonata in F minor, Op. 13 No. 6 / Sonata in F-sharp minor, Op. 25 No. 5 / Rondo from Sonata in B-flat major, Op. 24 No. 2	1954	RCA Gold Seal
1989	Horowitz Plays Scriabin: Sonatas: No. 3 in F-sharp minor, Op. 23 / No. 5, Op. 53; Preludes: Op. 11, Nos. 1, 3, 9, 10, 13, 14, 16 / Op. 13, No. 6 / Op. 15, No. 2 / Op. 16, Nos. 1, 4 / Op. 27, No. 1 / Op. 48, No. 3 / Op. 51, No. 2 / Op. 59, No. 2 / Op. 67, No. 1; Etudes: Op. 8, Nos. 7, 12 / Op. 42, No. 5	1953–1982	RCA Gold Seal
1989	Horowitz Plays Schumann: Sonata in F minor, Op. 14 (Concerto without Orchestra) / Humoreske, Op. 20 / Fantasiestücke, Op. 12 / Nachtstücke, Op. 23, Nos. 3 & 4	1976–1980	RCA Gold Seal
1989	Horowitz In Concert 1967–1968: Scarlatti: Sonata in F-sharp major, K. 319 / Sonata in G major, K. 260; Haydn: Sonata No. 48 in C major; Beethoven: Sonata in A major, Op. 101; Liszt: Scherzo and March, S. 177; Mendelssohn: Etude in A minor, Op. 104b, No. 3	1967–1968	CBS Masterworks
1989	Mozart: Piano Sonatas: Piano Sonata in B-flat major, K. 281 / Piano Sonata in C major, K. 330 / Piano Sonata in B-flat major, K. 333 / Adagio in B minor, K. 540 / Rondo in D major, K. 485	1980–1988	Deutsche Grammophon
1990	Horowitz Plays Brahms & Beethoven: Scarlatti: Sonata in E major, K. 380; Bach–Busoni: Chorale Prelude Nun komm' der Heiden Heiland – Come, Redeemer; Haydn: Sonata in E-flat major, Hob. XVI: 52; Beethoven: Moonlight Sonata; Brahms: Violin Sonata, Op. 108 (Nathan Milstein, Violin); Schumann: Träumerei	1946–1951	RCA Gold Seal
1990	Horowitz Plays Prokofiev, Barber & Kabalevsky Sonatas: Prokofiev: Sonata No. 7 in B-flat major, Op. 83 / Toccata, Op. 11; Barber: Sonata, Op. 26; Kabalevsky: Sonata No. 3 in F major, Op. 46; Fauré: Nocturne in B minor, Op. 119; Poulenc: Presto in B-flat major, FP 70	1945–1977	RCA Gold Seal
1990	Horowitz Plays Beethoven Sonatas: Sonata in F minor, Op. 57 “Appassionata” / Sonata in C-sharp minor, Op. 27, No. 2 “Moonlight” / Sonata in C major, Op. 53 “Waldstein”	1956–1959	RCA Gold Seal
1990	Horowitz Plays Tchaikovsky: Concerto No. 1 and Beethoven: Concerto No. 5 "Emperor": Tchaikovsky: Piano Concerto in B-flat minor, Op. 23 (NBC Symphony Orchestra / Arturo Toscanini, Conductor); Beethoven: Piano Concerto in E-flat major, Op. 73 "Emperor" (RCA Victor Symphony Orchestra / Fritz Reiner, Conductor)	1943, 1951	RCA Gold Seal
1990	Horowitz – The Last Recording: Haydn: Sonata No. 49 in E-flat major; Chopin: Mazurka in C minor, Op. 56, No. 3 / Nocturne E-flat major, Op. 55, No. 2 / Fantasy-Impromptu in C-sharp minor, Op. 66 / Etude in A-flat major, Op. 25, No. 1 / Nocturne in B major, Op. 62, No. 1; Liszt: Weinen, Klagen, Sorgen, Zagen, prelude (after J. S. Bach); Wagner-Liszt: Isolde's Liebestod	October & November, 1989	Sony Classical
1990	Horowitz Plays Chopin, Vol. 1: Polonaise-Fantasie, Op. 61 / Ballade in G minor, Op. 23 / Barcarolle, Op. 60 / Etude in C-sharp minor, Op. 25, No. 7 / Etude in G-flat major, Op. 10, No. 5 / Ballade in F minor, Op. 52 / Waltz in A-flat major, Op. 69, No. 1 / Andante Spianato and Grande Polonaise in E-flat major, Op. 22	1945–1982	RCA Gold Seal
1990	Mussorgsky: Pictures at an Exhibition and Tchaikovsky: Concerto No. 1: Tchaikovsky: Piano Concerto in B-flat minor, Op. 23 (NBC Symphony Orchestra / Arturo Toscanini, Conductor); Mussorgsky: Pictures at an Exhibition (arr. Horowitz)	1941, 1951	RCA Gold Seal
1991	Horowitz The Poet: Schubert: Sonata in B-flat major, D. 960; Schumann: Kinderszenen, Op. 15	1986, 1987	Deutsche Grammophon
1991	Brahms: Piano Concerto No. 2: Brahms: Piano Concerto No. 2 in B-flat major, Op. 83 (NBC Symphony Orchestra / Arturo Toscanini, Conductor) / Intermezzo in B-flat minor, Op. 117 No. 2; Schubert: Impromptu, D.899, No. 3; Liszt: Au bord d'une source / Sonetto del Petrarca No. 104 / Hungarian Rhapsody No. 2 in C-sharp minor, S. 244 (arr. Horowitz)	1940–1953	RCA Gold Seal
1991	Horowitz Plays Chopin, Vol. 2: Sonata in B-flat minor, Op. 35 / Nocturne in E-flat major, Op. 9, No. 2 / Nocturne in F minor, Op. 55, No. 1 / Impromptu in A-flat major, Op. 29 / Etude in E major, Op. 10, No. 3 / Etude in C-sharp minor, Op. 10, No. 4 / Ballade in G minor, Op. 23 / Mazurka in C-sharp minor, Op. 30, No. 4 / Scherzo in B minor, Op. 20	1947–1957	RCA Gold Seal
1991	Schubert: Sonata in B-flat and Mozart: Sonata in F: Schubert: Sonata in B-flat major, D. 960; Mozart: Sonata in F major, K. 332; Czerny: Variations on a Theme by Rode, "La Ricordanza", Op. 33; Mendelssohn: Variations serieuses, Op. 54	1946–1953	RCA Gold Seal
1992	Mussorgsky: Pictures at an Exhibition: Mussorgsky: Pictures at an Exhibition (arr. Horowitz); Scriabin: Etude in C-sharp minor, Op. 2, No. 1 / Prelude in D major, Op. 11, No. 5 / Prelude in G-sharp minor, Op. 22, No. 1 / Sonata No. 9, Op. 68; Horowitz: Moment Exotique (Danse Excentrique) / Carmen Variations; Tchaikovsky: Dumka, for piano in C minor, Op. 59; Prokofiev: Precipitato from Piano Sonata No. 7, Op. 83; Rachmaninoff: Morceaux de salon, Op. 10|Morceaux de salon, Op. 10, No. 3, Barcarolle; No. 5, Humoresque; Debussy: Serenade for the doll, from Children's Corner suite, L. 113; Sousa: Stars and Stripes Forever (arr. Horowitz)	1928–1979	RCA Gold Seal
1992	Schumann: Kinderszenen, Brahms, Chopin, Debussy: Schumann: Kinderszenen, Op. 15 / Variations on a Theme by Clara Wieck; Liszt: Valse oubliée No. 1, S. 215 / Hungarian Rhapsody No. 6 in D-flat major, S. 244 / Paganini étude No. 2 in E-flat major; Debussy: Serenade for the doll; Fauré: Impromptu in F-sharp minor, Op. 102; Mendelssohn: Song without Words in G major, “May Breezes” Op. 62, No. 1; Brahms: Waltz in A-flat major, Op. 39, No. 15; Chopin: Barcarole, Op. 60 / Nocturne in F-sharp major, Op. 15, No. 2 / Mazurka in B-flat minor, Op. 24, No. 4, / Mazurka in C-sharp minor, Op. 30, No. 4 / Scherzo in C-sharp minor, Op. 39	1928–1977	RCA Gold Seal
1992	Discovered Treasures: Scarlatti: Sonata in G major, K. 547 / Sonata in B minor, K. 197 / Sonata in F-sharp minor, K. 25 / Sonata in D minor, K. 5 / Sonata in G major, K. 201 / Sonata in C minor, K. 303; Bach-Busoni: Chorale Prelude "Ich ruf zu dir, Herr Jesu Christ" BWV 639; Clementi: Rondo from Sonata in E-flat major, Op. 12, No. 2 / Adagio Sostenuto in F major, Op. 44 Book 1, No. 14, from Gradus ad Parnassum / Rondo from Sonata in B-flat major, Op. 25, No. 3 / Adagio from Sonata in A major, Op. 50, No. 1; Chopin: Etude in A-flat major, from Trois nouvelles études / Etude No. 6 in E-flat minor, Op. 10, No. 6 / Prelude in D-flat major, Op. 28, No. 15; Medtner: Fairy Tale in A major, Op. 51 No 3; Scriabin: Feuillet d'album, Op. 58 / Etude, Op. 65, No. 3; Liszt: Consolation in E major, S. 172, No. 2	1963–1972	Sony Classical
1993	Rachmaninoff: Concerto No. 3 New York Philharmonic / Eugene Ormandy, Conductor	January 1978	RCA Red Seal
1993	Horowitz Plays Chopin, Vol. 3: Scherzos: No. 1 in B minor, Op. 20 / No. 2 in B-flat minor, Op. 31; Mazurkas: Op. 59, No. 3 / Op. 41, No. 1 / Op. 50, No. 3 / Op. 63, No. 2 / Op. 63, No. 3, Op. 7, No. 3; Nocturnes: Op. 9, No. 3 / Op. 15, No. 1 / Op. 72, No. 1; Ballade in F minor, Op. 52; Waltz in A minor, Op. 34, No. 2; Polonaise-Fantasie, Op. 61	1945–1957	RCA Gold Seal
1993	Horowitz Plays Beethoven, Scarlatti, Chopin: Scarlatti: Sonatas, K. 531; K. 87; K. 380; K. 455; K. 322; K. 46 / Capriccio, K. 20 (arr. Tausig); Beethoven: Sonata in D major, Op. 10, No. 3; Chopin: Mazurka in D-flat major, Op. 30, No. 3 / Nocturne in D-flat major, Op. 27, No. 2 / Nocturne in E Minor, Op. 72 / Waltz in A Minor, Op. 42, No. 2 / Waltz in C-sharp Minor, Op. 64, No. 2 / Ballade in A-flat major, Op. 47; Dohnányi: Concert Etude (Capriccio) in F minor, Op. 28, No. 6	1928–1959	RCA Gold Seal
1993	The Complete Masterworks Recordings, Vol. 1: The Studio Recordings 1962–1963: Beethoven: Piano Sonata No. 8 in C minor, Op. 13 "Pathetique"; Chopin: Sonata in B-flat Minor, Op. 35 / Scherzo, Op. 20 / Etude in C minor, Op. 10 No. 12 / Etude in C sharp minor, Op. 25 No. 7; Schumann: Arabeske, Op. 18 / Toccata, Op. 7 / Kinderszenen, Op. 15; Rachmaninoff, Liszt, Scarlatti, Schubert, Scriabin, Debussy	1962–1963	Sony Classical
1993	The Complete Masterworks Recordings, Vol. 2: The Celebrated Scarlatti Recordings: 18 Sonatas: K. 33, K. 54, K. 525, K. 466, K. 146, K. 96, K. 162, K. 474, K. 198, K. 491, K. 481, K. 39, K. 547, K. 197, K. 25, K. 52, K. 201, K. 303	1964	Sony Classical
1993	The Complete Masterworks Recordings, Vol. 3: The Historic Return: Bach-Busoni: Toccata in C major; Schumann: Fantasy in C major, Op. 17 / Blumenstuck, Op 19 / Träumerei; Scriabin: Sonatas Nos. 9 & 10 / Poeme, Op. 32 / Etude, Op. 2, No. 1; Chopin: Ballade in G minor, Op. 23 / Mazurka in C sharp minor, Op. 30 No. 4 / Mazurka in B minor, Op. 33, No. 4 / Etude in F major, Op. 10 No. 8 / Nocturne in E minor, Op. 72, No. 1; Haydn: Sonata in F major, Hob. XVI:23; Mozart: Sonata in A major, K. 331; Debussy: L'isle joyeuse; Liszt: Vallée d'Obermann	1965–1966	Sony Classical
1993	The Complete Masterworks Recordings, Vol. 4: The Legendary 1968 TV Concert: Chopin: Ballade in G minor, Op. 23 / Nocturne in F minor, Op. 55, No. 1 / Polonaise in F-sharp minor, Op. 44; Scarlatti: Sonata in E major, K. 380 / Sonata in G major, K. 55; Schumann: Arabeske, Op. 18 / Träumerei; Scriabin: Etude in D-sharp minor, Op. 8, No. 12; Horowitz: Variations on a Theme from Bizet's Carmen	1968	Sony Classical
1993	The Complete Masterworks Recordings, Vol. 5: A Baroque & Classical Recital: Clementi: Rondo: Allegro assai from Piano Sonata in B-flat major, Op. 12, No. 1 / Adagio sostenuto from Gradus ad Parnassum, Op. 44, No. 14 / Rondo: Vivace from Piano Sonata in B-flat major, Op. 25, No. 3 / Adagio sostenuto e patetico from Piano Sonata in A major, Op. 50, No. 1; Bach-Busoni: Chorale Prelude Ich ruf zu dir, Herr Jesu Christ; Scarlatti: Sonata in F-sharp major, K. 319 / Sonata in G major, K. 260; Haydn: Sonata No. 48 in C major; Beethoven: Sonata in A major, Op. 101	1963–1972	Sony Classical
1993	The Complete Masterworks Recordings, Vol. 6: Beethoven: Sonata in C-sharp minor, Op. 27, No. 2 Moonlight; Sonata in C major, Op. 53 Waldstein; Sonata in F minor, Op. 57 Appassionata	1972–1973	Sony Classical
1993	The Complete Masterworks Recordings, Vol. 7: Early Romantics: Chopin: Seven Mazurkas / Etude in G-flat major, Op. 10, No. 5 / Etude in C-sharp minor, Op. 10, No. 4 / Etude in E major, Op. 10, No. 3 / Etude in C minor, Op. 10, No. 12 / Etude in E-flat minor, Op. 10, No. 6 / Etude No. 2 in A-Flat major from Trois nouvelles études / Introduction and Rondo in E-flat major, Op. 16 / Waltz in A minor, Op. 34 No.2 / Waltz in C-sharp minor, Op. 64 No. 2 / Prelude in B minor, Op. 28 No. 6 / Prelude in D-flat major, Op. 28 No. 15 / Polonaise in A-flat major, Op. 53 / Polonaise in A major, Op. 40, No. 1; Schumann: Variations on a Theme of Clara Weick / Kreisleriana, Op. 16	1968–1971	Sony Classical
1993	The Complete Masterworks Recordings, Vol. 8: The Romantic & Impressionist Era: Schubert: Impromptu in A-flat major, Op. 90 No. 4 / Impromptu in F minor, Op. 142 No. 1 / Impromptu in A-flat major, Op. 142 No. 2 / Impromptu in E-flat major, Op. 90 No. 2; Liszt: Consolation No. 2 / Scherzo and March, S. 177; Debussy: Etude Pour les arpèges composes / Prelude La terrasse des audiences du clair de lune; Mendelssohn: Etude in A minor, Op. 104b, No. 3	1962–1973	Sony Classical
1993	The Complete Masterworks Recordings, Vol. 9: Late Russian Romantics: Scriabin: Eight Etudes from Opp. 8, 42, & 65 / Two Album Leaves / Two Poemes, Op. 69 / Vers la Flamme, Op. 72; Medtner: Fairy Tale in A major, Op. 51, No. 3; Rachmaninoff: Sonata in B-flat minor, Op. 36 / Prelude in G-sharp minor, Op. 32, No. 12 / Moment Musicaux in B minor, Op. 16, No. 3 / Three Études-Tableaux from Op. 33 & 39	1967–1972	Sony Classical
1994	The Private Collection Vol. 1: Bach: Toccata in C minor, BWV. 911; Clementi: Sonata in A major, Op. 33, No. 1 / Sonata in B-flat major, Op. 24, No. 2 Allegro con brio / Sonata in C major, Op. 34, No. 1 Un poco andante, quasi allegretto; Mendelssohn: Song without Words in B-flat major, Op. 67, No. 3; Chopin: Fantasy in F minor, Op. 49 / Polonaise in C-sharp minor, Op. 26, No. 1 / Mazurka in B minor, Op. 30, No. 2; Liszt: Consolations, Nos. 4 and 5, S. 172; Rachmaninoff: Etude-Tableaux in C minor, Op. 39 No.7	1945–1950	RCA Red Seal
1995	The Private Collection Vol. 2: Debussy: Etudes, Book I: Nos. 4, 1, & 6; Prokofiev: Intermezzo and Valse lente from the ballet Cinderella; Poulenc: Intermezzo No 2 in D-flat major / Novelette No 1 in C major; Kabalevsky: Preludes, Op. 38, Nos. 1, 10, 17, 3, 16, 8, 22, 24 / Sonata No. 2 in E-flat major, Op. 45; Barber: Excursions, Op. 20, Nos. 1, 2, & 4	1945–1949	RCA Red Seal
1997	Vladimir Horowitz, Solo Recordings 1928–1936: Haydn: Sonata No. 62 in E-flat major; Beethoven: 32 Variations in C minor; Chopin: Scherzo in E major, Op. 54 / 3 Mazurkas / 4 Etudes; Liszt: Sonata in B minor / Funérailles / Paganini Etude in E-flat major / Valse Oubliee No. 1; Schumann: Toccata, Op. 7 / Traumes Wirren, Op. 12 / Arabeske, Op. 18 / Presto Passionato; Poulenc: Pastourelle / Toccata; & works by Bach–Busoni, Scarlatti, Rachmaninoff, Debussy, Horowitz, Rimsky-Korsakov, and Stravinsky	1930–1936	Pearl
1999	Beethoven Sonatas: Sonata in F minor, Op. 57 “Appassionata”; Sonata in D major, Op. 10, No. 3	1959	RCA Red Seal
2001	Chopin: Piano Music: Polonaise-Fantasie, Op. 61 / Ballade in G minor, Op, 23 / Nocturne in E-flat major, Op. 9, No. 2 / Nocturne in C-sharp minor, Op. 27, No. 1 / Barcarolle, Op. 60 / Etude in C-sharp minor, Op. 25, No. 7 / Etude in G-flat major, Op. 10, No. 5 "Black Keys" / Nocturne in B major, Op. 9, No. 3 / Nocturne in F major, Op. 15, No. 1 / Ballade in F minor, Op. 52 / Waltz in A-flat major, Op. 69, No. 1	1957–1982	RCA Red Seal
2003	The Boston Recital: Haydn: Sonata No. 48 in C major; Chopin: Ballade in F minor, Op. 52 / Mazurka in C-sharp minor, Op. 30, No. 4 / Scherzo in B minor, Op. 20; Scriabin: Etudes: Op. 2, No. 1; Op. 65, Nos. 2 & 3, Op. 42, Nos. 4 & 3, Op. 8, Nos. 11 & 10; Liszt: Hungarian Rhapsody No. 13 in A minor, S. 244 (arr. Horowitz); Debussy: Serenade of the doll; Schumann: Träumerei; Rachmaninoff: Etude-Tableaux in D major, Op. 39, No. 9; Also includes Guest Star radio broadcast from 1951, and press conference in Cleveland from 1974.	October 1969	Living Stage
2003	Horowitz reDiscovered: Schumann: Blumenstück, Op. 19 / Piano Sonata in F minor, Op. 14 ('Concerto Without Orchestra'); Rachmaninoff: Prelude in G major, Op. 32, No. 5 / Etude-Tableaux in E-flat minor, Op. 39, No. 5 / Etude-Tableaux in D major, Op. 39, No. 9; Liszt: Valse oubliée No. 1, S. 215, No. 1 / Au bord d'une source; Chopin: Waltz in A minor, Op. 34, No. 2 / Scherzo in B minor, Op. 20; Debussy: Serenade of the Doll; Schumann: Träumerei; Moszkowski: Étincelles, Op. 36, No. 6; Japanese edition only: Chopin Mazurka in A minor, Op. 17, No. 4 from November 23, 1975, recital	November 16, 1975	RCA Red Seal
2003	Horowitz Live and Unedited – The Historic 1965 Carnegie Hall Return Concert: Bach-Busoni: Toccata in C major, BWV. 564; Schumann: Fantasy in C major, Op. 17 / Träumerei; Scriabin: Sonata No. 9, Op. 68 / Poème for piano in F-sharp major, Op. 32, No. 1; Chopin: Mazurka in C-sharp minor, Op. 30, No. 4 / Etude in F major, Op. 10, No. 8 / Ballade in G minor, Op. 23; Debussy: Serenade for the Doll; Scriabin: Etude in C-sharp minor, Op. 2, No. 1; Moszkowski: Etude in A-flat major, Op. 72, No. 11; Schumann: Kinderszenen, Op. 15 (Studio recording, 1962); DVD: Outtakes from The Last Romantic	1962–1965	Sony Masterworks
2008	Horowitz in Hamburg – The Last Concert: Mozart: Rondo in D major, K. 485 / Sonata in B-flat major, K. 333; Liszt: Soirées de Vienne, Valse Caprice No. 6 (after Schubert); Schumann: Kinderszenen, Op. 15; Chopin: Mazurka in B minor, Op. 33, No. 4 / Polonaise in A-flat major, Op. 53; Schubert: Moment Musical in F minor, D. 780, No. 3; Moszkowski: Étincelles, Op. 36, No. 6	July 21, 1987	Deutsche Grammophon
2009	Vladimir Horowitz At Carnegie Hall – The Private Collection: Mussorgsky & Liszt: Mussorgsky: Pictures at an Exhibition (Arr. Horowitz); Liszt: Sonata in B minor	1948, 1949	Sony Classical
2009	Vladimir Horowitz At Carnegie Hall – The Private Collection: Schumann, Chopin, Liszt & Balakirev: Schumann: Fantasy in C major, Op. 17; Balakirev: Islamey – Oriental Fantasy; Chopin: Barcarolle, Op. 60; Liszt: Legende – St Francois de Paule Marchant Sur Les Flots, S. 175, No. 2	1946–1950	Sony Classical
2009	The Welte Mignon Mystery Vol. XI – Vladimir Horowitz today playing all his 1926 interpretations.: Horowitz: Moment exotique; Chopin: Barcarole, Op. 60 / Mazurka No. 21 Op. 30, No. 4 in C-sharp minor / Mazurka No. 40 Op. 63, No. 2 in F minor / Mazurka No. 41 Op. 63, No. 3 in C-sharp minor / Étude Op. 10, No. 8 in F major / Étude Op. 10, No. 5 in G-flat major; Bizet-Horowitz: Variations on a Theme from Carmen; Schubert–Liszt: Liebesbotschaft (Love's Message), Transcription fr. Schuberts "Schwanengesang" D 957, 1; Liszt: Valse oubliée No. 1 from "Trois Valses oubliées"; Rachmaninoff: Prelude in G minor, Op. 23, No. 5 / Prelude in G-sharp minor, Op. 32, No. 12; Bach–Busoni: Prelude and Fugue in D major / Toccata in C major; Liszt–Busoni: Fantasy on Themes from Mozart's Marriage of Figaro and Don Giovanni	1926/2009	Tacet
2010	Vladimir Horowitz At Carnegie Hall – The Private Collection: Haydn & Beethoven: Haydn: Sonata No. 62 in E-flat major; Beethoven: Sonata in C major, Op. 53 "Waldstein" / Sonata in C-sharp minor, Op. 27, No. 2 "Moonlight"	1945–1948	Sony Classical
2010	Horowitz – The Legendary Berlin Concert: Scarlatti: Sonata in B minor, K. 87 / Sonata in E major, K. 380 / Sonata in E major, K. 135; Schumann: Kreisleriana, Op.16; Scriabin: Etude in C-sharp minor, Op. 2 No. 1 / Etude in D-sharp minor, Op. 8 No. 12; Rachmaninoff: Prelude in G major, Op. 32 No. 5 / Prelude in G-sharp minor, Op. 32, No. 12; Liszt: Sonetto 104 del Petrarca / Soirée de Vienne No. 6 (after Schubert) / Valse Oubliée No. 1; Chopin: Mazurka in A minor, Op. 17 No. 4 / Mazurka in F minor, Op. 7 No. 3 / Polonaise in A-flat major, Op. 53; Schumann: Träumerei, Op. 15 No. 7; Moszkowski: Étincelles, Op. 36, No. 6	May 18, 1986	Sony Classical

== Compilations ==
Year of issue	Album details	Recording year(s)	Record label
1990	Portrait Of Vladimir Horowitz: Scarlatti: Sonata in E major, K. 531 (L. 430) / Sonata in A major, K. 322 (L. 483); Mozart: Piano Sonata No. 11 in A major, K. 331; Beethoven: Piano Sonata No. 14 in C-sharp minor "Moonlight", Op. 27 No. 2; Chopin: Piano Sonata No. 2 in B-flat minor, Op. 35; Moszkowski: Etude in A-flat major, Op. 72, No. 11; Scriabin: Etude in D-sharp minor, Op. 8, No. 12; Schumann: Träumerei; Horowitz: Variations on a Theme from Bizet's "Carmen"	1962–1972	CBS Masterworks
1990	Horowitz – Encores: Horowitz: Carmen Variations; Saint-Saëns/Liszt/Horowitz: Danse macabre; Mozart: Rondo alla turca; Mendelssohn: Wedding March and Variations (arr. Liszt/Horowitz) / Songs Without Words: Elegie, Op. 85, No. 4, Spring Song, Op. 62, No. 2, The Shepherd's Complaint, Op. 67, No. 5 / Scherzo a capriccio; Claude Debussy: Serenade of the Doll; Moszkowski: Etudes, Op. 72: A-flat major, No. 11, F major, No. 2 / Étincelles, Op. 36, No. 6; Chopin: Polonaise in A-flat major, Op. 53; Schumann: Träumerei; Liszt: Rakóczy March (arr. Horowitz) / Valse oubliée No. 1; Rachmaninoff: Prelude in G minor, Op. 23, No. 5; Sousa/Horowitz: Stars and Stripes Forever	1943–1981	RCA Gold Seal
1998	Great Pianists of the 20th Century – Vladimir Horowitz I: Schumann: Toccata in C major, Op. 7 / Arabeske in C major, Op. 18 / Fantasiestücke, Op. 12 – Traumes Wirren / Presto Appassionato in G minor / Kreisleriana, Op. 16 / Humoreske, Op. 20 / Sonata in F minor, Op. 14 (Concerto without Orchestra) / Novellette in F major, Op. 21, No. 1 / Phantasiestücke, Op. 111 / Kinderszenen, Op. 15	1932–1987	Philips
1999	Great Pianists of the 20th Century – Vladimir Horowitz II: Liszt: Hungarian Rhapsody No. 6 / Valse oubliée No. 1 / Paganini Étude No. 2 / Au bord d'une source / Sonetto del Petrarca No. 104 / Soirées de Vienne, Valse Caprice No. 6 / Piano Sonata in B minor, S.178 / Ballade No. 2 in B minor / Hungarian Rhapsody No. 2 (arr. Horowitz); Rachmaninoff: Piano Sonata No. 2 in B-flat minor, Op. 36; Prokofiev: Piano Sonata No. 7 in B-flat major, Op. 83; Scriabin: Piano Sonata No. 5 in F-sharp major, Op. 53; Chopin: Fantaisie in F minor, Op. 49 / Polonaise-Fantaisie in A-flat major, Op. 61	1930–1989	Philips
1999	Great Pianists of the 20th Century – Vladimir Horowitz III: Chopin: Barcarole in F sharp major, Op. 60 / Mazurka in C-sharp minor, Op. 30, No. 4 / Mazurka in F minor, Op. 7, No. 3 / Mazurka in E minor, Op. 41, No. 2 / Mazurka in C-sharp minor, Op. 50, No. 3 / Étude in C-sharp minor, Op. 10, No. 4 / Étude in G-flat major, Op. 10, No. 5 / Étude in F major, Op. 10, No. 8 / Étude in F major, Op. 25, No. 3 / Étude in E major, Op. 10, No. 3 / Étude in C-sharp minor, Op. 25, No. 7 / Mazurka in B-flat minor, Op. 24, No. 4 / Mazurka in B minor, Op. 30, No. 2 / Mazurka in D-flat major, Op. 30, No. 3 / Mazurka in F-sharp minor, Op. 59, No. 3 / Mazurka in C-sharp minor, Op. 41, No. 1 / Mazurka in C sharp minor, Op. 63, No. 3 / Mazurka in F minor, Op. 63, No. 2 / Polonaise in A flat major, Op. 53; Beethoven: Piano Concerto No. 5 in E-flat major, Op. 73; Rachmaninoff: Piano Concerto No. 3 in D minor, Op. 30	1928–1980	Philips
1999	Vladimir Horowitz – The Indispensable: Chopin: Polonaise-Fantaisie, Op. 61 / Scherzo No. 1, Op. 20 / Étude, Op. 10, No. 4 / Nocturne, Op. 9, No. 3 / Nocturne, Op. 27, No. 1 / Scherzo No. 2, Op. 31 / Barcarolle, Op. 60 / Nocturne, Op. 72, No. 1 / Polonaise, Op. 53 / Étude, Op. 25, No. 7 / Ballade No. 1, Op. 23; Scarlatti: Sonata, L. 186 / Sonata, L. 33 / Sonata, L. 224; Rachmaninoff: Humoresque, Op. 10, No. 5 / Prelude, Op. 23, No. 5 / Prelude, Op. 32, No. 5 / Barcarolle, Op. 10, No. 3; Moszkowski: Étincelles, Op. 36, No. 6 / Etude, Op. 72, No. 6; Liszt/Horowitz: Hungarian Rhapsody No. 2 / Mephisto Waltz No. 1 / Rakóczy March; Horowitz: Variations on a Theme from "Carmen"; Scriabin: Etude, Op. 2, No. 1 / Etude, Op. 8, No. 7 / Etude, Op. 8, No. 12 / Etude, Op. 42 No. 5; Sousa/Horowitz: Stars and Stripes Forever	1945–1982	RCA Red Seal
2001	Vladimir Horowitz – A Reminiscence: Schubert: Impromptu in G-flat major, D. 899, No. 3; Chopin: Waltz in C-sharp minor, Op. 64, No. 2 / Prelude in B minor, Op. 28, No. 6 / Prelude in D-flat major, Op. 28, No. 15 / Mazurka in E minor, Op. 41, No. 2; Scarlatti: Sonata in D major, K. 491 (L. 164); Bach-Busoni: Chorale Prelude "Ich ruf zu dir, Herr Jesu Christ" BWV 639; Rachmaninoff: Prelude in G-sharp minor, Op. 32, No. 12 / Moment musical in B minor, Op. 16, No. 3; Beethoven: Piano Sonata No. 14 in C-sharp minor "Moonlight", Op. 27, No. 2 – I. Adagio sostenuto; Liszt: Consolation No. 2 in E major; Scriabin: Feuillet d'album in E-flat major, Op. 45, No. 1 / Etude in A-flat major, Op. 8, No. 8 / Feuillet d'album, Op. 58; Debussy: Préludes, Book II: VII. La terrasse des audiences du clair de lune / V. Bruyères; Schumann: Kinderszenen, Op. 15: Von fremden Ländern und Menschen / Träumerei	1962–1973	Sony Classical
2003	The Magic of Horowitz (Contains 2 CDs + 1 DVD – includes three previously unreleased recordings.): Liszt: Soirées de Vienne, Valse Caprice No. 6 / Ständchen, S. 560 / Valse oubliée No. 1 / Sonetto del Petrarca No. 104 / Weihnachtsbaum, S. 186, No. 10; Chopin: Mazurka in A minor, Op. 17, No. 4 / Mazurka in C-sharp minor, Op. 30 No. 4; Scriabin: Etude, Op. 8, No. 12 / Etude, Op. 2, No. 1; Schubert: Impromptu in B-flat major, D. 935, No. 3 / Moment musical in F minor, D. 80, No. 3; Schubert-Tausig: Marche Militaire in D-flat major; Scarlatti: Sonata in E major, K. 135 (L. 224); Bach–Busoni: Chorale Prelude "Nun komm' der Heiden Heiland"; Rachmaninoff: Prelude in G major, Op. 32, No. 5 / Prelude in G-sharp minor, Op. 32, No. 12 / Polka de W. R.; Schumann: Träumerei / Kreisleriana, Op. 16; Mozart: Piano Concerto No. 23 in A major, K. 488 (La Scala Philharmonic / Carlo Maria Giulini, Conductor) / Rondo No. 3 in A minor, K. 511	1985–1989	Deutsche Grammophon
2003	Legendary RCA Recordings: Tchaikovsky: Piano Concerto No. 1 in B flat minor, Op. 23 (NBC Symphony Orchestra / Arturo Toscanini, Conductor); Rachmaninoff: Piano Concerto No. 3 in D minor, Op. 30 / Prelude in G major, Op. 32 No. 5; Frédéric Chopin: Polonaise-fantasy, Op. 61 / Mazurka in C sharp minor, Op. 30 No. 4 / Nocturne in E flat major, Op. 9 No. 2; Schumann: Träumerei / Piano Sonata No. 3 in F minor "Concerto Without Orchestra", Op. 14; Scriabin: Prelude Op. 48 No. 3 / Op. 11 No. 13 / Op. 15 No. 2 / Etude in D sharp minor, Op. 8 No. 12; Moszkowski: Étincelles, Op 36 No. 6; Horowitz: Variations on a Theme from Bizet's "Carmen"; Prokofiev: Toccata, Op. 11; Clementi: Capriccio in C major, Op. 47 No. 2; Poulenc: Presto in B flat major, FP 70; Scarlatti: Sonata in F minor, K. 184 (L. 189) / Sonata in A major, K. 101 (L. 494); Liszt: Mephisto Waltz No. 1	1941–1982	RCA Records
2009	Vladimir Horowitz – Greatest Hits: Sousa: The Stars and Stripes Forever (arr. Horowitz); Moszkowski: Étincelles, Op. 36, No. 6; Mendelssohn: Song Without Words, Op. 62, No. 6; Horowitz: Variations on a Theme from Bizet's "Carmen"; Rachmaninoff: Morceaux de salon, Op. 10, No. 3; Chopin: Polonaise in A-flat major, Op. 53 / Ballade No. 1 in G minor, Op. 23 / Nocturne in E minor, Op. 72 No. 1; Liszt: Hungarian Rhapsody No. 2 in C-sharp minor, S. 244 / Valse oubliée No. 1; Beethoven: Piano Sonata No. 14 in C-sharp minor, Op. 27 No. 2 "Moonlight" – 1. Adagio sostenuto; Schumann: Von fremden Ländern und Menschen / Träumerei; Debussy: Serenade of the doll; Mozart: Rondo alla Turca	1946–1953	Sony Masterworks
2009	The Essential Vladimir Horowitz: Chopin: Polonaise in A-Flat, Op. 53 / Ballade No. 1 in G minor, Op. 23 / Mazurka in B minor, Op. 33, No. 4 / Prélude In D-flat major, Op. 28, No. 15 "Raindrop" / Nocturne, Op. 72, No. 1 / Étude in G-flat major, Op. 10, No. 5; Schumann: Träumerei / Von fremden Ländern und Menschen / Arabeske in C major, Op. 18; Mozart: Rondo Alla Turca; Debussy: Serenade Of The Doll; Liszt: Rakóczy March / Valse Oubliée No. 1 / Consolation No. 3 / Consolation No. 2; Horowitz: Carmen Variations; Mendelssohn: Spring Song, Op. 62, No. 6 / Scherzo a Capriccio; Saint-Saëns/Liszt/Horowitz: Danse macabre; Moszkowski: Étincelles, Op. 36, No. 6 / Etude In A-Flat, Op. 72, No. 11; Rachmaninoff: Prelude in G minor, Op. 23, No. 5; Clementi: Sonata, Op. 36, No. 1, In A; Sousa/Horowitz: Stars and Stripes Forever; Beethoven: Piano Sonata No. 8 in C minor, Op. 13 – II. Adagio cantabile / Piano Sonata No. 14 in C-sharp minor, Op. 27, No. 2 "Moonlight" – I. Adagio Sostenuto; Scarlatti: Sonata in D major, K. 491 (L. 164) / Sonata in G major, K 146 (L 349); Scriabin: Étude in C-sharp minor, Op. 2, No. 1 / Étude in D-Sharp minor, Op. 8, No. 12; Wagner/Liszt: Isolde's Liebestod	1942–1989	Sony Masterworks

== Boxed sets ==
Year of issue	Album details	Recording year(s)	Record label
1990	Recordings 1930–1951: 3 CDs; Contains the His Master's Voice recordings.	1930–1951	EMI
1993	The Complete Masterworks Recordings, 1962–1973: 13 CDs, 9 Volumes	1962–1973	Sony Classical
2001	The Original Jacket Collection: 10 CDs; Contains Horowitz's Columbia recordings.	1962–1972	Sony Classical
2003	Complete Recordings on Deutsche Grammophon: 6 CDs	1985–1989	Deutsche Grammophon
2009	The Complete Original Jacket Collection: 70 CDs; Contains Horowitz's complete RCA, Columbia, and Sony recordings issued through 2008, also includes two previously unreleased recitals (Carnegie Hall March 5, 1951, and Whitman Auditorium November 12, 1967).	1928–1989	Sony Classical
2010	Complete Recordings on Deutsche Grammophon: 7 CDs	1985–1989	Deutsche Grammophon
2013	Live at Carnegie Hall: 41 CDs + 1 DVD; Contains RCA's and Columbia's complete recordings of Horowitz's Carnegie Hall appearances, from 1943 to 1978, along with three complete recitals from Horowitz's private recordings, and excerpts from previously released "Private Collection" recordings. Also includes DVD of 1968 recital for CBS-TV.	1943–1978	Sony Classical
2015	The Unreleased Live Recordings: 50 CDs; Contains the RCA's and Columbia's complete recordings of Horowitz's non-Carnegie Hall appearances (with the exception of two 1983 Tokyo recitals, which were withheld).; Produced by Robert Russ and nominated for Best Historical Album at the 59th Annual Grammy Awards.	1966–1983	Sony Classical
2019	The Great Comeback—Horowitz at Carnegie Hall: 15 CDs; Rehearsal January 7, 1965, Carnegie Hall*, Rehearsal January 13, 1965, Carnegie Hall*, Recording Session, January 26, 1965, Columbia 30th Street Studio*, Rehearsal April 7, 1965, Carnegie Hall*, Rehearsal April 14, 1965, Carnegie Hall*, Recital May 9, 1965, Carnegie Hall “An Historic Return”**, Rehearsal, November 9, 1965, Carnegie Hall “Blackout Concert”* & Recording Session, May 18, 1966, Columbia 30th Street Studio*, Rehearsal April 5, 1966: Carnegie Hall*, Recital April 17, 1966: Carnegie Hall**, Interview with Abram Chasins, June 1965* (* previously unreleased / ** remastered); Produced by Robert Russ and nominated for Best Historical Album at the 62nd Annual Grammy Awards.	1965–1966	Sony Classical

== Video releases ==
Horowitz's first appearance on television was a one-hour recital for the CBS television network in 1968. He also performed at the White House in 1978, celebrating the 50th anniversary of his American debut with an all-Chopin recital from the East Room. Although never officially released on home video, copies of the recital are available from the Jimmy Carter Library.

Horowitz's debut in Japan, in 1983, was broadcast on Japanese public television. Horowitz was under the influence of anti-depressant medication, which severely impaired his playing and led to a withdrawal from performance until 1985. Although clips of the recital have appeared on the internet, no material from this time period has been seen on any documentaries.

In addition, Horowitz can be seen in various news shows, including a 1977 60 Minutes story.

Year of issue	Details	Recording date(s)	Label
2013	Vladimir Horowitz – A Television Concert at Carnegie Hall: Chopin: Ballade in G minor, Op. 23 / Nocturne in F minor, Op. 55, No. 1 / Polonaise in F-sharp minor, Op. 44; Scarlatti: Sonata in E major, K. 380 / Sonata in G major, K. 55; Robert Schumann: Arabeske, Op. 18 / Träumerei; Scriabin: Etude in D-sharp minor, Op. 8, No. 10; Horowitz: Variations on a theme from Bizet's Carmen	January 2, February 1, 1968	Sony
1982	Horowitz in London: Traditional: God Save the Queen; Scarlatti: Six sonatas; Chopin: Polonaise-Fantasie, Op. 61 / Ballade in G minor, Op. 23 / Waltz in A-flat major, Op. 69 No. 1; Schumann: Kinderszenen, Op. 15; Rachmaninoff: Sonata in B-flat minor, Op. 36 / Polka de W. R.; Scriabin: Etude in D-sharp minor, Op. 8, No. 12	May 22, 1982	Sony
1986	Vladimir Horowitz – The Last Romantic: Bach–Busoni: Chorale Prelude "Nun komm' der Heiden Heiland"; Mozart: Sonata in C major, K. 330; Chopin: Mazurka in A minor, Op. 17, No. 4 / Scherzo in B minor, Op. 20 / Polonaise in A-flat major, Op. 53; Schubert: Impromptu in A-flat major, D. 899, No. 4; Liszt: Consolation No. 3 in D-flat major, S. 172, No. 3; Schumann: Novelette in F major, Op. 21, No. 1; Scriabin: Etude in C-sharp minor, Op. 2, No. 1; Rachmaninoff: Prelude in G-sharp minor, Op. 32, No. 12; Moszkowski: Etude in F major, Op. 72, No. 6	April 1985	Pioneer
1986	Horowitz in Moscow: Scarlatti: Sonata in E major, K. 380; Mozart: Sonata in C major, K. 330; Rachmaninoff: Prelude in G major, Op. 32, No. 5 / Prelude in G-sharp minor, Op. 32, No. 12; Scriabin: Etude in C-sharp minor, Op. 2, No. 1 / Etude in D-sharp minor, Op. 8, No. 12; Liszt: Soirées de Vienne, Valse Caprice No. 6 (after Schubert) / Sonetto del Petrarca No. 104; Chopin: Mazurka in C-sharp minor, Op. 30, No. 4 / Mazurka in F minor, Op. 7, No. 3; Schumann: Träumerei; Moszkowski: Étincelles, Op. 36, No. 6; Rachmaninoff: Polka de W. R. (not included in the Pioneer version)	April 20, 1986	Pioneer / Sony
1988	Horowitz Plays Mozart: Piano Concerto No. 23 in A major, K. 488 (La Scala Philharmonic / Carlo Maria Giulini, Conductor)	March 1987	Deutsche Grammophon
1991	Horowitz in Vienna: Mozart: Rondo in D major, K. 485 / Sonata in B-flat major, K. 333; Schubert: Impromptu in G-flat major, D. 899, No. 3 / Moment Musical in F minor, D. 780, No. 3; Liszt: Soirees de Vienne, Valse caprice No. 6 (after Schubert) / Consolation No. 3; Schumann: Kinderszenen, Op. 15; Chopin: Mazurka in B minor, Op. 33, No. 4 / Polonaise in A-flat major, Op. 53; Moszkowski: Étincelles, Op. 36, No. 6	May 31, 1987	Deutsche Grammophon
1993	Vladimir Horowitz – A Reminiscence: Documentary containing interviews with Wanda Toscanini Horowitz and various clips of Horowitz performing.	N/A	Sony Classical / Kultur
1995	Rachmaninoff: Piano Concerto No. 3: New York Philharmonic / Zubin Mehta, Conductor	September 24, 1978	Deutsche Grammophon
