= The Last Romantic =

- Horowitz during the film
- Also known as: Vladimir Horowitz: The Last Romantic
- Genre: Biography; Documentary; Music
- Directed by: David Maysles; Albert Maysles
- Starring: Vladimir Horowitz; Wanda Toscanini Horowitz
- Country of origin: United States
- Original language: English

Production
- Executive producer: Susan Frömke
- Producer: Peter Gelb
- Production location: New York City
- Cinematography: Albert Maysles
- Editors: Deborah Dickson, Patricia Jaffe
- Running time: 89 minutes
- Production company: Geneon (Pioneer)

Original release
- Network: PBS
- Release: November 15, 1985

The Last Romantic is a 1985 documentary filmed within the home of concert pianist Vladimir Horowitz. The film contains mainly performances of classical works, but also provides an intimate look into Horowitz's private life.

== Description ==
The Last Romantic is a documentary filmed at Vladimir Horowitz's townhouse on the Upper East Side of New York. It features many performances of some of the pieces of Horowitz's favorite repertoire and sheds light on his thoughts and opinions on music.

During the film Horowitz often jokes and talks about his favorite composers: his friend Sergei Rachmaninoff, Frédéric Chopin, and Alexander Scriabin. Horowitz's wife, Wanda, also contributes her share to the discussions; she shows photo albums and reminisces about their past.

== Performances ==
These are the pieces performed in the film (In order of performance):

1. Chorale Prelude BWV659 Nun komm, der Heiden Heiland (Bach arr. Busoni)
2. Piano Sonata No. 10 in C major, K330 (Mozart)
3. Impromptu in A♭ major, D899 No. 4 (Schubert)
4. Mazurka No. 13 in A minor, Op. 17 No. 4 (Chopin)
5. Scherzo No. 1 in B minor, Op. 20 (Chopin)
6. Consolation, S. 172 No. 3 in D♭ major (Liszt)
7. Prelude Op. 32 No. 12 in G♯ minor (Rachmaninoff)
8. Novelette in F major, Op. 21 No. 1 (Schumann)
9. Étude Op. 2 No. 1 in C♯ minor (Scriabin)
10. Polonaise No. 6 in A♭ major, Op. 53 'Héroïque' (Chopin)

=== Outtakes ===
Three additional performances were released as a bonus DVD from the 2003 release Horowitz Live and Unedited.

1. Etude in G♭ major, Op. 10 No. 5 (Chopin)
2. Etude in F major, Op. 72 No. 6 (Moszkowski)
3. Au bord d'une source (Liszt)
