= Stefan Witwicki =

Polish poet

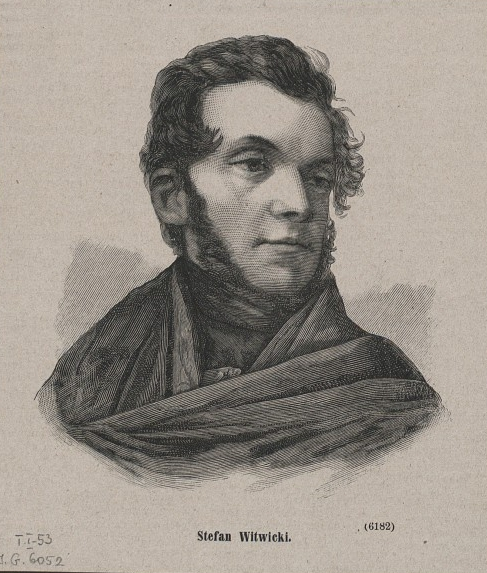
Stefan Witwicki, ca. 1831

Stefan Witwicki (September 13, 1801 – April 15, 1847) was a Polish poet of the Romantic period.

== Life ==
From 1822 Witwicki worked in the Congress Poland's Government Commission on Religions and Education (Komisja Rządowa Wyznań i Oświaty).

In 1832 he emigrated of his own free will to Paris, France, where he became a friend of the Polish poet Adam Mickiewicz.

He was a friend of Frédéric Chopin, who dedicated his Mazurkas, Op. 41 to him, and who also set ten of his texts as Polish songs.

== Works ==
Witwicki wrote:

- lyrics, including the popular Piosenki sielskie (Idyllic Songs, 1830), which have been set to music by Frédéric Chopin (see Polish songs by Frédéric Chopin), Stanisław Moniuszko and others;
- a cycle of paraphrases, Poezje biblijne (Biblical Poems, 1830);
- a dramatic poem, Edmund (1829); and
- an encomium to traditionalism, in his prose writings, Wieczory pielgrzyma (A Pilgrim's Evenings, 1837–42; enlarged edition, 1844–45).

== See also ==
- List of Poles
