= Carmen Variations (Horowitz) =

Set of variations based on Bizet's Carmen by Vladimir Horowitz

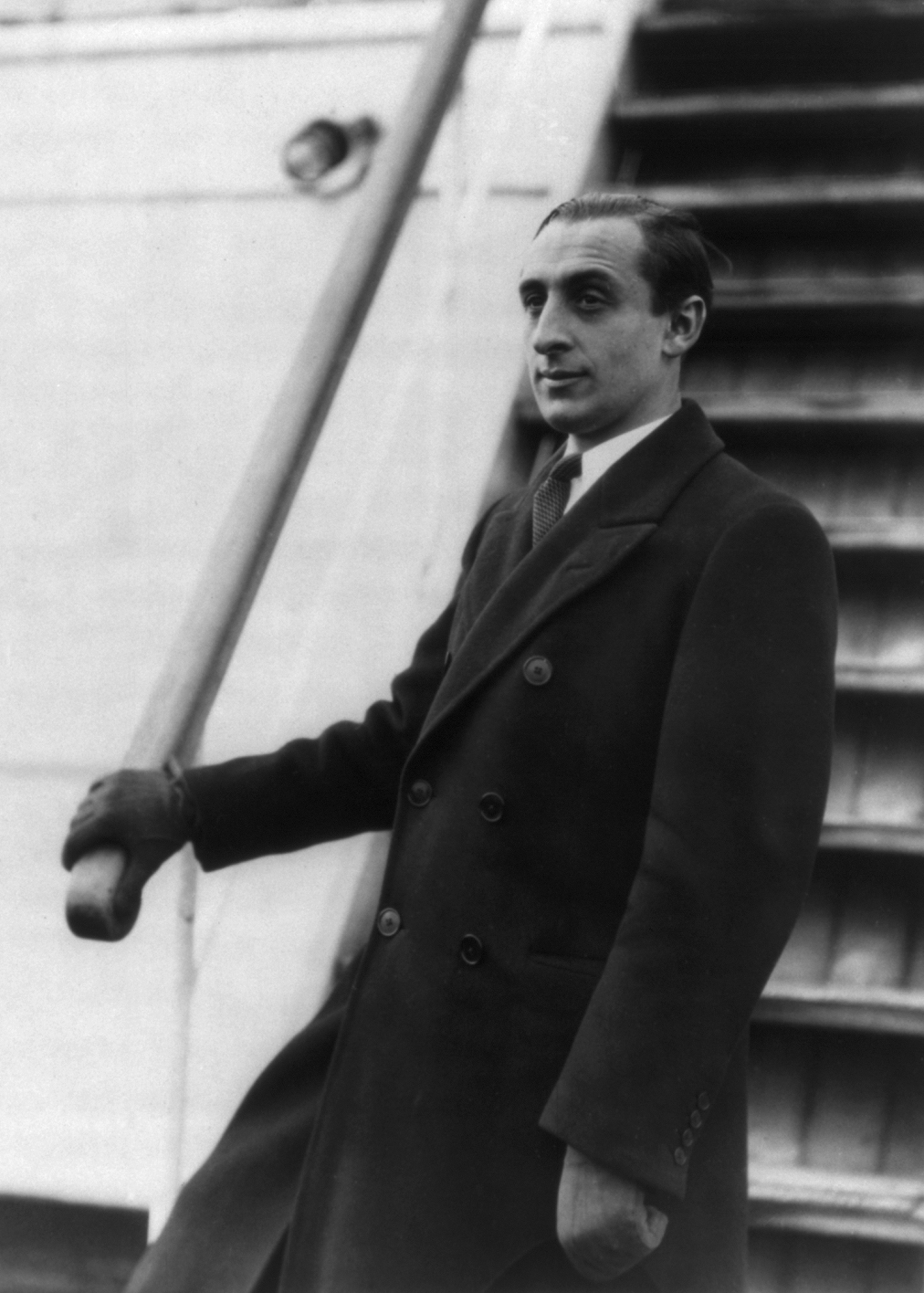
Vladimir Horowitz (1903–1989)

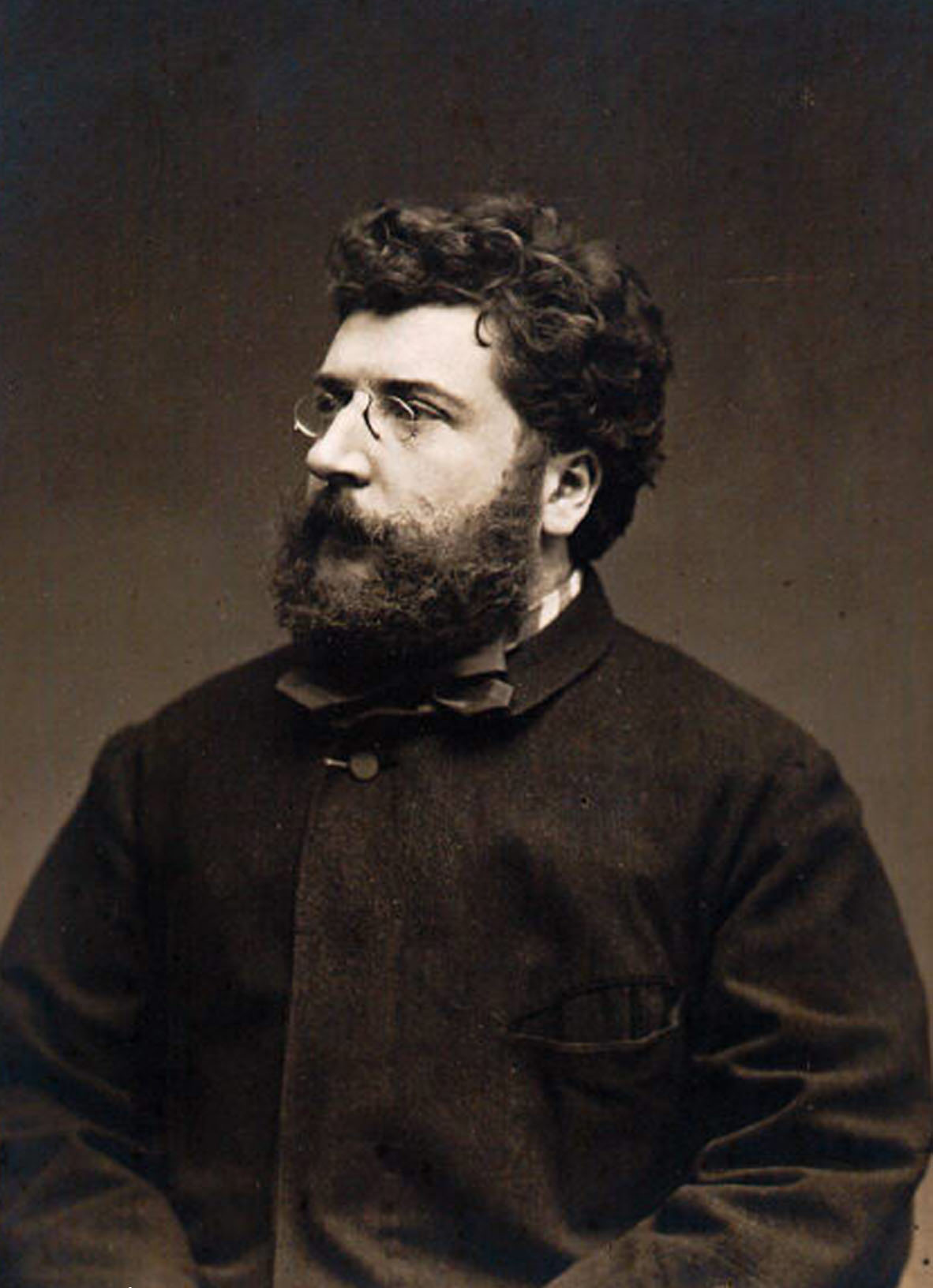
Georges Bizet (1838–1875)

Variations on a Theme from Carmen is a set of variations composed and performed by the Russian-American pianist Vladimir Horowitz. They are based on the Gypsy Dance from Georges Bizet's opera Carmen (1875).

== Background ==
Of Horowitz's many transcriptions, the "Carmen Variations" was the only work to remain in his repertoire throughout his career. He played the Variations from his earliest concerts in the 1920s, when he delighted his audiences with the "show stopping" encore, through to his golden jubilee season in 1978, over 50 years later.

The main theme of the piece originates from the energetic Gypsy Dance from act 2 of Bizet's opera Carmen (Les tringles des sistres tintaient), a theme that has been used by many for various other variations and transcriptions, including Moritz Moszkowski's "Chanson bohème de l'opéra Carmen".

Horowitz wished the piece not to be published. He performed it in many concerts and showed it to a couple of friends and acquaintances, and even made a piano roll of the piece, but kept the score to himself.

Horowitz's audiences loved the "Carmen Variations" and he performed them frequently. Eventually, he tired of this, concluding that his audiences forgot the rest of the programme after the encore.

== Analysis ==
Carmen Variations

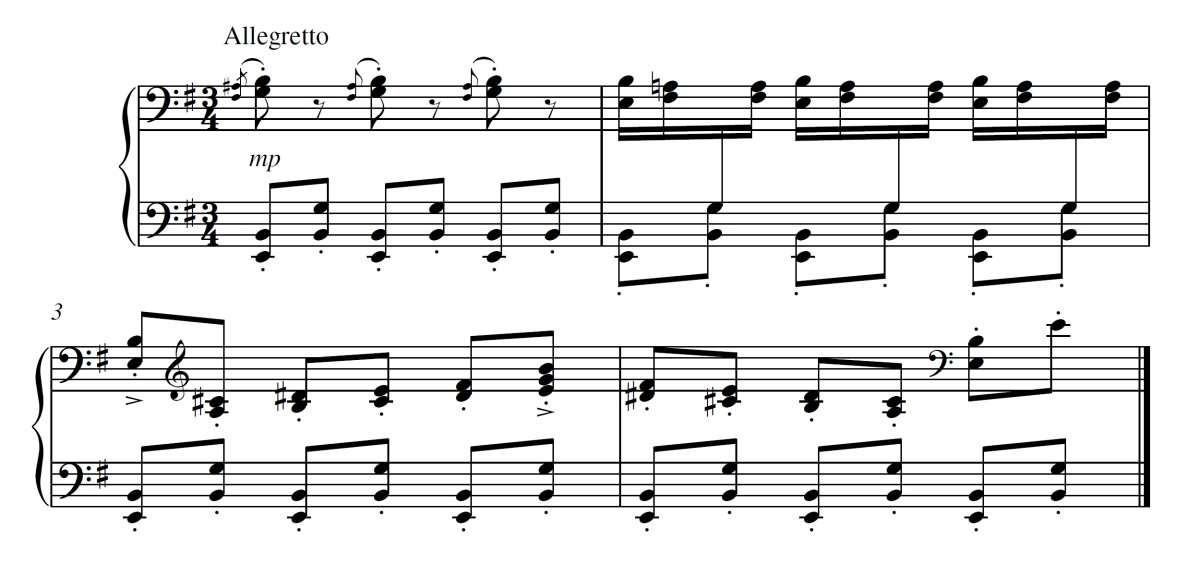
The first few bars of the Carmen Variations (1968 Version)

The piece begins with the basic unchanged theme in a rapid tempo, however, the mood soon turns playful but with an increasing technical demand on the pianist. Notes cascade from the upper register and rhythms become even wilder.

In the latter section, a variant of the theme is played in the lower register, providing a calmer and less hectic atmosphere, but this does not last.

After an intricate, chromatic scale passage, taking the form of a short cadenza, the music suddenly explodes into mayhem and Horowitz blows the main theme through the roof, showing huge virtuosity, power and a brilliant technique at the keyboard.

The coda of the piece concludes with the usual Horowitz-Style interlocking octaves, taking the form of an ascending chromatic scale and a few final mighty chords, all versions of the variations contain this in some form or another.

In these variations Horowitz displays the heights of his powers and technique.

== Versions ==
The piece changed over time. It is almost strictly a virtuoso showpiece, but as the years progressed, the variations became more sophisticated. Here are the five main versions of the piece:

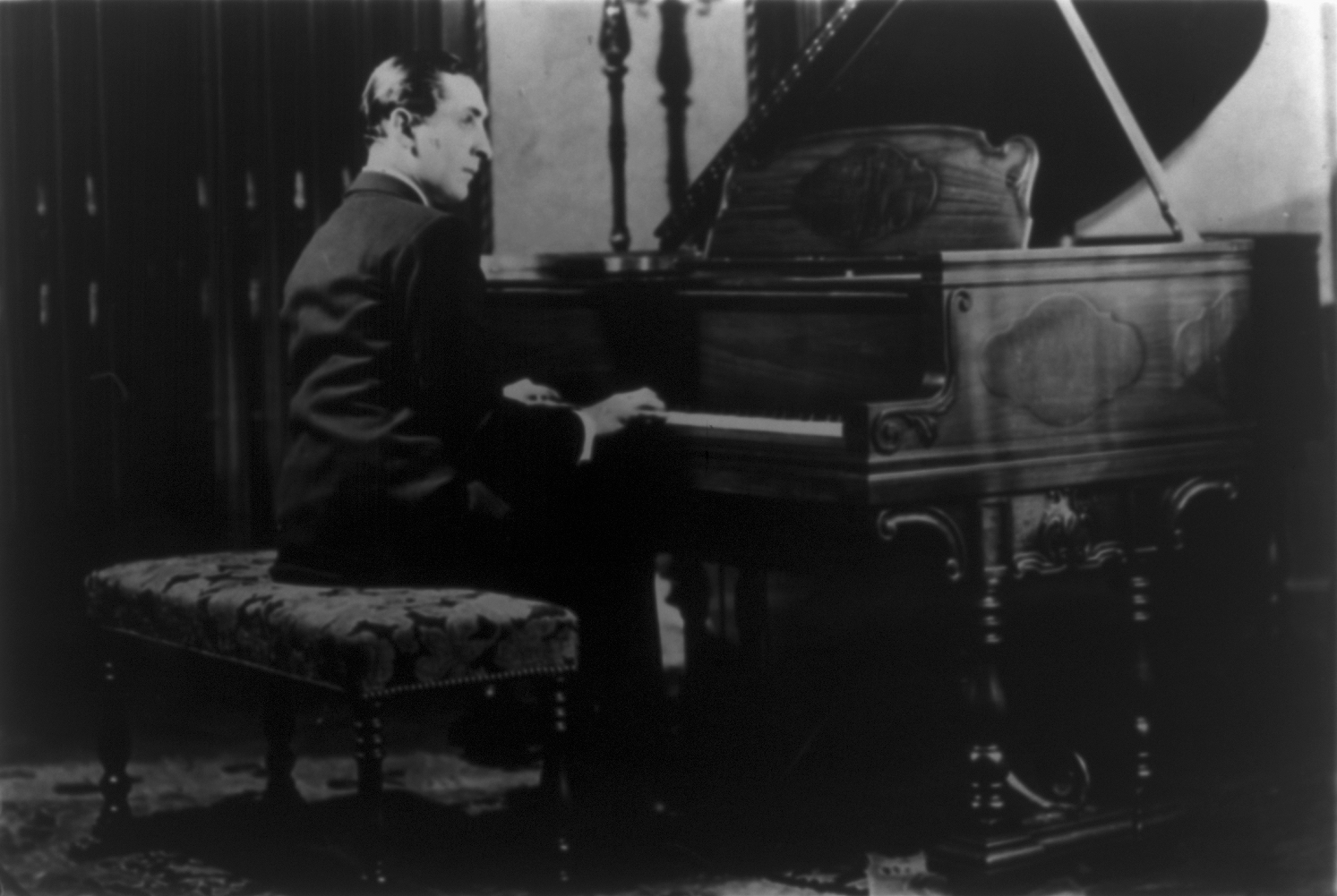
Horowitz at the time of his first recordings

=== 1927 ===
Horowitz's first recordings were on a piano roll for Welte and Sons in January 1927 and in 1928 for Duo-Art. Also in 1928 Horowitz made his first disc recording of the piece for Victor, taking five attempts before a satisfactory take was approved. Takes 1–3 were cut on 26 March and takes 4 and 5 on 2 April. Take 5 was chosen for issue and the others were destroyed. In these early performances we hear the youthful Horowitz's hasty fingers. Two further takes were made on 25 February 1930 but these were destroyed.

=== 1947 ===
There is a live recording from 1942 and a similar studio version recorded in 1947. There were not many changes from the 1928 version save that the cadenza was completely new.

=== 1957 ===
In the middle of his long retirement from the concert stage from 1953 until 1965, Horowitz considered a return in 1957 and worked on a new version of his Variations. This version was not just a flashy encore, but a full length concert piece. We see some new developments; the variations are more varied and the coda is almost completely new. Unfortunately he did not return to the stage to perform it and the recording was not released until after his death.

=== 1968 ===
In 1965, Horowitz ended his retirement and began performing again. He soon brought back his "Carmen Variations" and the public heard it for the first time in nearly 20 years. Though this version contained some of the changes made in 1957, it had been restored to its usual encore form with little change from the 1947 version. Horowitz performed the piece at his famous Carnegie Hall concert in 1968 televised by CBS, with some minor changes from the 1967 version, mostly alterations to the coda.

In 2009 a recording from 1967 was released with slight differences to the coda.

=== 1978 ===
The last recording of the "Carmen Variations" occurred in February 1978 at Horowitz's televised White House concert, celebrating the 50th anniversary of his American debut. This version is similar to that of 1968 save for a few small alterations and addition of several items from the 1957 version including some of the coda.

In 1985 during the filming of The Last Romantic, Horowitz included a few bars.

== Recordings ==
=== Horowitz's recordings ===
Recording date	Duration	Record label	Album
1926/2009	03:58	Tacet	The Welte Mignon Mystery, Vol. XI
1942	03:37	APR	Piano e forte, April 2000: APR Catalogue & Details of Special CD
1947	03:37	RCA Victor	Legendary RCA Recordings: Vladimir Horowitz, The Indispensable
1957	06:55	RCA Red Seal	RCA Red Seal Century: Soloists and Conductors
1968	03:58	Sony Masterworks	The Legendary 1968 TV Concert

=== Recordings by other pianists ===
Pianist	Duration	Record label	Recording date	Album
Arcadi Volodos	03:39	Sony Classical	1996	Volodos
Ladislav Fanzowitz	04:02	Diskant	2005	Ladislav Fanzowitz plays Horowitz, Godowsky, Balakirev & Liszt
Valery Kuleshov	04:19	BIS Records	2000	Hommage à Horowitz
Denis Matsuev	03:26	RCA Red Seal	2003	Tribute to Horowitz
Yuja Wang	03:39	Deutsche Grammophon	2012	Fantasia

== See also ==
- List of variations on a theme by another composer
