= Waltzes, Op. 69 (Chopin) =

1835 composition by Frédéric Chopin

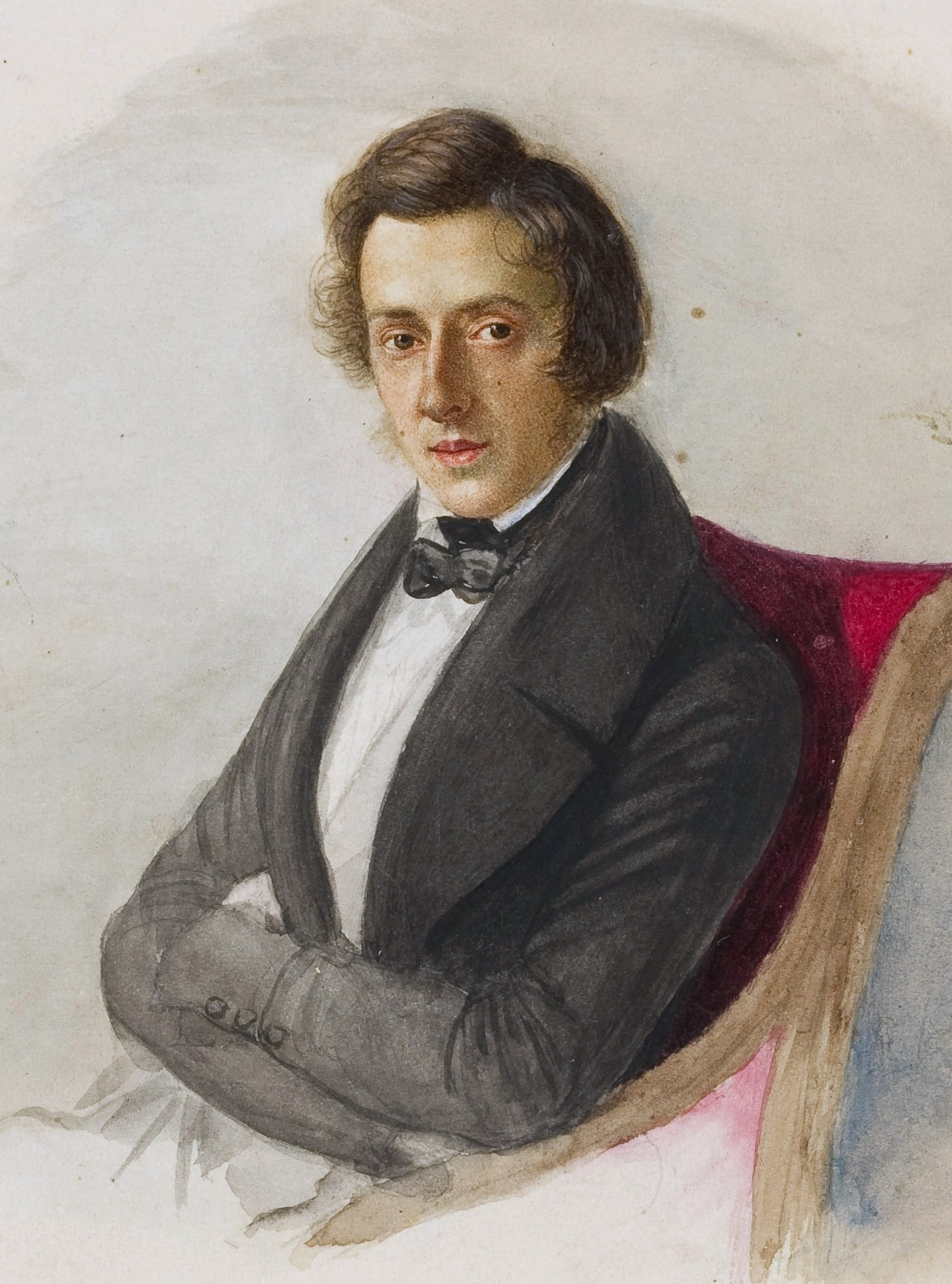
Frédéric Chopin at 25, by his fiancée Maria Wodzińska, 1835

The Waltzes, Op. 69 refers to two waltzes for solo piano by Frédéric Chopin, written in 1829 and 1835. Both were published posthumously by Chopin’s friend Julian Fontana in 1855.

== Pieces ==
=== No. 1 in A♭ major ===
The Waltz in A♭ major, Op. 69, is a waltz composed by Frédéric Chopin in 1835. It was posthumously published by his friend Julian Fontana in 1855, six years after the composer's death. It is also called "The Farewell Waltz" or "Valse de l'adieu".

Waltz in A♭ major, Op. 69, No. 1
Performer: Luke Faulkner

The Waltz Op. 69, No. 1 was originally written as a farewell piece to Maria Wodzińska, to whom Chopin is said to have been engaged. This autographed copy Pour M^{lle} Marie, given to her in Dresden, Germany, in September 1835 is now lost. Another autographed version of the piece he dedicated in 1837 to Eliza Peruzzi. A third autograph, held by the Bibliothèque nationale de France, Chopin dedicated 1842 to Mademoiselle Charlotte de Rothschild. Various copies of this waltz exist, among them one presented as the posthumous edition of Julian Fontana, but it has not been substantiated by any known autograph.

The waltz is in A♭ major, with a time signature of 3/4. The tempo is marked at tempo di valse, or a waltz tempo. The beginning theme, marked con espressione, is melancholic and nostalgic, and reaches a small high point with a fast flourish. The second part is marked sempre delicatissimo, or con anima in other versions. It is somewhat more cheerful than the previous theme, but soon gives way to the same first theme. After a second rendition of the first theme is a third theme, marked as dolce, the most playful theme. It leads to another theme with a series of ascending double-stops. This fourth theme is marked poco a poco crescendo, with other editions adding ed appassionato. This leads back to the third, playful theme, and returns to the beginning with a da capo al fin.

=== No. 2 in B minor ===
Waltz in B minor, Op. 69, No. 2
Performed by Olga Gurevich

The Waltz Op. 69, No. 2 was composed for solo piano in the year 1829 at the age of 19. The piece was published in 1852 together with the Waltz in F minor, Op. 70 No. 2. It was also published posthumously in 1855 by his friend Julian Fontana. The main theme is in the key of B minor and is marked with an overall tempo of Moderato.

The piece consists of three main themes. The first theme is sixteen measures long and is repeated again on the last page of the piece. The second theme, marked con anima, is of eight measures which is then repeated again with slight variations, along with the reprise of the main theme, also varied. Together they form a kind of aa, bb', a' structure. The Trio in B major consists of only a single theme of eight bars repeated. The sixteen bars are then repeated again with a modulation back to B minor. The section can be structured as c, c'. The return of the first section is without repeats, forming a ternary form (ABA).

The composer had instructed that his unpublished works, including these waltzes, be burnt upon his death.
