= Mazurkas, Op. 33 (Chopin) =

1838 compositions by Frédéric Chopin

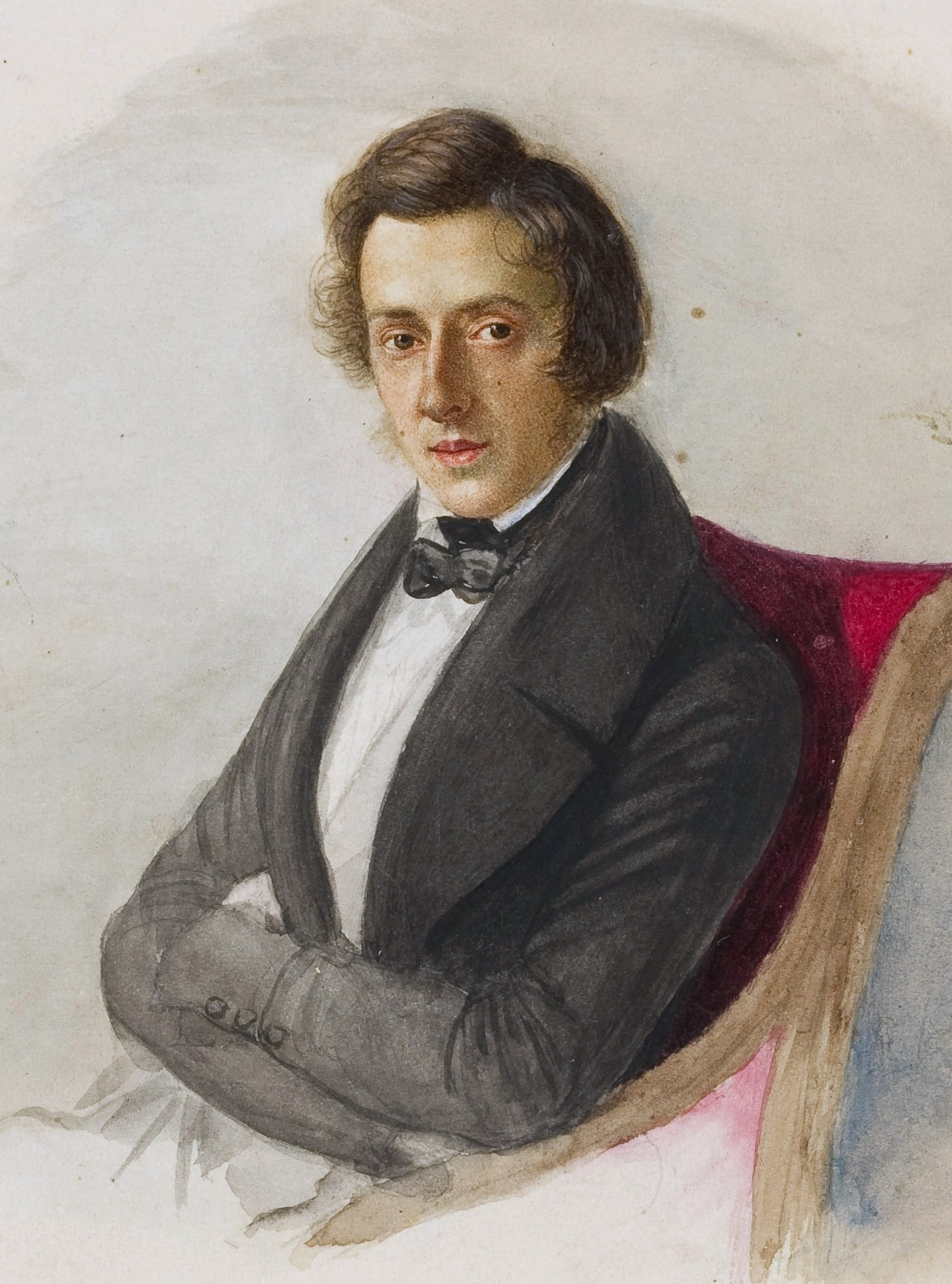
Chopin, 1835

Mazurkas, Op. 33, are a set of four mazurkas for piano by Frédéric Chopin, composed and published in 1838. The pieces were dedicated to Countess Róża Mostowska.

The autograph manuscript of the mazurkas is preserved in the National Library of Poland.

== Analysis ==
=== No. 1 in G♯ minor ===
In G-sharp minor, the opening mazurka of the set has a tempo marking of Mesto. The piece, spanning a total of 48 bars, has the dynamic marking forte marked twice in an otherwise quiet solitude. This intimate piece is considered less complicated than many of Chopin's other mazurkas.

=== No. 2 in D major ===
No. 2
Performed by Lubka Kolessa

Mazurka in D major, Op. 33, No. 2, the second piece of the collection, is one of the most popular mazurkas. It has a fast tempo and strong, irregular accents.

The piece begins with a joyful theme decorated with ornaments. After a second theme is introduced, the main theme is repeated for a second time. The main theme oscillates between D and A major on both entrances. The mazurka concludes with a separate coda section that introduces a brief new theme before ending with an ascending folk scale high into the upper register.

An average performance of this mazurka lasts around 3 minutes.

=== No. 3 in C major ===
Mazurka in C major, Op. 33, No. 3, the third of the set, has an expression marking of semplice. This miniature is warm and almost resembles a lullaby, showing a different approach to the mazurka genre. Slightly accented second beats preserve the mazurka identity.

=== No. 4 in B minor ===
No. 4

The final mazurka in B minor is one of the longest mazurkas at an approximate length of 5 to 6 minutes. The piece is written in an A–B–A–B–C–A structure, similar to rondo form.

The piece begins with a captivating main melody decorated with grace notes and trills. This melody is repeated a total of eight times throughout the piece; between it, different melodies appear, but the main melody always returns. The B section in B♭ major follows the theme. The C section is in B major, the parallel key of B minor.
