= Nocturne in E minor, Op. posth. 72 (Chopin) =

Nocturne composed by Frédéric Chopin

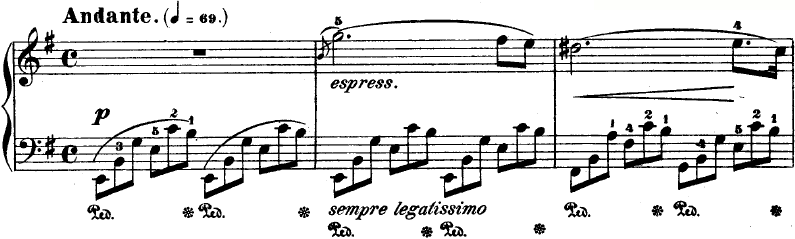
Opening bars of Nocturne No. 19 in E minor.

The Nocturne in E minor, Op. posth. 72 No. 1, WN 23, was composed by Frédéric Chopin for solo piano in 1827. It was Chopin's first composed nocturne, although it was the nineteenth to be published, in 1855, along with two other early works: a funeral march in C minor and three écossaises. The composition features an unbroken line of quaver triplets in the left hand set against a slow melody of minims, crotchets, quaver duplets and triplets. It consists of 57 bars of common time with the tempo given as Andante, = 69 bpm.

== Background ==
According to Casimir Wierzyknski, in his book The Life and Death of Chopin, "up until then this form [the nocturne] had been the exclusive domain of John Field, an Irish-born composer. But his Nocturne in E minor did not satisfy him [Chopin] and was published only posthumously."

== Form ==
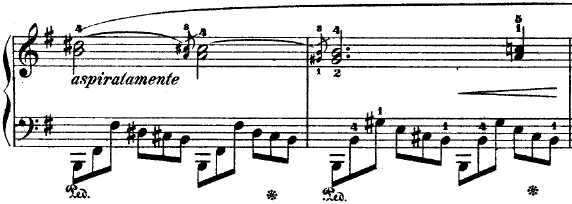
A secondary theme, in B major.

An informal analysis of the piece is as follows:

- Bar 1: Introduction, first subject.
- Bar 2–9: Theme A, in E minor.
- Bar 10–17: Variation on theme A, beginning with octaves in the right hand.
- Bar 18–22: Interlude
- Bar 23–30: Theme B, in B major, consisting of a four bar phrase, repeated with variation, second subject.
- Bar 31–38: Heavily ornamented variation on A, in E minor, first subject again.
- Bar 39–46: Variation on theme A, beginning with octaves in the right hand.
- Bar 47–54: Theme B, modulated to E major, second subject again.
- Bar 55–57: Coda in E major.

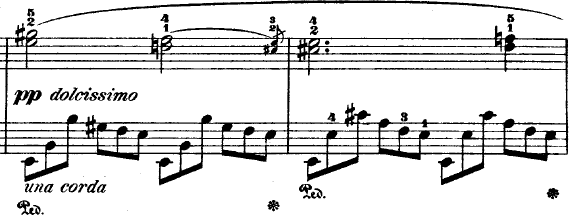
Second entrance of second theme, in E major.

== Use in modern culture ==
This piece was played by the actor Jeri Ryan while portraying Seven of Nine at the beginning of the Star Trek: Voyager episode "Human Error". The piece was also performed by Doc Holiday in the 1993 movie Tombstone and was used as the main theme in The Secret Garden (1987).
