= Étincelles (Moszkowski) =

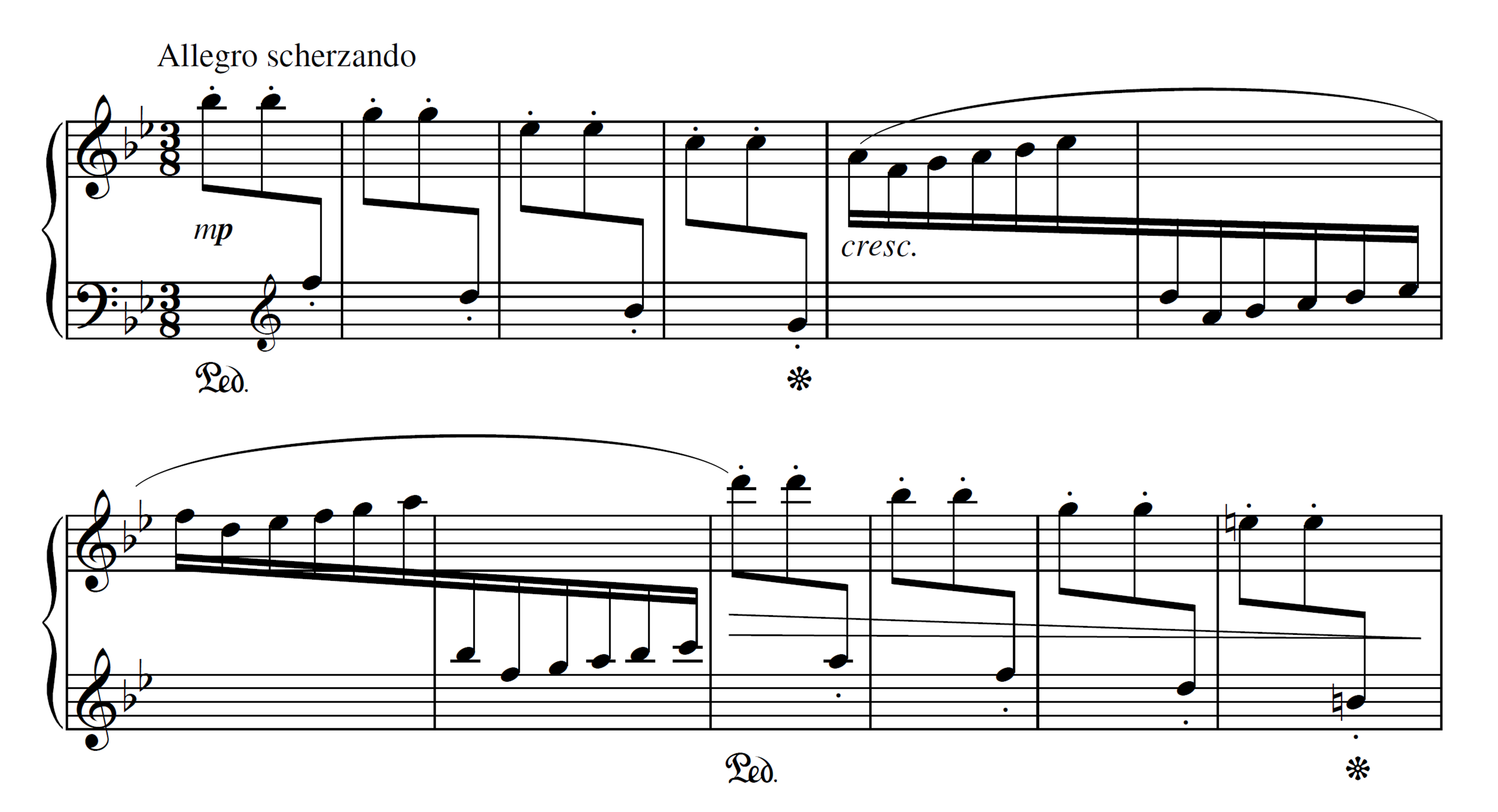
The opening of Moszkowski's Étincelles

Étincelles, Op. 36 No. 6 (Sparks) is a piece for solo piano by Moritz Moszkowski. It is the sixth piece from Moszkowski's 8 Characteristic Pieces set.

== Analysis ==
This flashy showpiece, as the name suggests, conveys images of flashing sparks through the use of a staccato theme and extremely fast scale passages, which require a great deal of technical ability. The piece is written in the key of B-flat major and in 3/8 time. A happy and lively mood is consistent throughout the piece although the dynamics are nearly always quiet.

Étincelles has a duration of about three minutes.

== Performances ==
Étincelles, Op. 36, No. 6
Created in MIDI and recorded from a digital piano, 2:31.

Étincelles, Op. 36, No. 6
Performed by Andriy Bondarenko (1998), 2:33.

Étincelles is a popular piece and many famous pianists have recorded it. In particular the pianist Vladimir Horowitz played the piece frequently as an encore at many of his later concerts. He also composed his own coda to the piece.

== See also ==
- List of compositions by Moritz Moszkowski
