= Trois nouvelles études =

1839 piano studies by Frédéric Chopin

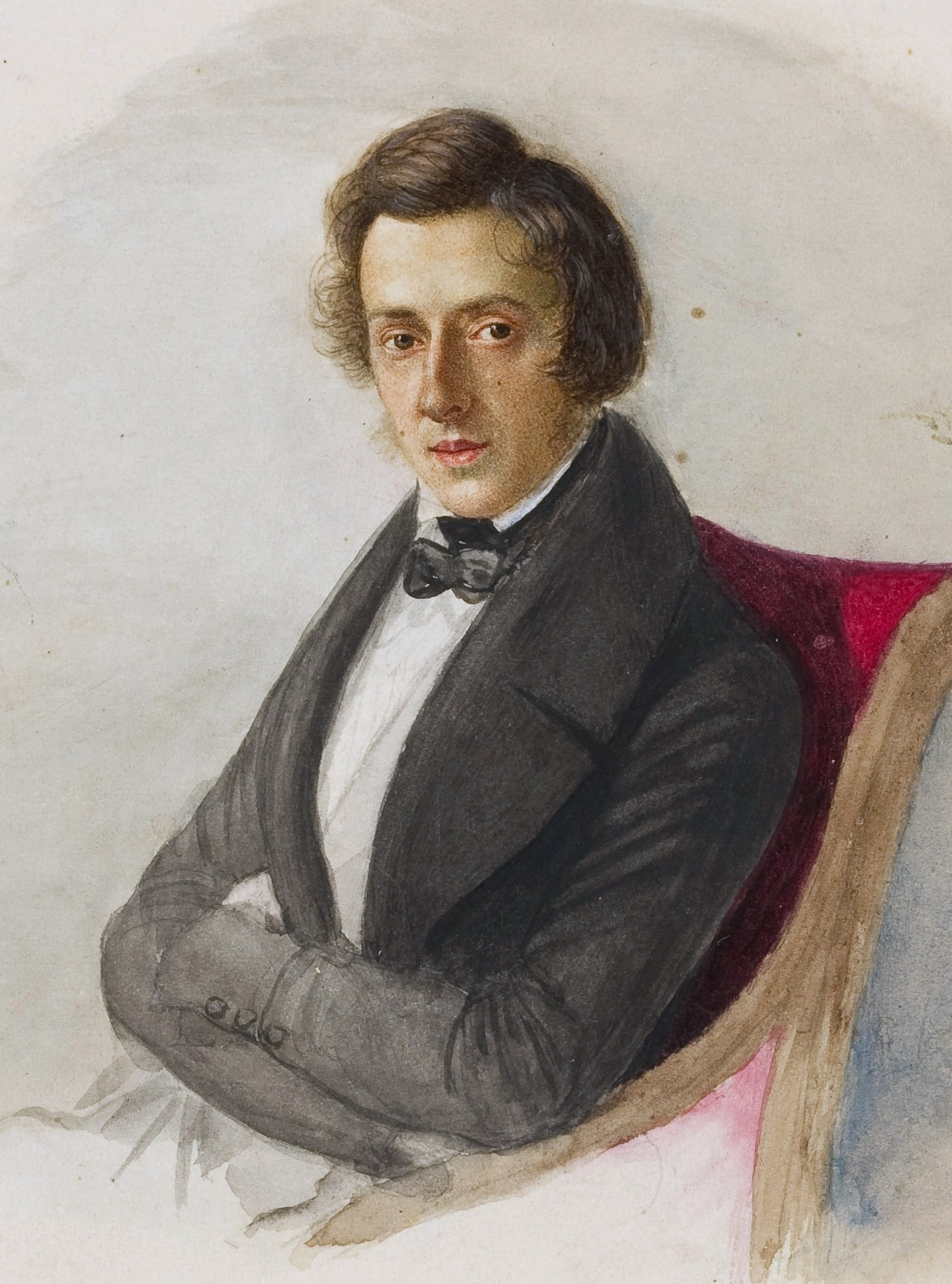
Chopin in 1835 by Maria Wodzinska

Frédéric Chopin wrote his Trois nouvelles études ("three new studies"), B. 130, for piano in 1839, as a contribution to "Méthode des méthodes de piano", a piano instruction book by Ignaz Moscheles and François-Joseph Fétis. These études are less technical than the composer's Op. 10 and 25 and retain Chopin's original formula for harmonic and structural balance. Despite their lack of an opus number, these three études were published during the composer's lifetime.

== Études ==
1. The first of the Trois nouvelles études is an intimate piece in F minor. It develops students' facility with 3-on-4 polyrhythms.
2. The key of the second étude is A♭ major sits atop a series of chords in the right hand with a simple bass in the left hand. It develops students' facility with 2-on-3 polyrhythms.
3. The third and last étude, in D♭ major, is the most technically challenging in this collection. It develops independence of voices and articulation in the right hand, with the upper melodic line quite legato over a staccato alto accompaniment. Some of the reaches required between the alto and soprano lines may be difficult for pianists with smaller hands.

No. 1 Martha Goldstein playing on an Érard piano (1851) (2.76 MB) No. 1 Performed by Muriel Nguyen Xuan	No. 2 Martha Goldstein playing on an Érard (1851) (2.78 MB) No. 2 Performed by Donald Betts	No. 3 Martha Goldstein playing on an Érard (1851) (1.87 MB)
