= Étude Op. 10, No. 8 (Chopin) =

Composition by Frédéric Chopin

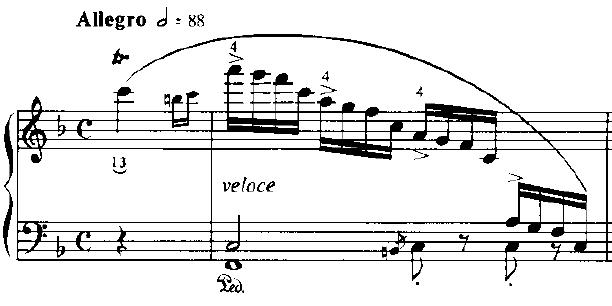
Excerpt from the beginning of Étude Op. 10, No. 8

Étude Op. 10, No. 8 in F major is a technical study composed by Frédéric Chopin. This work follows on from No. 7 as being primarily another work concerned with counterpoint. In this case, however, the principal melody is in the left hand, the secondary being embedded in the arpeggios of the right hand. As with many of the études, the work is divided into three sections – bars 1–28, 29–60 and 61–95.

The first section (bars 1–28) features a right-hand figuration that is straightforward with the accent falling always on the first note of each group of four semiquavers throughout the work. The main difficulty is that they must be played forte and legato at speed, ascending and descending sequentially over the keyboard. Due to the obligation to sustain the left-hand melody somehow whilst still keeping the right hand's figure clear, this presents a great difficulty.

The central section (bars 29–60) features elaborations on the original figuration. The D minor lasts only 7 bars before undergoing an extended series of modulations right through to bar 60 – the return to the main theme. This section contains a further exercise in hands moving in opposite and complementary directions (bars 42–47 and 53–60) – this builds on the exercises in No. 4. As with the opening section, the accent always falls on the first note of each group of four semiquavers.

The final section (bars 61–95) is a brief restatement of the opening theme with the transition into the coda beginning at bar 71. The coda proper begins at bar 75. Bar 89 onwards contains parallel motion in both hands played forte and leading directly into the final arpeggiated cadences played fortissimo.

Étude No. 8
Martha Goldstein playing on an Erard (1851)
