= Moment exotique =

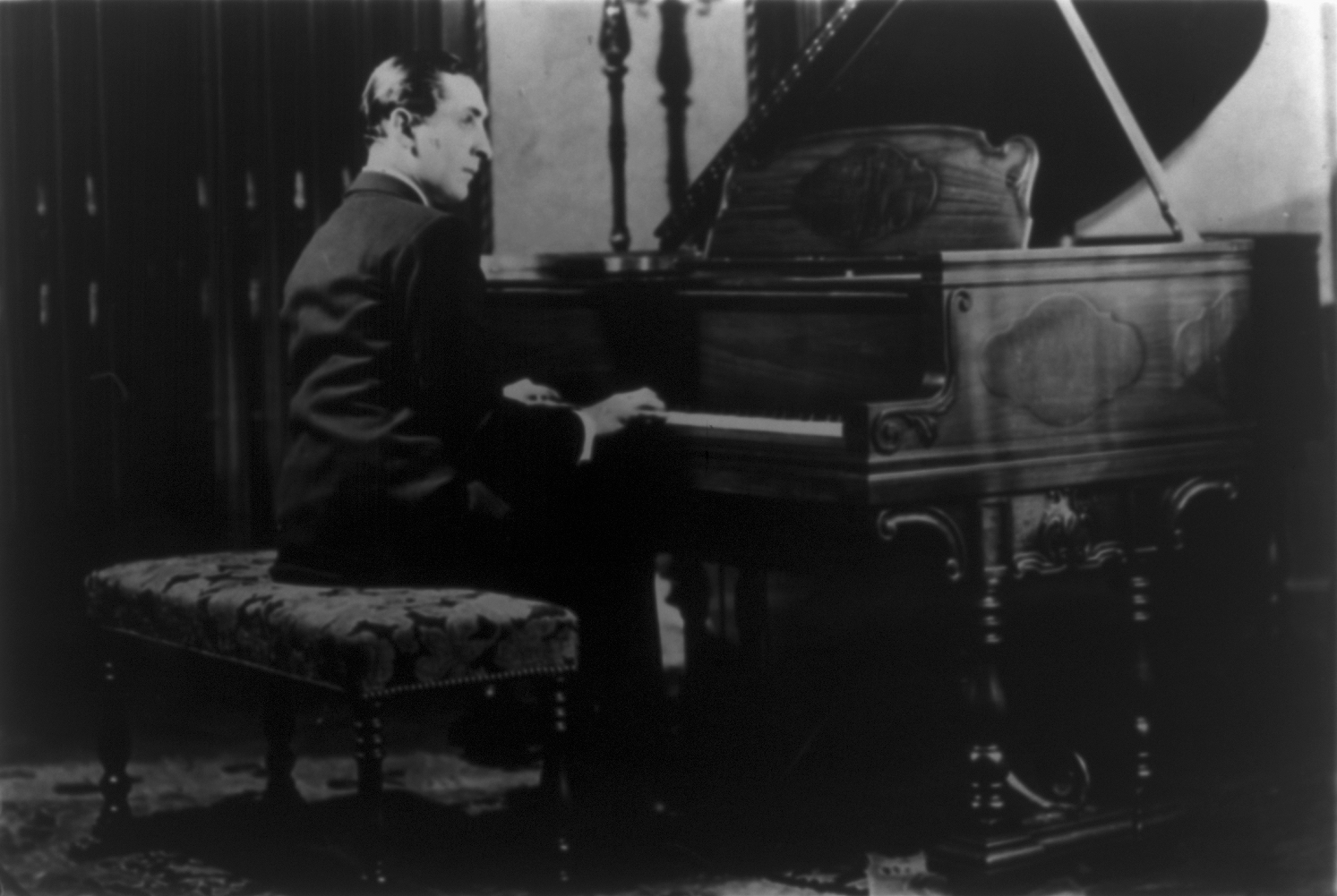
Vladimir Horowitz seated at the piano.

Moment exotique, also known as Danse excentrique, is a short concert piece for solo piano by the Russian pianist Vladimir Horowitz.

== Background ==
The piece is thought to have been composed in either 1920 or 1921, before Horowitz left Russia. He originally composed the piece for his brother's 18th birthday party. Horowitz first recorded the piece on a piano roll for Welte-Mignon in 1926 and later went on to record it for RCA Records in 1930, this time as an audio recording.

== Analysis ==
The piece is written in a cakewalk style. It is a colorful and cheery piece lasting around two and a half minutes.
