= Piano Sonata No. 7 (Beethoven) =

Piano sonata written by Beethoven

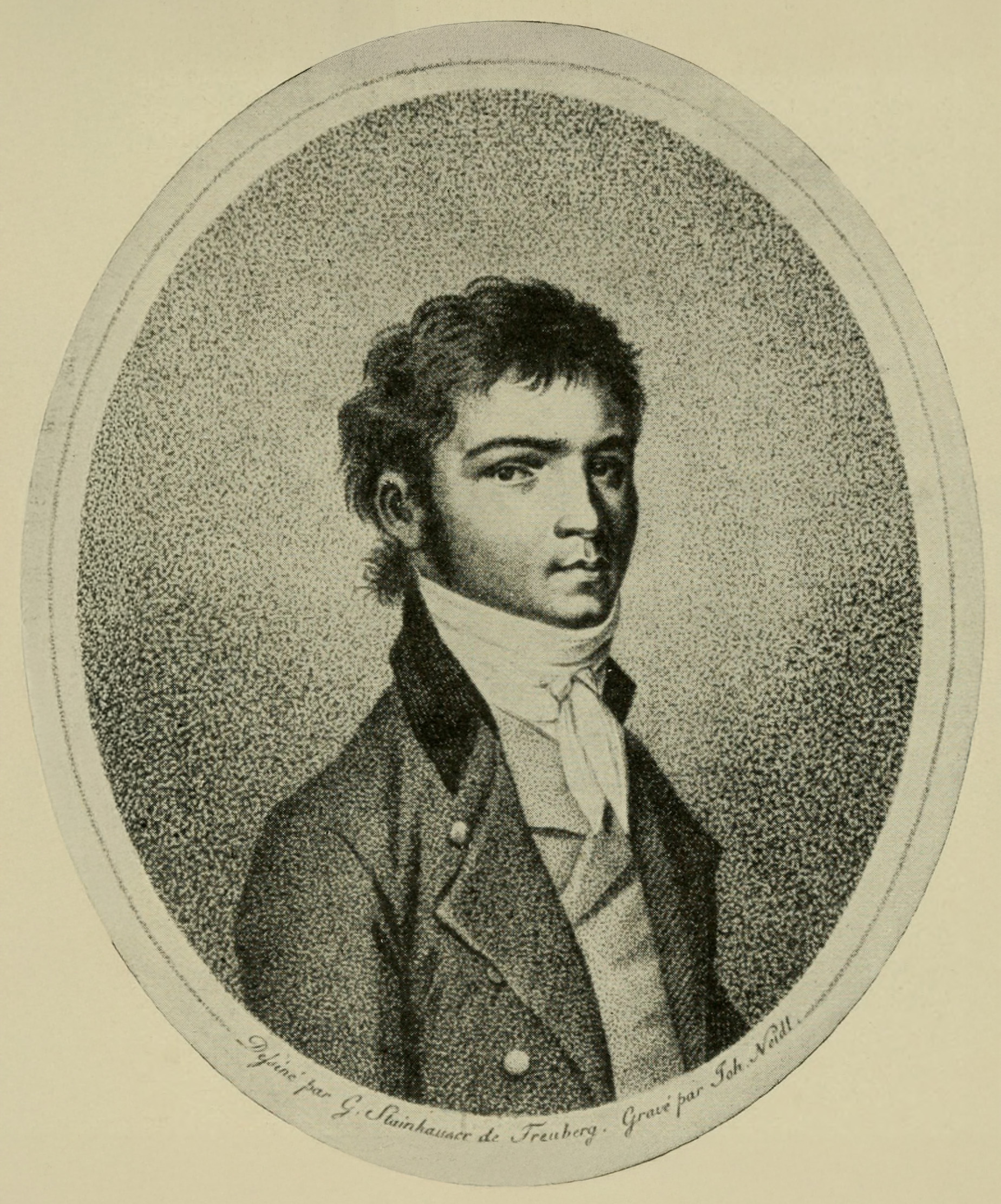
Beethoven in 1796; designed by G. Stainhauser; engraving by Johann Josef Neidl, executed for the publisher Artaria

I. Presto

II. Largo e mesto

III. Menuetto: Allegro

IV. Rondo
Played by Artur Schnabel in 1932

Ludwig van Beethoven's Piano Sonata No. 7 in D major, Op. 10, No. 3, was dedicated to the Countess Anne Margarete von Browne, and written in 1798. This makes it contemporary with his three Op. 9 string trios, his three Op. 12 violin sonatas, and the violin and orchestra romance that became his Op. 50 when later published. The year also saw the premiere of a revised version of his second piano concerto, whose original form had been written and heard in 1795.

== Music ==
The Op. 10 sonatas are usually described as angular or experimental, as Beethoven began moving further and further away from his earlier models. This third sonata of the set is the longest at approximately 24 minutes. It is the only one of the Op. 10 sonatas that has four movements:

1. Presto,
2. Largo e mesto, 6/8, D minor
3. Menuetto: Allegro, 3/4, D major → G major → D major
4. Rondo: Allegro,

=== I. Presto ===
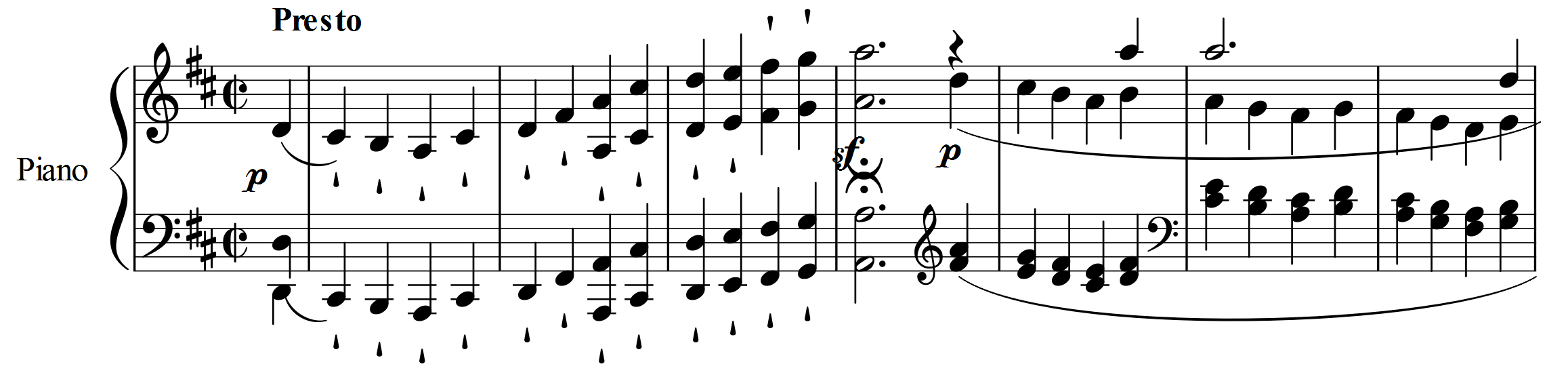

The first movement is in sonata form.

=== II. Largo e mesto ===
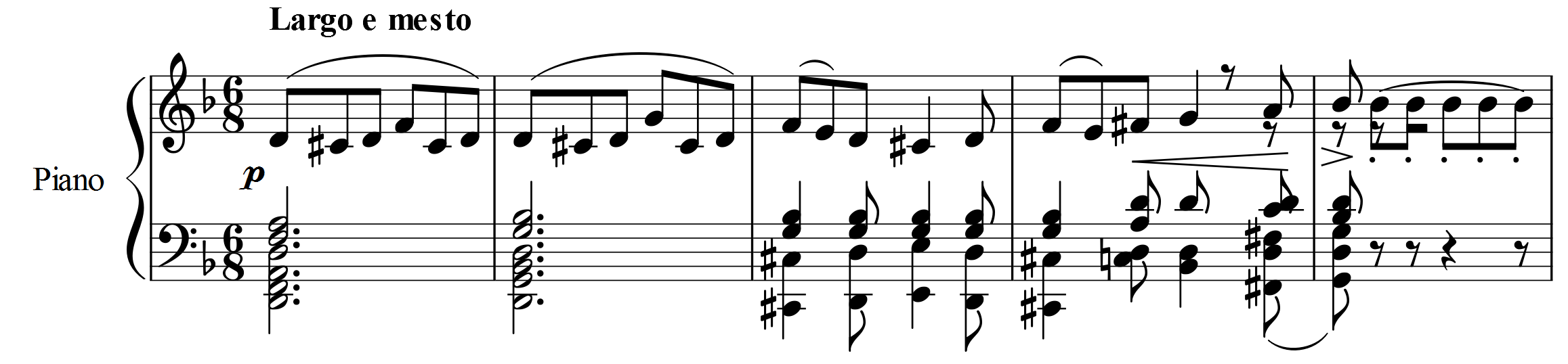

The second movement is a slow movement in ternary form. This movement is in the parallel key of D minor.

=== III. Menuetto: Allegro ===
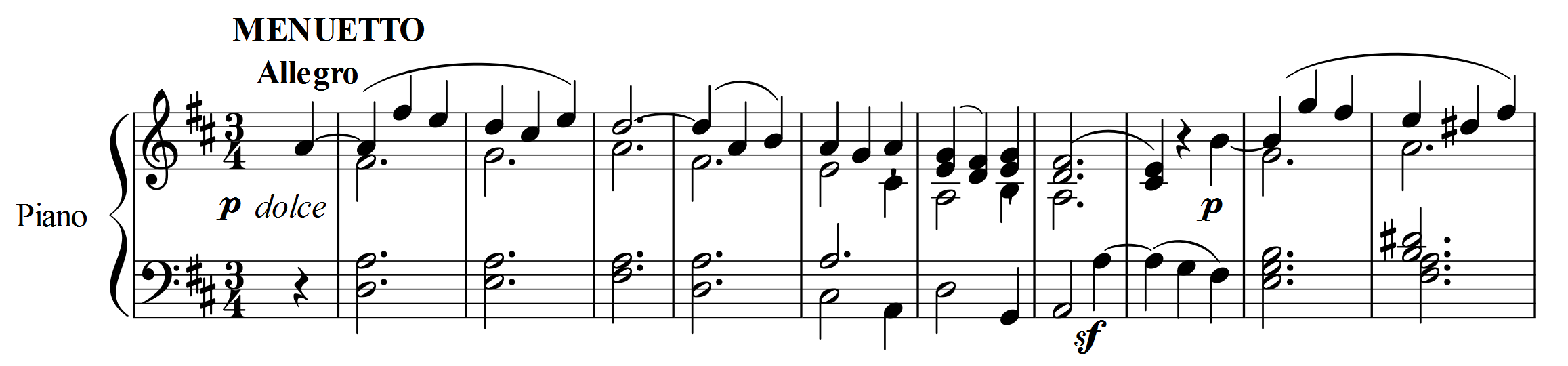

The third movement is in compound ternary form (minuet and trio). The minuet is in D major, the main key of the sonata and the trio is in the subdominant key of G major.

=== IV. Rondo: Allegro ===
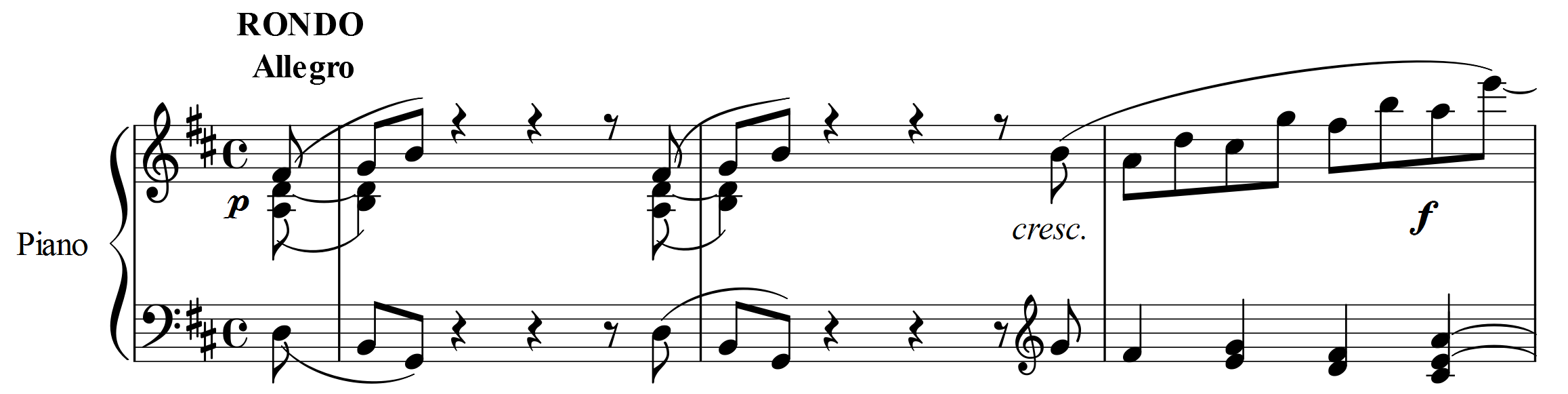

The fourth movement is in rondo form (A-B-A-C-A-D-A-Coda).
