= Étude in D-sharp minor, Op. 8, No. 12 =

Étude for piano by Alexander Scriabin

The opening of the étude features large jumps in left hand part.

Étude Op. 8, No. 12
Awadagin Pratt performs Alexander Scriabin's Étude Op. 8, No. 12 at the White House Classical Music Student Workshop Concert. (2009-11-04)

Étude Op. 8, No. 12
played by Domenico Stigliani

Étude in D♯ minor, Op. 8, No. 12, is an étude for piano composed by Alexander Scriabin in 1894. Its technical challenges include numerous jumps in the left hand, repetitive chord strikes, and abundant octaves. It was a favorite encore of Vladimir Horowitz.

== Technique ==
The tempo marking for the piece is around 100-112 beats per minute. The right hand is always playing octaves except for the piece's ending.
