= Mazurkas, Op. 41 (Chopin) =

Set of piano pieces by Frédéric Chopin

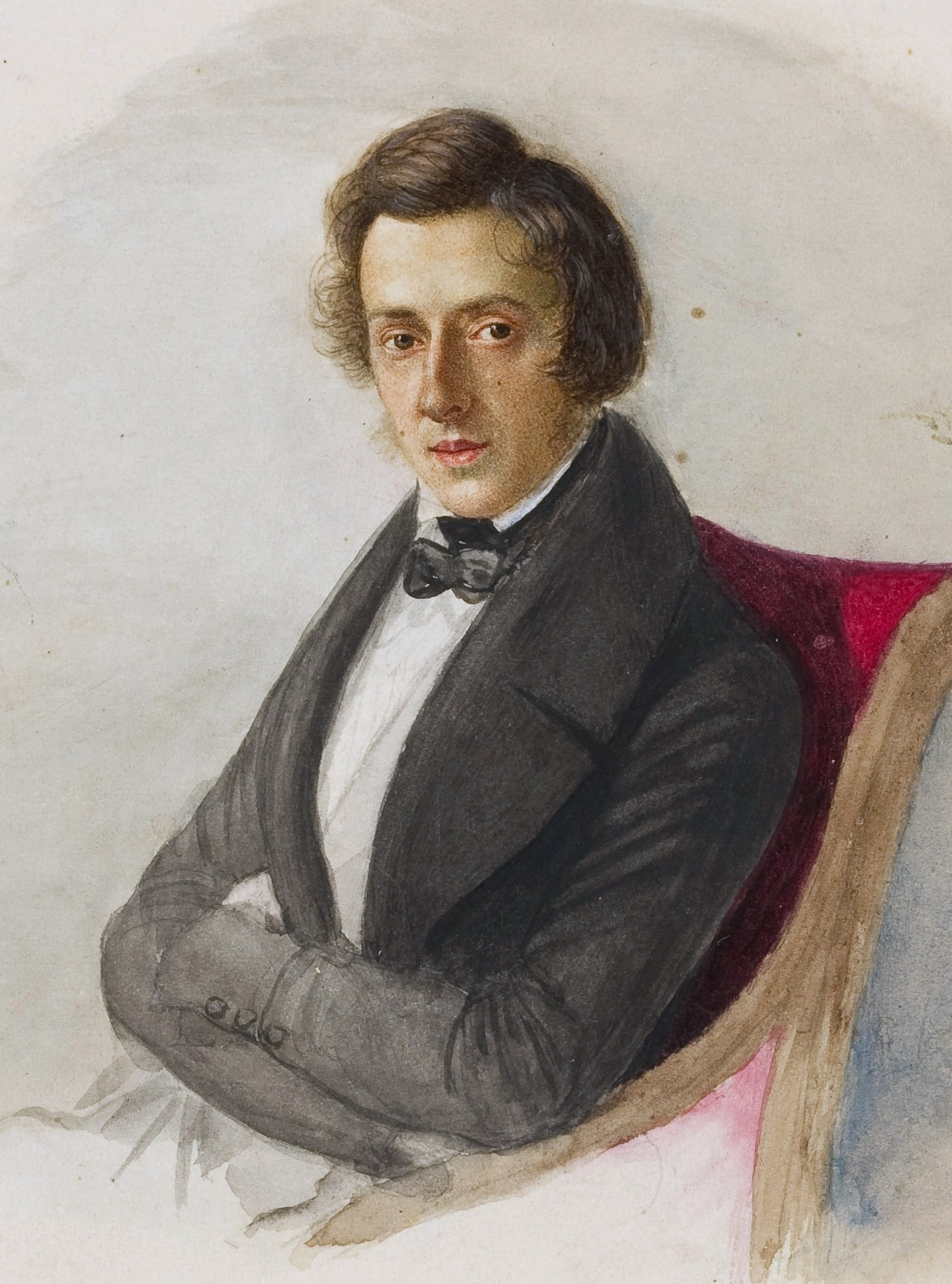
Frédéric Chopin, 1835

Mazurka in C♯ minor, Op. 41 No. 1

Mazurka in E minor, Op. 41 No. 2

Mazurka in B major, Op. 41 No. 3
Performed by Edward Neeman

Mazurka in A♭ major, Op. 41 No. 4

Mazurkas, Op. 41 is a set of four mazurkas for piano by Frédéric Chopin, composed and published between 1838 and 1839. A typical performance of the set lasts about nine and a half minutes. The set is dedicated to Chopin's friend Stefan Witwicki, a minor poet, ten of whose poems Chopin set to music as songs.

== Structure ==
The order here is the order in the first German edition. The first French and English editions placed the C♯ minor mazurka last rather than first.

=== Mazurka in C♯ minor, Op. 41, No. 1 ===
The first mazurka is in C♯ minor and has a time signature of 3/4. It also has the tempo marking: Maestoso.

The Mazurka in C♯ minor opens in the Phrygian mode by outlining the scale as a solo right hand melody with repetition as the left hand enters, followed by harmonic development in E major and a climactic resolution in C♯ major. Various distinct episodes introduce new key areas, many developing the dotted rhythm idea from the main theme.

=== Mazurka in E minor, Op. 41, No. 2 ===
The second mazurka is in E minor and has a time signature of 3/4, marked Andantino. The middle trio contains a repeated D♯ in the right hand.

=== Mazurka in B major, Op. 41, No. 3 ===
The third Mazurka is in B major and has a time signature of 3/4, marked Animato.

=== Mazurka in A♭ major, Op. 41, No. 4 ===
The final mazurka in the set is in A♭ major and has a time signature of 3/4, marked Allegretto.
