= Novelletten (Schumann) =

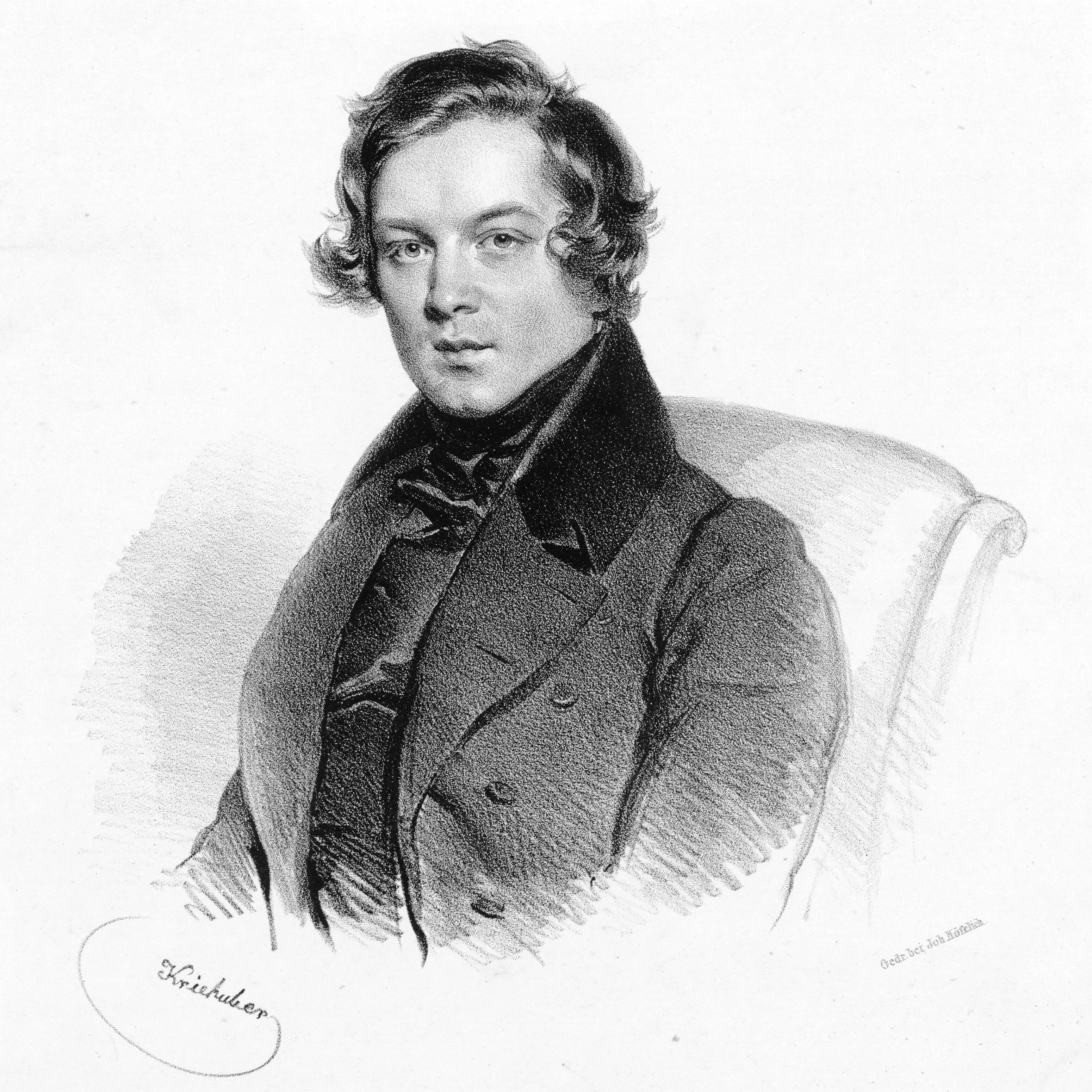
Schumann in 1839, one year after composing the Novelletten

The Novelletten, Op. 21, is a set of eight pieces for solo piano, written by Robert Schumann in 1838. This composition is dedicated to Adolf von Henselt.

== Background ==
The Novelletten were composed during February 1838, a period of great struggle for the composer. Schumann originally intended the eight pieces to be performed together as a group, though they are often performed separately.

The title was chosen in honour of the singer Clara Novello, who made a strong impression on Schumann during her concerts in Leipzig in the winter of 1837–38. At the same time, Schumann alludes to the literary genre of the Novelle, suggesting that the pieces in this cycle possess a narrative character.

This set of pieces is an excellent example of Schumann's keyboard style.

== Analysis ==
=== No. 1 in F major ===
- Markiert und kräftig (Marked and strong) Marcato e con forza

This piece contains seven sections, alternating between a staccato march and flowing legato passages. The piece is a modified Rondo form.

=== No. 2 in D major ===
- Äußerst rasch und mit Bravour (Extremely fast and with bravura) Prestissimo, arditamente

This virtuosic piece is graceful and effective. An Intermezzo section in the middle contrasts and varies the piece.

=== No. 3 in D major ===
- Leicht und mit Humor (Light and with humor) Leggero, con umore

This piece displays the composer's sense of humour through the use of rapid staccato chords. An Intermezzo section in the middle of the piece is used to contrast.

=== No. 4 in D major ===
- Ballmässig. Sehr munter (Ball-like. Very lively) In tempo di ballo, lietamente

This piece is quite loosely organized in terms of structure; it is an interesting waltz that uses cross-rhythms and syncopation effectively.

=== No. 5 in D major ===
- Rauschend und festlich (Glittering and festive) Con slancio festosamente

This piece is in the form of a polonaise; its principal section contains three main ideas which are then overcome by the persistent rhythms of the Trio section.

=== No. 6 in A major ===
- Sehr lebhaft, mit vielem Humor (Very lively, with much humor) Vivace e spiritoso assai

This piece uses an increasing tempo to characterize the progression of sections. Starting from the staccato opening, each of the following passages are marked a few metronome beats faster until the coda, which returns to the original tempo.

=== No. 7 in E major ===
- Äusserst rasch (Extremely fast) Prestissimo

This piece features a beautiful and lyrical middle section; it also features many virtuosic passages containing fast, brilliant octaves.

=== No. 8 in F♯ minor ===
- Sehr lebhaft (Very lively) Assai vivace

The concluding piece of the set is actually two pieces in one. The first part is a passionate étude in 2/4, the second has the nature of a march. The "voice from afar" in the second Trio section is a direct quote to the "Notturno" from Clara Wieck's 1836 published Soirées musicales op. 6, n. 2. The piece ends in D major, the principal key of the cycle.
