= Au bord d'une source =

Piece for piano by Franz Liszt

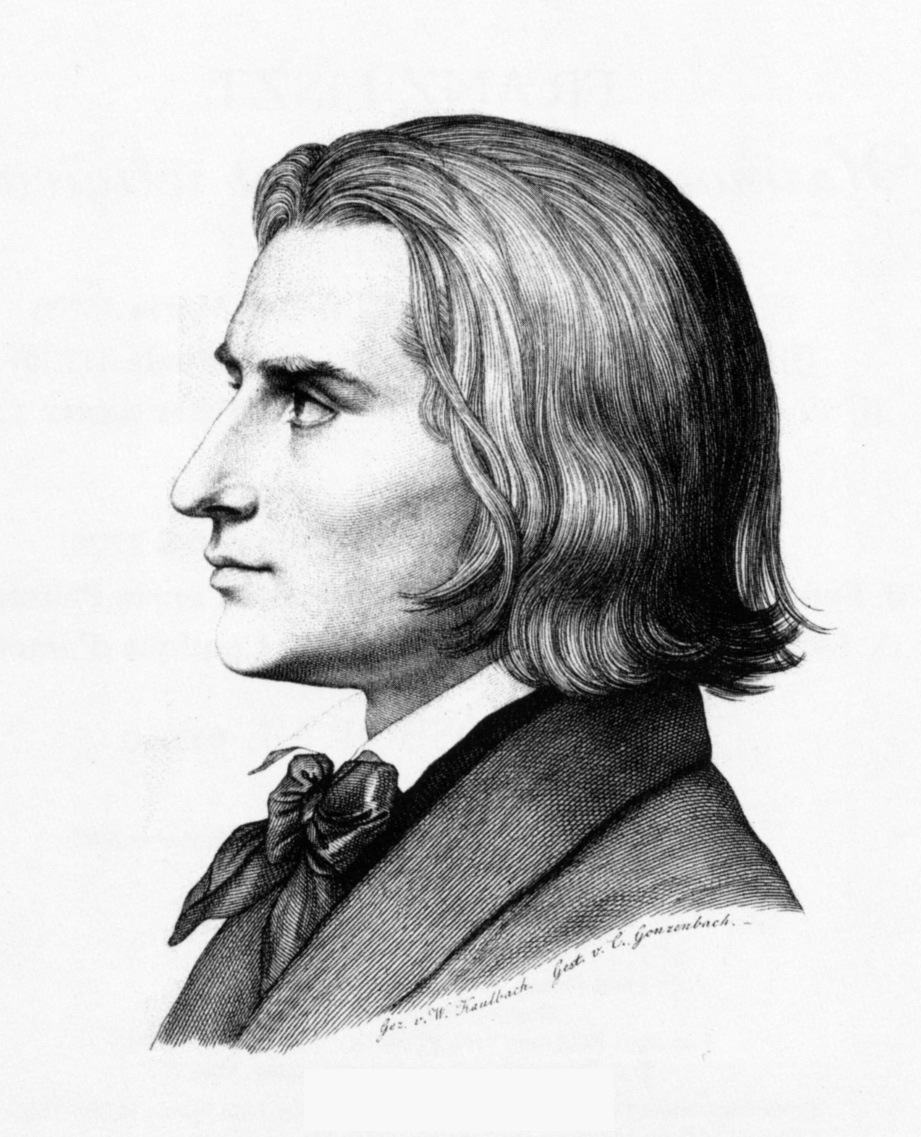
Liszt in 1843

Au bord d'une source ("Beside a Spring") is a piano piece by Franz Liszt; it is the 4th piece of the first suite of Années de Pèlerinage ("Years of Pilgrimage").

There are three separate versions of Au bord d'une source. The first version appears in Liszt's set Album d'un voyageur (1834–1838), and the second in the first suite of Liszt's Années de pèlerinage (1836–1855). The last version is almost identical to the second, except for the final nine bars, which were added by Liszt as a coda for his Italian piano student Giovanni Sgambati, who was also a composer; this lengthened the piece by about 30 seconds. The coda was written in 1863.

The second version of Au bord d'une source is often regarded as the most popular. In the first version the technical difficulties are considerably higher to the pianist, whilst the last version adds a flashy coda.

== Analysis ==
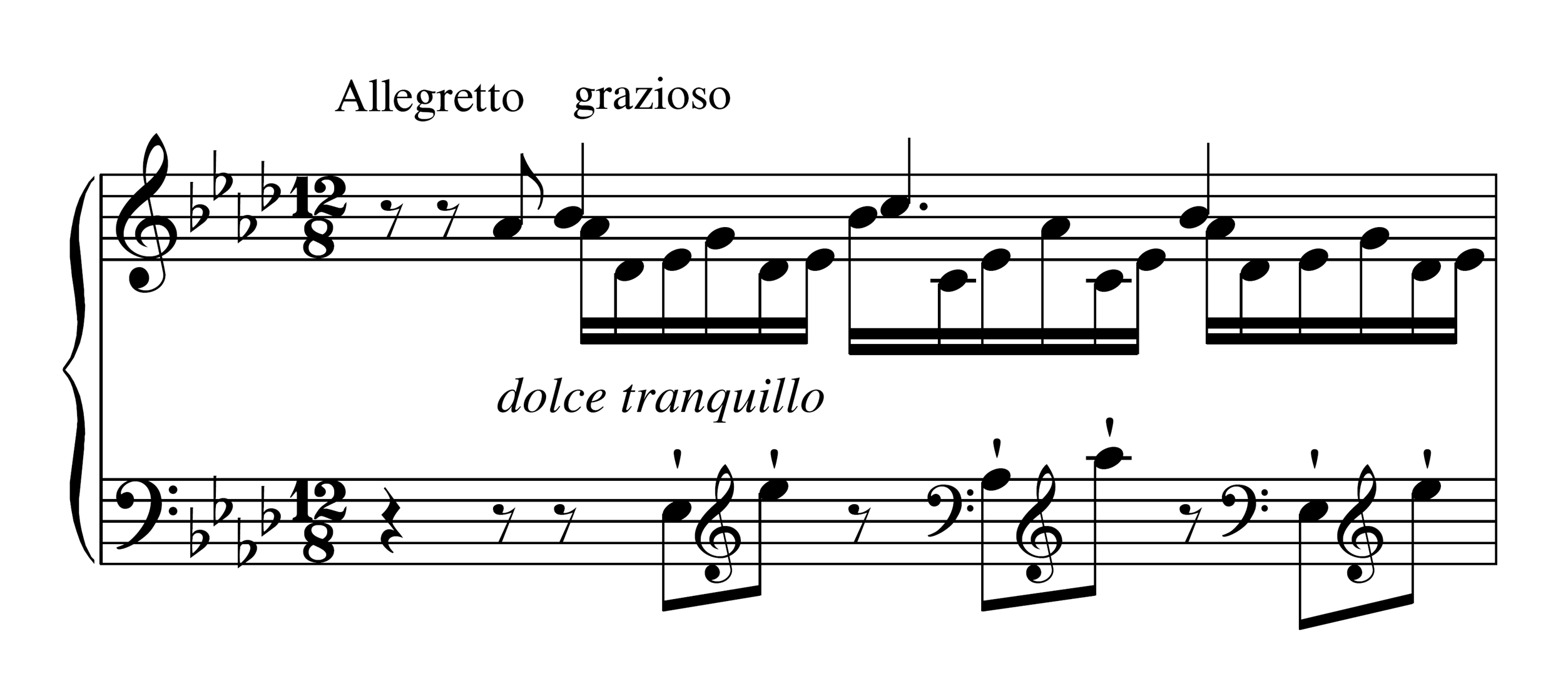
The first bar of Au bord d'une source

The main theme of Au bord d’une source comprises a pattern of arpeggiated semiquavers in the right hand with short notes in the left, firstly played below the right hand and then played two octaves higher, above the right hand. This constant crossing over of hands places considerable technical demands on the amateur pianist.

Liszt links the various sections of the piece together using passages of intricate scale and arpeggio patterns ascending high into the upper register, descending back down and transforming back into the melody; this allows the whole piece to flow as one.

The piece has many intricate difficulties that are belied by the calm mood with which a successful performance is often imbued.

== Recordings ==
The following pianists have recorded the piece, among others:

Au bord d'une source
Performed by Randolph Hokanson

Pianist	Duration	Record label	Recording Date	Album
Vladimir Horowitz	03:31	Philips Records	1947	Vladimir Horowitz II
Vladimir Horowitz	04:12	RCA Victor Red Seal	1975	Horowitz Rediscovered /Carnegie Hall Recital 1975
Wilhelm Kempff	04:03	Decca	1950s	Franz Liszt: Années de pelèrinage / Deux Légendes
Sviatoslav Richter	03:07	Parnassus	1958	Sviatoslav Richter in the 1950s, Vol. 3
Jorge Bolet	03:59	Philips Records	1983	Jorge Bolet II
Claudio Arrau	04:08	Pearl	1928	The Early Recordings
Eugen d'Albert	03:33	Pearl	1916	The Pupils of Liszt
Jenő Jandó	03:50	Naxos Records	1991	Liszt: Années de Pèlerinage I (Switzerland)
Leslie Howard	04:56	Hyperion Records	1996	Liszt: Deuxième Année de Pèlerinage - Italie/Venezia e Napoli
Tony MacAlpine	03:18	Shrapnel Records	1999	Master of Paradise
Lazar Berman	03:33	Deutsche Grammophon (DG)	1977	Liszt: Années de Pèlerinage
