= Étude in C-sharp minor, Op. 2, No. 1 (Scriabin) =

First composition by Alexander Scriabin

Etude Op. 2, No 1 in C♯ minor
Performed by Axel Lange

Étude in C♯ minor, Op. 2, No. 1, is an étude for piano, written by Russian composer Alexander Scriabin in 1887, when Scriabin was just 16 years old. It was the first of the Three Pieces, Op. 2, and was one of Scriabin's earliest successes.

== Analysis ==
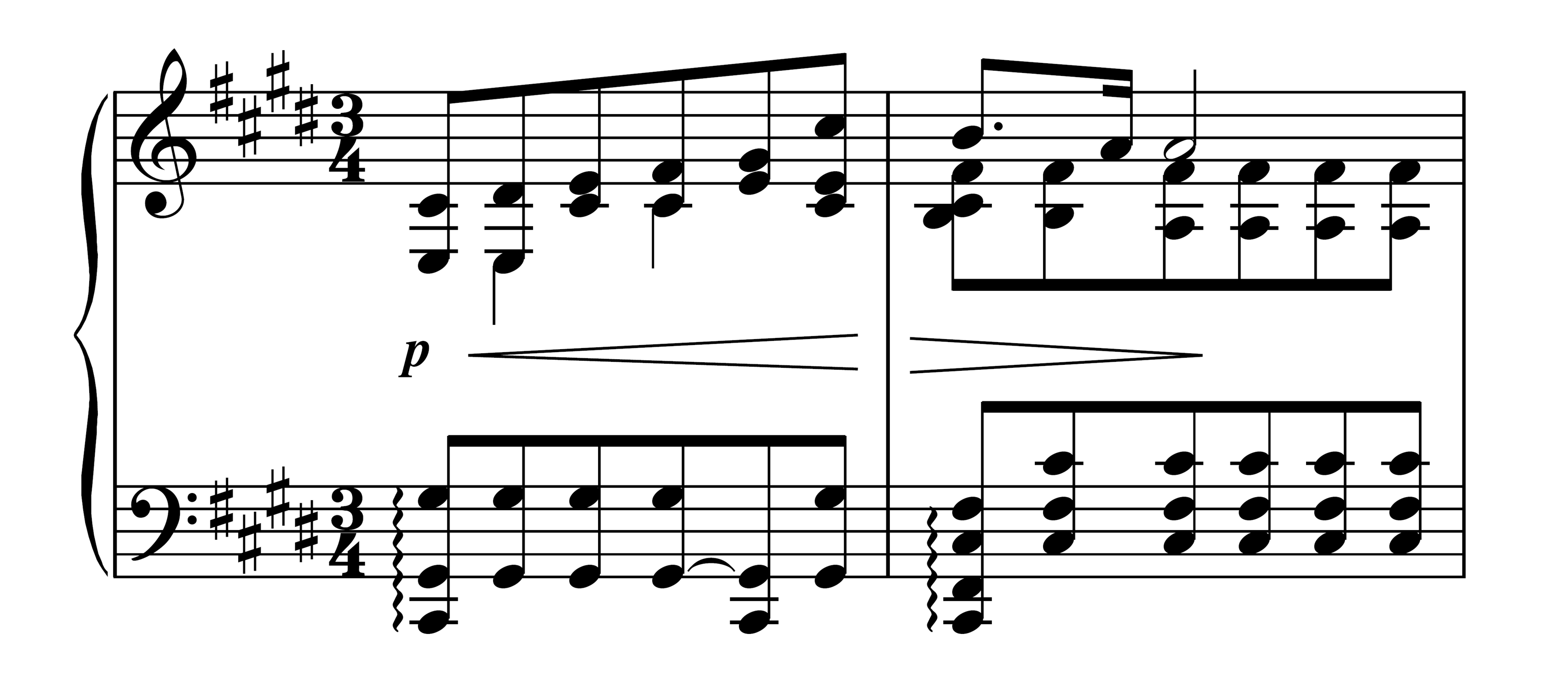
The first few bars of the étude

The étude is in 3/4 time in the key of C♯ minor. The melody is poignant and heartfelt, showing many characteristics of Russian Gypsy music. It is accompanied by repeated chords in both hands, featuring rich harmonies, inner voices, and large spreads in the left hand. The dynamics of the piece are varied constantly to display emotion and passion and to add interest. The piece features many key changes but finally concludes in the original key. Although it is a slow and somber piece, like many other études it is considerably difficult to perfect.

This étude lasts for about three minutes.

== Recordings ==
Pianist	Duration	Record label	Recording Date	Album
Vladimir Horowitz	02:39	Deutsche Grammophon	1986	Horowitz in Moscow
Shura Cherkassky	03:24	London Records	1982	Encores
Vladimir Horowitz	03:04	Sony Classics	mid 1960s?	Horowitz plays Scriabin
Sviatoslav Richter	02:51	Melodiya	1952	Richter
Burkard Schliessmann	03:20	Bayer Records	1990	Alexander Scriabin, Piano Works

== See also ==
- List of compositions by Alexander Scriabin
