= List of compositions by Frédéric Chopin by opus number =

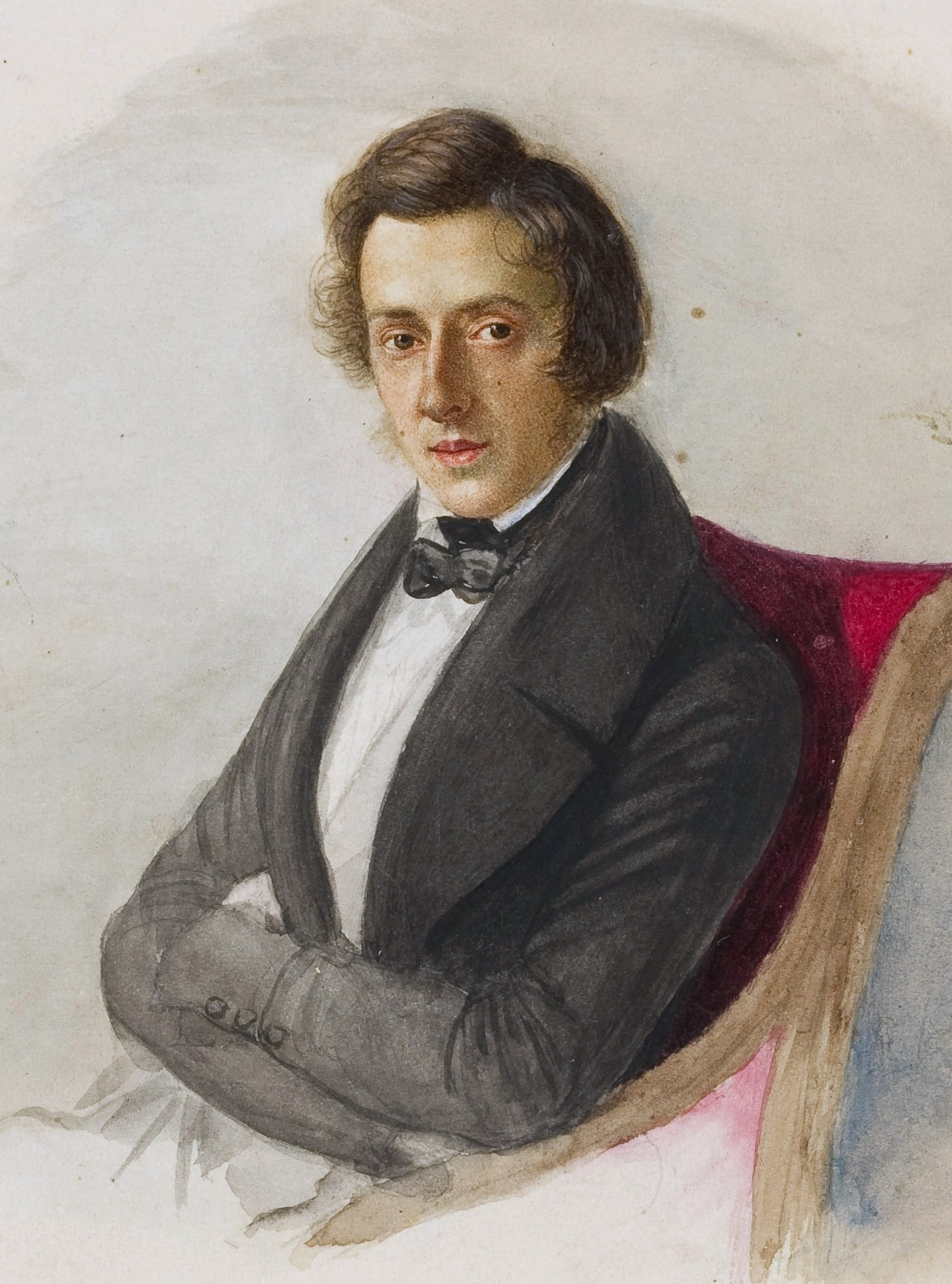
Chopin at 25, by Maria Wodzińska, 1835

Most of Frédéric Chopin's compositions were for solo piano, although he did compose two piano concertos (his concertos No. 1 and No. 2 are two of the romantic piano concerto repertoire's most often-performed pieces) as well as some other music for ensembles.

His larger-scale works—such as the piano sonatas nos. 2 and 3, the four scherzi, the four ballades, the Fantaisie in F minor, Op. 49, the Barcarolle in F♯ major, Op. 60, and the Polonaise-Fantaisie in A♭ major, Op. 61—have cemented a solid place within the piano repertoire, as well as shorter works like his polonaises, mazurkas, waltzes, impromptus, rondos, and nocturnes making up a substantial portion of recorded and performed music.

Two important collections are the Études, Op. 10 and 25 (which are a staple of that genre for pianists), and the 24 Preludes, Op. 28 (a cycle of short pieces paired in a major key/relative minor key pattern following the circle of fifths in clockwise steps). In addition, Chopin wrote numerous songs in the setting of Polish texts, along with chamber pieces including a piano trio and a cello sonata.

This listing uses the traditional opus numbers where they apply; other works are identified by numbers from the catalogues of Maurice J. E. Brown (B), Krystyna Kobylańska (KK), Józef Michał Chomiński (A, C, D, E, P, S), and the Chopin National Edition (WN, Dbop.).

The last opus number that Chopin himself used was 65—allocated to his Cello Sonata in G minor. He expressed a death-bed wish that all his unpublished manuscripts be destroyed. This included the early Piano Sonata No. 1; Chopin had dedicated it to his teacher Józef Elsner, and at one point intended to have it published, but nothing came of it and he later changed his mind. In 1851, Tobias Haslinger published it as Op. 4. Following Chopin's death in 1849, at the request of his mother and sisters, Julian Fontana selected 23 other as-yet-unpublished piano pieces and grouped them into eight opus numbers (Opp. 66–73). These works were published in 1855. In 1857, the known 17 Polish songs (not including three songs that have since come to light) that had been written at various stages throughout Chopin's life were collected and published as Op. 74 (with little regard for order of composition.) Works that were published or have come to light since 1857 were not given opus numbers, and alternate catalogue designations are used for them.

== Works with opus numbers ==
=== Published during Chopin's lifetime ===
- Op. 1, Rondo in C minor (1825)
- Op. 2, Variations on "Là ci darem la mano" from Mozart's opera Don Giovanni, in B♭ major, for piano and orchestra (1827)
- Op. 3, Introduction and Polonaise brillante in C major for cello and piano (1829)
- Op. 5, Rondo à la mazur in F major (1826)
- Op. 6, 4 Mazurkas (1830)
  1. Mazurka in F♯ minor
  2. Mazurka in C♯ minor
  3. Mazurka in E major
  4. Mazurka in E♭ minor
- Op. 7, 5 Mazurkas (1830–1831)
  1. Mazurka in B♭ major
  2. Mazurka in A minor (1829, revised 1830)
  3. Mazurka in F minor
  4. Mazurka in A♭ major (1824, revised 1830)
  5. Mazurka in C major
- Op. 8, Trio for Violin, Cello and Piano in G minor (1829)
- Op. 9, 3 Nocturnes (1830–32)
  1. Nocturne in B♭ minor
  2. Nocturne in E♭ major
  3. Nocturne in B major
- Op. 10, 12 Études (1829–1832)
  1. Étude in C major (1829–1830)
  2. Étude in A minor (1830)
  3. Étude in E major (1832)
  4. Étude in C♯ minor (1832)
  5. Étude in G♭ major (1830)
  6. Étude in E♭ minor (1830)
  7. Étude in C major (1832)
  8. Étude in F major (1829)
  9. Étude in F minor (1829)
  10. Étude in A♭ major (1829)
  11. Étude in E♭ major (1829)
  12. Étude in C minor (1831)
- Op. 11, Concerto for Piano and Orchestra No. 1 in E minor (1830)
- Op. 12, Variations brillantes on "Je vends des Scapulaires" from Hérold's Ludovic, in B♭ major (1833)
- Op. 13, Fantasy on Polish Airs in A major (1828–30)
- Op. 14, Rondo à la Krakowiak in F major (1828)
- Op. 15, 3 Nocturnes (1830–1833)
  1. Nocturne in F major
  2. Nocturne in F♯ major
  3. Nocturne in G minor
- Op. 16, Rondo in E♭ major (1832–33)
- Op. 17, 4 Mazurkas (1832–1833)
  1. Mazurka in B♭ major
  2. Mazurka in E minor
  3. Mazurka in A♭ major
  4. Mazurka in A minor
- Op. 18, Grande valse brillante in E♭ major (1831–33)
- Op. 19, Boléro in A minor (1833)
- Op. 20, Scherzo No. 1 in B minor (1831–33)
- Op. 21, Concerto for Piano and Orchestra No. 2 in F minor (1829–1830)
- Op. 22, Andante spianato et grande polonaise brillante in E♭ major (the polonaise section orchestrated 1830-31; arranged for piano solo with Andante spianato introduction 1834)
- Op. 23, Ballade No. 1 in G minor (1831–1835)
- Op. 24, 4 Mazurkas (1834–1835)
  1. Mazurka in G minor
  2. Mazurka in C major
  3. Mazurka in A♭ major
  4. Mazurka in B♭ minor
- Op. 25, 12 Études (1832–1836)
  1. Étude in A♭ major (1836)
  2. Étude in F minor (1836)
  3. Étude in F major (1836)
  4. Étude in A minor (1832–1834)
  5. Étude in E minor (1832–1834)
  6. Étude in G♯ minor (1832–1834)
  7. Étude in C♯ minor (1836)
  8. Étude in D♭ major (1832–1834)
  9. Étude in G♭ major (1832–1834)
  10. Étude in B minor (1832–1834)
  11. Étude in A minor (1834)
  12. Étude in C minor (1836)
- Op. 26, 2 Polonaises (1834–1836)
  1. Polonaise in C♯ minor
  2. Polonaise in E♭ minor
- Op. 27, 2 Nocturnes (1835–1836)
  1. Nocturne in C♯ minor
  2. Nocturne in D♭ major
- Op. 28, 24 Preludes (1836–1839)
  1. Prelude in C major (1839)
  2. Prelude in A minor (Nov 28 1838)
  3. Prelude in G major (1838–1839)
  4. Prelude in E minor (Nov 28 1838)
  5. Prelude in D major (1838–1839)
  6. Prelude in B minor (1838–1839)
  7. Prelude in A major (1836)
  8. Prelude in F♯ minor (1838–1839)
  9. Prelude in E major (1838–1839)
  10. Prelude in C♯ minor (1838–1839)
  11. Prelude in B major (1838–1839)
  12. Prelude in G♯ minor (1838–1839)
  13. Prelude in F♯ major (1838–1839)
  14. Prelude in E♭ minor (1838–1839)
  15. Prelude in D♭ major (1838–1839)
  16. Prelude in B♭ minor (1838–1839)
  17. Prelude in A♭ major (1836)
  18. Prelude in F minor (1838–1839)
  19. Prelude in E♭ major (1838–1839)
  20. Prelude in C minor (1838–1839)
  21. Prelude in B♭ major (1838–1839)
  22. Prelude in G minor (1838–1839)
  23. Prelude in F major (1838–1839)
  24. Prelude in D minor (1838–1839)
- Op. 29, Impromptu No. 1 in A♭ major (1837)
- Op. 30, 4 Mazurkas (1836–1837)
  1. Mazurka in C minor
  2. Mazurka in B minor
  3. Mazurka in D♭ major
  4. Mazurka in C♯ minor
- Op. 31, Scherzo No. 2 in B♭ minor (1837)
- Op. 32, 2 Nocturnes (1836–1837)
  1. Nocturne in B major
  2. Nocturne in A♭ major
- Op. 33, 4 Mazurkas (1837–1838)
  1. Mazurka in G♯ minor
  2. Mazurka in D major
  3. Mazurka in C major
  4. Mazurka in B minor
- Op. 34, 3 Waltzes (1831–1838)
  1. Waltz in A♭ major (1835)
  2. Waltz in A minor (1831)
  3. Waltz in F major (1838)
- Op. 35, Piano Sonata No. 2 in B♭ minor ("Funeral March") (1839)
- Op. 36, Impromptu No. 2 in F♯ major (1839)
- Op. 37, 2 Nocturnes (1838–1839)
  1. Nocturne in G minor
  2. Nocturne in G major
- Op. 38, Ballade No. 2 in F major (1836–1839)
- Op. 39, Scherzo No. 3 in C♯ minor (1839)
- Op. 40, 2 Polonaises (1838–1839)
  1. Polonaise in A major
  2. Polonaise in C minor
- Op. 41 4 Mazurkas (1838–1839)
  1. Mazurka in C♯ minor
  2. Mazurka in E minor
  3. Mazurka in B major
  4. Mazurka in A♭ major
- Op. 42, Waltz in A♭ major (1840)
- Op. 43, Tarantella in A♭ major (1841)
- Op. 44, Polonaise in F♯ minor (1841)
- Op. 45, Prelude in C♯ minor (1841)
- Op. 46, Allegro de concert in A major (1832–1841)
- Op. 47, Ballade No. 3 in A♭ major (1840–1841)
- Op. 48, 2 Nocturnes (1841)
  1. Nocturne in C minor
  2. Nocturne in F♯ minor
- Op. 49, Fantaisie in F minor (1841)
- Op. 50, 3 Mazurkas (1841–1842)
  1. Mazurka in G major
  2. Mazurka in A♭ major
  3. Mazurka in C♯ minor
- Op. 51, Impromptu No. 3 in G♭ major (1842)
- Op. 52, Ballade No. 4 in F minor (1842)
- Op. 53, Polonaise in A♭ major (1842)
- Op. 54, Scherzo No. 4 in E major (1842)
- Op. 55, 2 Nocturnes (1843)
  1. Nocturne in F minor
  2. Nocturne in E♭ major
- Op. 56, 3 Mazurkas (1843)
  1. Mazurka in B major
  2. Mazurka in C major
  3. Mazurka in C minor
- Op. 57, Berceuse in D♭ major (1843)
- Op. 58, Piano Sonata No. 3 in B minor (1844)
- Op. 59, 3 Mazurkas (1845)
  1. Mazurka in A minor
  2. Mazurka in A♭ major
  3. Mazurka in F♯ minor
- Op. 60, Barcarolle in F♯ major (1845–1846)
- Op. 61, Polonaise-Fantaisie in A♭ major (1845–1846)
- Op. 62, 2 Nocturnes (1846)
  1. Nocturne in B major
  2. Nocturne in E major
- Op. 63, 3 Mazurkas (1846)
  1. Mazurka in B major
  2. Mazurka in F minor
  3. Mazurka in C♯ minor
- Op. 64, 3 Waltzes (1846–1847)
  1. Waltz in D♭ major "Minute" (1847)
  2. Waltz in C♯ minor (1847)
  3. Waltz in A♭ major (1846–1847)
- Op. 65, Sonata for Cello and Piano in G minor (1845–1847)

=== Published posthumously ===
- Op. posth. 4, Piano Sonata No. 1 in C minor (1828)
- Op. posth. 66, Fantaisie-Impromptu in C♯ minor, WN 46 (1835)
- Op. posth. 67, 4 Mazurkas (1835–1849)
  1. Mazurka in G major, WN 26 (1835)
  2. Mazurka in G minor, WN 64 (1849)
  3. Mazurka in C major, WN 48 (1835)
  4. Mazurka in A minor, WN 60 (1846)
- Op. posth. 68, 4 Mazurkas (1827–1849)
  1. Mazurka in C major, WN 24 (1829)
  2. Mazurka in A minor, WN 14 (1827)
  3. Mazurka in F major, WN 25 (1829)
  4. Mazurka in F minor, WN 65 (1849; Last composition)
- Op. posth. 69, 2 Waltzes (1829–1835)
  1. Waltz in A♭ major, WN 47 (1835)
  2. Waltz in B minor, WN 19 (1829)
- Op. posth. 70, 3 Waltzes (1829–1841)
  1. Waltz in G♭ major, WN 42 (1832)
  2. Waltz in F minor, WN 55 (1841)
  3. Waltz in D♭ major, WN 20 (1829)
- Op. posth. 71, 3 Polonaises (1825–1828)
  1. Polonaise in D minor, WN 11 (1825)
  2. Polonaise in B♭ major, WN 17 (1828–29)
  3. Polonaise in F minor, WN 12 (1828)
- Op. posth. 72, (1826–1827)
  1. Nocturne in E minor, WN 23 (1827–30)
  2. Marche funèbre in C minor, WN 9 (1827; B. 20)
  3. Three Écossaises (1826, 30?; B. 12)
    1. Écossaise in D major, WN 13 No. 3
    2. Écossaise in G major, WN 13 No. 1
    3. Écossaise in D♭ major, WN 13 No. 2
- Op. posth. 73, Rondo in C major, WN 15 (versions for solo piano, WN deest., and two pianos) (1828)
- Op. posth. 74, 17 Polish Songs (1829–1847)
  1. "The Wish" ("Życzenie"), WN 21 (1829)
  2. "Spring" ("Wiosna"), WN 52 (1838)
  3. "The Sad River" ("Smutna Rzeka"), WN 39 (1831)
  4. "Merrymaking" ("Hulanka"), WN 32 (1830)
  5. "What She Likes" ("Gdzie lubi"), WN 22 (1829)
  6. "Out of My Sight" ("Precz z moich oczu"), WN 33 (1830)
  7. "The Messenger" ("Poseł"), WN 30 (1830)
  8. "Handsome Lad" ("Śliczny chłopiec"), WN 54 (1841)
  9. "From the Mountains, Where They Carried Heavy Crosses [Melody]" ("Z gór, gdzie dźwigali strasznych krzyżów brzemię [Melodia]"), WN 61 (1847)
  10. "The Warrior" ("Wojak"), WN 34 (1830)
  11. "The Double-End" ("Dwojaki koniec"), WN 58 (1845)
  12. "My Darling" ("Moja pieszczotka"), WN 51 (1837)
  13. "I Want What I Have Not" ("Nie ma czego trzeba"), WN 57 (1845)
  14. "The Ring" ("Pierścień"), WN 50 (1836)
  15. "The Bridegroom" ("Narzeczony"), WN 40 (1831)
  16. "Lithuanian Song" ("Piosnka litewska"), WN 38 (1831)
  17. "Leaves are Falling, Hymn from the Tomb" ("Śpiew z mogiłki"), WN 49 (1836)

== Works without opus numbers ==
Note: Because different catalogue numbering systems have applied to the following works, they are ordered by year of publication.

=== Published during Chopin's lifetime ===
- 1817: Polonaise in G minor, B. 1, KK IIa/1, S 1/1, WN 2 (written 1817)
- 1826: 2 Mazurkas (G major, B♭ major), B. 16, KK IIa/2-3, S 1/2, WN 8 and 7 (1826; original versions published 1875)
- 1833: Grand Duo concertant for Cello and Piano in E major (written jointly with Auguste Franchomme, B. 70, KK IIb/1, S 2/1, Dbop. 16 (1832)
- 1839: Variation No. 6 in E major from Hexameron, B. 113, KK IIb/2, S 2/2, Dbop. 29 (1837)
- 1840: Trois nouvelles études (F minor, A♭ major, D♭ major), B. 130, KK IIb/3, S 2/3, Dbop. 36 (1839)
- 1841: Mazurka in A minor, Émile Gaillard, B. 140, KK IIb/5, S 2/5, Dbop. 42 A (1840)
- 1841: Mazurka in A minor, Notre Temps, B. 134, KK IIb/4, S 2/4, Dbop. 42 B (1841)

=== Published posthumously/attributed to Chopin ===
- 1851: Variations in E major on the air "Der Schweizerbub", a.k.a. Introduction et Variations sur un lied allemand en mi majeur, B. 14, KK IVa/4, P 1/4, WN 6 (1826, 24?)
- 1861: Waltz in E major, B. 44, KK IVa/12, P 1/12, WN 18 (1829)
- 1864: Polonaise in G♯ minor, B. 6, KK IVa/3, P 1/3, WN 4 (1822, 24?)
- 1868: Waltz in E minor, B. 56, KK IVa/15, P 1/15, WN 29 (1830)
- 1869–70: Polonaise in G♭ major, B. 36, KK IVa/8, P 1/8, WN 35 (1829)
- 1870: Mazurka in C major, B. 82, KK IVb/3, P 2/3 (1833)
- 1875: Mazurka in D major (first version), B. 31, KK IVa/7, P 1/7 (1829)
- 1875: Nocturne in C♯ minor, Lento con gran espressione, B. 49 - referring to second version (MS lost), KK IVa/16 - referring to Chopin's first MS, P 1/16, WN 37 (1830)
- 1879: Song: "Which flowers" (Jakież kwiaty, jakie wianki) (Mazur) in G major, B. 39, KK IVa/9, P 1/9, WN 17a (1829)
- 1879–80: Polonaise in B♭ minor. Adieu à Guillaume Kolberg, B. 13, KK IVa/5, P 1/5, WN 10 (1826)
- 1880: Mazurka in D major (second version), B. 71, KK IVb/2, P 2/2 (1832)
- 1881: Variations in A major: « Souvenir de Paganini », B. 37, KK IVa/10, P 1/10, WN 16 (1829)
- 1898: Fugue in A minor, B. 144, KK IVc/2, P 3/2 (1841–1842)
- 1902: Polonaise in A♭ major, B. 5, KK IVa/2, P 1/2, WN 3 (1821)
- 1902: Waltz in A♭ major, B. 21, KK IVa/13, P 1/13, WN 28 (1827)
- 1902: Waltz in E♭ major, B. 46, KK IVa/14, P 1/14 (1827)
- 1909: Mazurka in B♭ major ("Wołowska"), B. 73, KK IVb/1, P 2/1, WN 41 (1832)
- 1910: Mazurka in D major (Mazurek), B. 4, KK Anh. Ia/1, A 1/1 (1820?; doubtful)
- 1910: Song: "Rêverie" (Dumka, Mist Before My Eyes), in A minor, B. 132, KK IVb/9, P 2/9 (1840)
- 1910: Moderato in E major « Feuille d'album » (Album Leaf), B. 151, KK IVb/12, P 2/12, WN 56 (1843)
- 1910: Polonaise in B♭ major, B. 3, KK IVa/1, P 1/1, WN 1 (1817)
- 1910: Song: "Enchantement" (Czary), in D minor, B. 51, KK IVa/11, P 1/11, WN 31 (1830)
- 1918: Prelude in A♭ major (ded. Pierre Wolff), B. 86, KK IVb/7, P 2/7, WN 44 (1834)
- 1925: Cantabile (Klavierstück) in B♭ major, B. 84, KK IVb/6, P 2/6, WN 43 (1834)
- 1930: Mazurka in A♭ major, B. 85, KK IVb/4, P 2/4, WN 45 (1834)
- 1930: Prelude and Andantino animato, in F major and D minor, KK Anh. Ia/2-3, A 1/2-3 (doubtful, fragments)
- 1932: ~~Waltz in F♯ minor, Valse mélancolique, KK Anh. Ib/7 (formally Anh. Ia/7), A 1/7~~ (Spurious attribution: the work is in fact by Charles Mayer, written about 1861 and originally titled "Le Regret, Op. 332")
- 1934: Contredanse in G♭ major, B. 17, KK Anh. Ia/4, A 1/4, WN 27 (1826–30; doubtful)
- 1938: Largo (Klavierstück) in E♭ major, B. 109, KK IVb/5, P 2/5 (1837, an arrangement of the song Boże, coś Polskę and not an independent composition by Chopin)
- 1938: Nocturne in C minor, B. 108, KK IVb/8, P 2/8, WN 62 (1837, 47–48?)
- 1948: Canon in F minor, B. 129b, KK IVc/1, P 3/1 (unfinished)
- 1955: Variations in E major for flute and piano on the air "Non più mesta" from Rossini's La Cenerentola, B. 9, KK Anh. Ia/5, A 1/5 (1829, while generally considered spurious, it is probably a collaborative work with Józef Cichocki)
- 1955: "Sostenuto" (a.k.a. Waltz; Klavierstück) in E♭ major, B. 133, KK IVb/10, P 2/10, WN 53 (1840)
- 1955: Waltz in A minor, B. 150, KK IVb/11, P 2/11, WN 63 (1843, 47–49?)
- 1965: Variations in D major for piano duet, a.k.a Introduction, thème et variations sur un air vénitien, or sur un thème de Thomas Moore, B. 12a, KK IVa/6, P 1/6, WN 5 (1826)
- 1968: Bourrée No. 1 in G major, B. 160b/1, KK VIIb/1, D 2/1 (1848)
- 1968: Bourrée No. 2 in A major, B. 160b/2, KK VIIb/2, D 2/2 (1846)
- 1968: Andantino in G minor, B. 117, WN 52a (1838–48; arrangement for piano of "Wiosna" from Polish songs, Op. 74, No. 2)
- ?: 3 Fugues (A minor, F major, D minor); arr. from Cherubini's Cours de contrepoint et de fugue, KK VIIa/2
- ?: Allegretto and Mazurka in A major and D minor, KK VIIb/7-8 (folk tunes)
- ?: Harmonization of the refrain from Mazurek Dąbrowskiego in B♭ major, KK Ve/4 (1835)
- ?: Nocturne in C♯ minor (Nocturne oublié), KK Anh. Ia/6, A 1/6 (spurious)
- 1990: Galopp in A♭ major (Galop Marquis), KK IVb/13, P 2/13, WN 59 (1846)
- 1990: Allegretto in F♯ major, KK Anh. II/1, WN 36 (1829?) (spurious, probably abridgment by Charles Mayer of his own Mazurka Op. 112)
- 2001: Prelude in E♭ minor, Devil's Trill (abandoned prelude no. 14 sketch realized by Jeffrey Kallberg)
- before 2010: Piano (and voice) transcription on Bellini's Casta Diva (solo piano arrangement possibly spurious), KK VIIa/1, D. 1/1
- 2024: Waltz in A minor

== See also ==
- List of compositions by Frédéric Chopin by genre
- Chopin National Edition
