= List of compositions by Frédéric Chopin by genre =

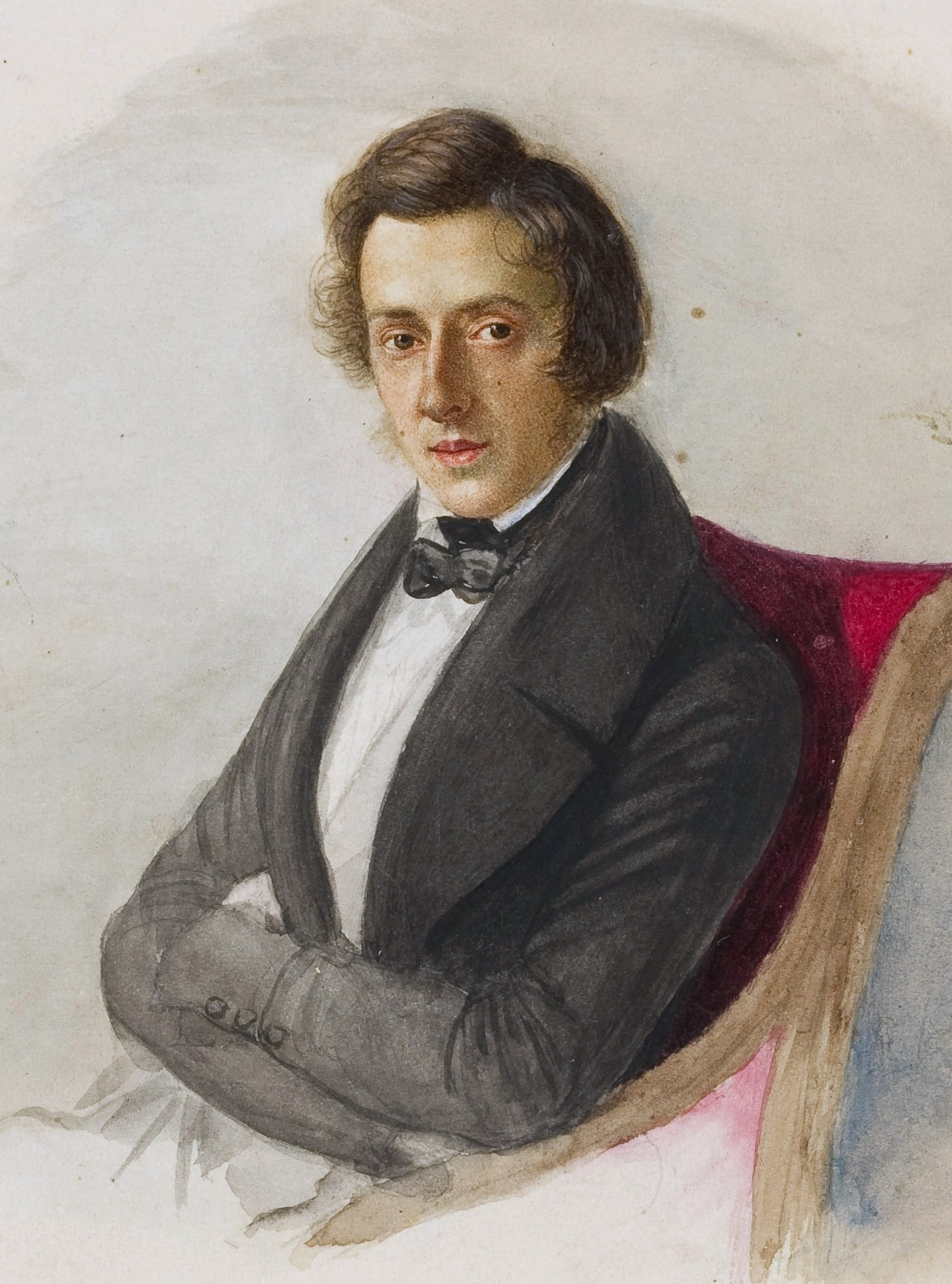
Chopin at 25, by Maria Wodzińska, 1835

Most of Frédéric Chopin's compositions were for solo piano, though he did compose several works for piano and orchestra (including two piano concertos) as well as some chamber works that include other instruments.

His larger scale works such as the piano sonatas nos. 2 and 3, the four scherzi, the four ballades, the Fantaisie in F minor, Op. 49, the Barcarolle in F♯ major, Op. 60, and the Polonaise-Fantaisie in A♭ major, Op. 61 have cemented a solid place within the piano repertoire, as have his shorter works: the polonaises, mazurkas, waltzes, impromptus, rondos, and nocturnes.

Two important collections are the Études, Op. 10 and 25 (which are a staple of that genre for pianists), and the 24 Preludes, Op. 28 (a cycle of short pieces paired in a major key/relative minor key pattern following the circle of fifths in clockwise steps). In addition, Chopin wrote numerous songs in the setting of Polish texts, along with chamber pieces including a piano trio and a cello sonata.

This listing uses the traditional opus numbers where they apply; other works are identified by numbers from the catalogues of Maurice J. E. Brown (B), Krystyna Kobylańska (KK), Józef Michał Chomiński (A, C, D, E, P, S), and Jan Ekier (WN, Dbop.).

== Piano solo ==
=== Ballades ===
- Op. 23: Ballade No. 1 in G minor (composed 1835–36)
- Op. 38: Ballade No. 2 in F major (1836–39)
- Op. 47: Ballade No. 3 in A♭ major (1841)
- Op. 52: Ballade No. 4 in F minor (1842–43)

=== Études ===
- Op. 10, 12 Études:
1. Étude in C major (1830)
2. Étude in A minor (1830)
3. Étude in E major (1832)
4. Étude in C♯ minor (1832)
5. Étude in G♭ major (1830)
6. Étude in E♭ minor (1830)
7. Étude in C major (1832)
8. Étude in F major (1829)
9. Étude in F minor (1829)
10. Étude in A♭ major (1829)
11. Étude in E♭ major (1829)
12. Étude in C minor (1831)
- Op. 25, 12 Études:
1. Étude in A♭ major (1836)
2. Étude in F minor (1836)
3. Étude in F major (1836)
4. Étude in A minor (1832–34)
5. Étude in E minor (1832–34)
6. Étude in G♯ minor (1832–34)
7. Étude in C♯ minor (1836)
8. Étude in D♭ major (1832–34)
9. Étude in G♭ major (1832–34)
10. Étude in B minor (1832–34)
11. Étude in A minor (1834)
12. Étude in C minor (1836)
- Trois nouvelles études (1839; B. 130; KK IIb/3; Dbop. 36A, B, C):
1. Étude in F minor
2. Étude in A♭ major
3. Étude in D♭ major

=== Impromptus ===
- Op. 29: Impromptu No. 1 in A♭ major (1837)
- Op. 36: Impromptu No. 2 in F♯ major (1839)
- Op. 51: Impromptu No. 3 in G♭ major (1843)

==== Posthumously published ====
- 1855: Op. (posth.) 66; WN 46: Fantaisie-Impromptu in C♯ minor (1834–35)

=== Mazurkas ===
- Op. 6, Four Mazurkas (1830–32, Nos. 1–4):
1. Mazurka in F♯ minor
2. Mazurka in C♯ minor
3. Mazurka in E major
4. Mazurka in E♭ minor
- Op. 7, Five Mazurkas (1830–32, Nos. 5–9):
1. Mazurka in B♭ major
2. Mazurka in A minor (1829, revised 1830)
3. Mazurka in F minor
4. Mazurka in A♭ major (1824, revised 1830)
5. Mazurka in C major
- Op. 17, Four Mazurkas (1833, Nos. 10-13):
1. Mazurka in B♭ major
2. Mazurka in E minor
3. Mazurka in A♭ major
4. Mazurka in A minor (1824, revised 1833)
- Op. 24, Four Mazurkas (1835, Nos. 14–17):
1. Mazurka in G minor
2. Mazurka in C major
3. Mazurka in A♭ major
4. Mazurka in B♭ minor
- Op. 30, Four Mazurkas (1837, Nos. 18–21):
1. Mazurka in C minor
2. Mazurka in B minor
3. Mazurka in D♭ major
4. Mazurka in C♯ minor
- Op. 33, Four Mazurkas (1838, Nos. 22–25):
1. Mazurka in G♯ minor
2. Mazurka in D major
3. Mazurka in C major
4. Mazurka in B minor
- Op. 41, Four Mazurkas (1839–40, Nos. 26–29):
1. Mazurka in C♯ minor
2. Mazurka in E minor
3. Mazurka in B major
4. Mazurka in A♭ major
- Op. 50, Three Mazurkas (1842, Nos. 30–32):
1. Mazurka in G major
2. Mazurka in A♭ major
3. Mazurka in C♯ minor
- Op. 56, Three Mazurkas (1844, Nos. 33–35):
1. Mazurka in B major
2. Mazurka in C major
3. Mazurka in C minor
- Op. 59, Three Mazurkas (1845–46, Nos. 36–38):
1. Mazurka in A minor
2. Mazurka in A♭ major
3. Mazurka in F♯ minor
- Op. 63, Three Mazurkas (1846–47, Nos. 39–41):
1. Mazurka in B major
2. Mazurka in F minor
3. Mazurka in C♯ minor

==== Published without opus numbers ====
- 1826: Two Mazurkas (unnumbered; B. 16; KK IIa/2-3; S. 1/2):
  - a. Mazurka in G major (WN 8)
  - b. Mazurka in B♭ major (WN 7)
- 1841: Mazurka in A minor (No. 50; Notre Temps; 1840; B. 134; KK IIb/4; S. 2/4; Dbop. 42B; in Six morceaux de salon)
- 1841: Mazurka in A minor (No. 51; À Émile Gaillard; 1840; B. 140; KK IIb/5; S. 2/5; Dbop. 42A; in Album de pianistes polonais)

==== Posthumously published ====
===== With opus numbers =====
- 1855: Op. posth. 67, Four Mazurkas (Nos. 42–45):
1. Mazurka in G major (1833; WN 26)
2. Mazurka in G minor (1849; WN 64)
3. Mazurka in C major (1835; WN 48)
4. Mazurka in A minor (1846; WN 60)
- 1855: Op. posth. 68, Four Mazurkas (Nos. 46–49):
1. Mazurka in C major (1829; WN 24)
2. Mazurka in A minor (1827; WN 14)
3. Mazurka in F major (1829; WN 25)
4. Mazurka in F minor (1849; WN 65; Last composition)

===== Without opus numbers =====
- 1870: Mazurka in C major (1833; B. 82; KK IVb/3; P. 2/3)
- 1875: Mazurka in D major (first version) (1829; B. 31; KK IVa/7; P. 1/7)
- 1880: Mazurka in D major (second version) (1832; B. 71; KK IVb/2; P. 2/2)
- 1909: Mazurka in B♭ major (1832; B. 73; KK IVb/1; P. 2/1; WN 41)
- 1910: Mazurka in D major "Mazurek" (doubtful; 1820?; B. 4; KK Anh. Ia/1; A. 1/1)
- 1930: Mazurka in A♭ major (1834; B. 85; KK IVb/4; P. 2/4; WN 45)

=== Nocturnes ===
- Op. 9, Three Nocturnes (1830–32):
1. Nocturne in B♭ minor
2. Nocturne in E♭ major
3. Nocturne in B major
- Op. 15, Three Nocturnes (1830–33):
1. Nocturne in F major
2. Nocturne in F♯ major
3. Nocturne in G minor
- Op. 27, Two Nocturnes (1835–36):
1. Nocturne in C♯ minor
2. Nocturne in D♭ major
- Op. 32, Two Nocturnes (1836–37):
1. Nocturne in B major
2. Nocturne in A♭ major
- Op. 37, Two Nocturnes (1838–40):
1. Nocturne in G minor
2. Nocturne in G major
- Op. 48, Two Nocturnes (1840–41):
1. Nocturne in C minor
2. Nocturne in F♯ minor
- Op. 55, Two Nocturnes (1843–44):
1. Nocturne in F minor
2. Nocturne in E♭ major
- Op. 62, Two Nocturnes (1846):
1. Nocturne in B major
2. Nocturne in E major

==== Posthumously published ====
===== With opus numbers =====
- 1855: Op. posth. 72 (Nos. 2 and 3 are works other than Nocturnes); WN 23:
1. Nocturne in E minor (1827–29)

===== Without opus numbers =====
- 1875: Nocturne in C♯ minor, Lento con gran espressione (1830; B. 49 – revised version, MS now lost; KK IVa/16 – first version based on Chopin's MS; P. 1/16; WN 37)
- 1938: Nocturne in C minor (1837, 47–48?; B. 108; KK IVb/8; P. 2/8; WN 62)
- Nocturne in C♯ minor (Nocturne oublié) (spurious; KK Anh. Ia/6; A. 1/6)

=== Polonaises ===
- Op. 26, Two Polonaises (1833–36):
1. Polonaise in C♯ minor
2. Polonaise in E♭ minor
- Op. 40, Two Polonaises (1838–40):
1. Polonaise in A major
2. Polonaise in C minor
- Op. 44: Polonaise in F♯ minor (1840–41)
- Op. 53: Polonaise in A♭ major (1842–43)
- Op. 61: Polonaise-Fantaisie in A♭ major (1846)

==== Published by Nicolas Chopin without opus number ====
- 1817: Polonaise in G minor (B. 1; KK IIa/1; WN 2; First composition)

==== Posthumously published ====
===== With opus numbers =====
- 1855: Op. posth. 71, Three Polonaises:
1. Polonaise in D minor (1825; WN 11)
2. Polonaise in B♭ major (1828; WN 17)
3. Polonaise in F minor (1828; WN 12)

===== Without opus numbers =====
- 1864: Polonaise in G♯ minor (1822; KK IVa/3; WN 4)
- 1870: Polonaise in G♭ major (1829; KK IVa/8; WN 35)
- 1879: Polonaise in B♭ minor, Adieu à Guillaume Kolberg (1826; KK IVa/5; WN 10)
- 1902: Polonaise in A♭ major (1821; KK IVa/2; WN 3)
- 1910: Polonaise in B♭ major (1817; KK IVa/1; WN 1)

=== Préludes ===
- Op. 28, 24 Préludes:
1. Prélude in C major (composed 1839)
2. Prélude in A minor (1838)
3. Prélude in G major (1838–39)
4. Prélude in E minor (1838)
5. Prélude in D major (1838–39)
6. Prélude in B minor (1838–39)
7. Prélude in A major (1836)
8. Prélude in F♯ minor (1838–39)
9. Prélude in E major (1838–39)
10. Prélude in C♯ minor (1838–39)
11. Prélude in B major (1838–39)
12. Prélude in G♯ minor (1838–39)
13. Prélude in F♯ major (1838–39)
14. Prélude in E♭ minor (1838–39)
15. Prélude in D♭ major, Raindrop Prelude (1838–39)
16. Prélude in B♭ minor (1838–39)
17. Prélude in A♭ major, Clock Prelude (1836)
18. Prélude in F minor (1838–39)
19. Prélude in E♭ major (1838–39)
20. Prélude in C minor (1838–39)
21. Prélude in B♭ major (1838–39)
22. Prélude in G minor (1838–39)
23. Prélude in F major (1838–39)
24. Prélude in D minor (1838–39)
- Op. 45: Prélude (no. 25) in C♯ minor (1841)

==== Posthumously published ====
- 1918: Presto con leggierezza "Prélude no. 26 in A♭ major" (1834, ded. Pierre Wolff; B. 86; KK IVb/7; P. 2/7; WN 44)
- 2001: Prélude in E♭ minor "The Devil's Trill" (1838–39; sketch realized by Jeffrey Kallberg)

=== Rondos ===
- Op. 1: Rondo in C minor (1825; arr. piano 4-hands 1834)
- Op. 5: Rondo à la mazur in F major (1826)
- Op. 16: Rondo in E♭ major (1833)

==== Posthumously published ====
- 1855: Op. posth. 73; WN 15: Rondo in C major for 2 pianos (1828; arr. piano solo 1840)

=== Scherzos ===
- Op. 20: Scherzo No. 1 in B minor (1831–35)
- Op. 31: Scherzo No. 2 in B♭ minor (1836–37)
- Op. 39: Scherzo No. 3 in C♯ minor (1839–40)
- Op. 54: Scherzo No. 4 in E major (1842–43)

=== Sonatas ===
- Op. 35: Piano Sonata No. 2 in B♭ minor, Funeral March (1839–40, third movement composed 1837)
- Op. 58: Piano Sonata No. 3 in B minor (1844–45)

==== Posthumously published ====
- 1851: Op. (posth.) 4: Piano Sonata No. 1 in C minor (1828)

=== Variations ===
(Other variations listed elsewhere include the Op. 2 Variations on "Là ci darem la mano" for piano and orchestra and the Berceuse in D♭ major, Op. 57)

- Op. 12: Variations brillantes in B♭ major on "Je vends des scapulaires" from Hérold's Ludovic (1833)
- Variation in E major for Hexameron (variation no. 6; 1837; pub. 1839; B. 113; KK IIb/2; Dbop. 29A)

==== Posthumously published ====
- 1851: Variations in E major on the air "Der Schweizerbub: Steh'auf, steh'auf o du Schweitzer Bub", a.k.a. Introduction et Variations sur un Lied allemand (1826; B. 14; KK IVa/4; WN 6)
- 1881: Variations in A major, Souvenir de Paganini (1829; B. 37; KK IVa/10; WN 16)
- 1965: Variations in D major on an Irish National Air (from Thomas Moore) 4-hands (or two pianos) (1826; B. 12a; KK IVa/6; P. 1/6; WN 5; various editions/transcriptions exist, including reconstructions of lost parts, most notably by Jan Ekier)

=== Waltzes ===
- Op. 18: Grande valse brillante in E♭ major (1833)
- Op. 34, Trois grandes valses brillantes:
1. Waltz in A♭ major (1835)
2. Waltz in A minor (1831)
3. Waltz in F major, Cat Waltz (1838)
- Op. 42: Waltz in A♭ major (1840)
- Op. 64, Three Waltzes:
1. Waltz in D♭ major, Minute Waltz (1847)
2. Waltz in C♯ minor (1847)
3. Waltz in A♭ major (1840, some sources say 1847)

==== Posthumously published ====
===== With opus numbers =====
- 1855: Op. posth. 69, Two Waltzes:
1. Waltz in A♭ major, L'Adieu (1835; WN 47)
2. Waltz in B minor (1829; WN 19)
- 1855: Op. posth. 70, Three Waltzes:
1. Waltz in G♭ major (1832; WN 42)
2. Waltz in F minor (1841; WN 55)
3. Waltz in D♭ major (1829; WN 20)

===== Without opus numbers =====
- 1868: Waltz in E minor (1830; B. 56; KK IVa/15; P. 1/15; WN 29)
- 1871–72: Waltz in E major (c. 1830; B. 44; KK IVa/12; P. 1/12; WN 18)
- 1902: Waltz in A♭ major (1827; B. 21; KK IVa/13; P. 1/13; WN 28)
- 1902: Waltz in E♭ major (1827; B. 46; KK IVa/14; P. 1/14; [not in WN])
- 1955: Waltz in E♭ major (1840; B. 133; KK IVb/10; P. 2/10; WN 53; Sostenuto, not always classified as a waltz)
- 1955: Waltz in A minor (1843, 48–49?; B. 150; KK IVb/11; P. 2/11; WN 63)
- 1932: ~~Waltz in F♯ minor, Valse mélancolique (1838?; KK Anh. Ib/7; A. 1/7)~~ Reattributed to Charles Mayer as Le Regret, Op. 332

==== Posthumously rediscovered ====
- 2024: Waltz in A minor (1830–35; published by Henle in 2025)

=== Miscellaneous pieces for solo piano ===
- Op. 19: Boléro in A minor (1833)
- Op. 22: Andante spianato in G major (1831–34; A solo piano introduction to the Grande polonaise brillante)
- Op. 43: Tarantelle in A♭ major (1841)
- Op. 46: Allegro de Concert in A major (1832–41)
- Op. 49: Fantaisie in F minor (1841)
- Op. 57: Berceuse in D♭ major (1844)
- Op. 60: Barcarolle in F♯ major (1845–46)

==== Posthumously published ====
===== With opus numbers =====
- 1855: Op. posth. 72:
1. (Nocturne in E minor (1827; WN 23))
2. Marche funèbre in C minor (1827; B. 20; WN 9)
3. Three Écossaises (1826; B. 12; WN 13):
  1. Écossaise in D major
  2. Écossaise in G major
  3. Écossaise in D♭ major

===== Without opus numbers =====
- Album Leaf (Moderato) in E major (1843; B. 151; KK IVb/12; WN 56)
- Allegretto and Mazurka in A major and D minor (KK VIIb/7-8; folk tunes)
- Allegretto in F♯ major (KK Anh. II/1; WN 36; long version spurious by Charles Mayer; reconstructed abridgement by Jan Ekier)
- Andantino in G minor (1837; B. 117; WN 52a; arr. for solo piano of the song Wiosna)
- 2 Bourrées in G and A major (1846–48; B. 160b; KK VIIb/1-2)
- Canon in F minor (1839, unfinished; B. 129b; KK IVc/1; P. 3/1)
- Cantabile (Klavierstück) in B♭ major (1834; B. 84; KK IVb/6; P. 2/6; WN 43)
- Casta Diva piano (and voice) transcription (on a work by Bellini) (KK VIIa/1; solo piano arrangement possibly spurious)
- Contredanse in G♭ major (doubtful; 1827; B. 17; KK Anh. Ia/4; WN 27)
- Fugue in A minor (1841; B. 144; KK IVc/2; P. 3/2)
- 3 Fugues (A minor, F major, D minor; KK VIIa/2; arr. from Cherubini's Cours de contrepoint et de fugue)
- Galopp in A♭ major, Galop Marquis (1846; KK IVb/13; P. 2/13; WN 59)
- Largo (Klavierstück) in E♭ major (1837; B. 109; KK IVb/5; P. 2/5; arr. from Boże, coś Polskę, 1816 ver.)
- Mazurek Dąbrowskiego Harmonization in B♭ major (1835, refrain only; KK Ve/4)
- Prelude and Andantino animato in F major and D minor (doubtful, fragments; KK Anh. Ia/2-3; A. 1/2-3)
- (Sostenuto (Klavierstück) in E♭ major (1840; B. 133; KK IVb/10; P. 2/10; WN 53; usually classified as a waltz))

== Piano and orchestra ==
=== Concerto ===
- Op. 11: Piano Concerto No. 1 in E minor (1830)
- Op. 21: Piano Concerto No. 2 in F minor (1829–30)

=== Miscellaneous ===
- Op. 2: Variations on "Là ci darem la mano" from Mozart's Don Giovanni, in B♭ major (1827)
- Op. 13: Fantasy on Polish Airs, in A major (1828)
- Op. 14: Rondo à la Krakowiak, in F major (1828)
- Op. 22: Grande polonaise brillante, in E♭ major (1830–31)

== Chamber music ==
=== Flute and piano (posthumously published) ===
- 1955: Variations in E major on "Non più mesta" from Rossini's La Cenerentola (1829?; B. 9; KK Anh. Ia/5; while generally considered spurious, it is probably a collaborative work with Józef Cichocki)

=== Cello and piano ===
- Op. 3: Introduction and Polonaise brillante in C major (1829–30)
- Grand Duo concertant in E major on themes of Meyerbeer's Robert le diable (1832; B. 70; KK IIb/1; Dbop. 16; written jointly with Auguste Franchomme)
- Op. 65: Cello Sonata in G minor (1845–46)

=== Violin, cello and piano ===
- Op. 8: Trio for Violin, Cello and Piano in G minor (1829)

== Voice and piano ==
=== Posthumously published ===
==== With opus numbers ====
- 1857: Op. posth. 74, 17 Songs (1829–47; Polish):
1. "The Wish" ("Życzenie") (1829; WN 21)
2. "Spring" ("Wiosna") (1838; WN 52)
3. "The Sad River" ("Smutna rzeka") (1831; WN 39)
4. "Merrymaking" ("Hulanka") (1830; WN 32)
5. "What She Likes" ("Gdzie lubi") (1829; WN 22)
6. "Out of My Sight!" ("Precz z moich oczu!") (1830; WN 33)
7. "The Messenger" ("Poseł") (1830; WN 30)
8. "Handsome Lad" ("Śliczny chłopiec") (1841; WN 54)
9. "From the Mountains, Where They Carried Heavy Crosses [Melody]" ("Z gór, gdzie dźwigali strasznych krzyżów brzemię [Melodia]") (1847; WN 61)
10. "The Warrior" ("Wojak") (1830; WN 34)
11. "The Double-End" ("Dwojaki koniec") (1845; WN 58)
12. "My Darling" ("Moja pieszczotka") (1837; WN 51)
13. "I Want What I Have Not" ("Nie ma czego trzeba") (1845; WN 57)
14. "The Ring" ("Pierścień") (1836; WN 50)
15. "The Bridegroom" ("Narzeczony") (1831; WN 40)
16. "Lithuanian Song" ("Piosnka litewska") (1831; WN 38)
17. "Leaves are Falling, Hymn from the Tomb" ("Śpiew z mogiłki") (1836; WN 49)

(Życzenie and Wojak were in fact published during Chopin's lifetime in Kyiv without opus number.)

==== Without opus numbers ====
- 1856: "Which flowers" ("Jakież kwiaty, jakie wianki") (1829; B. 39; KK IVa/9; WN 17a; only voice part exists)
- 1910: "Enchantment" ("Czary") (1830; B. 51; KK IVa/11; WN 31)
- 1910: "Reverie" ("Dumka") (1840; B. 132; KK IVb/9)

== Known lost works ==
- 2 works for aeolopantaleon, KK Ve/1-2. Notes and research on these pieces are found among others in "Jeszcze raz o dwóch nieznanych kompozycjach Chopina na eolipantalion" by Benjamin Vogel (1985)
- Écossaise for piano in E♭ major, KK Ve/3. Was in the hands of Oskar Kolberg
- Mazurka, KK Ve/6, dedicated to Mme. Nicolai
- Military March for orchestra, KK Vd/4, composed in 1817. Known from letters between Fontana and Sterlings
- 2 Polonaises for piano, composed 1818. Presented by Chopin to the Empress Maria Feodorowna, mother of Tsar Alexander I of Russia, on the occasion of her visit to Warsaw on 26 September 1818
- Polonaise for piano quoting The Barber of Seville, KK Vf, composed November 1825, when Chopin wrote to Bialoblocki: "I have done a new Polonaise on the 'Barber' which is fairly well liked. I think of sending it to be lithographed tomorrow."
- 2 sacred works, KK Va/1-2. Includes Veni Creator
- Sonata for four hands, KK Vc/5, composed by 1835. Mentioned in a letter from Chopin to Breitkopf
- Song 'Płótno', KK Vd/5. Mentioned in a correspondence between Fontana and Ludwika 2 July 1852
- Variations for piano, KK Ve/9, composed January 1818. Mentioned in the "Pamiętnik Warszawski" of 1818
- At least 2 pages from Variations on an Irish National Air (from Thomas Moore) for 2 pianos, KK IVa/6, composed 1826: the first page for secondary pianist and last page for principal pianist were lost
- Variations on a Ukrainian Dumka for violin and piano, KK VIIa/3, by Antoni Radziwiłł, completed by Chopin (by June 1830)
- Waltz in A minor, KK Vf, composed 1824. It was reported to be in Izabela Grabowska's lost album: "A delicious waltz dedicated to Countess Lubienska" (source: Aleksander Koptiajew)
- Several works for violin and piano, many of which were found in Izabela Grabowska's lost album

Piano works compiled by Ludwika Jędrzejewicz, now lost (only first lines are extant):

- Andante dolente in B♭ minor, KK Vb/1 (composed 1827)
- Variations for 4-hands or 2 pianos in F major, KK Vb/2 (1826)
- Waltz in C major, KK Vb/3 (1826)
- Waltz in A♭ major, KK Vb/4 (1827)
- Waltz in A♭ major, KK Vb/5 (1829–30)
- Waltz in D minor, KK Vb/6, catalogued as 'La partenza' ('The departure') (1828)
- Waltz in E♭ major, KK Vb/7 (1829–30)
- Waltz in C major, KK Vb/8 (1824, 1831?)
- Écossaise in B♭ major, KK Vb/9 (1827)

== See also ==
- List of compositions by Frédéric Chopin by opus number
- Chopin National Edition
