= Ingrid Fliter =

Argentinian classical pianist

- Born: 23 September 1973 (age 51)
- Origin: Buenos Aires, Argentina
- Genres: Classical
- Occupation: Musician
- Instrument: Piano
- Years active: 1984–present
- Website: www.ingridfliter.com

Íngrid Fliter (born September 23, 1973, Buenos Aires) is an Argentinian pianist. She began her piano studies with Lolita Lechner and Elizabeth Westerkamp. Her first public appearance in recital was at age 11, and she made her concerto debut at the Teatro Colón at age 16.

== Music career ==
In 1992, on the advice of Martha Argerich, Fliter moved to Europe, and continued her studies with Vitalj Margulis at the Hochschule für Musik, Freiburg. She later was a student with Carlo Bruno in Rome, and with Franco Scala and Boris Petrushansky at the Academy "Incontri col Maestro", Imola. She has participated in masterclasses with Leon Fleisher, Alexander Lonquich and Louis Lortie. She also counts Zoltán Kocsis as a mentor.

Fliter won several competitions in her native Argentina and in Europe, first prize winner at the Cantu International Competition and fourth prize winner at the Ferruccio Busoni Competition in Italy. In 2000, she was awarded the silver medal at the XIV International Chopin Piano Competition in Warsaw. Fliter was the fifth recipient of the 2006 Gilmore Artist Award and the first woman to win this award. She was a New Generation Artist for BBC Radio 3 for the period 2007–2009.

Fliter made her United States debut as the featured soloist on a tour with the Warsaw Philharmonic and Kazimierz Kord in January–February 2002. Her first concerto appearance with a US orchestra was with the Atlanta Symphony Orchestra in January 2006.

== Personal life ==
Fliter lives in Lake Como, Italy with her husband, clarinetist Anton Dressler, and their daughter.

== Discography ==
Year of issue	Album details	Recording date(s)	Record label
2007	Ingrid Fliter plays Beethoven & Chopin: Beethoven: Piano Sonata No. 7 in D major, Op. 10, No. 3: 1. Presto / 2. Largo e mesto / 3. Menuetto (Allegro) / 4. Rondo (Allegro); Beethoven: Piano Sonata No. 18 in E flat major (The Hunt), Op. 31, No. 3: 1. Allegro / 2. Scherzo (Allegro vivace) / 3. Menuetto (Moderato e grazioso) / 4. Presto con fuoco; Chopin: Waltzes, Op. 64: No. 1 in D-flat major ("Minute Waltz") / No. 2 in C-sharp minor / No. 3 in A-flat major; Chopin: Waltz in A-flat major, Op. 34 No. 1; Chopin: Waltz in F major, Op. 34 No. 3; Chopin: Waltz in A-flat major, Op. 42; Chopin: Andante spianato et grande polonaise brillante in E-flat major for piano and orchestra, Op. 22	February 14, 2005	VAI
2008	Ingrid Fliter ~ Chopin: Piano Sonata No. 3; Ballade No. 4; Barcarolle; Mazurkas; Impromptu; Waltzes: Piano Sonata No. 3 in B minor, Op. 58; Mazurkas, Op. 59: No. 1 in A minor / No. 2 in A-flat major / No. 3 in F-sharp minor; Barcarole in F Sharp major, Op. 60; Grande valse brillante in E-flat major, Op. 18; Waltzes, Op. 64: No. 1 in D-flat major ("Minute Waltz") / No. 2 in C-sharp minor / No. 3 in A-flat major; Ballade No. 4 in F minor, Op. 52	May 16 and October 18–20, 2007	EMI Classics
2009	Ingrid Fliter ~ Chopin: Complete Waltzes: Grande valse brillante in E-flat major, Op. 18; Trois grandes valses brillantes, Op. 34: No. 1 in A-flat major / No. 2 in A minor / No. 3 in F major; Waltz in A-flat major, Op. 42; Waltzes, Op. 64: No. 1 in D-flat major ("Minute Waltz") / No. 2 in C-sharp minor / No. 3 in A-flat major; Waltzes, Op. posth. 69: No. 1 in A-flat major, L'Adieu / No. 2 in B minor; Waltzes, Op. posth. 70: No. 1 in G-flat major / No. 2 in F minor / No. 3 in D-flat major; Waltz in A-flat major; Waltz in E major; Waltz in E minor; Waltz in E-flat major; Waltz Op. posth. in E-flat major (Sostenuto); Waltz Op. posth. in A minor; Waltz Op. posth. in F-sharp minor (Valse mélancolique)	May 11–14, 2009	EMI Classics
2011	Ingrid Fliter ~ Beethoven: Piano Sonatas Nos. 8, 17, 23: Piano Sonata No. 8 in C minor, Op. 13 (Sonata Pathétique); Piano Sonata No. 17 in D minor, Op. 31, No. 2 (Tempest); Piano Sonata No. 23 in F minor, Op. 57 (Appassionata)	Between late December 2010 and mid–January 2011	EMI Classics
2014	Ingrid Fliter / Jun Märkl / Scottish Chamber Orchestra ~ Frédéric Chopin: Piano Concertos: Piano Concerto No. 1 in E minor, Op. 11; Piano Concerto No. 2 in F minor, Op. 21	June 7–9, 2013	Linn Records
2014	Ingrid Fliter ~ Frédéric Chopin: Preludes: 24 Preludes, Op. 28: No. 1 in C major (Agitato) / No. 2 in A minor (Lento) / No. 3 in G major (Vivace) / No. 4 in E minor (Largo) / No. 5 in D major (Molto allegro) / No. 6 in B minor (Lento assai) / No. 7 in A major (Andantino) / No. 8 in F-sharp minor (Molto agitato) / No. 9 in E major (Largo) / No. 10 in C-sharp minor (Molto allegro) / No. 11 in B major (Vivace) / No. 12 in G-sharp minor (Presto) / No. 13 in F-sharp major (Lento) / No. 14 in E-flat minor (Allegro) / No. 15 in D-flat major, Raindrop (Sostenuto) / No. 16 in B-flat minor (Presto con fuoco) / No. 17 in A-flat major (Allegretto) / No. 18 in F minor (Molto allegro) / No. 19 in E-flat major (Vivace) / No. 20 in C minor, Chord or Funeral March (Largo) / No. 21 in B-flat major (Cantabile) / No. 22 in G minor (Molto agitato) / No. 23 in F major (Moderato) / No. 24 in D minor (Allegro appassionato); Mazurka in A minor, Op. 17, No. 4; Mazurka in E minor, Op. 17, No. 2; Mazurka in C-sharp minor, Op. 63, No. 3; Mazurka in C-sharp minor, Op. 50, No. 3; Mazurka in F-sharp minor, Op. 6, No. 1; Nocturne in B major, Op. 9, No. 3; Nocturne in D-flat major, Op. 27, No. 2	June 9–12, 2014	Linn Records
