= Waltzes (Chopin) =

Waltzes composed by Chopin

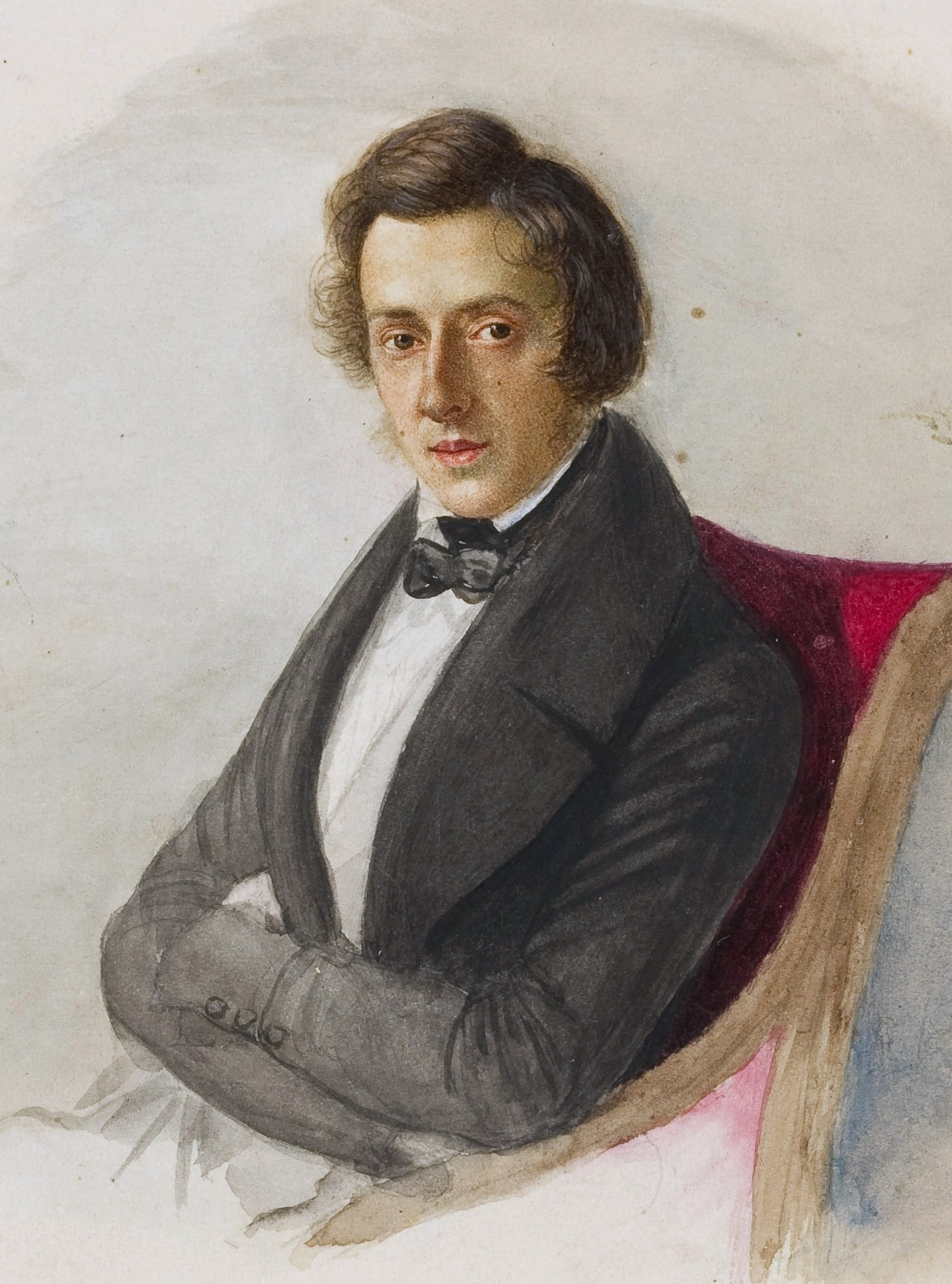
Frédéric Chopin at 25, by his fiancée Maria Wodzińska, 1835

Frédéric Chopin's waltzes are pieces of moderate length for piano, all written between 1824 and 1849. They are all in waltz triple meter, specifically 3/4 (except P. 1/13, which is in 3/8 time), but differ from earlier Viennese waltzes in not being intended for dancing; nonetheless, several have been used in ballets, most notably Les Sylphides. Some are accessible by pianists of modest capability, while others require advanced technique.

Chopin may have written as many as 35 piano waltzes, but only 19 (along with one inauthentic waltz) are numbered and only eight were published (in Opp. 18, 34, 42 and 64) before he died. His desire was that any unpublished works should be burned, but his sister Ludwika and Julian Fontana proceeded anyway to publish Waltzes 9–13 (as Opp. 69 and 70). Six waltzes composed 1824–1831 and present in Chopin’s Paris home were at first preserved but then lost in an unintended 1863 fire in Ludwika's house. Another six were eventually published as Waltzes 14–19. These Chopin had given to related people without guarding the manuscripts. Waltz 18 was untitled; it is in 3/4 time and bears some characteristics of a waltz but is marked Sostenuto. Waltz 17 is not accepted as authentic by the Fryderyk Chopin Institute; to the other five in this group it has assigned WN numbers (29, 18, 28, 53 and 63). Waltz 20 is likewise inauthentic. Another authentic waltz in A minor was rediscovered in 2024 and has not yet been published or numbered. Separately, the last variation of Chopin’s (authentic) Variations on a German National Air (Der Schweizerbub), WN 6, is in the form of a waltz. Besides, there remain:

1. Extant waltzes in private hands, unavailable to researchers (2)
2. Waltzes believed destroyed (at least 7) or simply lost (at least 3)
3. Waltzes of which documentary evidence exists but whose manuscripts are not known to exist (3)

Famous are the Minute Waltz and the Waltz in C♯ Minor, both from Op. 64, the last set of waltzes Chopin published before his death.

== List of waltzes by or attributed to Chopin ==
Series No.	Key	Composed	Published	Opus No.	Brown	Kobylańska	Chomiński	Dedication	Notes
1	E♭ major	1833	1834 (June)	Op. 18	B. 62			Laura Horsford	Grande valse brillante; used in Les Sylphides
2	A♭ major	1835	1838	Op. 34/1	B. 94			Josefine von Thun-Hohenstein	The three waltzes, Op. 34 were also published as Grandes valses brillantes, but this title is usually reserved for the Waltz in E♭ major, Op. 18
3	A minor	1831	1838	Op. 34/2	B. 64			Baroness C. d'Ivry	The three waltzes, Op. 34 were also published as Grandes valses brillantes, but this title is usually reserved for the Waltz in E♭ major, Op. 18
4	F major	1838 or earlier	1838	Op. 34/3	B. 118			Mlle. A. d'Eichthal	The three waltzes, Op. 34 were also published as Grandes valses brillantes, but this title is usually reserved for the Waltz in E♭ major, Op. 18
5	A♭ major	1840	1840	Op. 42	B. 131				Grande valse; sometimes called the 2/4 waltz since the main melody sounds as if in 2/4 time against a 3/4 bass.
6	D♭ major	1846–1847	1847	Op. 64/1	B. 164/1			Countess Delfina Potocka	Valse du petit chien is the title Chopin gave this waltz, which is popularly known as Minute Waltz
7	C♯ minor	1846–1847	1847	Op. 64/2	B. 164/2			Charlotte de Rothschild	Used in Les Sylphides and Secret
8	A♭ major	1846–1847	1847	Op. 64/3	B. 164/3			Countess Katarzyna Branicka (or Bronicka)	
9	A♭ major	1835 (24 September)	1855	Op. posth. 69/1	B. 95			Maria Wodzińska, Charlotte de Rothschild & Mme. Peruzzi	L'adieu
10	B minor	1829	1852 (Krakow)	Op. posth. 69/2	B. 35			Wilhelm Kolberg	
11	G♭ major	1833	1855	Op. posth. 70/1	B. 92				Used in Les Sylphides
12	F minor/A♭ major	1841 (June)	1852 (Krakow)	Op. posth. 70/2	B. 138			Marie de Krudner, Mme. Oury, Élise Gavard & Countess Esterházy	
13	D♭ major	1829 (3 October)	1855	Op. posth. 70/3	B. 40				
14	E minor	1830	1868	Op. posth.	B. 56	KK IVa/15	P. 1/15		No autograph exists
15	E major	1829	1861 Lviv, Ukraine	-	B. 44	KK IVa/12	P. 1/12		No autograph exists
16	A♭ major	1827	1902	-	B. 21	KK IVa/13	P. 1/13	Emilia Elsner (Note: Emilia Elsner kept an album of Chopin's manuscripts, which was destroyed during World War II.)	(Note: First published in 1902, from a manuscript in the possession of the family of Jósef Elsner, by F. Hoesick in Warsaw and Breitkopf & Härtel in Leipzig.)
17	E♭ major	1827	1902	-	B. 46	KK IVa/14	P. 1/14	Emilia Elsner	(Note: This Waltz was published together with the Waltz in A♭ major (see above, No 16).)
18	E♭ major	1840	1955	-	B. 133	KK IVb/10	P. 2/10	Émile Gaillard	Headed "Sostenuto"; not always classified as a waltz (Klavierstück). From 1938 present in the "Conservatoire Paris"
19	A minor	1847–49 (?)	1955, 1958	Op. posth.	B. 150	KK IVb/11	P. 2/11	Charlotte de Rothschild or daughter	Unedited edition pub. Paris 1955; ed. Jack Werner 1958. From 1901 present in the "Bibliotheque du Conservatoire de Paris"
20	F♯ minor	1838 (?)	1932	-		KK Anh. Ib/7 (formally Anh. Ia/7)	A. 1/7		Not by Chopin; first published in 1861, and in 1986 published under the name Valse mélancolique by Stanislaw Dybowski on the bi-weekly "Ruch Muzyczny". However, in 2012 it was discovered by Luca Chierici to be a shortened version of a piece by Charles Mayer named Le Régret, Op. 332.
-	A minor	1824	-	-	-	KK Vf		Countess Lubienska	Lost. It was reported to be in Izabela Grabowska's lost album. "A delicious waltz dedicated to Countess Lubienska" (source: Aleksander Koptiajew)
-	C major	1824 (1831?)	-	-		KK Vb/8			MS destroyed; copy of first line made by Chopin's sister Ludwika is extant
-	C major	1826	-	-		KK Vb/3			MS destroyed; copy of first line made by Chopin's sister Ludwika is extant
-	A♭ major	1827	-	-		KK Vb/4			MS destroyed; copy of first line made by Chopin's sister Ludwika is extant
-	D minor	1828	-	-		KK Vb/6			La Partenza; MS destroyed; copy of first line made by Chopin's sister Ludwika is extant
-	A minor	1829	-	-	B. 40b				Sketches for a brief prelude and main theme, discovered 1937; was in possession of H. Hinterberger of Vienna. Now believed destroyed
-	A♭ major	1829–30 (by 21 December 1830)	-	-		KK Vb/5			MS destroyed; copy of first line made by Chopin's sister Ludwika is extant. Mentioned in a letter from Chopin to his family, 21 December 1830
-	E♭ major	1829–30	-	-		KK Vb/7			MS destroyed; copy of first line made by Chopin's sister Ludwika is extant. Mentioned in letters from Breitkopf to Izabela Barcińska in 1878
-	A minor	1830–35		-					Manuscript discovered at The Morgan Library & Museum in 2024
-	?	1845 (by)	-	-	-	KK Ve/12			Mentioned in diary of L. Niedźwiecki
-	B major	1848 (12 October)	-	-	B. 166	KK Va/3		Mme. Erskine	Manuscript in a private collection (London), according to a letter of Arthur Hedley (March 10, 1960)
-	B♭ major	1849	-	-					Discovered 1952; Arthur Hedley claimed to have seen it in a private English collection, according to Jeffrey Kallberg
-	?	?	-	-	-	KK Ve/10			Listed in auction catalogue, Paris, March 1906
-	?	?	-	-	-	KK Ve/11			Mentioned in letters from Breitkopf to Izabela Barcińska in 1878
-	?	?	-	-	-	KK Vf			Several waltzes; lost. There exists a little fragment of what may be a G♭ major waltz (1847?) found on a sketch of Waltz Op. 64/1

== See also ==
- List of compositions by Frédéric Chopin by genre
- List of compositions by Frédéric Chopin by opus number
