= Waltzes, Op. posth. (Chopin) =

Waltzes by Chopin published without opus number

Waltz No. 14 in E minor, B. 56

Waltz No. 15 in E major, B. 44

Waltz No. 19 in A minor, B. 150

There are at least six waltzes by Chopin without opus numbers (a number of waltzes have been lost, including six that were catalogued by Chopin's sister Ludwika). Following the numbering system of the previous waltzes by Chopin with opus numbers, they are in order:

- No. 14: Waltz in E minor, B. 56 (1830, pub. 1851)
- No. 15: Waltz in E major, B. 44 (1829; pub. 1861)
- No. 16: Waltz in A♭ major, B. 21 (1827; pub. 1902) – manuscript in possession of the family of Jósef Elsner
- No. 17: Waltz in E♭ major, B. 46 (1827; pub. 1902) – not accepted as authentic by the Fryderyk Chopin Institute
- No. 18: Waltz in E♭ major, B. 133 (1840; pub. 1955; marked Sostenuto, not always classified as a waltz)
- No. 19: Waltz in A minor, Op. posth, B. 150 (1843, 48–49?; pub. 1955)
- unnumbered, rediscovered 2024: Waltz in A minor (1830–35; published by Henle in 2025)
