= Waltz in A-flat major =

Waltz in A-flat major may refer to:

- An arrangement of Waltz Number 15 from Sixteen Waltzes, Op. 39 (Brahms)
- Waltzes, Op. 34 (Chopin)#Waltz in A-flat major, Op. 34 No. 1
- Waltz, Op. 42 (Chopin)
- Waltz, Op. 64, No. 3 (Chopin)
- The Farewell Waltz (Chopin)
