= Op. 64 =

In music, Op. 64 stands for Opus number 64. Compositions that are assigned this number include:

- Britten – A Midsummer Night's Dream
- Chopin – Minute Waltz, Op. 64, No. 1
- Chopin – Waltz in A-flat major, Op. 64, No. 3
- Chopin – Waltz in C-sharp minor, Op. 64, No. 2
- Dvořák – Dimitrij
- Grieg – Symphonic Dances
- Haydn – String Quartets, Op. 64
- Mendelssohn – Violin Concerto
- Prokofiev – Romeo and Juliet
- Schumann – Romanzen & Balladen volume IV (3 songs)
- Scriabin – Piano Sonata No. 7
- Sibelius – The Bard (Barden), tone poem for orchestra (1913, revised 1913)
- Tchaikovsky – Symphony No. 5
