= Waltz in A minor (Chopin) =

Chopin wrote several Waltzes in A minor, including:

- Waltz in A minor, Op. posth. (Chopin)
- Waltzes, Op. 34 (Chopin)#Waltz in A minor, Op. 34 No. 2
- Waltz in A minor (Chopin, rediscovered 2024)
