= Waltz in E major (Chopin) =

Waltz written by Chopin in 1829

- by Frédéric Chopin
- Key: E major
- Catalogue: Brown index: B. 44; Chopin National Edition: WN 18; Krystyna Kobylańska: KK IVa/12; Chomiński: P. 1/12
- Style: Romantic music Waltz

Waltz in E major
Performed by Olga Gurevich

Frédéric Chopin's Waltz in E major, B. 44, is one of his lesser known waltzes, discovered in his folder containing musical works that he did not want to be published.

The waltz was written in 1829 and published in 1861. It was among the first of Chopin's posthumously published waltzes not to be given a posthumous opus number.

== Form ==
7-part rondo form as follows:

A-B-A-C-A-B-A,

where the A's are each in E major, the B's are each in G-sharp minor, and the C is in A major.
