= Waltz in E minor (Chopin) =

Composition by Chopin

- by Frédéric Chopin
- Key: E minor
- Catalogue: Brown index: B. 56; Chopin National Edition: WN 29; Krystyna Kobylańska: KK IVa/15; Chomiński: P. 1/15
- Style: Romantic music Waltz

Waltz in E minor, B. 56
Performed by Olga Gurevich

The Waltz in E minor, Op. posth., is a waltz for solo piano by Frédéric Chopin. It was composed circa 1830 and published in May 1851.

It was the first of Chopin's posthumously published waltzes not to be given an opus number. It was composed shortly before Chopin left Poland at the age of 20. Although this is the final (fourteenth) waltz in the older editions of Chopin (other waltzes being included in more recent editions), it is believed to have been composed before any of the waltzes published in Chopin's lifetime.

In a typical performance, this waltz lasts just under three minutes.

In 1956, Jerome Robbins choreographed his ballet The Concert (or, The Perils of Everybody) which uses, among other works by Chopin, the Waltz in E minor for the portion known as the "Mistake Waltz".

== Structure ==
This E minor waltz is in a modified rondo form as "Introduction–A–B–A–B–A–C–A'–coda". The "C" is in E major with temporary modulations to G-sharp minor.
