= The Concert (ballet) =

The Concert (or The Perils of Everybody) is a ballet by Jerome Robbins, created for New York City Ballet, set to Chopin's:

Polonaise in A major "Military", Op. 40, No. 1
Berceuse in D flat major, Op. 57
Prelude in F minor, Op. 28, No. 18

Prelude in B flat minor, Op. 28, No. 16
Waltz in E minor, Op. posth.
Prelude in A major, Op. 28, No. 7

Prelude in E minor, Op. 28, No. 4
Mazurka in G major, KK IIa/2
Ballade No. 3 in A flat major, Op. 47

The premiere took place at City Center of Music and Drama, New York, on 6 March 1956, with décor by Saul Steinberg, costumes by Irene Sharaff and lighting by Ronald Bates. Robbins choreographed three subsequent ballets to Chopin's music: Dances at a Gathering (1969), In the Night (1970), and Other Dances (1976).

In 2008 in The New York Times, Alastair Macaulay called The Concert "the most sheerly funny of all ballets.... a true classic, full of jokes that you find yourself quoting in everyday life."

== Original cast ==
- Tanaquil LeClercq
- Todd Bolender
- Yvonne Mounsey
- Robert Barnett
- Wilma Curley
- John Mandia
- Shaun O'Brien
- Patricia Savoia
- Richard Thomas

== Other companies (selected) ==
- The Australian Ballet, premiered May 10, 1979. Revived 1987, 2008.
- Boston Ballet
- Houston Ballet
- Pacific Northwest Ballet
- Paris Opera Ballet
- Perm Opera and Ballet Theatre, premiered April 13, 2007.
- The Royal Ballet, premiered March 4, 1975. Revived 1976, 1978, 1979, 1980, 1981, 1986, 1987, 1988, 1999, 2000, 2001, 2007, 2014, 2018.
- Stanislavski and Nemirovich-Danchenko Moscow Academic Music Theatre, premiered July 10, 2010.
- Vienna State Ballet
- San Francisco Ballet

== Reviews ==
- NY Times, John Martin, March 7, 1956
- NY Times, Anna Kisselgoff, November 26, 1983
- NY Times, Jennifer Dunning, May 15, 2001
- NY Times, Alastair Macaulay, January 5, 2008
