= Prelude, Op. 28, No. 2 (Chopin) =

Piano composition by Frédéric Chopin

The Prelude, Op. 28, No. 2 is one of Frédéric Chopin's 24 preludes for piano. It was likely composed between 1831 and 1832, and published in 1839.

== History ==
The piece was composed by Frédéric Chopin in September 1831 in Stuttgart after he had learned of the failure of the Polish insurrection during the November Uprising. The time of the composition was corroborated by Princess Marcelina Czartoryska, friend and confidante of the composer, who shared with him the anxieties and concerns for their homeland. Chopin experienced profound crisis during the November Uprising, which ruined his hopes and those of his compatriots, fundamentally influenced Prelude, Op. 28, No. 2 in A minor.

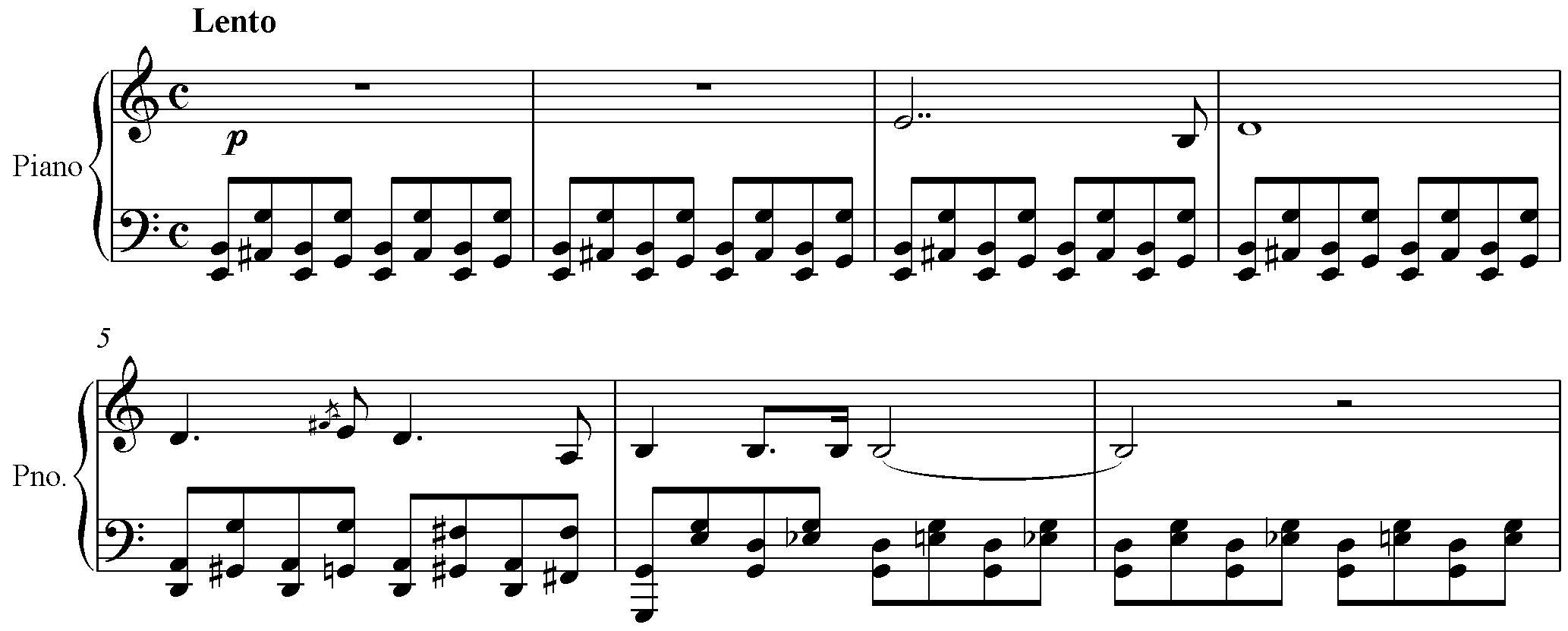
The first seven measures of the Prelude in A minor

The song had been often criticized by both listeners and critics because of its dramatic, painful, and desolate peculiarity, its portrayal of moral despair, and especially its unusual harmonic innovations. The musicologist Kleczyński went so far as to say that "Prelude No. 2 should not be played", and André Gide called it "terrifying". Today it remains the least performed Prelude of the entire cycle.

However, Franz Liszt had sensed peculiarity of this composition, writing that there was indeed something harsh in his music but expressed "with the boldness of the harmonies". According to Chopin scholar Gastone Belotti, in more recent times, music critics have recognized the importance of the composition. What had always been considered the most problematic of Chopin's works, today is seen as "a gem, one of the pinnacles of musical intuition" that "anticipates the impressionistic conception of sonority". Józef Michał Chomiński saw it as an almost prophetic vision of what the music of the future would be, going beyond his time by several decades by emancipating dissonance and thus overcoming tonality.

== Analysis ==
The piece differs not only from the other preludes, but from any of Chopin's compositions. The melody, a fundamental element in the composer's music, almost does not exist here—it is fragmentary, without development, consisting of a single five-bar phrase that is repeated twice more, varying the rhythm; in the short coda it is still present, shortened and expressed as a hint. The pauses that distance the various repetitions are always different giving music an asymmetrical character. The intense and dramatic nature of the composition makes differs it from the contemporary compositions.

The accompaniment, consisted of a continuous succession of diminished octaves, never used until then in compositions, has a disturbing effect. Additionally, the main tonality that manifests itself only at the fourteenth bar out of a total of 23, creates harmonic ambiguity, which, combined with the use of desolate, flaky, but hard sonorities, resembles impressionistic music.
