= Rondo in E-flat major (Chopin) =

Rondo composed by Frédéric Chopin

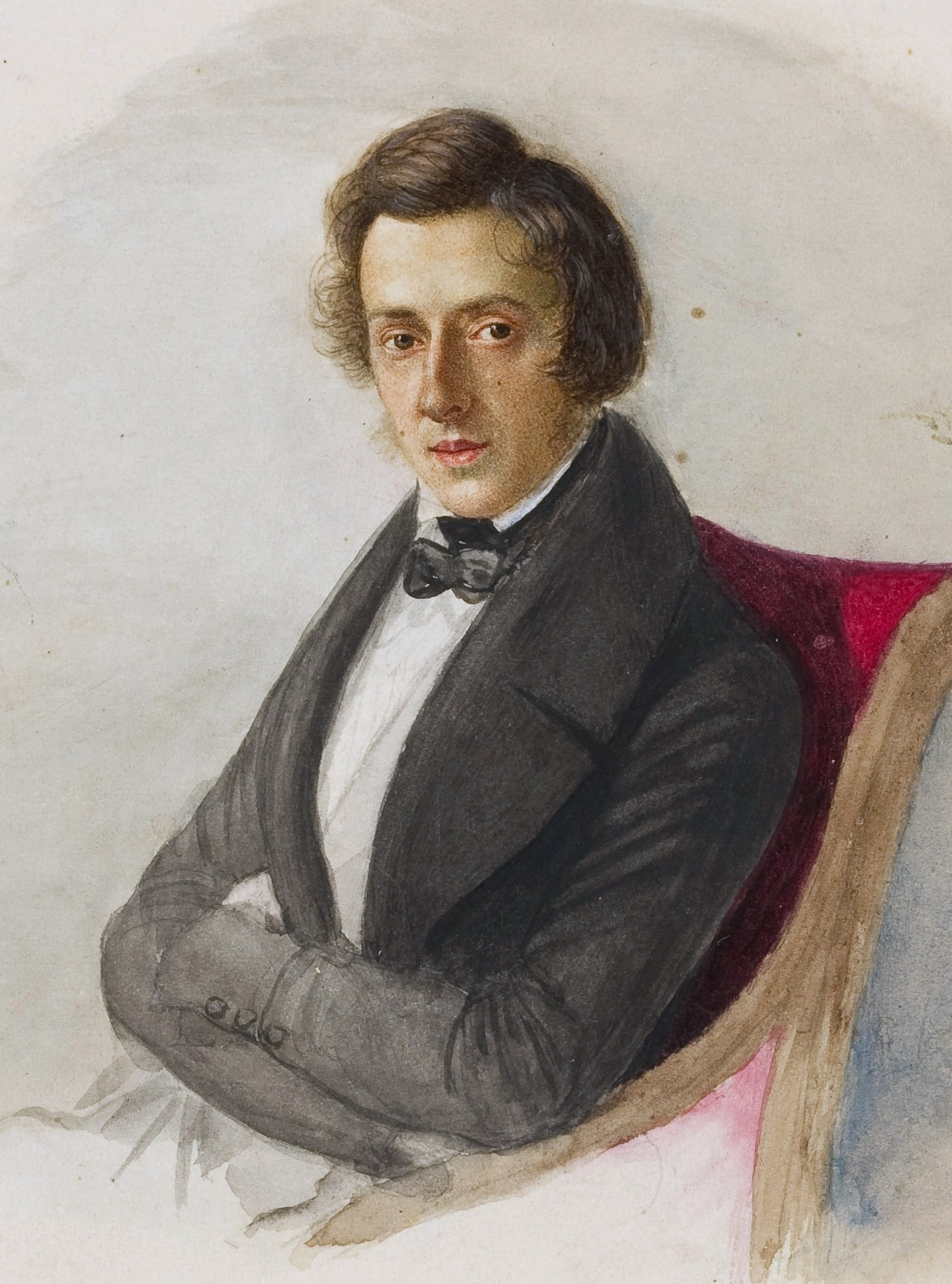
Frédéric Chopin at 25, by his fiancée Maria Wodzińska, 1835

The Rondo in E♭ major, Op. 16, sometimes called Introduction and Rondo, is a classical composition by Frédéric Chopin, written in 1833. It was dedicated to his pupil Caroline Hartmann.

== Analysis ==
The piece is written in rondo form. It begins with a passionate introduction in C minor, followed by the joyful main theme in E♭ major. The second theme is still lively, but somewhat more subdued than the first. To conclude, the main theme returns, followed by the coda. The piece as a whole is varied and interesting, but challenging for the pianist. The average performance of this piece lasts around 10 minutes.
