= Rondo à la mazur =

Composition for piano by Frédéric Chopin

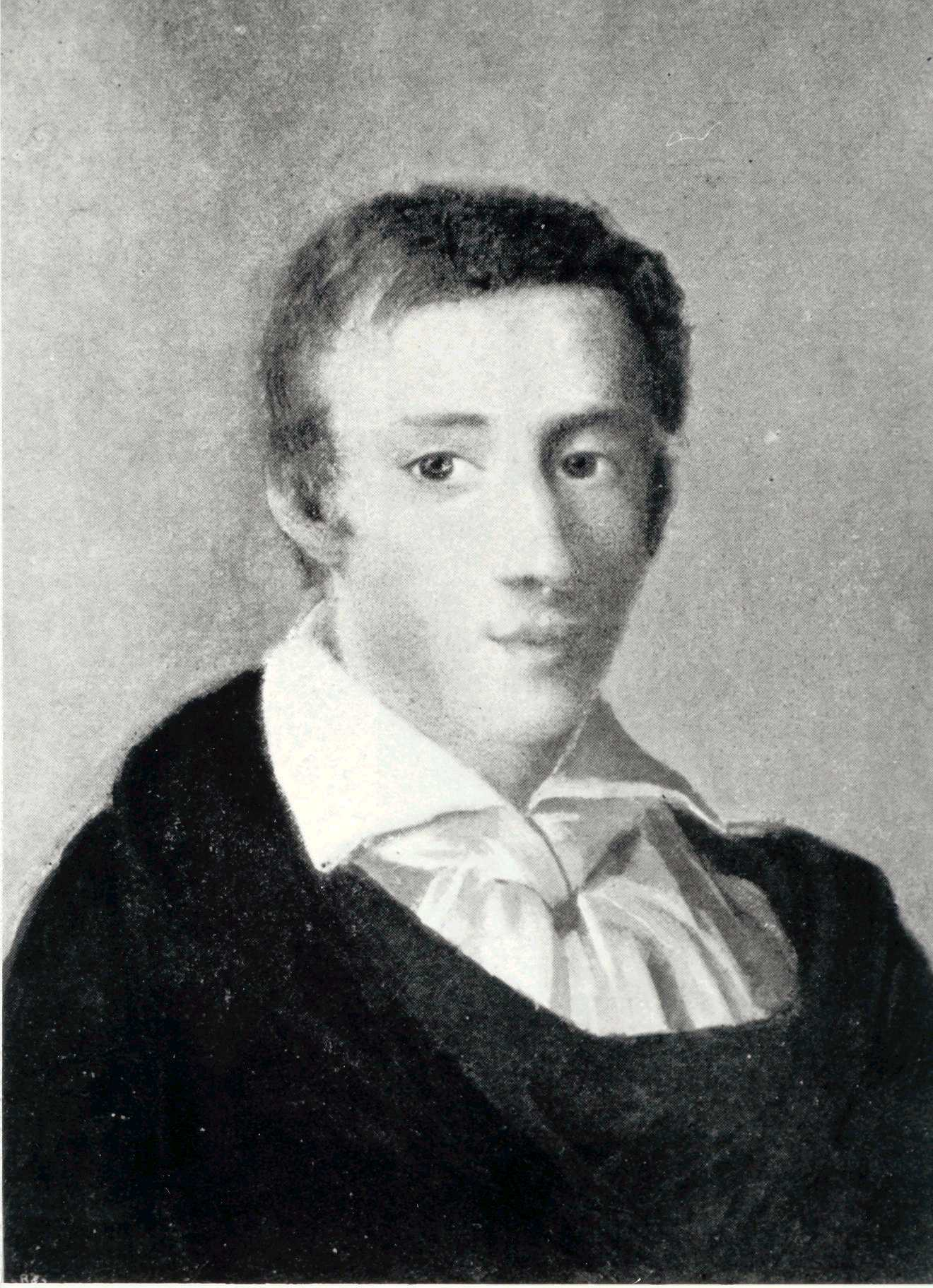
Frédéric Chopin by Mieroszewski, 1829

The Rondo à la mazur in F major, Op. 5, was written by Polish composer, Frédéric Chopin in 1826, when he was 16, and published in 1828. It was the second of his four rondos, and is dedicated to the Countess Alexandrine de Moriolles, the daughter of the Count de Moriolles, who was the tutor to the adopted son of the Grand Duke Constantine, Governor of Warsaw. It is the only one of the four rondos not written in 2/4 time.

Chopin wrote the piece while studying at the Warsaw Conservatory. It is a bravura piece, and technically more assured than his Opus 1, the Rondo in C minor. His teacher Józef Elsner had also written two rondos marked à la mazur, and they may have inspired the title, but Chopin's rondo displays none of Elsner's influence. Instead, there is much of Chopin's own originality.

The opening theme, in F major, is in the rhythm of a mazurka. A second theme, in B♭, marked Tranquillamente e cantabile, appears, before the main theme returns. The piece is notable for Chopin's very early use of the sharpened 4th degree characteristic of the Lydian mode.

Robert Schumann first heard the Rondo à la mazur in 1836, and he called it "lovely, enthusiastic and full of grace. He who does not yet know Chopin had best begin the acquaintance with this piece".
