= Étude Op. 10, No. 11 (Chopin) =

Piano composition by Frédéric Chopin

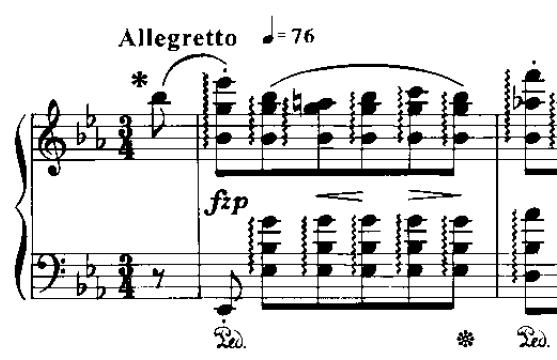
Excerpt from the beginning of Étude Op. 10, No. 11

Étude Op. 10, No. 11, in E♭ major, is a technical study composed by Frédéric Chopin. It is sometimes known as the "Arpeggio" or "Guitar" Étude. The chief difficulty addressed in this piece is the performance of extended arpeggiated chords. Throughout, the hands are required to stretch intervals as large as twelfths. The melody, though usually the highest note of each chord, is often found in inner parts with higher parts simply being part of the accompaniment. This is especially the case in the final bars. The piece is also notable for its chromatic harmonies, daring at the time, and enharmonic shifts.

Étude No. 11
Martha Goldstein playing on an Erard (1851)
