= Impromptu No. 2 (Chopin) =

1839 piano composition by Chopin

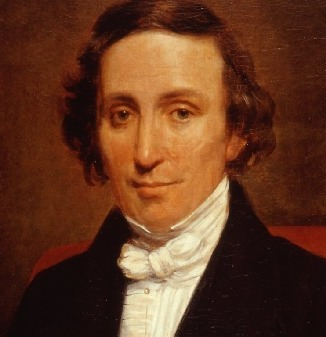
Chopin in 1840

Impromptu No. 2 in F♯ major, Op. 36
Performed by Frank Lévy

Frédéric Chopin's Impromptu No. 2 in F♯ major, Op. 36, was composed in 1839 and published in the following year.

== Music ==
The impromptu begins with a nocturne-like atmosphere. Deep bass notes cue a passionate section, which is then followed by a lighter section with quick runs. The nocturne-like atmosphere returns, and the piece ends in a passionate F♯ major chord.

The piece is in the rare key of F♯ major, which is used in very few major compositions in the Romantic era outside of piano music. Larger examples of works in this key are Ludwig van Beethoven's Piano Sonata No. 24 and Chopin's Barcarolle.
