= Variations for Flute and Piano in E major (Chopin) =

Musical composition attributed to Frédéric Chopin

Variations on "Non più mesta"
- attributed to Frédéric Chopin
- English: Variations for flute and piano on a theme from Rossini's La Cenerentola
- Key: E major
- Catalogue: B. 9, KK Anh. Ia/5
- Form: Theme and variations
- Composed: c. 1829
- Scoring: Flute, piano

The Variations on "Non più mesta" from Rossini's La Cenerentola is a composition for flute and piano in E major, attributed to Frédéric Chopin. The work, likely composed around 1829, has been the subject of musicological debate regarding its authenticity. Modern scholarship, particularly the research for the Chopin National Edition, suggests that while the entire work is not by Chopin, he likely composed the minor-key variation and may have had limited involvement in the rest of the piece.

== Background ==
External audio
- Performed by Bruno Cavallo
- Variations on "Non più mesta"

The theme for the variations is the final rondo, "Non più mesta accanto al fuoco", from Gioachino Rossini's 1817 opera La Cenerentola. The idea for the composition is believed to have arisen after the opera's Warsaw premiere on 29 August 1829. The work is associated with Józef Cichocki, an amateur flautist and friend of Chopin, who likely initiated the project.

The only surviving source is a manuscript written by an unknown copyist. Its provenance is well-documented: it was owned by Chopin's school friend Józef Nowakowski, who gave it to Adam Münchheimer, a founder of the Warsaw Music Society. This lineage, along with mentions by Chopin biographer Ferdynand Hoesick linking the work to Chopin and Cichocki, led to its initial acceptance into the Chopin canon.

== Structure ==
The work consists of a theme and four variations in E major, except for Variation 2 (in the manuscript, Variation 3 in the Ekier edition), which is marked Più lento and is in E minor (the parallel minor).

== Authorship ==
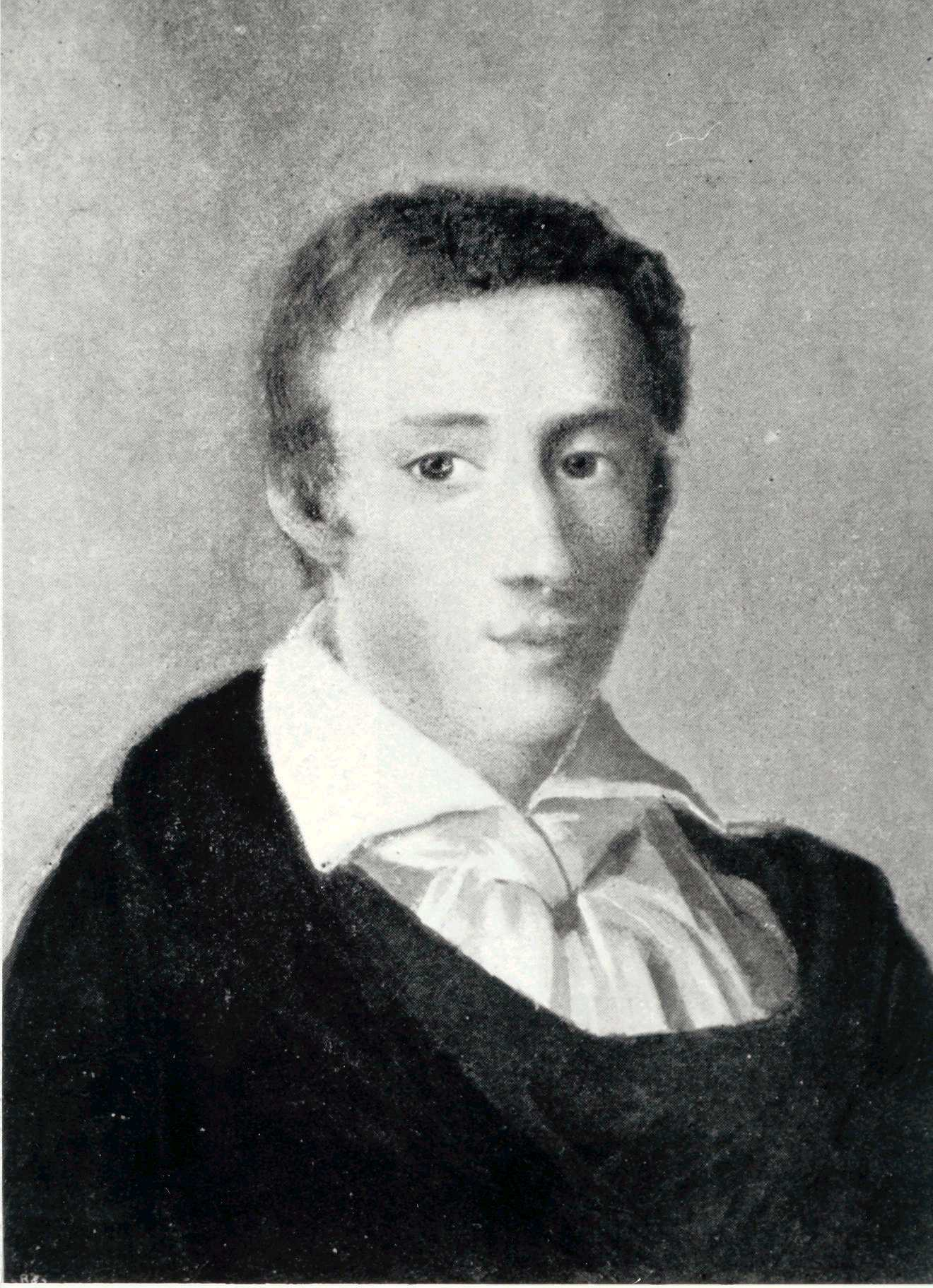
Chopin, by Mieroszewski, 1829

The authorship of the Variations has been a subject of scholarly debate for decades. While traditionally attributed to Chopin, significant stylistic and structural issues have cast doubt on his sole authorship. The central problem, as summarized by the editors of the Chopin National Edition, is that the work is considered well-written and effective for the flute but weak and error-prone for the piano; it is unlikely that Chopin would have composed a piece with such a disparity in quality. As early as 1953, musicologist Jan Prosnak concluded that only the virtuosic flute part could be considered genuinely Chopinesque, while the piano part was suspect. More recent analysis, led by Jan Ekier, has advanced a hypothesis of partial authorship, suggesting the work was a collaboration.

Arguments against Chopin's full authorship center on the piano accompaniment and the work's overall structure. The piano writing in the major-key variations is undifferentiated and contains serious harmonic errors that clash with the flute part, a weakness uncharacteristic of Chopin's sophisticated style. Furthermore, the piece lacks a formal introduction and finale, both of which are standard features in Chopin's other variation sets. The minor-key variation also appears prematurely in the sequence, a formal choice never seen in works confirmed to be by Chopin.

Despite these issues, strong evidence points to Chopin's involvement. The manuscript's clear provenance from Chopin's inner circle and historical accounts from Hoesick provide a firm external link; the most compelling musical evidence is found in the minor-key variation, which stands apart from the rest of the work with its distinctly "Chopinesque" lyrical and harmonic traits. The manuscript contains pencil corrections of errors, but these are found only in the piano part of this specific minor-key variation. The manner of these corrections is consistent with how Chopin was known to mark up scores, suggesting he personally reviewed and amended this section.

Based on this evidence, Ekier proposed a plausible scenario for the work's creation as a joint effort with Cichocki. Following a performance of La Cenerentola, Cichocki likely suggested the idea to Chopin. Chopin may have sketched the theme from memory and then composed the lyrical minor-key variation himself. Cichocki, using his expertise with the flute, would have written the other, more virtuosic variations but poorly adapted the piano accompaniment by simply repeating the theme's harmony, leading to the errors in the piano part. When Cichocki presented the finished manuscript, Chopin likely reviewed and corrected only his own contribution (the minor variation) which explains both the work's uneven quality and the localized nature of the corrections. The joint composition of variation sets was not unusual at the time, a famous example being Hexaméron. Chopin himself documented a similar plan in a letter, writing of a collaboration with the violinist Josef Slavík on a set of variations on a theme by Beethoven "that we are writing together". In that instance, too, Chopin was tasked with composing the slow, lyrical variation.
