= Étude Op. 25, No. 2 (Chopin) =

First measures of Chopin's Étude Op. 25, No. 2. (Urtext edition).

Étude Op. 25, No. 2, in F minor, is an étude composed by Frédéric Chopin. It was marked 'Presto'. It was preceded by a relative major key. It is based on a polyrhythm, with pairs of eighth-note (quaver) triplets in the right hand against quarter-note (crotchet) triplets in the left.

Johannes Brahms wrote a revision of this étude, where the right hand part is played entirely in sixths and thirds. Virtuoso pianist and composer Leopold Godowsky later transcribed the étude for the left hand alone (transposed to F-sharp minor).
