= Étude Op. 25, No. 8 (Chopin) =

Étude written by Chopin

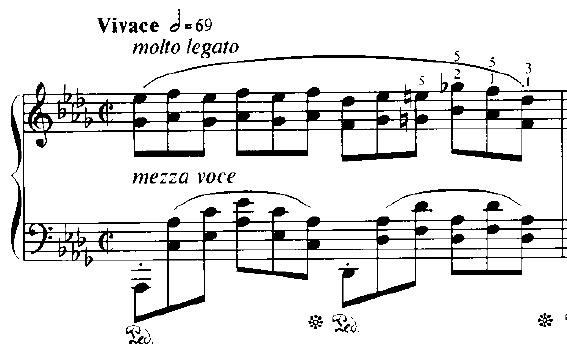
Excerpt from the beginning of the Étude Op. 25 No. 8

Étude Op. 25, No. 8, in D♭ major, is a technical piano study composed by Frédéric Chopin.

Étude Op. 25, No. 8 is a composition in D♭ major, employing notes related as sixths throughout the piece. Two examples in the opening of sixth intervals are A♭ to F and G♭ to E♭. Chopin composed this etude with sixth-note intervals to be played with both hands.

This etude is composed with sixths being played in both hands. The technical skill required to play it makes this etude one of the most difficult in Op.25. Its unusual sound is due to the uninterrupted succession of ascending, descending and chromatic sixths. It is written in, but not in 12/8 time.

Étude Op. 25, No. 8
Martha Goldstein playing on an Érard (1851) - 1255KB
