= Étude Op. 25, No. 12 (Chopin) =

Frédéric Chopin's formal studies for the piano, opus 25

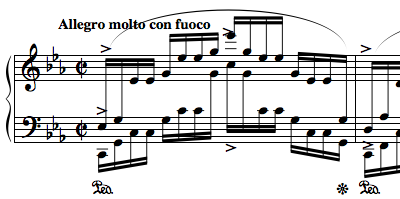
Excerpt from the Étude Op. 25, No. 12

Étude Op. 25, No. 12 in C minor is one of Frédéric Chopin's formal studies for the piano, opus 25, dedicated À Madame la Comtesse d'Agoult. It was first published in 1837 in French, German, and English. In the first French edition, the time signature is 4/4, but most recent editions of this piece follow the manuscript and German editions, which indicate cut time. This work is a series of rising and falling arpeggios in various chord progressions from C minor. It is sometimes nicknamed the "Ocean" étude.

== Structure ==
The entire work, except the coda, consists wholly of semiquaver (sixteenth note) arpeggios, spanning large lengths of the keyboard in the space of one bar. The initial theme is expounded upon and changes to many different keys. The climax resolves to C major.

== See also ==
- Études (Chopin)
