= Mazurkas, Op. 30 (Chopin) =

Mazurka in C minor, Op. 30 No. 1

Mazurka in D♭ major, Op. 30 No. 3

Mazurka in C♯ minor, Op. 30 No. 4
Performed by Edward Neeman

The Op. 30 mazurkas, by Frédéric Chopin, are a set of 4 mazurkas written and published in 1837:

- No. 1, in C minor
- No. 2, in B minor (ends in F♯ minor)
- No. 3, in D♭ major
- No. 4, in C♯ minor
