= Étude Op. 10, No. 9 (Chopin) =

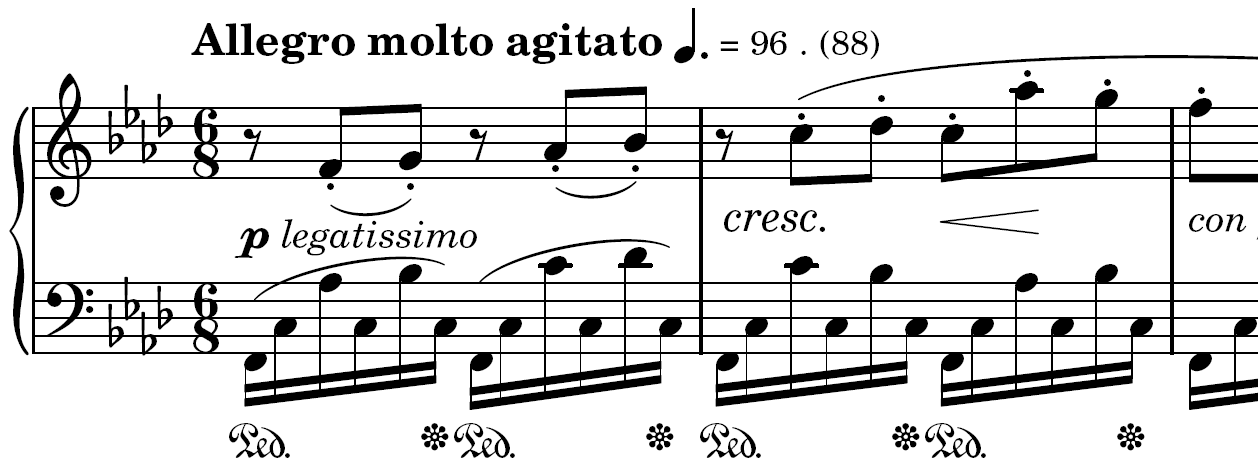
Étude Op. 10, No. 9 incipit

Étude No.9
Martha Goldstein playing on an Érard (1851) - 2.13 MB

Étude Op. 10, No. 9, in F minor, is a technical study composed by Frédéric Chopin in 1829. This étude is part of the twelve studies which belong to Op. 10. It is widely regarded as a brilliant étude for the left hand because it promotes flexibility in the wrists, finger agility, and endurance.
