= Prelude, Op. 28, No. 1 (Chopin) =

Piano Composition by Frédéric Chopin

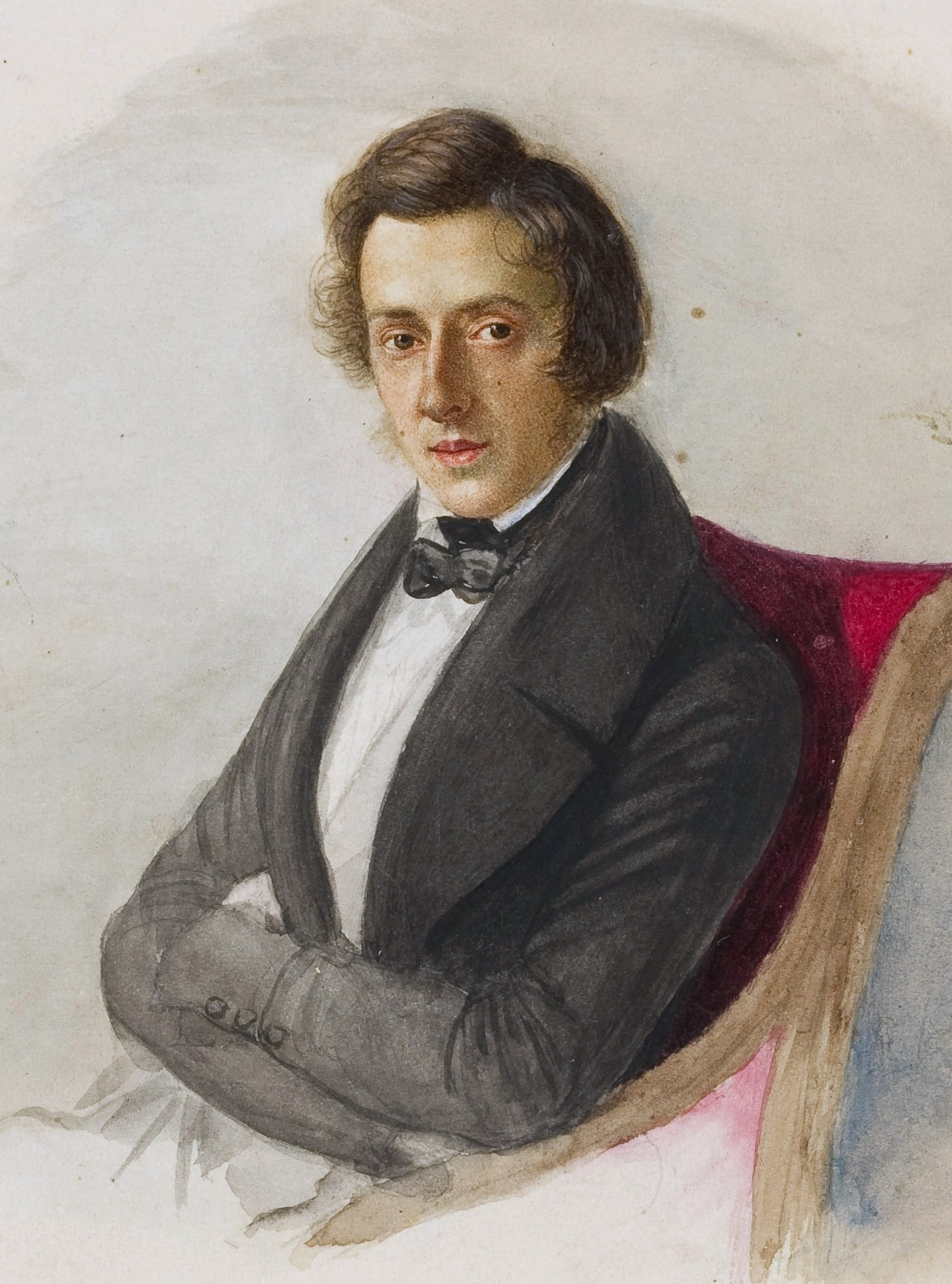
Frédéric Chopin at 25, by his fiancée Maria Wodzińska, 1835

The Prelude, Op. 28, No. 1 is the first of Frédéric Chopin's 24 preludes for piano. It was published in 1839 and dedicated to Camille Pleyel. Pianist Vladimir de Pachmann noted this prelude as "The first one is in a style that reminds one very forcibly of Schumann."

== Analysis ==
Marked Agitato ("agitated") and in the key of C major, this prelude is in 2/8 time. This prelude lasts from about 40 seconds to one minute and is a mere 34 bars (or measures) long. This prelude consists of 8-bar phrases with a coda in the end of the piece and consists of arpeggios with four-part harmony. From bars 16–20, a stretto is listed in the English and French first editions of the piece, which means increase the tempo in the piece, though this is not written in the Italian first edition. Throughout the piece, the piece shifts out of C major but doesn't modulate to a different key. According to Marilyn Anne Meier, an Australian concert pianist, the prelude should be played "…by playing the semiquavers intensely legato, not articulated and separated."

== Name ==
Chopin did not publish any textual names for his preludes. However, later pianists Alfred Cortot and Hans von Bülow created nicknames for this piece, Cortot naming this "Feverish anticipation of loved ones" and Bülow naming this "Reunion".
