= Étude Op. 25, No. 4 (Chopin) =

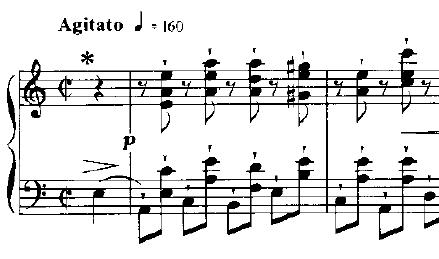
Excerpt from the beginning of the Étude Op. 25 No. 4

Étude Op. 25, No. 4 in A minor is a technical study composed by Frédéric Chopin. It is marked Agitato at the head. This piece is like a polka. The technique explored in this piece is the performance of off-beat staccato chords set against a regular on-beat bass. This is an example of syncopation. The left hand leaps intervals of up to a tenth (octave plus a third) between the bass and the lowest note of the following chord (and back): this requires a very strong left hand 5th finger. Very often, the performer is required to hold the uppermost note of the right hand in legato while continuing to play the rest of the chord in that hand (and in the left hand) as staccato: this requires a very strong right hand 5th finger. The ending is marked Lento and pianissimo and the chords are all on beat in stark contrast with the rest of the piece.
