= Impromptu No. 3 (Chopin) =

Composition for piano by Frédéric Chopin

Impromptu No. 3 in G♭ major, Op. 51
Performed by Frank Lévy

Frédéric Chopin's Impromptu No. 3 in G♭ major, Op. 51, for piano, was composed in 1842 and published in February 1843. It was the last in order of composition of his four impromptus, but the third published.

The piece is written in 12/8 time.
