= Polonaises, Op. 26 (Chopin) =

Set of works by Frédéric Chopin

The two Op. 26 Polonaises were composed by Frédéric Chopin in 1836. Both of them were dedicated to Josef Dessauer. These were his first published polonaises.

== Pieces ==
=== No. 1 in C♯ minor ===
Polonaise in C♯ minor, Op. 26 No. 1
Performed by Xuan He

The Polonaise opens with a fiery Allegro appassionato in C♯ minor, the primary theme preceded by descending octaves. The section climaxes with a series of virtuosic arpeggio figures which give way to a tender melody. This is then followed by a repetition of the theme. After this opening section, there is a new theme introduced in the enharmonic D♭ major. This new theme is then developed and followed by a new left hand melody, which increases the tension until a repeat of the meno mosso. The piece ends in abrupt quietness.

=== Op. 26 No. 2 in E♭ minor ===
Polonaise in E♭ minor, Op. 26 No. 2
Performed by Xuan He

The Polonaise opens ominously but soon builds to become more agitated and passionate. The middle of the piece is a contrast to the dark atmosphere of the piece. Following the return of the main theme, the piece closes with subtlety, like its opus companion.
