= Prelude, Op. 28, No. 16 (Chopin) =

Piano Composition by Frédéric Chopin

The Prelude Op. 28, No. 16, the "Hades" prelude, by Frédéric Chopin, is considered by many to be the most difficult of the Chopin preludes. Hans von Bülow dubbed this prelude "Hades." It was composed between 1836 and 1839, published in 1839 and dedicated to Camille Pleyel who commissioned the opus 28 preludes for 2,000 francs.

Written in B♭ minor, the prelude opens with six heavily accented chords before progressing to an impromptu-like passage in the right hand. While the right hand must cover some four to six pages (depending on the edition) of sixteenth notes in around a minute at a presto con fuoco tempo, most pianists find the prime difficulty of the prelude to be the rapid follow-through motion of the three-note left-hand chord groups.
