= Mazurkas, Op. 63 (Chopin) =

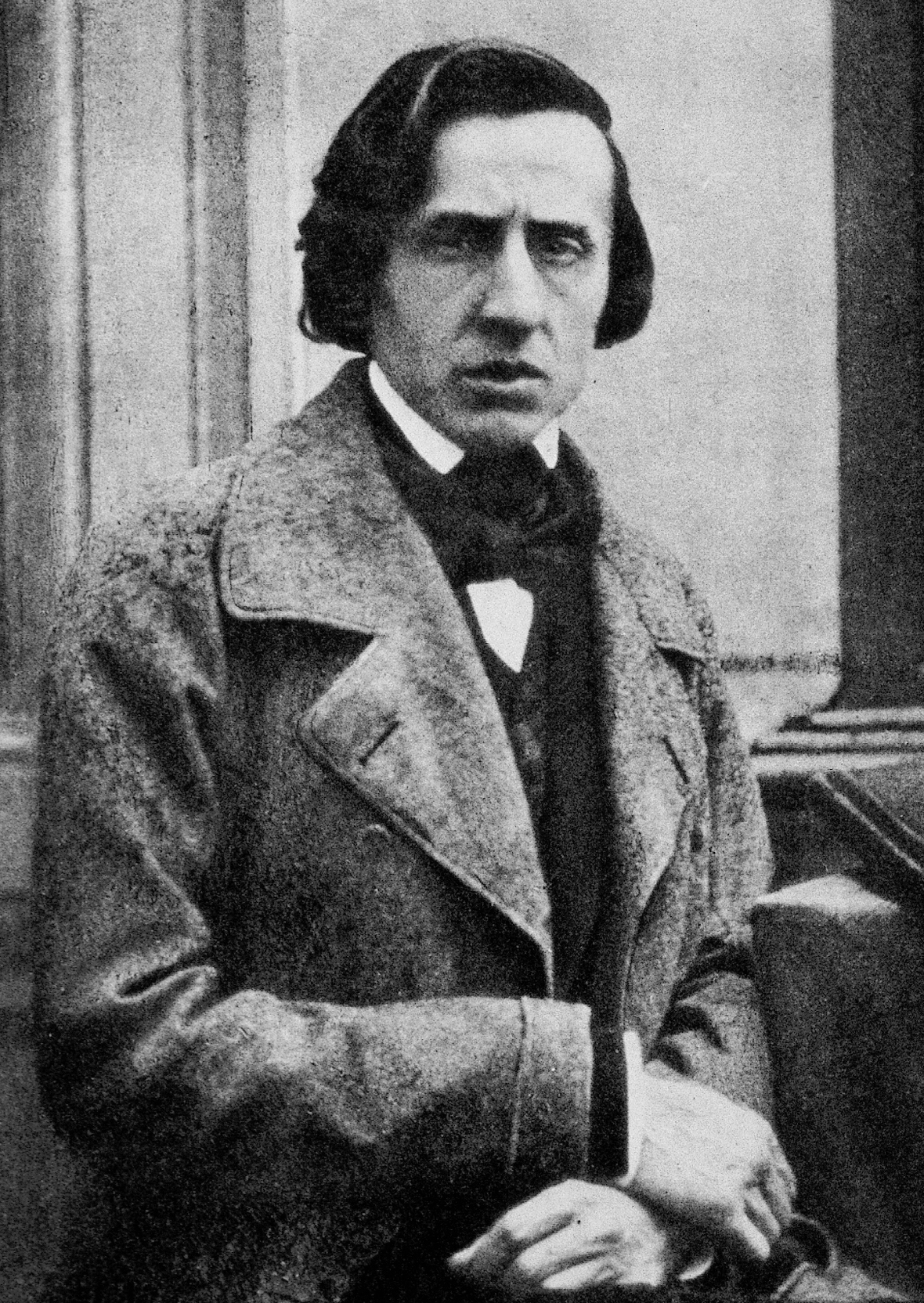
Frédéric Chopin, c. 1849

The Op. 63 Mazurkas by Frédéric Chopin are a set of three mazurkas for solo piano written in 1846 and published in 1847. These were Chopin's last set of mazurkas published during his lifetime. They demonstrate the composer's "late" style and may suggest a maturity of his emotional approach to the mazurka as a musical form.

== Analysis ==
=== Mazurka in B major, Op. 63, No. 1 ===
No. 1 in B major

The first mazurka in B major, marked Vivace, begins with a lively theme filled with flourishes. It is then followed by a simpler second theme rustic in nature before returning to the main theme. It lasts about two and a half minutes.

=== Mazurka in F minor, Op. 63, No. 2 ===
No. 2 in F minor

The F minor mazurka, marked Lento, begins with a melancholic and introspective theme. The middle section, in A♭ major, allows a brief respite from the solemn atmosphere. Soon, however, a reprise of the main theme is heard, which then fades in a descending chromatic episode. The piece demonstrates Chopin's mastery of lyricism, along with subtle nuances in the inner voices. It is the shortest mazurka of the set and takes under two minutes to perform.

=== Mazurka in C♯ minor, Op. 63, No. 3 ===
No. 3 in C♯ minor

The final mazurka in C♯ minor, a true kujawiak (a national Polish dance slightly slower than a mazurka), is the final one willfully published by Chopin. The main theme is songful in character. This expessive theme is followed by a short sotto voce section, invoking the seemingly forgotten mazurka spirit. A reprise of the main theme quickly enters, this time in a modified form with a rare canon a beat's length away. This bold effect intensifies the mood, culminating in a dramatic finish to the intimate and mournful atmosphere. It takes around two and a half minutes to perform.
