= Waltz in A minor, Op. posth. (Chopin) =

Composition by Frédéric Chopin

Waltz in A minor
- by Frédéric Chopin
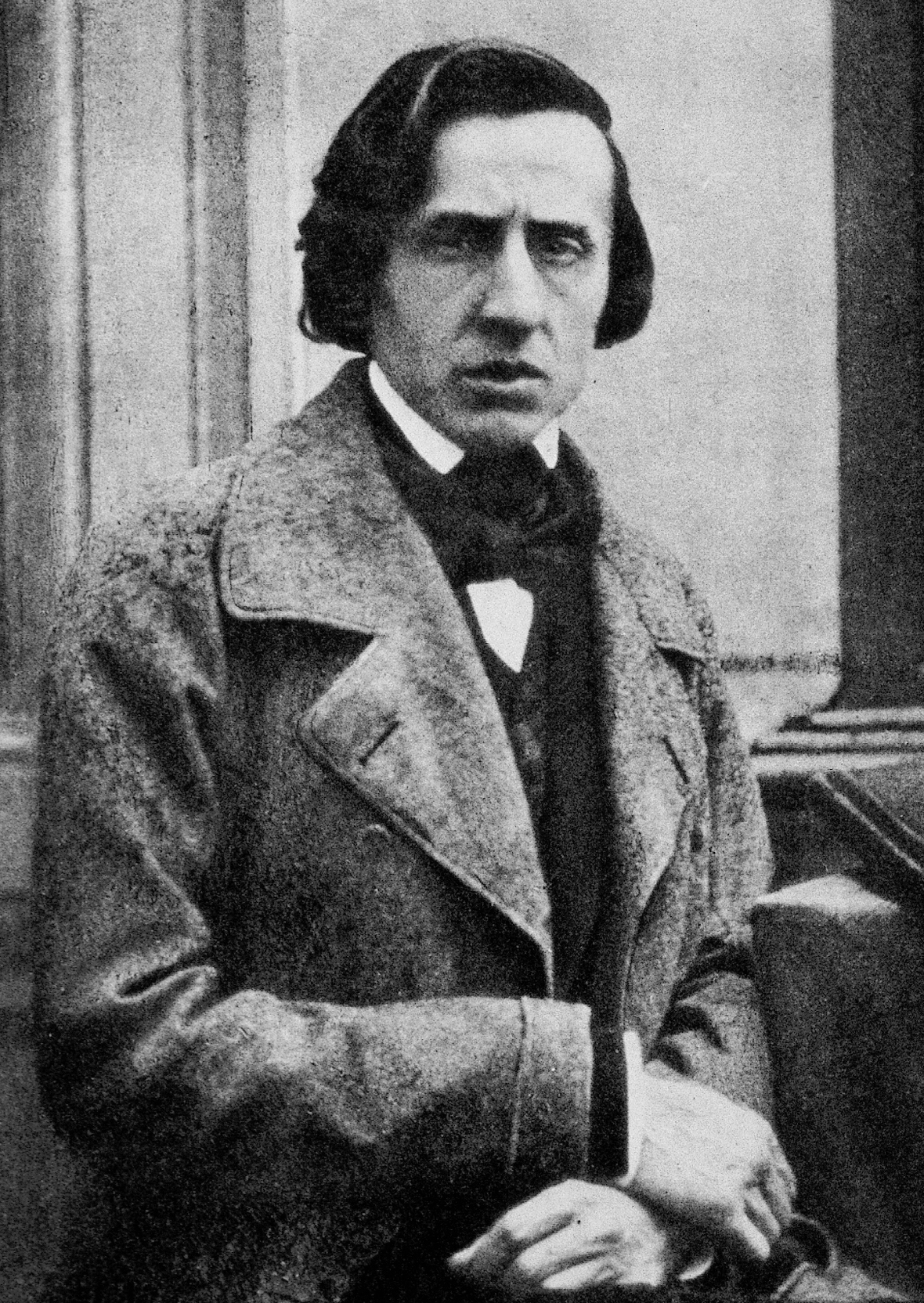
- Daguerreotype of Chopin, c. 1849
- Key: A minor
- Catalogue: Brown index: B. 150; Chopin National Edition: WN 63; Krystyna Kobylańska: KK IVb/11; Chomiński: P. 2/11
- Style: Romantic music Waltz
- Form: Rondo
- Composed: 1847–49
- Movements: One

Waltz in A minor, B. 150
Performed by Aya Higuchi

Frédéric Chopin's Waltz in A minor, Op. posth., B. 150, is a waltz for solo piano. The waltz was published in 1860, after the composer's death, by Jacques Maho. At this time, it was attributed to Charlotte de Rothschild and was published as no. 3 of "Four pieces for piano". This collection also included Chopin's Nocturne in C minor, B. 108. In The Musical Quarterly, January 1939, Jacques-Gabriel Prod'homme first reported the waltz. In 1955, this piece was published in the special edition of the magazine La Revue Musicale and finally reattributed to Chopin. In 1965, it was republished by Andrzej Koszewski.

There is disagreement over the date of composition: Chopin National Edition gives 1847–49, Maurice J. E. Brown gives 1843, and Gastone Belotti gives 1832–33 (specifically early 1833). Prod'homme referred to the waltz as a "youthful" work. Koszewski expressed that the waltz belonged to the Warsaw period of the composer, though also saying that it could date from a later period.

== Structure and analysis ==
This waltz is structured as a single movement in rondo form marked Allegretto. It is one of Chopin's shortest and technically easiest waltzes.

Robert Cummings described the piece as showing both sadness and hope. The first theme consists of sixteen measures in four phrases with slight variation, using a simple sad melody decorated by ornaments. The second theme is eight measures long, being repeated. It is more lively, punctuated by a brisk ascending arpeggio, yet it still has a certain sadness. The next section consists of sixteen measures and is repeated. It replaces a Trio in a typical waltz, starting with the main theme again before modulating to A major, featuring a joyful melody. The piece ends with a return of the first three phrases of the main theme, before concluding with a short coda in A minor. The overall layout can be given as A B A′ C A″.
