= Waltzes, Op. 34 (Chopin) =

1838 group of three musical works

The three Waltzes, Op. 34, were composed by Frédéric Chopin from 1834 until 1838 and published in 1838. These three waltzes were published as Grandes valses brillantes, but this title is usually reserved for the Waltz in E♭ major, Op. 18.

== Pieces ==
=== No. 1 in A♭ major ===
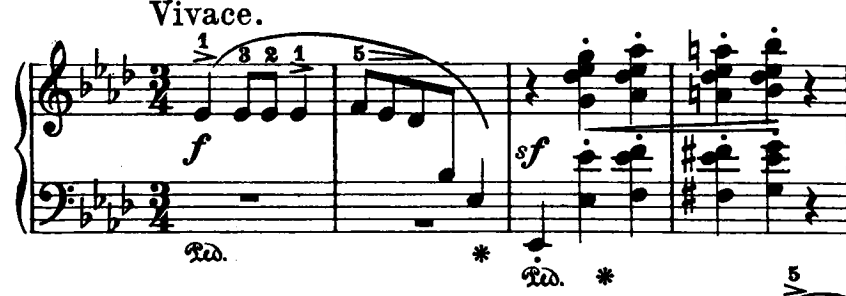
Opening of the waltz

Waltz in A♭ major, Op. 34 No. 1

Being among the longest of Chopin's waltzes, this waltz is in A♭ major. The piece is introduced with a fanfare before modulating to D♭ major for a dreamy middle section. The A♭ material is succeeded by a coda, which leads to the end of the piece. This waltz was dedicated to Josefina von Thun-Hohenstein.

=== No. 2 in A minor ===
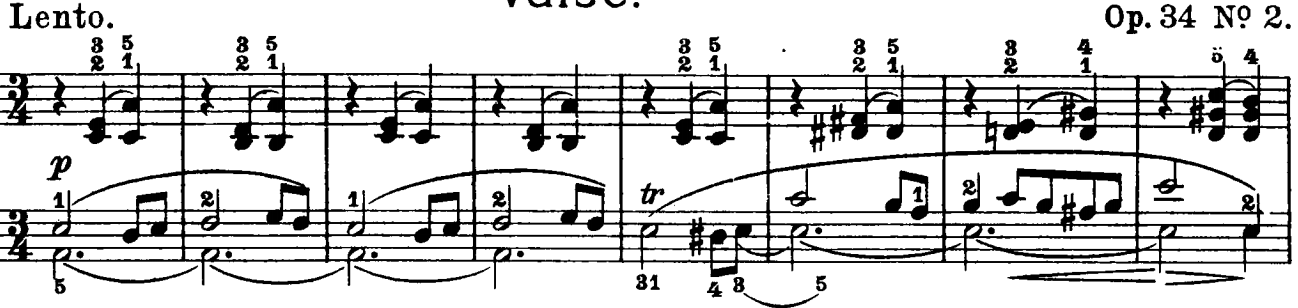
Opening of the waltz

Waltz in A minor, Op. 34 No. 2

This waltz is a sorrowful, slow waltz in A minor. Although it was the first to be written out of the three, the waltz was the second to be published. The Fryderyk Chopin Institute believes this piece was composed in 1831.

=== No. 3 in F major ===
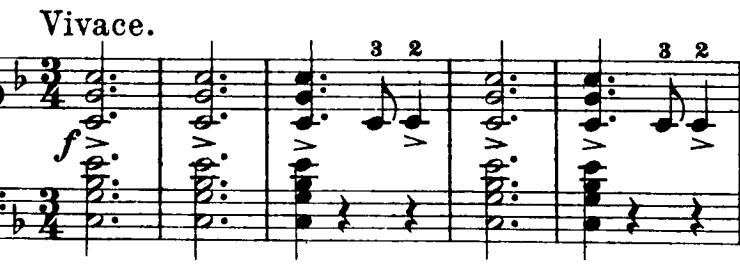
Opening of the waltz

Waltz in F major, Op. 34 No. 3

This waltz in F major, a typical Grande valse brillante, was composed in 1838 and published in the same year. This waltz is sometimes called the "cat's waltz."

== See also ==
- Waltzes (Chopin)
- List of compositions by Frédéric Chopin by genre
- List of compositions by Frédéric Chopin by opus number
