= Mazurkas, Op. 50 (Chopin) =

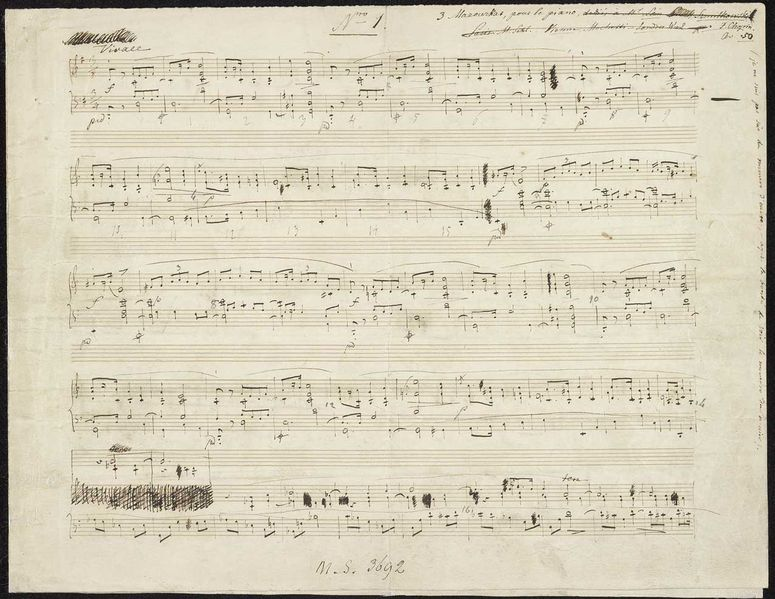
First page of music

The Op. 50 mazurkas by Frédéric Chopin are a set of three mazurkas written and published in 1842.

No. 1 in G major

No. 2 in A♭ major

No. 3 in C♯ minor
Performed by Xuan He

A typical performance of all three mazurkas takes about eleven minutes.

- No. 1 in G major
- No. 2 in A♭ major
- No. 3 in C♯ minor
