= Grande valse brillante in E-flat major (Chopin) =

1834 solo piano work by Frédéric Chopin

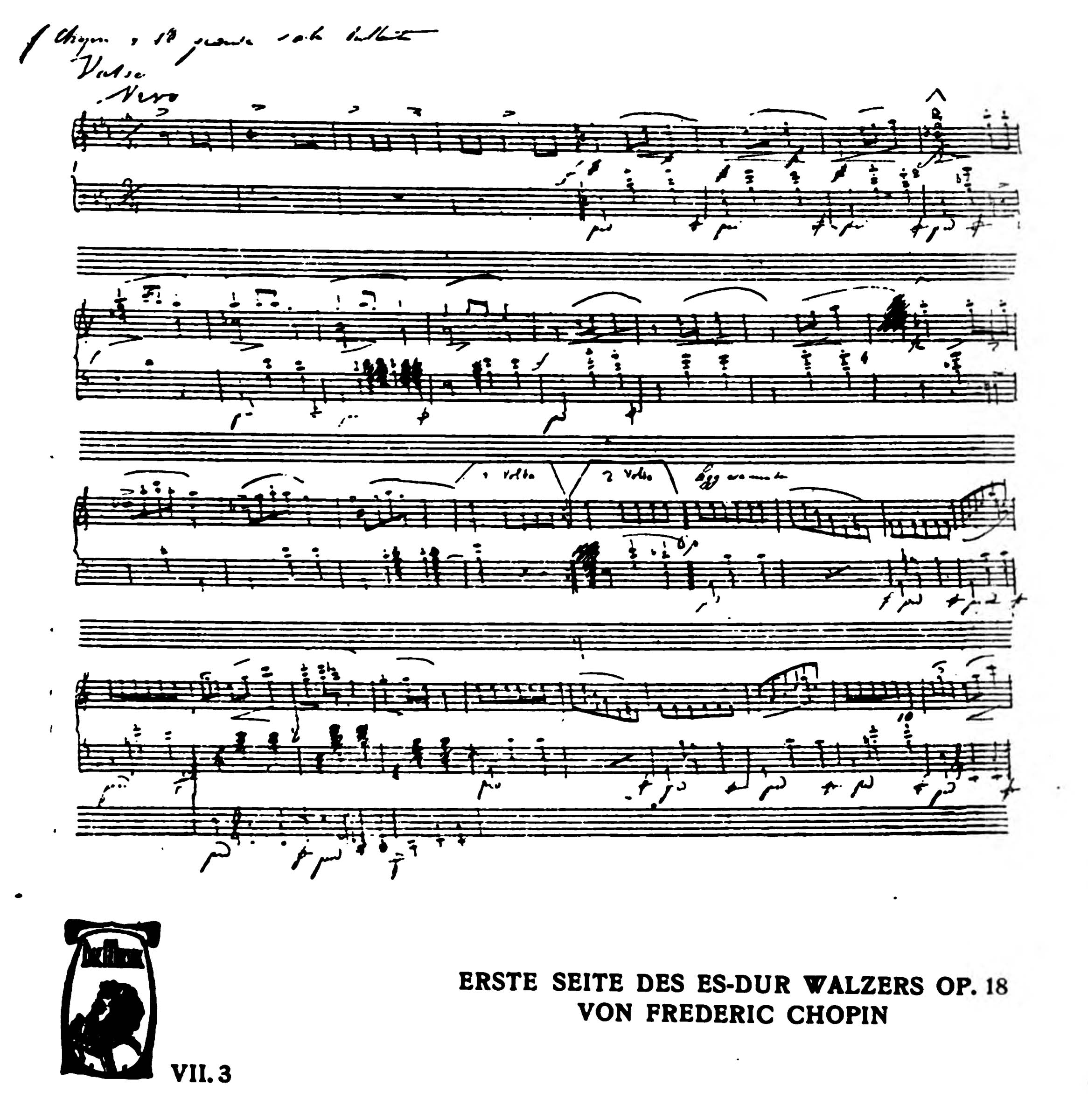
First manuscript page of Opus 18

Grande valse brillante, Op. 18
Performed by Olga Gurevich

The Grande valse brillante in E♭ major, Op. 18, was composed by Frédéric Chopin in 1833 and published in 1834. Chopin dedicated it to his pupil, Laura Horsford. This was his first published waltz composition for solo piano, although prior to 1834 he had written at least sixteen waltzes that were either destroyed or eventually published posthumously.

Chopin also gave the title Grande valse brillante to the next three waltzes in the Op. 34 set, published in 1838.

In 1909, Russian composer Igor Stravinsky made an orchestral arrangement of this waltz for Sergei Diaghilev's 1909 ballet Les Sylphides. Other composers who orchestrated this waltz for that ballet are Alexander Gretchaninov, Gordon Jacob, Roy Douglas, and Benjamin Britten.
