= Józef Michał Chomiński =

Polish musicologist

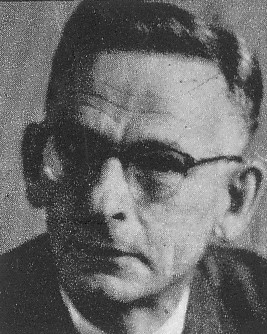
Józef Michał Chomiński

Józef Michał Chomiński (24 August 1906 – 20 February 1994) was a Polish musicologist of Ukrainian origin.

He studied composition and conducting at Lviv Conservatory and musicology at John Casimir University in Lviv under Adolf Chybiński. From 1949 he taught in the School (later became an Institute) of Musicology of Warsaw University. From 1951 to 1968, he also worked at the State Institute of Art which became the Institute of Art of the Polish Academy of Sciences in since 1959. He trained several generations of Polish musicologists.

From 1956 to 1971 he was editor-in-chief of the quarterly Muzyka. His impressive scholarly output covers works on music history from the Middle Ages to contemporary times. Among his publications (partly with his wife, Krystyna Wilkowska-Chomińska) are the monumental Musical forms (Formy muzyczne) in 5 volumes published in Kraków between 1954 and 84, History of harmony and counterpoint (Historia harmonii i kontrapunktu) in 3 volumes (1958-1990) and History of music (Historia muzyki powszechnej) in 2 volumes (1989–90). He also authored several books on music theory and the history of Polish music, and is known for the development of the theory of sonology.

Chomiński's Chopinological works are characterised by an holistic treatment of the musical work, typical of this scholar, involving such aspects as the analysis of texture and colouring, often overlooked in earlier musicological research, and the examination of interdependencies between the various elements in a work. In his first published book on Chopin's music, employing his own creatively modified version of the Erpf-Riemann method, he carried out an analysis of the Preludes, demonstrating the cyclical character of Op. 28 and drawing attention to such aspects as the common motivic material integrating the work. In his monograph of the Chopin sonatas, he defended the C minor Sonata, pointing out its logical construction and unity of expression, characteristic of Chopin's sonatas, and also the Cello Sonata, which he regarded as an important stage in the later development of this form. Taking issue with Hugo Leichtentritt, among others, he also saw the Funeral March as a key to the interpretation of the B flat minor Sonata. In other studies, he dealt with texture and harmony in Chopin (showing their mutual influence) and the problem of the periodisation of his oeuvre. He made use of these studies in his book on Chopin, which represents a more popular and synthesising approach to the composer's life and work.
