= Krystyna Kobylańska =

Polish musicologist

Krystyna Kobylańska (6 August 1925 in Brześć, Poland – 30 January 2009 in Milanówek, Poland) was a Polish musicologist, and former curator of the Fryderyk Chopin Society Museum in Warsaw.

In 1977 (revised and translated to German in 1979), she authored Frédéric Chopin: Thematisch-bibliographisches Werkverzeichnis (known as Kobylańska Katalog or KK), a complete and definitive thematic catalogue of all the musical works by Frédéric Chopin.
