= Minute Waltz =

1847 waltz for piano by Frédéric Chopin

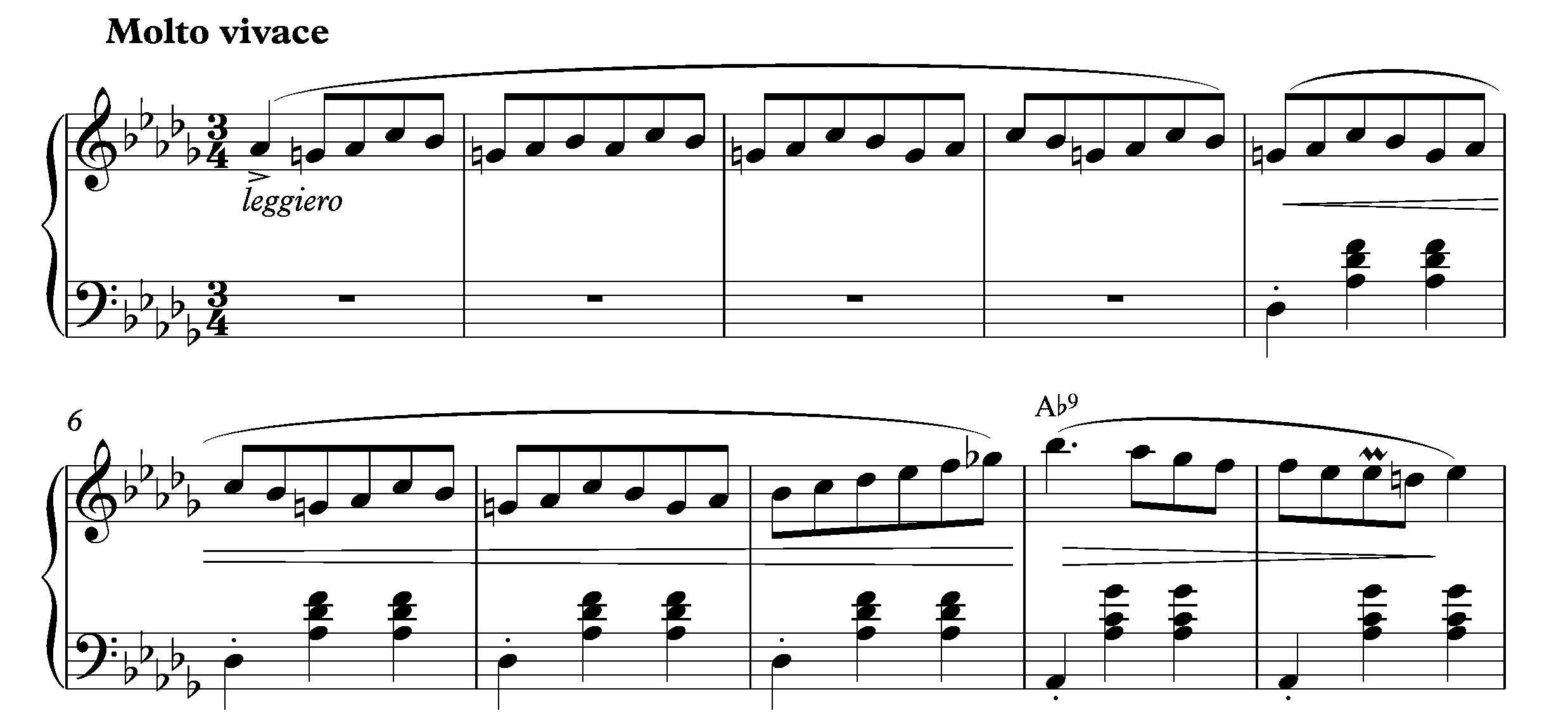
Opening of the "Minute Waltz"

The Waltz in D♭ major, Op. 64, No. 1, sometimes known as "Valse du petit chien" (French for "Waltz of the puppy"), and popularly known in English as the Minute Waltz, is a piano waltz by Polish composer and virtuoso Frédéric Chopin. It is dedicated to the Countess Delfina Potocka.

== History ==
Chopin composed the waltz in 1847 and had it published by Breitkopf & Härtel in Leipzig the same year, as the first of the Trois Valses, Op. 64. The second waltz is in the enharmonic parallel minor key of C♯ minor.

A fast version of the waltz, played by Arthur Rubinstein, has served as the theme music for the BBC Radio 4 show Just a Minute since the programme's inception.

== Structure ==
"Minute Waltz"
Performed by Muriel Nguyen Xuan

The waltz is in the key of D♭ major and has a tempo marking of molto vivace (very lively). Chopin indicates that the waltz is to be played with the sustain pedal used, and makes frequent use of crescendi and diminuendi. It is in a simple ternary form, as are many of Chopin's compositions. The A section is marked leggero, and the B section sostenuto. The A section itself can be divided into two themes, separated by a double barline. The first consists of the familiar opening melody over standard waltz accompaniment, frequently rising an octave only to drop back down. The second theme is similar, but not identical, and features several broken scales over several octaves between a repeated quarter note and triplet motive. The B section is somewhat calmer, using alternating half and quarter notes over waltz accompaniment. Following a lengthy trill, the A section is repeated, modified only in the ending, which features a three-octave descent instead of a two-octave one.

== Tempo ==
The piece is given the tempo marking Molto vivace. Although it has long been known as the "Minute" Waltz, its nickname was intended to mean "small" in the sense of a "miniature" waltz, given by its publisher. Chopin did not intend for this waltz to be played in one minute. A typical performance of the work will last between 1 1/2 and 2 1/2 minutes. The waltz is 140 measures long with one fifteen-measure repeat included, and thus it would have to be played at almost 420 quarter notes per minute in order to play it completely within a single minute. Playing the piece as fast as possible is still a feat some pianists attempt. Camille Bourniquel, one of Chopin's biographers, reminds the reader that Chopin got the inspiration for this waltz as he was watching a small dog chase its tail, which prompted the composer to name the piece Valse du petit chien, meaning "The Little Dog Waltz".

== Derivative works ==
A vocal version of the piece, with lyrics by screenwriter Lan O'Kun, has been performed by multiple artists, including Barbra Streisand on her 1966 album Color Me Barbra, her version peaked at #23 in the Billboard's Easy Listening chart. O'Kun's lyrics perpetuate the notion that the tune should be performed in one minute, although Streisand's performance clocks in at just under two minutes. Because the lower notes were hard to reach, Streisand finished up the ending phrases in a spoken voice. This version was also performed by a female Muppet on the 1969–70 premiere season of Sesame Street. That same version was also used for a skit on Captain Kangaroo in the 1970s.

New Orleans rhythm and blues pianist James Booker included an instrumental version on his album Junco Partner (1976).

The composers Kaikhosru Shapurji Sorabji, Rafael Joseffy, Max Reger, Leopold Godowsky, Jeannot Heinen, Moriz Rosenthal, Giuseppe Ferrata, Sam Raphling, Marc-André Hamelin, and Bertold Hummel created paraphrases of the "Minute Waltz".
