= Waltz in A-flat major, Op. 64, No. 3 (Chopin) =

Composition by Frédéric Chopin

Waltz in A♭ major
Performed by Veronica van der Knaap

The Waltz in A♭ major, Op. 64, No. 3, composed by Frédéric Chopin, is the final waltz by Chopin that was published in his lifetime. It was dedicated to Countess Katarzyna Branicka. The waltz is in A♭ major and features a central section in C major.
