= Maurice J. E. Brown =

British musicologist

Maurice John Edwin Brown (3 August 1906 – 27 August 1975) was a British musicologist and a noted authority on Franz Schubert.

Brown was born in London and attended the University of London from 1927 to 1929, where he studied physics. He taught for some years as a music master before his war service in RAF telecommunications. From 1945 until his retirement in 1966 he was head of science at the Marlborough Royal Free Grammar School, where he also encouraged the school orchestra, in which he played violin.

Brown's book Schubert: A Critical Biography (1958) became the standard work on the composer for many years, establishing him as an international authority. According to William Mann, the pianist Paul Badura-Skoda declared him to be the world's greatest authority on Schubert. His identification of manuscripts in the Otto Taussig collection at Lund University led to the first publication of Schubert's String Quartet No 2 in C Major. Brown was particularly interested in the lied tradition, also becoming an authority on Emilie Zumsteeg and Carl Loewe. He also produced the standard thematic catalogue of Chopin's music.

Illness affected his work towards the end of his life and a planned book on Schubert's operas remained unfinished. One of the last pieces he wrote was the Schubert biography for the New Grove Dictionary of Music (1980), published posthumously in the dictionary and later also in book form, with worklists and revisions by his friend Eric Sams. He died of a heart attack in Marlborough. His papers, including 750 letters from his close friend and fellow Schubert researcher Otto Erich Deutsch, are now at the Schubert Institute Research Centre (SIRC), University of Leeds.

== Books ==
- Schubert's Variations (1954)
- Schubert: A Critical Biography (1958, German translation 1969)
- Chopin: An Index of His Works in Chronological Order (1960, 2nd ed. 1972)
- Essays On Schubert (1966)
- (with Otto Deutsch), Schubert: Die Erinnerungen seiner Freunde (Leipzig, 1966)
- Schubert Symphonies (BBC Music Guides, 1970)
- Schubert Songs (BBC Music Guides, 1972)
- The New Grove Schubert, The Composer Biography Series, in Stanley Sadie (Editor), The New Grove Dictionary of Music and Musicians, Macmillan, London, 1982. Book of 211 pages (17 biographical and musicological chapters rewritten by Maurice Brown in the mid-1970s and first printed in 1980, with complete catalog of Schubertian works by Eric Sams p. 100-198 and final bibliography too). Subsequent edition, W W Norton, New-York, 1983, 186 pages. ISBN 9780393315868
