= Remi-Fursy Descarsin =

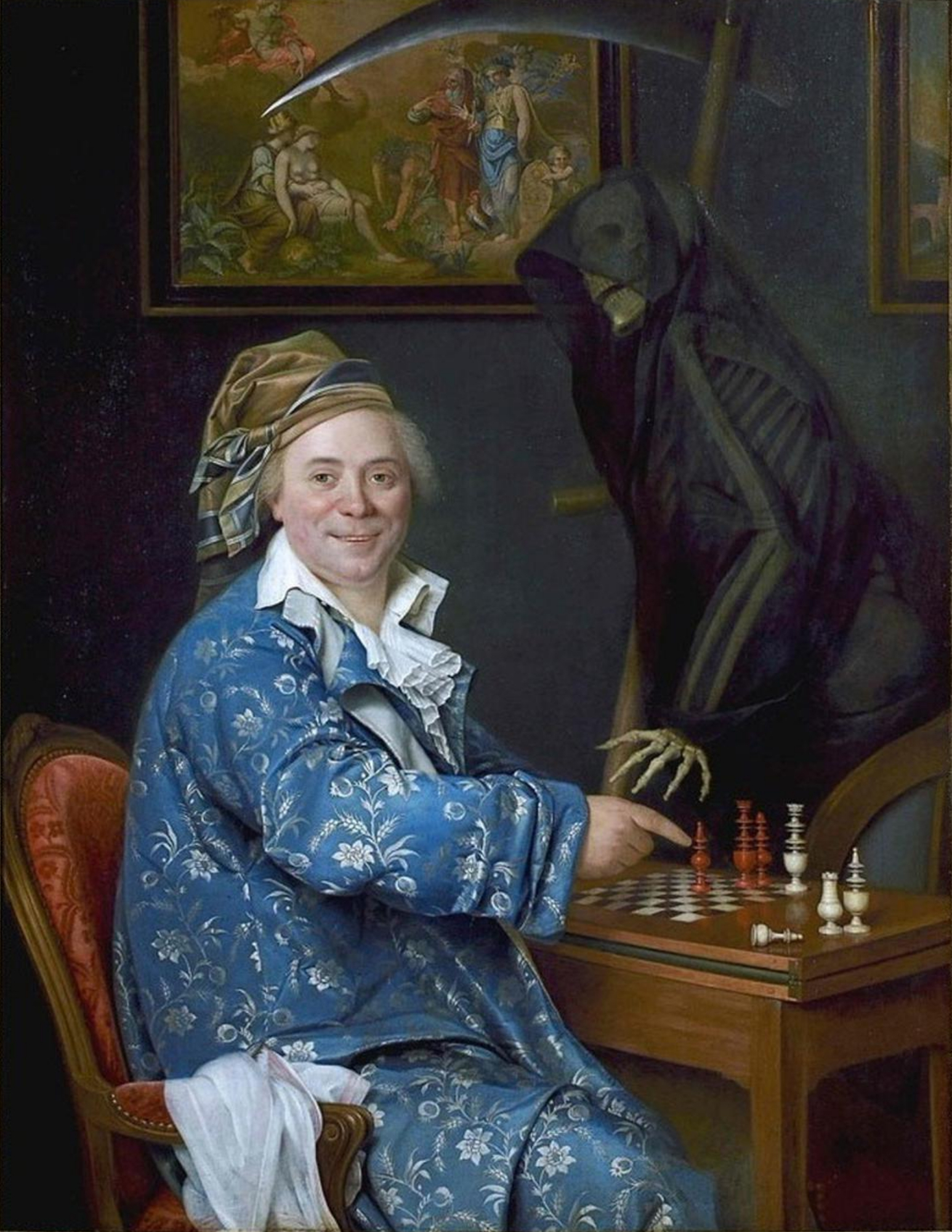
Portrait of Dr. du C. after saving a patient while Death, surprised, admits defeat

Remi-Fursy Descarsin, René-Rémi Fursy Descarsin, also spelled as Remi-Furcy Descarsin (4 July 1747 – 14 November 1793) was a French painter and possibly, miniaturist. He is known for his realistic portrait paintings. He died at a young age as a victim during the phase of the French Revolution referred to as the Reign of Terror.

== Life ==
Descarsin was born on 4 July 1747 in Chauny, in the parish of Saint-Martin (Aisne), to Armand Descarsin, a lawyer and prosecutor of the King (avocat et procureur du roi) of the Bailiwick of Chauny and Royal Notary, and Barbe Desains. There is no firm information about his artistic training. He described himself as a student of the Académie royale de peinture et de sculpture (Royal Academy of Painting and Sculpture) in Paris when he sought admission to the Académie in 1789. It is unlikely, however, that he was ever formally a student at the Académie as his name does not appear in the Académie's register.

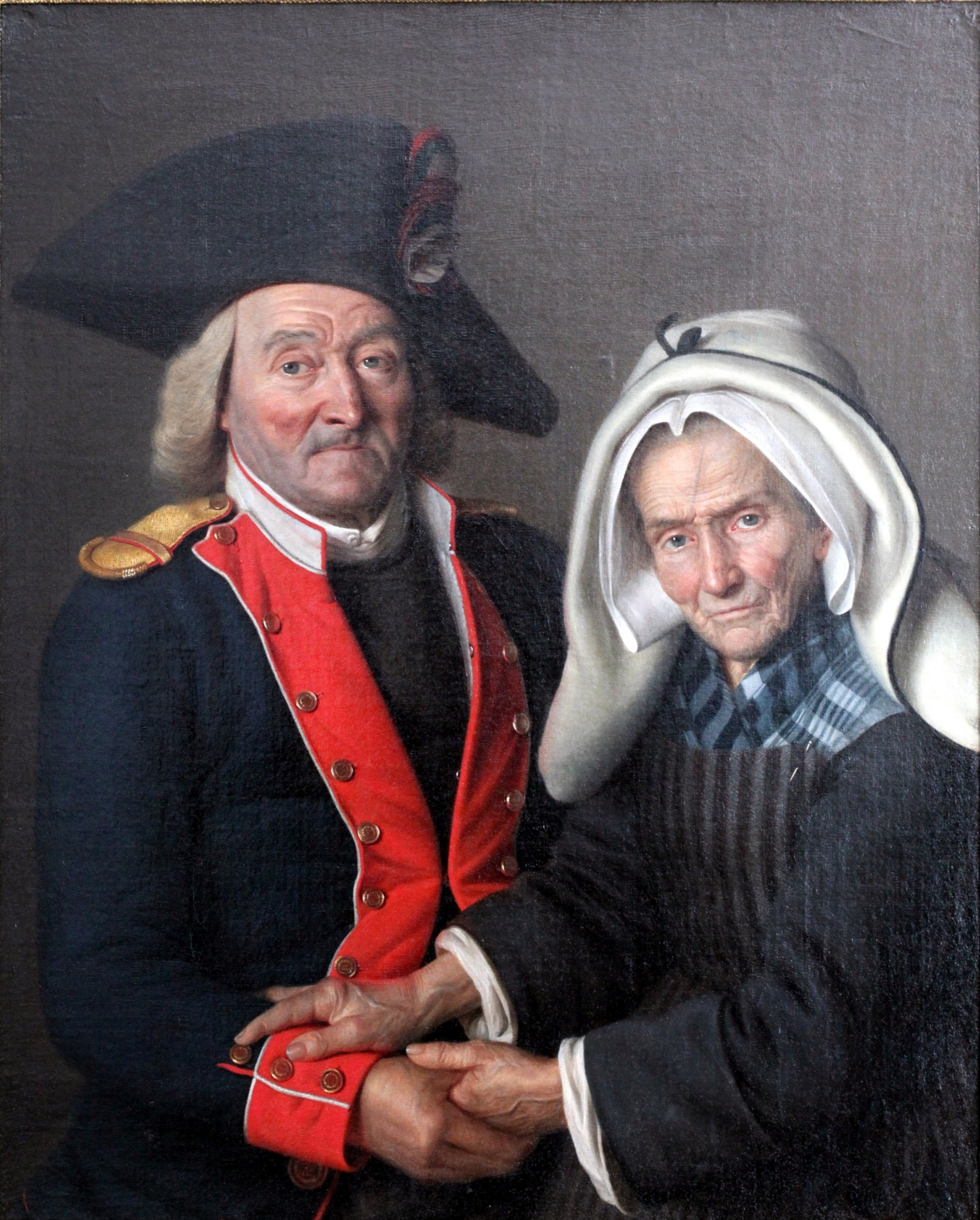
Portrait of an elderly guardsman and his wife

On 29 October 1770, he married a German woman named Marie-Ève Kaiger (Kaigre) in Noyon. His wife appears to have been uneducated. He must have moved to Paris after 1774. In 1783 his wife obtained in Paris a separation of goods from her husband in order to protect her assets from the erratic behaviour of her husband whom she described as a depressed and suicidal man suffering from an incurable skin disease. This suggests his wife must have possessed some independent fortune.

In Paris he came into contact with Pahin de La Blancherie, the founder of the Salon de la Correspondance, an association of artists and intellectuals who from 1778 to 1788 convened weekly at a location in Paris. At the weekly events attendees could participate in conferences and debates, listen to concerts and lectures and view exhibitions of scientific instruments, curiosities, sculptures and paintings. The participating artists were not members of the Académie and included Joseph Ducreux, Rose-Adélaïde Ducreux and Marie-Victoire Lemoine. Between 1783 and 1786, Descarsin exhibited various paintings at the Salon de la Correspondance. His daughters Caroline and Sophie were accomplished harp players and made in 1785 their debut at the Salon de la Correspondance when they were only 11 and 6 years old. The Salon ceased to exist in 1788 as a result of financial difficulties and the hostility of Charles Claude Flahaut, Count of Angiviller, the director of the Bâtiments du Roi, a position which put him in charge of the royal building works.

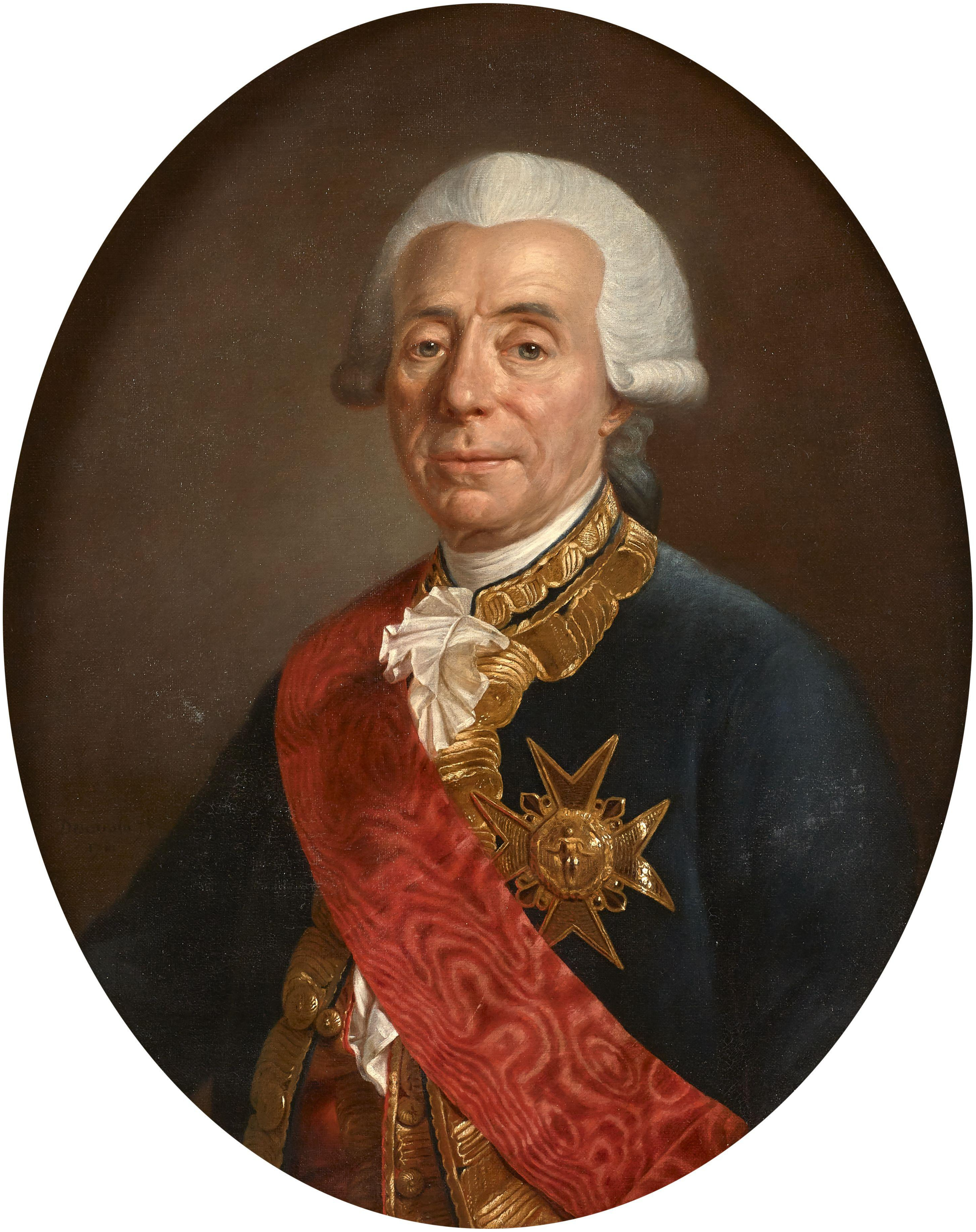
Portrait of Charles René Fourcroy de Ramecourt

The Count of Provence (also known as "Monsieur"), the brother of French king Louis XVI and future king Louis XVIII, was a supporter of the Salon de la Correspondance. It is not clear whether Descarsin came to the attention of the Count of Provence through the Salon. From 1782 to 1789 he received commissions from the Count of Provence. He painted multiple copies of portraits of the Count starting from 1783. The copies were handed out by the Count to his entourage, persons he met on his travels or any other person he wished to honour. In 1783, he painted a portrait of the Count of Provence in the costume of Grand Master of the combined orders of Saint-Lazare and Notre-Dame du Mont-Carmel, wearing the collars of these orders, the Order of the Golden Fleece and the Order of the Holy Spirit, after a portrait painting by François-Hubert Drouais.

While working for the Count of Provence, he also served a clientele of members of the highest nobility, knights of the Order of the Holy Spirit and the Order of Saint Lazarus and members of the Académie. He made in 1783 a portrait of marshal Anne Pierre d'Harcourt, up from his knees, in a command posture (1783, re-exhibited in 1785) and of the marshal's two sons. Descarsin arranged for copies of the paintings to be made to which he put the final touches so that the Marshal could distribute these to various persons. The portrait of the marshal was exhibited a few times at the Salon de la Correspondance. It was later presented, together with other portraits, to the royal family and displayed in the queen's rooms for viewing by the whole court and the public. He further painted portraits of prince Gabriel-Marie de Talleyrand-Périgord, the Marquesses d'Estampes and de Valançay, the Choiseul family and Charles Pierre Hyacinthe d'Ossun.

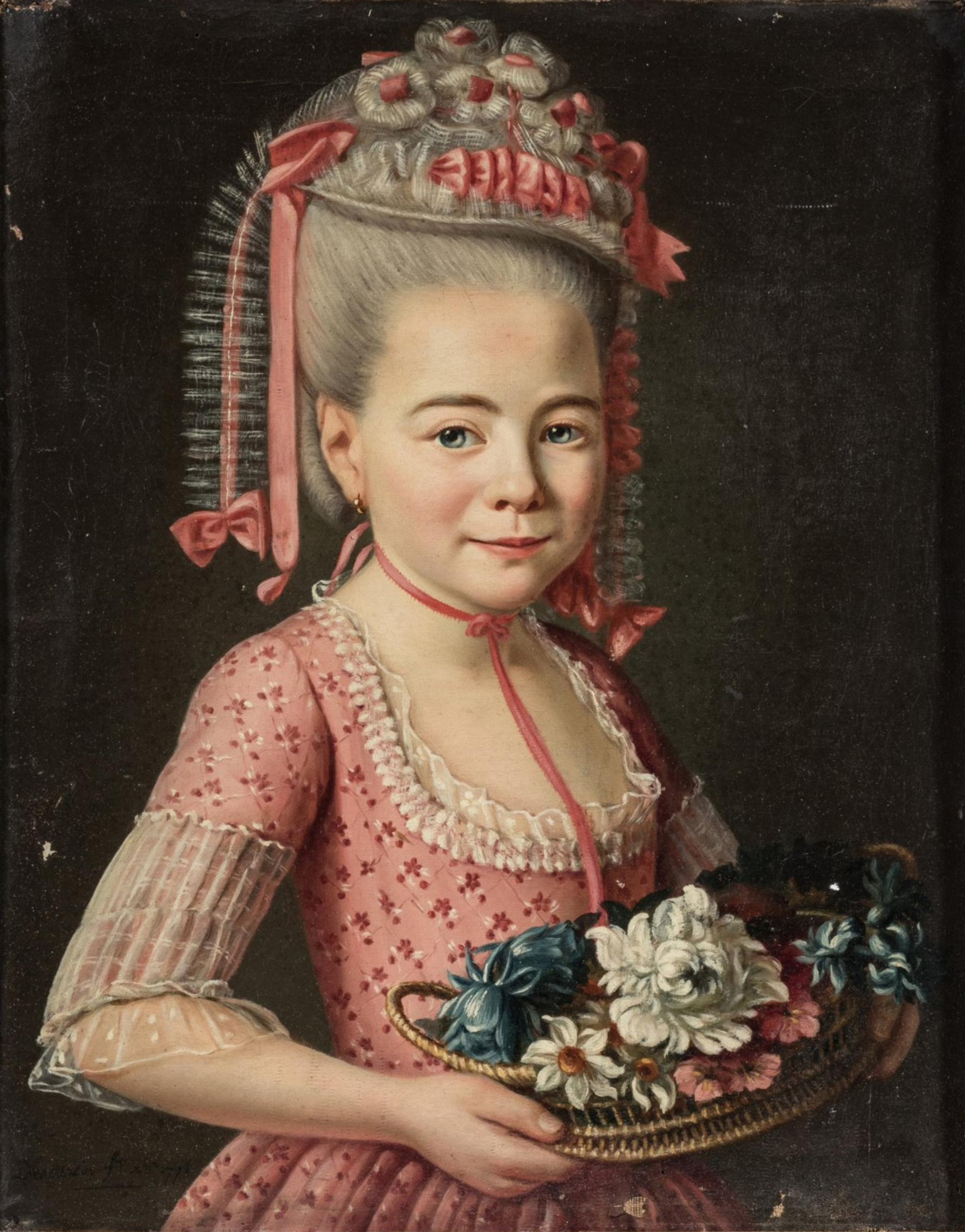
Young girl with a basket of flowers

Under Descarsin's direction, his talented daughters successfully staged harp concerts in Paris and provincial capitals such as Rouen and Bordeaux starting from February 1785. An entrance fee was payable to attend the concerts. During the concerts Descarsin also promoted his portrait paintings. He further used local media to advertise the concerts as well as his own artworks. In February 1789 the sister harpists played at a paid performance in Paris and on 25 March 1789 they played at the Concert Spirituel in Paris. Some composers dedicated works to the two sisters and poets composed poems about them. The sisters performed on occasion with leading musicians of their time such as the violinist Gervais and the cellist Jean-Louis Duport. The composer Louis-Charles Ragué dedicated his Trio for Violin, Cello and Harp to the eldest sister Caroline. The piece was first performed by Caroline, Gervais and Duport at the Concert Spirituel in Paris. The composer Francesco Petrini dedicated his Harp Concerto No.1 to Caroline. The piece was first performed by Caroline at the Concert Spirituel in Paris in 1786.

On 8 April 1788 a request was remitted on behalf of Descarsin to Cromot de Fougy, the superintendent of buildings and finances of the Count of Provence. In the request the artists applied for the certificate as painter of the Count, which, if granted, would allow him to identify himself publicly as the painter of the Count. The certificate was granted on 4 May 1788. On 25 April 1789, he submitted a self-portrait painting to the Académie royale de peinture et de sculpturein Paris in support of his application to become as a member. The Académie denied his application. The reason for the refusal may lay in the low opinion which Jean-Baptiste Marie Pierre, director of the Académie and first painter to the King, had formed of Descarsin's character in his role as the organiser of the very profitable concerts of his daughters.

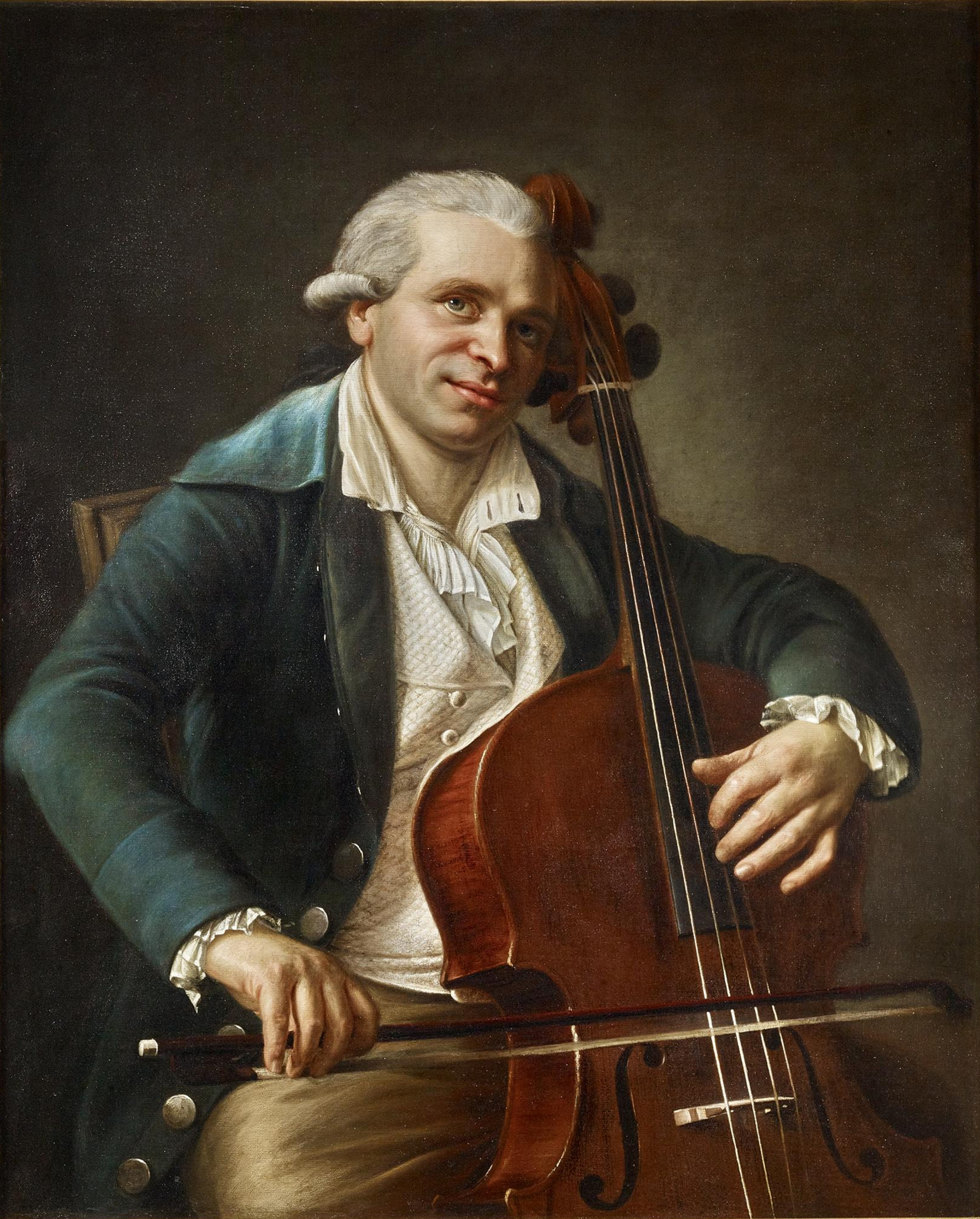
Portrait of the cellist Jean-Louis Duport

After the launch of the French Revolution, many French institutions were dissolved. The Concert Spirituel ceased in 1790. Descarsin joined the National Guard and arrived with his family in Nantes on 5 November 1789. He and his eldest daughter had to consult with medical doctors. Descarsin painted portraits of a few of these doctors. As a guard of the National Guard he also painted a double portrait of an elderly guardsman and his wife. He put out a public notice inviting the general public to visit his workshop to view the painting in person. He also organised further concerts of his daughters which were successful and again inspired the local poets to sing the praises of the young musicians.

In early 1792 he organised at his home another exhibition of portraits he had painted in Nantes. In April 1792 he went public to defend himself against rumors that he had not himself painted his self-portrait and the portrait of Charles Pierre Hyacinthe d'Ossun and that the colours of his paintings would fade after some time. In 1793 Jean-Jacques Gentet de la Chenelliere, a married nobleman of 40 years of age who had rented a room with his infant daughter in Descarsin's residence, seduced Descarsin's 19-year old daughter Caroline. After Descarsin evicted the nobleman from his home, an anonymous letter denouncing the Descarsin couple as anti-revolutionary and accomplices of the rebels of the Vendée contra-revolutionary insurrection was sent to the Revolution's representative on mission in Nantes, Pierre Philippeaux. After a search at Descarsin's home discovered nothing suspicious, Descarsin was able to identify the anonymous letter writer as his evicted lodger Gentet de la Chenelliere who was subsequently locked up. The Descarsin family was initially left to pursue its life. This changed on 23 October 1793 when the Descarsin couple were arrested and locked up in separate prisons on orders of the local Revolutionary Committee. He was after a while transferred to a prison on a boat where the conditions were very bad. His eldest daughter made great efforts to obtain his liberation on medical grounds. Descarsin tried to smuggle some letters out of prison in which he denounced the members of the Revolutionary Committee and threatened their lives should he be freed. After the letters were intercepted, the rest of his family (i.e. his daughters and young son) was also arrested. He commenced drafting a letter to one of the judges on the Revolutionary Committee. The letter remained unfinished. He was condemned to death by the Revolutionary Committee as a contra-revolutionary and instigator of the rebels on 14 November 1793 and was guillotined at 3 in the afternoon of the same day. His family members were later released from their detentions.

== Work ==
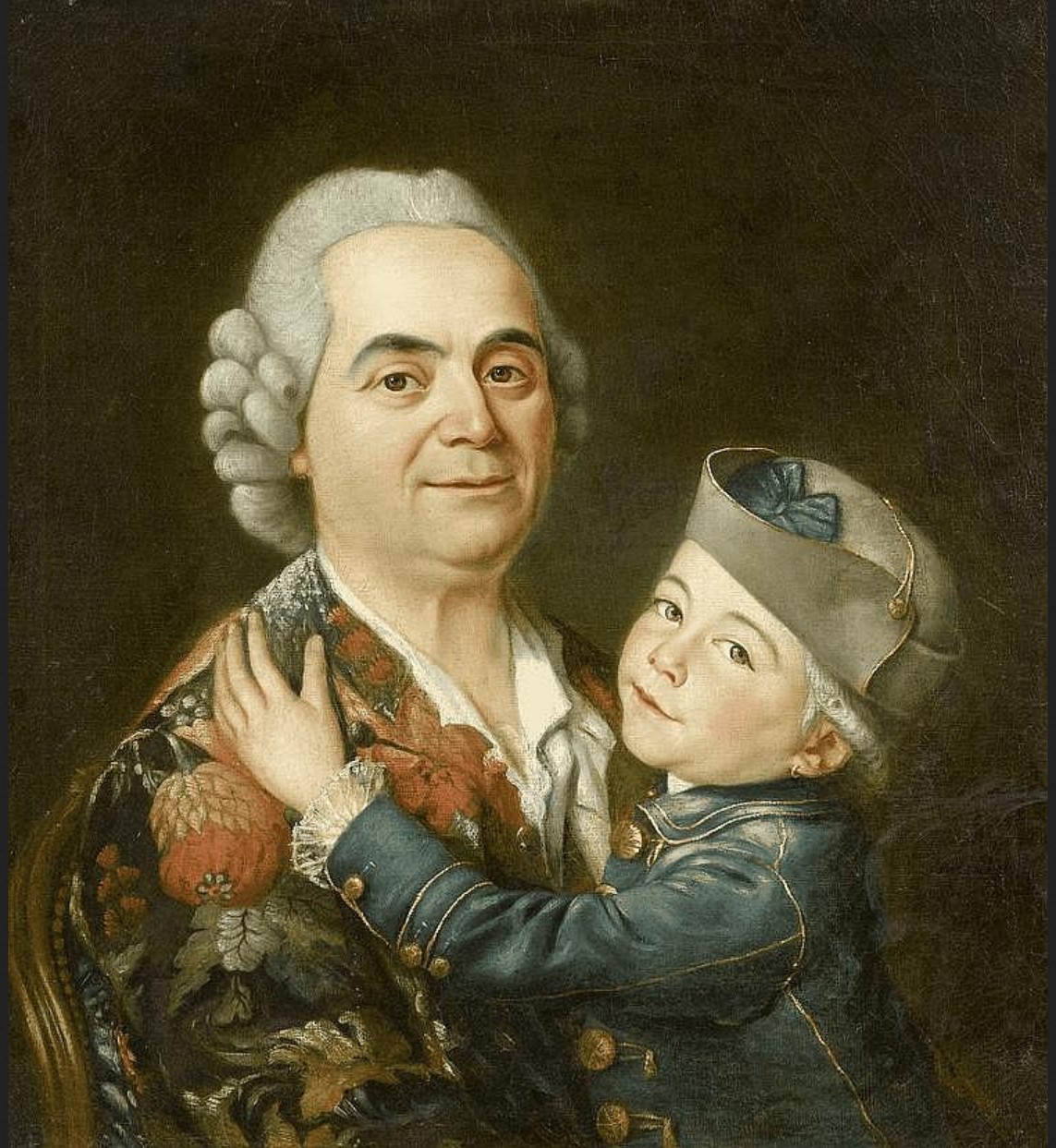
Father with his son

Pierre-Yves Badel identified in 2011 22 or 23 works by Descarsin, the location of some was unknown. Some of them have come on the art market since, such as the Young girl with a basket of flowers. He was a specialist portrait painter working in oil. It is not clear whether he worked also in pastel, which was popular at the time. His portraits usually depict the sitter at half-length or seated, although a few full standing portraits are known.

Descarsin's oldest known painting is Father with his son dated 1771. He tried to innovate the art of portraiture by adding allegorical elements such as in the Portrait of Dr. du C. after saving a patient while Death, surprised, admits defeat. It depicts a doctor seated in his room, wearing a nightcap and robe, looking with a triumphant smile at the viewer and pointing to a chessboard. On the other side of the chessboard, Death in the form of a skeleton veiled by a transparent cloth, rises from his armchair, making a gesture of spite with his left hand. The doctor apparently just defeated a mortal disease of one of his patients. The sitter for the portrait was Henry Ducommun, the family doctor of the Descarsins who had accepted to receive the portrait in return for the services he provided to the family.
