= Eugène Sauzay =

French violinist and composer (1809–1901)

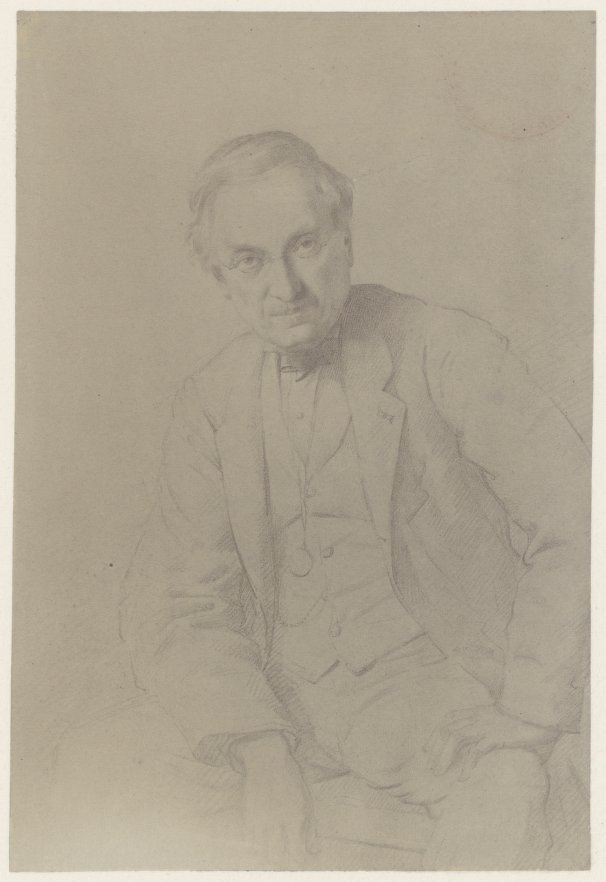
Eugène Sauzay, drawing, c.1900

Charles Eugène Sauzay (14 July 1809 – 24 January 1901) was a French violinist and composer.

== Life ==
Sauzay was born in Paris in 1809, and in 1823 he began studying at the Paris Conservatoire. During his time there, he was a pupil of the violinist Pierre Baillot and Anton Reicha. He won several prizes and went on to become a member of Baillot's string quartet. He also married Baillot's daughter.

After the dissolution of Baillot's quartet in 1840, he formed a chamber music group with his wife, Louis-Pierre Norblin, Auguste Franchomme and Alexandre Pierre François Boëly, which gave concerts in the Salle Pleyel in Paris.

In 1840 he became first violinist to Louis Philippe I, and later leader of the second violins to emperor Napoleon III. In 1860 he was appointed professor of the violin at the Conservatoire.

== Works ==
His works include violin studies; a string trio; and incidental music for the plays George Dandin and Le Sicilien by Molière, in the style of Lully, suitable for the period of the plays.

Apart from his musical compositions, he wrote a study of the string quartets of Haydn, Mozart and Beethoven, which was published in 1861.

Orchestral

- Symphonie rustique, Op. 12 (1860); also for piano 4-hands

Chamber music

- Fantaisie sur Zampa for violin and piano, Op. 1
- Allegro et rondo for violin and piano, Op. 2 (published c.1835)
- Sweet Home, Air irlandais varié for violin and piano, Op. 3
- 5 Pièces for violin and piano, Op. 6
- Pièce en trio in G major for violin, viola and piano, Op. 7 (published 1855)
- Trio in G major for violin, viola and cello, Op. 8 (1846)
- Romance for violin or cello and piano, Op. 8bis (1847)
- Andante from Sérénade for violin and piano, Op. 10 (published 1854)
- Primavera!, Romance for violin and piano, Op. 12 (published 1886)
- Études harmoniques for violin with accompaniment of a second violin (ad libitum), Op. 14 (1864)
- Les Deux modes, 24 exercices sur l'emploi du majeur et du mineur pour le violon, Op. posthumus (published 1911)

Piano

- 3 Pièces for piano 4-hands, Op. 9
- Symphonie rustique for piano 4-hands, Op. 12 (1860); original for orchestra

Vocal

- 3 Romances sur des paroles de Ronsard for voice and piano, Op. 4 (published 1843, 1845); words by Pierre de Ronsard

1. Mignonne!
2. Chansonnette (Bel Aubespin!)
3. Imitation d'Anacréon

- 3 Anciennes chansons for voice and piano, Op. 9 (published 1854); words by François de Malherbe, Molière and Philippe Desportes

1. Chanson de Malherbe
2. Chanson de Molière tirée du "Sicilien ou l'amour peintre"
3. Villanelle de Philippe Desportes

- 3 Anciennes chansons for voice and piano, Op. 11 (published 1855); words by Margaret of Valois, Clément Marot and Charles, Duke of Orléans

1. Chanson de Marguerite de Valois
2. Huitain de Clément Marot
3. Le Printemps! Rondel du duc Charles d'Orléans

- 3 Romances sur des parole d'Alfred de Musset for voice and piano (published 1877); words by Alfred de Musset

1. Bonjour Suzon!
2. Sonnet d'Arvers
3. Fleurette!

- Chanson ancienne: Dieu! qu'il la fait bon regarder for voice, violin and piano (published 1886); words by Charles, Duke of Orléans
- Chant d'un vanneur de blé aux vents, Jeux rustiques for voice and piano (published 1897); words by Joachim du Bellay

Choral

- Fragmens des chœurs d'Athalie et d'Esther de Racine for female chorus and piano, Op. 5

Literary

- Haydn, Mozart, Beethoven. Étude sur le quatuor (1861)
- L'école de l'accompagnement, ouvrage faisant suite à l'Étude sur le quatuor (1869)
- Le Violon harmonique, ses ressources, son emploi dans les écoles anciennes et modernes. Étude complétée par un cours d'harmonie à l'usage des violonistes (1889)
