= Jean-Baptiste Bréval =

French cellist and composer

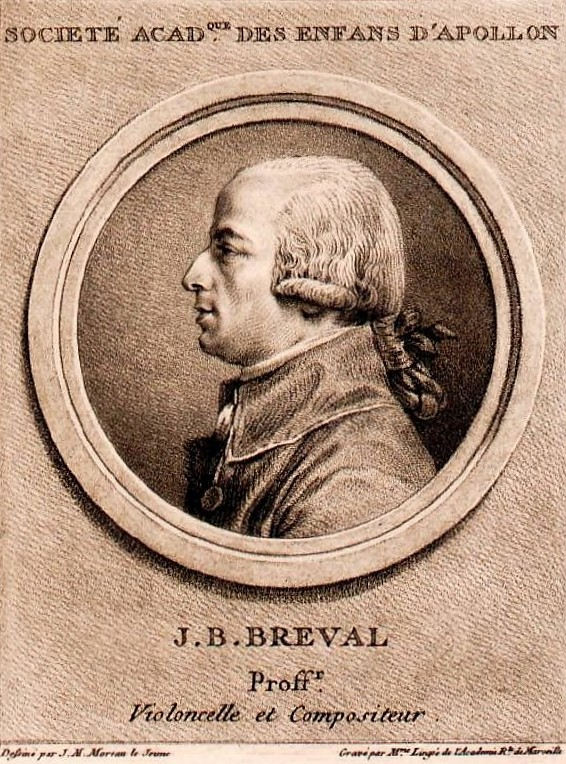
Jean-Baptiste Bréval, ca. 1790, Bibliothèque nationale de France.

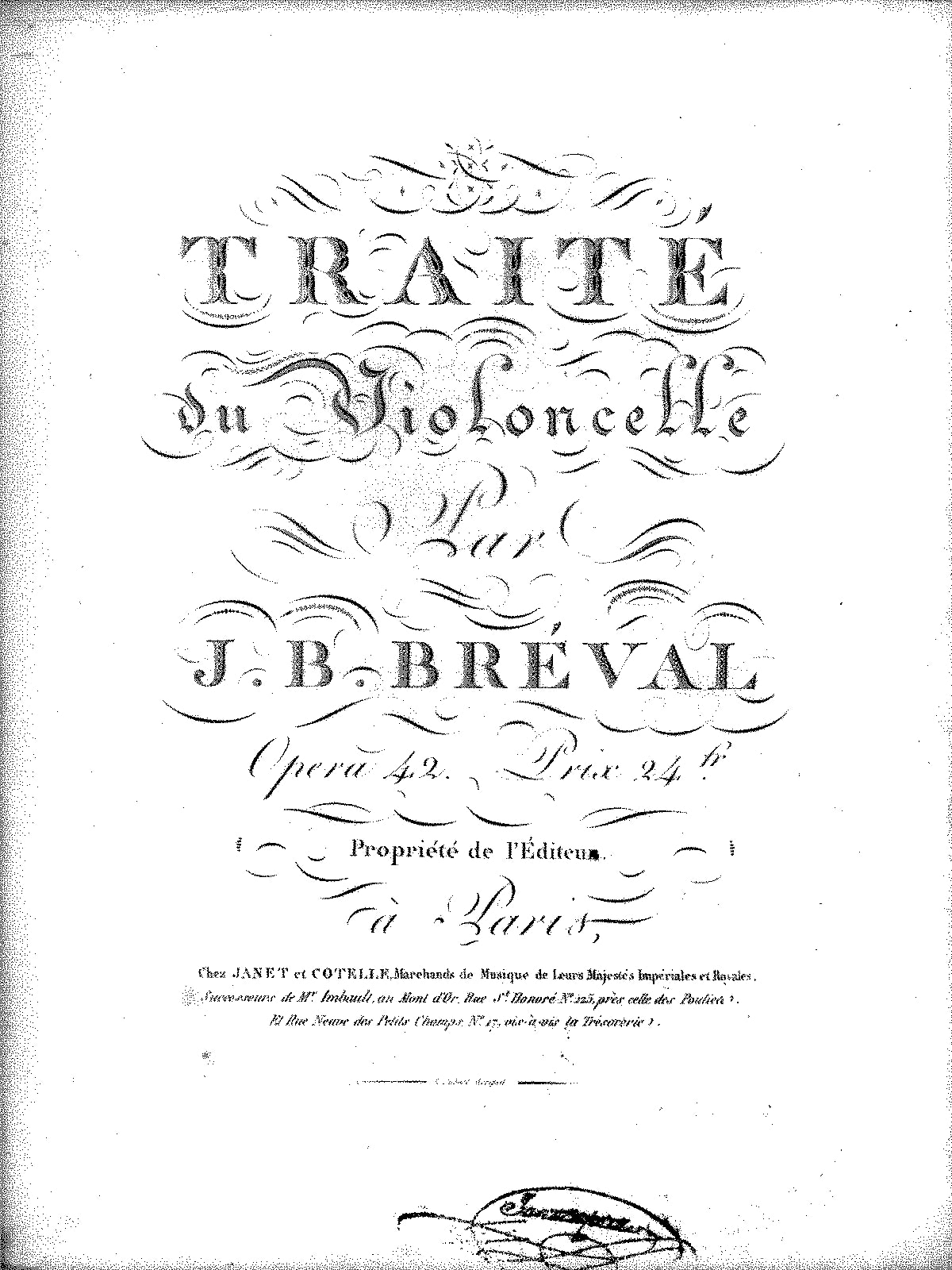
Title page of Bréval's 1804 violoncello treatise in French Traité du violoncelle.

Jean-Baptiste Sebastien Bréval (6 November 1753 – 18 March 1823) was a French cellist and composer. He wrote mostly for his own instrument, including pedagogical works as well as virtuoso display pieces.

== Life ==
Bréval was born in Paris, and went on to study with François Cupis (1735-1810) and Martin Berteau. By 1774, he was an active cello teacher. In 1775, he published his opus 1, six concertante quartets. In 1776, he became a member of the «Société Académique des Enfants d'Apollon». Kicking off his career by performing one of his sonatas at a Concert Spirituel in 1778, he became a member of their orchestra from 1781 to 1791, and from 1791 to 1800 he played in the orchestra of the Théâtre Feydeau.

Later he became involved in the administration of the «Concerts de la rue de Cléry» and a member of the Paris Opera orchestra. He retired from the orchestra in 1816. The Allgemeine musikalische Zeitung states that Bréval taught at the Conservatoire although this can not be verified by Conservatoire documents. However, Bréval's compositions were definitely used for instruction at the Conservatoire. Bréval died in Colligis, Aisne.

== Compositions ==
Bréval compositions written between 1775 and 1805 consisted mostly of instrumental pieces. His music reflected the Parisian love for graceful melodies and energetic rhythms. Before 1784 his works were usually two or three movement compositions employing sonata and rondo form, or a one movement work using variations. His later works, such as Symphonie concertante for clarinet, horn and bassoon, Op. 38 (c. 1795), show diversity and experimentation. His concertos, written for his own performance, were influenced by Giovanni Battista Viotti who utilized a precise thematic organization interjected with virtuosic passages.

Bréval is most well known for his Sonata in C major Op. 40, No. 1, which is one of the classics of student cello literature, and often one of the first full sonatas a cello student will learn. The original version is available from several different publishers. Versions have also been published transcribed for other string instruments, including the viola, and for bass clarinet.

Perhaps his most important and influential work was Traité du Violoncelle (1804), a cello method. It was probably the first systematic treatise on the cello. Ill-reviewed in the Correspondance des amateurs musiciens, it overlooked technical advances in the design of the cello that allowed for greater virtuosity on the instrument and was overshadowed by Jean-Louis Duport's 1806 Essai.

=== Orchestral ===
Symphonies concertantes (only solo instruments listed):

- 2 as Op. 4 (1777), No. 1, 2 violins, viola obbl, cello in Andante, No. 2, 2 violins, cello obbl;
- 2 as Op. 11 (1783), No. 1, No. 2, 2 violin, cello;
- 1 as Op. 30, oboe, horn (c1789), lost;
- 1 as Op. 31, flute, bassoon (c1790), ?arr. by Devienne of Op. 30;
- 1 as Op. 33, violin, viola (c1792), lost;
- 1 as Op. 38, clarinet, horn, bassoon (c1795);
- 1 for violin, cello, perf. Paris, Concert Spirituel, 1787;
- 1 for 2 cello, performance Paris Conservatoire, 1800

Cello Concertos:

- No. 1, G, Op. 14 (1784);
- No. 2, D, Op. 17 (1784);
- No. 3, F, Op. 20 (1785);
- No. 4, C, Op. 22 (1786);
- No. 5, Op. 24 (1786);
- No. 6, C, Op. 26 (1786);

=== Chamber ===
Quartets:

- 6 quatuors concertants, 2 violin, viola, bass, Op. 1 (1775);
- 6 quatuors concertants et dialogués, violin/flute, violin, viola, bass, Op. 5 (1778);
- 6 quatuors concertants et dialogués, 2 violins, viola, bass, Op. 7 (1781);
- 6 quatuors concertants et dialogués, 2 violins, viola, bass, Op. 18 (1785);
- Quatuors in dis, bassoon, viola, cello, doublebass, CZ-Pnm

Trios:

- 6 trios concertants et dialogués, violin, viola, cello, Op. 3 (1777);
- 6 for (flute, violin, cello)/(2 violins, bass), Op. 8 (1782);
- 6 trio ... concertants et dialogués, violin, viola, cello, Op. 27 (c1786), ? 3 as Op. 32 (London, n.d.);
- 3 for violin, cello obbl, doublebass, Op. 39 (c1795)

Duets:

- 1 violins: 6 as Op. 6 (1780), arr. 2 violins/violin, cello (London, n.d.);
- 6 as Op. 10 (1783), arr. 2 violins/violin, cello (London, n.d.);
- 6 for 2 violins/violin, cello, Op. 19 (1785);
- 6 for 2 violins/violin, cello, Op. 23 (1786), lost, arr. 2 violins/violin, cello (London, n.d.);
- 6 as Op. 29 (c1783), lost; 6 as Op. 32 (c1791);
- 6 as Op. 34 (c1794), ?lost, arr. 2 violins/(violin, cello)/2 cello as Op. 35 (London, n.d.);
- 6 as Op. 37 (c1795), lost;
- 6 duos concertantes, 2 violins/violin, cello, Op. 41 (c1798), nos.3, 5, 6 as duets (London, n.d.)

Other duets:

- 6 for 2 cellos, Op. 2 (1783);
- 6 for violin, viola, Op. 15 (1784);
- 6 for 2 flutes, Op. 16 (1784);
- 6 duos faciles, violin, cello/bn, Op. 21 (1785), ? also as 6 duos, violin, cello, Op. 1 (Berlin, n.d.);
- 6 duos … pour faciliter l’étude des différentes clefs, 2 cellos, Op. 25 (1786)

Sonatas:

- Cello, b: 6 for cello/violin, b, Op. 12 (1783), also as Op. 2 (Berlin and Amsterdam, n.d.), ? also as 6 solos, Op. 10 (London, n.d.);
- 6 as Op. 28 (1787);
- 6 as Op. 40 (c1795)

---Other works---

- Inès et Léonore, ou La sœur jalouse (oc, 3, Gautier, after Caldéron), Versailles, 14 Nov 1788 (1789);
- ov. arr. pf, J.B. Cramer (1790) À ma marraine, air populaire avec paroles nouvelles, 1v unacc., F-Pn
- Airs variés: Les nocturnes, ou 6 airs variés, violin, cello, Op. 9 (1782), as 6 Favorite Airs with Variations (London, no date);
- Air de Marlborough (cello, doublebass)/(violin, cello) Op. 13 (1783);
- Petits airs variés, hpd, Op. 36 (c. 1795), lost;
- 12 petits airs, cello (1799), ?arr. of Op. 36
- Allegro First Movement from Concertino

== Treatises ==
- Bréval, Jean-Baptiste (1804). Traité du violoncelle, op. 42. Paris: Janet et Cotelle. OCLC 915897049. Partial English translation (?1810).
