= Ducreux =

Ducreux is a French surname. Notable people with the surname include:

- Daniel Ducreux (born 1947), French cyclist and Olympian
- Francis Ducreux (1945–2021), French cyclist
- Joseph Ducreux (1735–1802), French artist
- Louis Ducreux (1911–1992), French actor, screenwriter and composer
- Rose-Adélaïde Ducreux (1761–1802), French painter and musician
