= Studies for cello (J.-L. Duport) =

The Studies for cello (Études pour violoncello) by Jean-Louis Duport (1749-1819) are a staple of cello pedagogical repertoire. Duport was a French cellist who, along with his brother Jean-Pierre Duport, revolutionized the performance of the cello.

Only few of Duport's concert works are remembered today. His Études for Cello, however, remain foremost in cello practice, despite being over 200 years old. They were primarily composed by Duport himself, although the sixth was composed by Berteau, Duport's teacher. Studies eight and ten were composed by his brother Jean-Pierre.

== Background ==
All of the studies have specific challenges within them that greatly benefit cellists of all skill levels, although beginning cellists will find many of these studies beyond their technical abilities. Many of the studies have a direct and narrow range of technical focus, often a specific bowing or fingering technique.

== Select studies ==
All information and examples were drawn from the complete score.

=== Study No. 2 ===
This F minor study, features triplets that are primarily written to be bowed, although there are examples when some slurs between triplets occurs (See example 2.1). Consistent control of the bow is significant in this study, as there are countless repetitive strokes marked. One must be able to apply a bow stroke that is consistent with the last in terms of length, speed, and pressure applied on the strings. Another challenge that Duport recognizes is that of making large interval leaps, which involve crossing one or more strings smoothly, as when Study No. 2 begins (Ex. 2.1)

Example 2.1
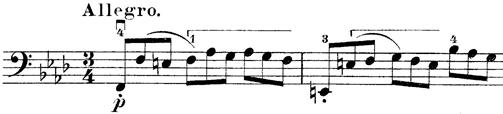

=== Study No. 3 ===
This short work is designed to give the cellist practice in chromatic fingering as well as repetitive bowing. The beginning features a full chromatic octave beginning on the bottom C of the cello played without slurring. This presents multiple challenges to the musician such as fingering, position changes, and intonation. While mostly in conjunct motion, some large jumps of an octave or more occur on many downbeats.

=== Study No. 6 ===
Study No. 6 was actually composed by the teacher of the Duport brothers, Martin Berteau. Written in G major, this study focuses on triplets and extended cello range.

Example 6.1

=== Study No. 7 ===
Study No. 7 focuses on playing sweeping 16th note chords with each bow stroke containing 1 count (See ex. 7.1), with stopped notes occurring on the downbeat of select measures. The harmonic structure is similar to Classical or late Baroque music.

Challenges include keeping the bow under complete control and delivering even strokes that contact the strings equally, and quick chord shifts in the left hand.

Example 7.1

=== Study No. 8 ===
Study No. 8 in D major, adagio cantabile, was written by Duport's elder brother, Jean-Pierre Duport. Double stops, including a counterpoint of plucked bass notes provide a substantial exercise.

The underlying eight notes provide a harmonic and tempo foundation. Challenges include precise bow control, and accurate left hand placement.

Example 8.1
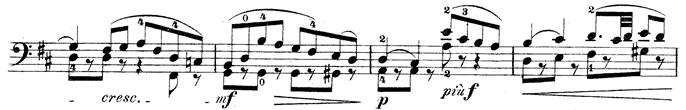

=== Study No. 9 ===
Study No. 9 contains many challenges such as, high range (ex. 9.1), chromatic lines, parallel double stops (ex. 9.2), precise staccato bowings, demanding left hand techniques such as ascending scales and sequences, sequenced interval jumps (ex. 9.3), and pedal point harmonies.

Example 9.1
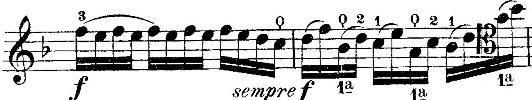

Example 9.2
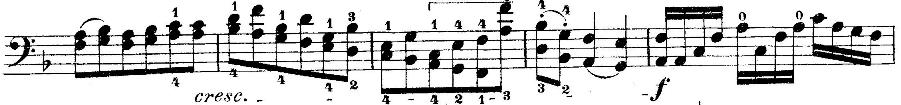

Example 9.3
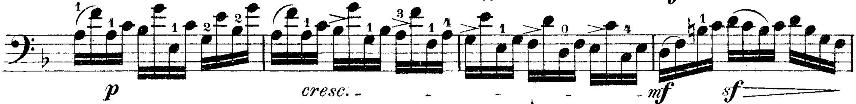
