= Grand Duo concertant (Chopin and Franchomme) =

Composition for piano and cello by Frédéric Chopin and Auguste Franchomme

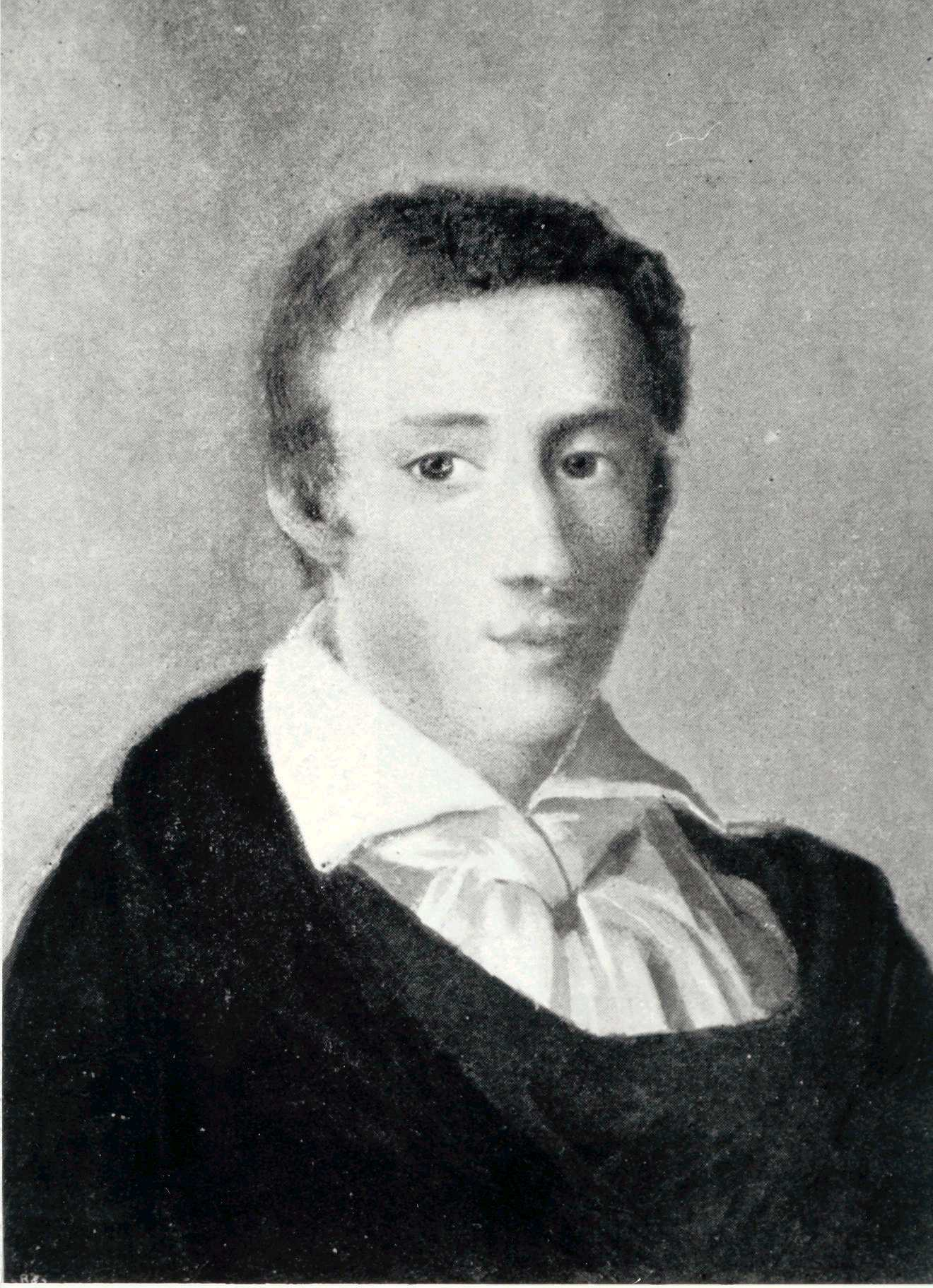
Frédéric Chopin, by Mieroszewski, 1829

The Grand Duo concertant in E major, B. 70 is a composition for piano and cello, written jointly by Frédéric Chopin and Auguste Franchomme. It was written in 1832 and published in 1833.

Chopin had initially been contracted by his publishers to write a work for piano based on Giacomo Meyerbeer's opera Robert le diable. He had attended a performance and liked the work, but was disinclined to write a "fantasia" (as he put it in a letter to his family) on another composer's music. However, his friend Auguste Franchomme persuaded him to jointly write a piece for cello and piano, using themes from the opera. Chopin devised the general structure of the piece and wrote the piano part, with Franchomme writing the cello part. The piece was published under both their names, and was favourably reviewed by Robert Schumann. Chopin later dedicated his Cello Sonata in G minor to Franchomme, and they remained close friends until Chopin's death in 1849.

The piece appears in catalogues of Chopin's works as B. 70.
