= Self-Portrait with a Harp (Rose-Adélaïde Ducreux) =

18th-century French painting

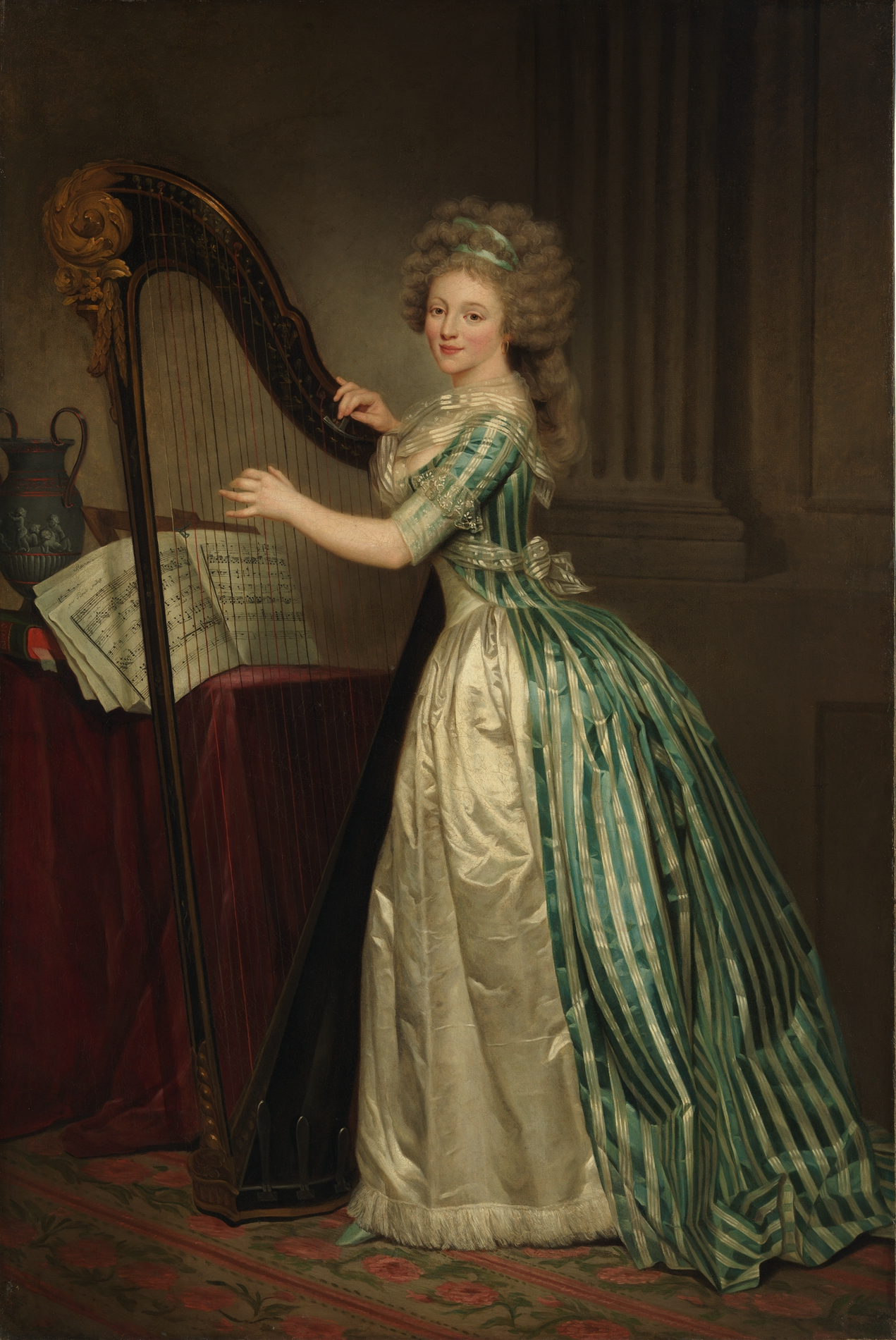
- Artist: Rose-Adélaïde Ducreux
- Year: 1791
- Medium: oil paint, canvas
- Dimensions: 193 cm (76 in) × 128.9 cm (50.7 in)
- Location: Metropolitan Museum of Art
- Accession: 67.55.1

Self-Portrait with a Harp is a 1791 painting (self-portrait) by Rose-Adélaïde Ducreux. It is in the collection of the Metropolitan Museum of Art.

== Early history and creation ==
Rose-Adélaïde Ducreux, daughter of Joseph Ducreux, portraitist of Marie Antoinette, was trained by her father. Because the family were not members of the Académie Royale de Peinture et de Sculpture exhibiting works at the official Salon was barred prior to the French Revolution. In 1791, the Salon became open to other artists and Self-Portrait with a Harp was first displayed in a joint debut with her father in the Salon of the Louvre that year. It was one of two paintings exhibited by Ducreux.

== Later history and display ==
The painting was shown in an exhibit entitled "Selection of Works by French and English Painters of the Eighteenth Century" hosted by the Art Gallery of the Corporation of London between 22 April and 26 July 1902. After the exhibition, the painting was sold and went into the private collection of David H. King Jr. in 1905 and remained until 1938 when it was sold to Susan Dwight Bliss.

== Description and interpretation ==
The work depicts Rose-Adélaïde Ducreux, who was often the subject of her artistic works. Because the career of painter was uncommon for women and perceived as a masculine endeavor, it was not a widely accepted occupation at the time. Female artists frequently used themselves as a subject, creating a persona of femininity. By employing her beauty, talent and charm, Ducreux captured the traits society valued for women in her era. Painted in a Neoclassical style, the image is a life-sized, standing portrait of the artist playing a harp. The instrument, is depicted as a prop for the splendor of the female form draped in a luxurious, silk gown highlighting the artist's refinement. In addition to her youthful beauty, her enlightenment is enhanced by the presence of a novel, her skill with music, and a decorative vase on a nearby table.
