= François Cupis de Renoussard =

French musician and composer (1732–1808)

- Born: 10 November 1732; Paris, Paris
- Died: 13 October 1808 (aged 75); Paris
- Occupations: Composer; Cellist; Educator

François Cupis de Renoussard Seigneur de Renoussard, called le cadet (10 November 1732 – 13 October 1808) was an 18th-century classical French composer, cellist and music educator.

== Biography ==
François Cupis de Renoussard was the son of Ferdinand-Joseph de Cupis Camargo, teacher of violin and maître à danser rue de la Montagne in Brussels, and Marie-Anne de Smet.

He was the brother of the famous ballerina Marie-Anne de Cupis de Camargo (1710–1770) and violinist Jean-Baptiste de Cupis de Camargo.

He was a pupil of Martin Berteau. In 1750, he entered the Paris Opéra as basse du grand chœur. He stayed there until 1770.

Through his numerous compositions, which were musically of little inspiration, but had educational significance, Cupis strengthened his reputation for having given the cello in France a greater importance. François Cupis, on the one hand, stands in the same line between his teacher, Martin Berteau and Jean-Baptiste Barrière, and on the other, the brothers Jean-Louis and Jean-Pierre Duport.

== Works ==
In addition to several works, not mentioned by François-Joseph Fétis, François Cupis wrote:

- Arrangements: Recueil d'airs choisis des meilleurs auteurs pour violoncelle (1761)
- Recueil d'airs choisis des meilleurs auteurs ajustés pour le violoncelle (Paris, Le Menu, 1761)
- 6 Sonatas for Cello and Bass, Op. 1 (c. 1761)
- 6 Duos for 2 Cellos, Op. 2 (c. 1767), missing
- 6 Duos for 2 Cellos, Op. 3 (c. 1770)
- 3 Duos, for 2 Cellos, Op. 5 (1773)
- 2 Cello concertos, mentioned by Fétis and Ernst Ludwig Gerber (missing)
- Six duo (sic) pour deux violoncelles, Op. 3 (Paris, La Chevardière)
- Six duo (sic) pour deux violoncelles, Op. 5 (Bayeux, Le Menu, 1773)
- Airs d'opéra-comiques pour deux violoncelles (Paris, 1777)
- Cello Concerto in D Major (1783)
- Concerto à grand orchestre pour le violoncelle (Paris, 1783). The orchestra includes strings, 2 oboes and 2 horns; (Paris, 1783)
- Air de l'Aveugle de Palmire, and Menuet de Fischer, for 2 cellos (c. 1784)
- Recueil de petits airs variés et dialogués for 2 cellos, Op. 9 (around 1800)
- Méthode nouvelle et raisonnée pour apprendre à jouer du violoncelle (Paris, Le Menu, 1772). The method contains comments on the technique of the instrument.

== Bibliography ==
- François Schoonjans, « Amour, danse, musique, lignages : les Cupis de Camargo », in, Les Lignages de Bruxelles, Brussels, n° 55-56, 1973, p. 49-54.
- Benoit, Marcelle (1992). Dictionnaire de la musique en France aux XVIIe et XVIIIe siècles (in French). Paris: Fayard. p. 195. ISBN 978-2-213-02824-8.
