= Duport Stradivarius =

Extant Stradivarius cello

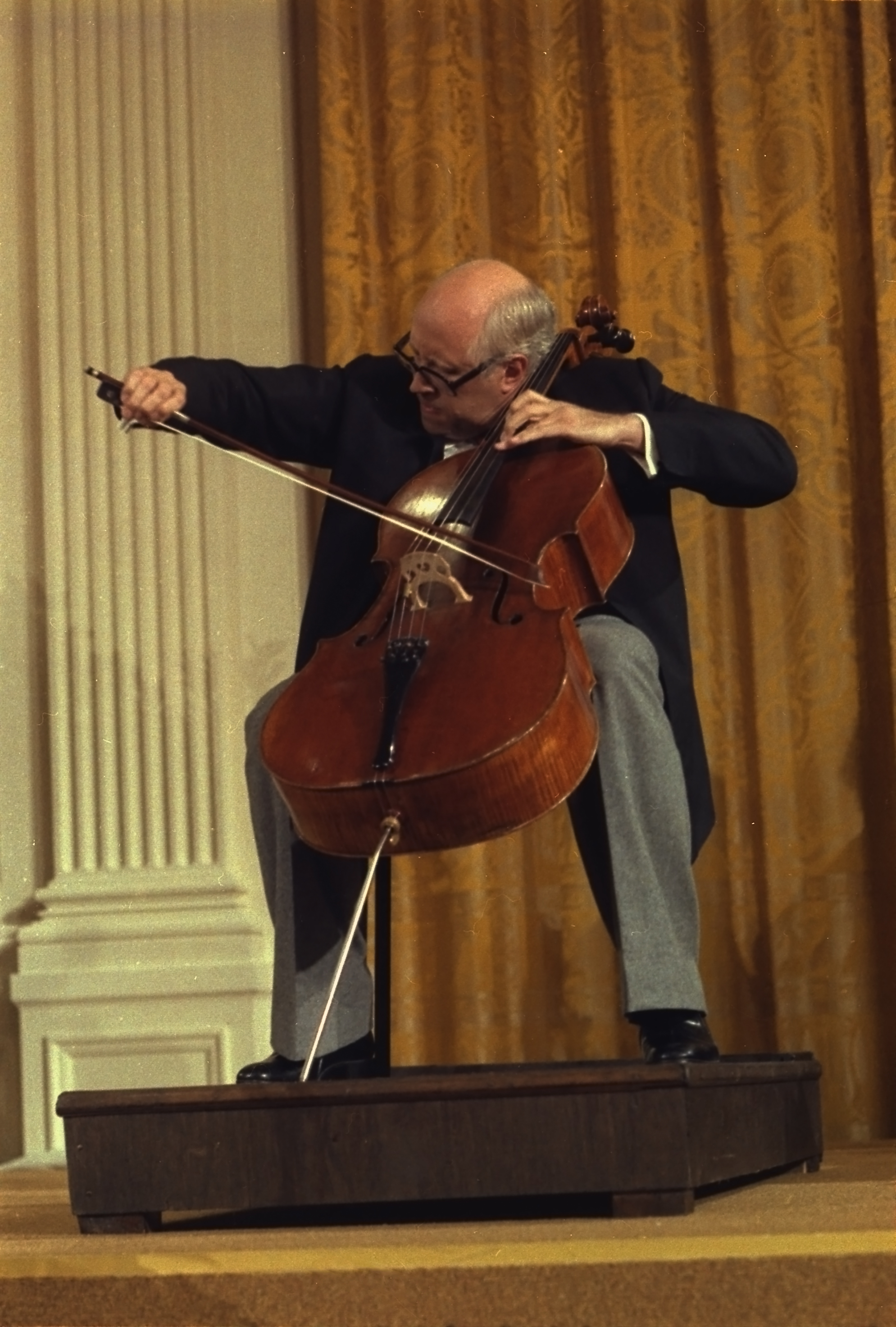
The Duport Stradivarius being played by Mstislav Rostropovich in 1978.

The Duport Stradivarius is a cello made in 1711 by Italian luthier Antonio Stradivari of Cremona. The instrument is named after Jean-Louis Duport, who played it from around 1800 until his death.

== Construction ==
The Duport is one of Stradivari's 'B Form' cellos. This form, which Stradivari first used in 1709, arose from requests by patrons for a smaller cello that was more versatile. In addition to its smaller dimensions, the B Form cellos took advantage of recent advancements in string technology and production.

== History ==
The cello was built in 1711, likely at the request of King Louis XIV's personal physician, François Chicoyneau. When Chicoyneau died in 1752, the cello was sent to Paris to be sold by a private dealer. When this failed, the cello was put up for public auction. Cellist Jean-Louis Duport (not to be confused with his older brother Jean-Pierre), submitted a bid with the help of two friends, both of whom were princes. The auction failed, however, and the cello's sale was eventually entrusted to private dealer George Cousineau. The Duport brothers were later contacted to see if they remained interested in the cello, and they bought it for a relatively low price.

In 1812, Jean-Louis Duport permitted Emperor Napoleon to handle the cello after giving a concert at the Tuileries Palace; a dent, still visible on the instrument, is said to have resulted from the emperor's rough handling while straddling the cello with his boots. Jean-Louis Duport died in 1819 and the cello was passed to his son. Auguste-Joseph Franchomme set a price record by purchasing it for FRF25,000 in 1843 from Duport's son. The instrument maker Jean Baptiste Vuillaume used the Duport as the primary model for his cellos.

Prior to its acquisition in 1974 by Mstislav Rostropovich, cellist Gerald Warburg was the owner. He died in 1971 and reportedly told violin dealer Etienne Vatelot that the cello should be sold only to Rostropovich and no one else. Rostropovich used a number of cellos including instruments by Goffriller and Storioni. The Duport, however, was reported to be his favorite, especially in his later years. After Rostropovich's death the cello was initially reported in the press as purchased by the Nippon Music Foundation for $20 US million, but Rostropovich's heirs later commented that they remained the owners of the famous cello, according to a legal representative for the family. Its exact whereabouts remain unknown, and very little if any new information has appeared about it since the disputed article in 2008.
