= Charles Lebouc =

French cellist and composer (1822–1893)

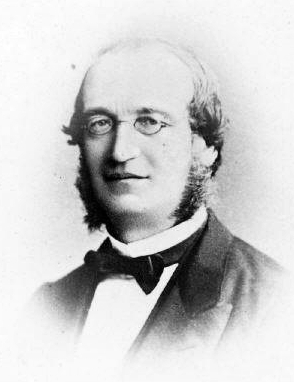
Charles Lebouc

Charles Joseph Lebouc (22 December 1822 – 6 March 1893) was a French cellist and composer.

== Career ==
Born in Besançon, Lebouc attended the Conservatoire in Paris where he studied under Olive Charlier Vaslin (1794–1889) and Louis Norblin, and later became a cello professor. He played chamber music. He also composed some pieces for the cello with piano accompaniment and wrote a Méthode complète et pratique de violoncelle. He won a first prize at the Conservatoire in 1842 when he was a student of Auguste Franchomme, and a first prize in harmony in 1844 as a student of Fromental Halévy.

In later years he organised annual private concerts on Shrove Tuesday, and on one of these occasions, on 9 March 1886, the first performance of the Carnival of the Animals by Saint-Saëns was given, in which Lebouc played the well-known cello solo, The Swan.

Lebouc died in Hyères.
