= Jean-Baptiste Janson =

French cellist and composer

- Born: Jean-Baptiste-Aimé-Joseph Janson; 9 March 1742; Valenciennes
- Died: 2 September 1803 (aged 61); Paris
- Occupation(s): Cellist; Composer

Jean-Baptiste Janson (9 March 1742 – 2 September 1803) was a French cellist and composer of the classical period.

== Life ==
Jean-Baptiste Janson was a pupil of Martin Berteau. At age thirteen he played at the Concert Spirituel of Paris and was musician of Louis François, Prince of Conti. He traveled abroad and returned to Paris only after Jean-Pierre Duport left for Berlin in 1773. "Surintendant de la musique de Monsieur" circa 1786, he became a bass teacher at the founding of the Conservatoire de Paris on 3 August 1795. He retired in 1802.

== Selected works ==
- Six Sonates à violoncelle et basse Op. 1 (Paris, 1765)
- Six Sonates à violoncelle et basse Op. 2 (Paris, La Chevadière, 1768)
- Trois Concertos à violoncelle et basse (Op. 3)
- Six Sonates pour le violoncelle et la basse Op. 4 (1774)
- Six Trios pour 2 violons et violoncelle obligé Op. 5 (1777)
- Six Concertos pour le violoncelle à grand orchestre Op. 6 (1780)
- Six Quatuors concertans pour 2 violons, alto et violoncelle Op.7
- Trois Quatuors concertans pour 2 violons, alto et violoncelle Op.8 (1784)
- Trois Symphonies à grand orchestre (Paris, Leduc, 1785)
- Messe Solemnelle d'action de grâce (1789)
- Te Deum (1789)
- Six Nouveaux Concertos à grand orchestre pour le violoncelle Op.15 (1799).

== Bibliography ==
- Sylvette Milliot: Le violoncelle en France au XVIIIe siècle. Édition Champion-Slatkine, Paris 1985, ISBN 2-05-100690-3. (Dissertation Université Sorbonne 1981)
- Benoît, Marcelle (1992). Dictionnaire de la musique en France aux XVIIe et XVIIIe siècles (in French). Paris: Fayard. p. 368. ISBN 978-2-213-02824-8.
