= Norblin =

Norblin is a surname. Notable people with the surname include:

- Jan Piotr Norblin (Jean Pierre) (1740–1830), French-Polish painter, draughtsman, engraver, and caricaturist
- Louis Norblin (1781–1854), French musician, cello teacher at the Paris Conservatoire
