= Auguste Franchomme =

French cellist and composer (1808–1884)

Auguste-Joseph Franchomme
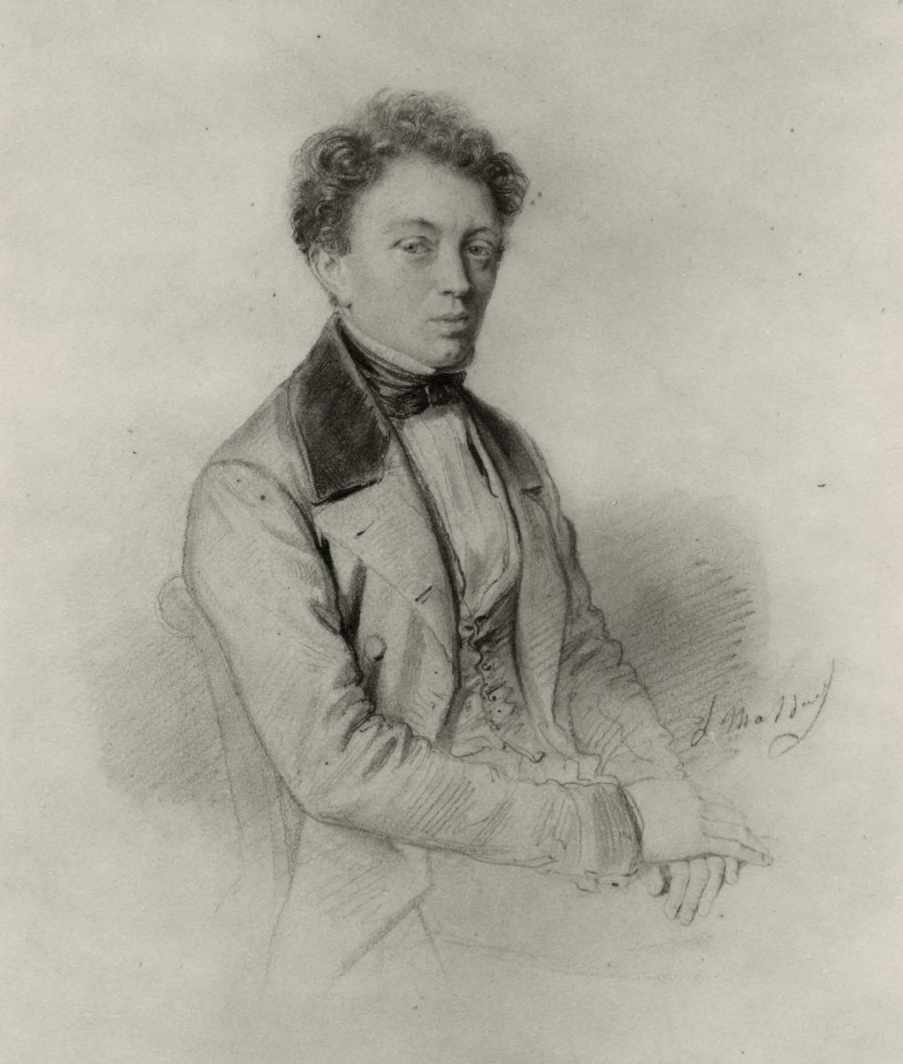

Background information
- Born: 10 April 1808; Lille, France
- Died: 21 January 1884 (aged 75) Paris, France
- Genres: Classical
- Occupations: Cellist, composer
- Instrument: Violoncello

Auguste-Joseph Franchomme [fʁɑ̃.kɔm] (10 April 1808 – 21 January 1884) was a French cellist and composer. In addition to his work in Paris, he collaborated with Spanish cellist Víctor Mirecki Larramat and Belgian cellist Adrien-François Servais in founding what is considered the Spanish school of cellists, influencing future generations there. For his many contributions to music, he was decorated with the French Légion d'honneur in 1884.

== Life and career ==
Born in Lille, Franchomme studied at the local conservatoire with M. Mas and Pierre Baumann. He moved to continue his education with Jean-Henri Levasseur and Louis-Pierre Norblin at the Conservatoire de Paris, where he won the first prize in his first year.

Franchomme began his career playing with various orchestras and was appointed solo cello at Sainte-Chapelle in 1828. Along with violinist Jean-Delphin Alard, teacher of Pablo de Sarasate, and pianist Charles Hallé, creator of the Hallé Orchestra, he was a founding member of the Alard Quartet. The Quartet was rare for a chamber ensemble of its time because it consisted of professional musicians. Franchomme also belonged to the founding ranks of the Société des Concerts du Conservatoire.

Franchomme forged close friendships with Felix Mendelssohn, when the latter visited Paris in 1831, and with Franz Liszt as well as Frédéric Chopin. In 1833, Chopin and Franchomme collaborated to write a Grand Duo concertant for piano and cello, based on themes from Giacomo Meyerbeer's opera Robert le diable. Franchomme also rewrote the cello parts for Chopin's Polonaise Brillante, Op. 3, and was the dedicatee of Chopin's Cello Sonata, Op. 65.

With the exception of a trip to England in 1856, Franchomme hardly left Paris, where he became a central figure of the city's musical life. In 1843, he acquired the Duport Stradivarius from the son of Jean-Louis Duport for the then-record sum of 22,000 French francs. He also owned the De Munck Stradivarius of 1730. Franchomme succeeded Norblin as the head professor of cello at the Paris Conservatory in 1846, and his class included Jules Delsart (who succeeded his master), Louis Hegyesi, and Ernest Gillet.

He died in his sleep of heart attack on 21 January 1884 at the age of 75, four days after he received the Légion d'honneur.

== Legacy ==
Franchomme was among the most celebrated cellists of his time and contributed to the refinement of the bowing technique—elegant, sweet, and light—which distinguished the French school developed by Jean-Pierre and Jean-Louis Duport. His left hand was renowned for its deft, precise, and expressive powers of execution. On 3 May 1856, the Weekly Chronicle and Register noted that he "carefully abstains from all abuse of the tremolo and of the exaggerated expression which are the distinguishing features in most modern violoncello playing".

As a composer, Franchomme published some fifty-five works for cello, including the Twelve Caprices, Op. 7, and the Twelve Études, with optional second cello, Op. 35; one cello concerto, Op. 33; as well as numerous other pieces with piano, orchestral, or chamber accompaniment.

== Recordings ==
The Complete Caprices and Études (Clay Ruede, cello), Koch International 3-7226 (1994)

The Franchomme Project (Louise Dubin et al., cello), Delos International DE3469 (2015)
