= Jean-Louis Duport =

French cellist and composer (1749–1819)

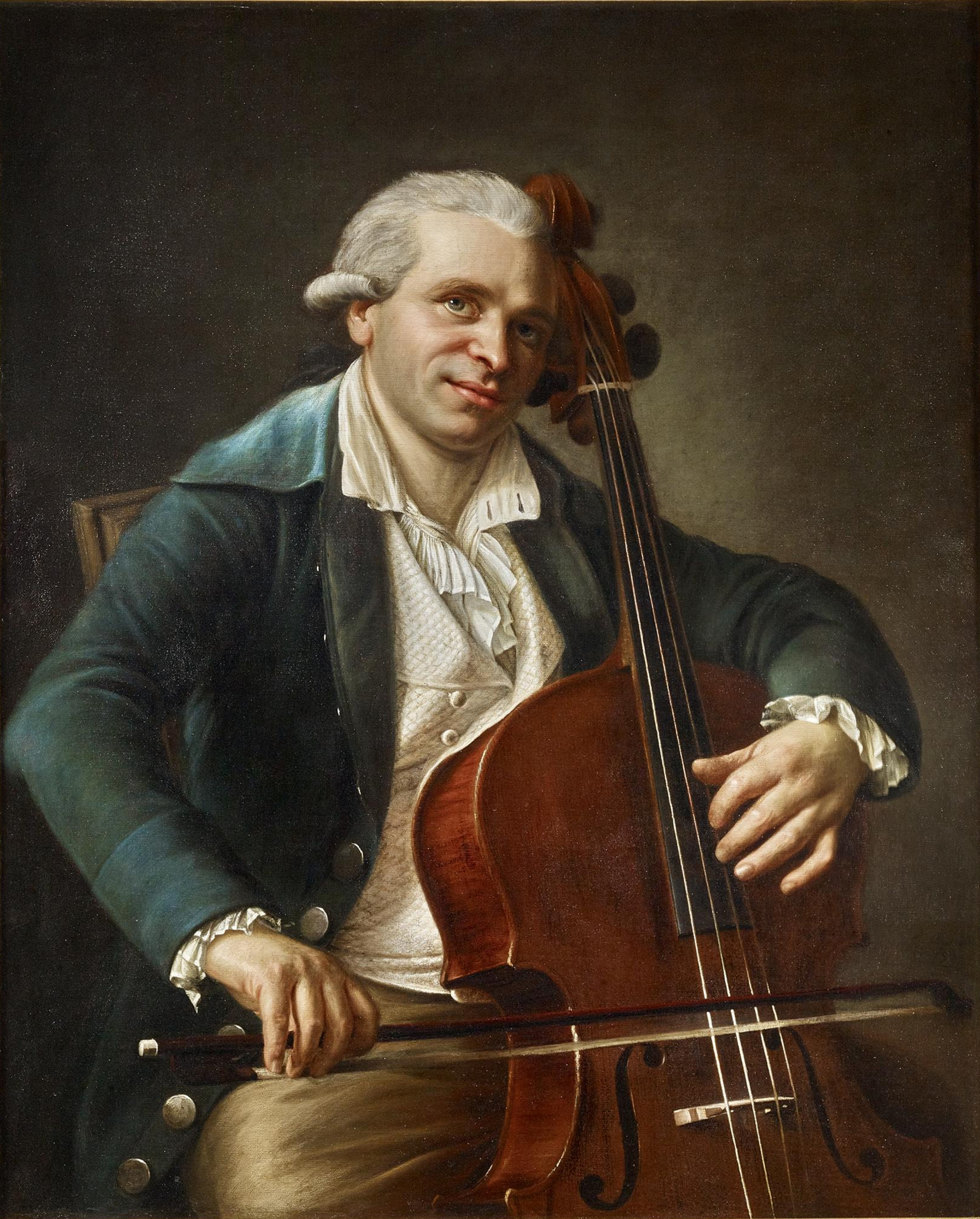
- Jean Louis Duport in 1788 by Remi-Fursy Descarsin
- Born: 4 October 1749
- Died: 7 September 1819
- Occupations: Composer, Cellist

Jean-Louis Duport (4 October 1749 – 7 September 1819), sometimes known as Duport the Younger to distinguish him from his older brother (and teacher) Jean-Pierre (1741-1818), was a cellist, pedagogue, and composer.

He is perhaps best known today for his 21 études for solo cello that constitute the final part of the "Essai sur le doigté du violoncelle et sur la conduite de l'archet" ("Essay on the fingering of the violoncello and on the conduct of the bow") (1806), a seminal work of cello technique. He also wrote six cello concertos and his Études pour violoncello.

Duport and Jean-Pierre refined their technique in France under the tutelage of Martin Berteau. His virtuosic ability allowed him to hold many notable positions while living in France, although he was forced to flee to Prussia as a result of the French Revolution. Duport resided in Berlin while in Prussia, where he gained the favor of King Friedrich Wilhelm II. He also collaborated with Ludwig van Beethoven on his Op. 5 cello sonatas, which proved to be a defining point in Beethoven's treatment of the cello in his scores, and also altered the cello's role to become a true solo instrument.

In 1812, Jean-Louis returned to Paris, where he encountered Napoleon, who insisted on trying out Duport's Stradivarius cello, exclaiming, "How the devil do you hold this thing, Monsieur Duport?" Duport was so obviously afraid that Napoleon would damage it, that Napoleon laughingly returned it to the cellist's more careful hands. Actually, Napoleon had made a small dent in the ribs of the cello, which may still be seen in the instrument. It was later owned by Auguste Franchomme and also Mstislav Rostropovich.

== "Essay on the fingering of the violoncello and on the conduct of the bow" ==
"Essai sur le doigté du violoncelle et sur la conduite de l'archet" ("Essay on the fingering of the violoncello and on the conduct of the bow") is a seminal work of cello technique, by Duport, published by Imbault in Paris in 1806. The French text of 175 pages discusses in detail a wide range of aspects of cello technique, and is followed by 21 Etudes for two cellos, of various difficulty levels. The work has been translated into English and German, and is widely accepted as the most influential pedagogical work for the instrument.
