= Cello Sonata (Chopin) =

Cello sonata by Frédéric Chopin

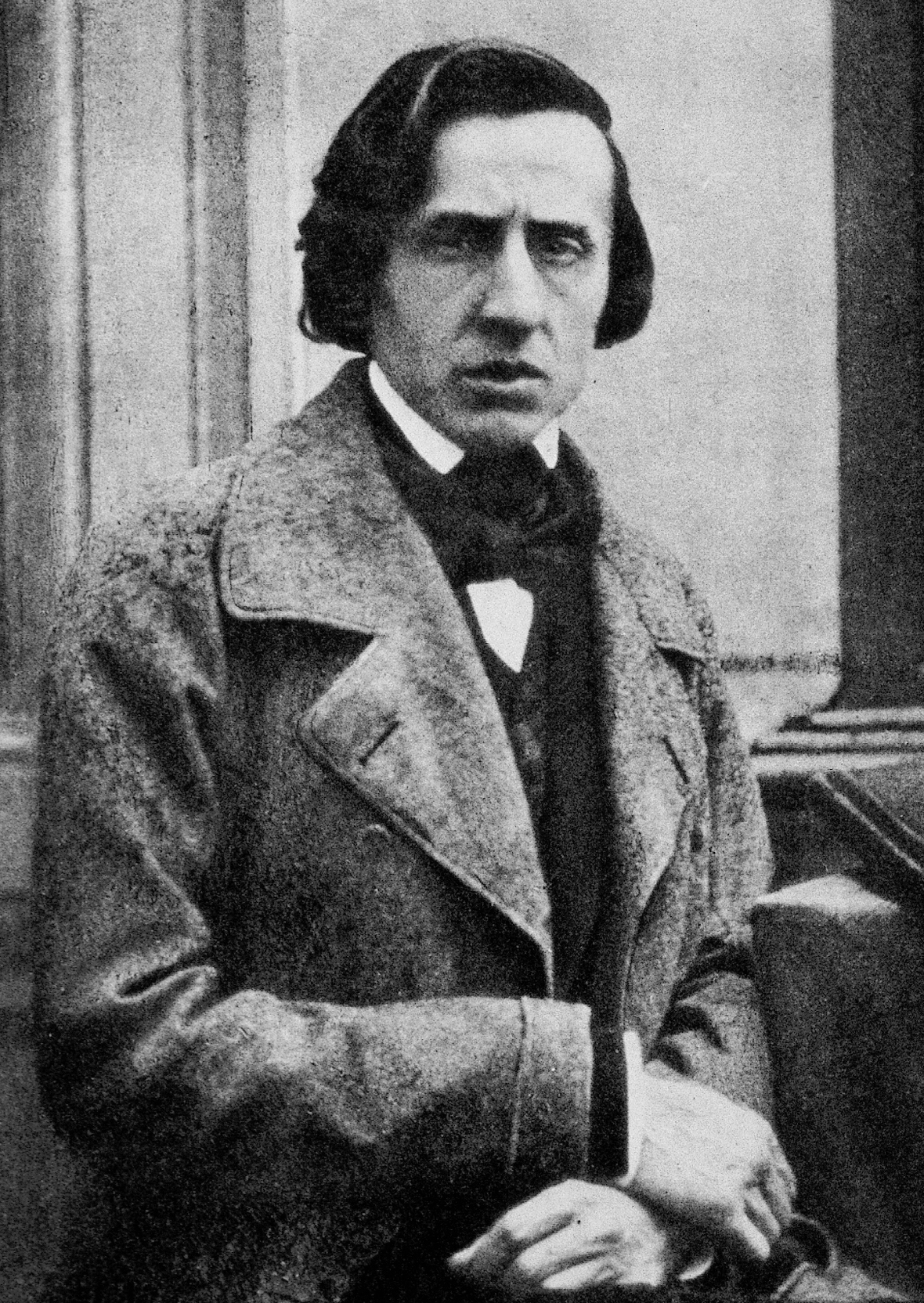
Frédéric Chopin, c. 1849

The Cello Sonata in G minor, Op. 65, was written by Frédéric Chopin in late 1845–47. It is one of only nine works of Chopin published during his lifetime that were written for instruments other than piano (although the piano still appears in every work he wrote). Chopin composed four sonatas, the other three being piano sonatas. The cello sonata was the last of Chopin's works to be published in his lifetime.

The sonata was written for and dedicated to Auguste Franchomme. The sonata is remarkable for the concentration of its material: much of the music of the first movement grows out of the cello’s opening statement, and certain theme-shapes appear in all its movements. The last three movements were first publicly performed by Franchomme and Chopin at the composer's last public concert, at the Salle Pleyel on 16 February 1848.

== Structure ==
I. Allegro moderato
Performed by John Michel, cello and Lisa Bergman, piano

II. Scherzo
Performed by John Michel, cello and Lisa Bergman, piano

III. Largo
Performed by Giorgi Latso, piano and Wen-Hsiu, cello

The composition consists of four movements:

1. Allegro moderato in G minor
2. Scherzo in D minor, Trio in D major
3. Largo in B♭ major
4. Finale. Allegro in G minor, ending in G major

It takes around 30 minutes to perform.
