= Louis-Pierre Norblin =

French musician (1781–1854)

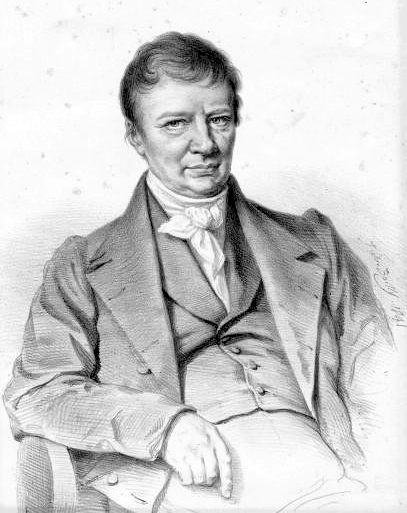

Louis Pierre Martin Norblin (2 December 1781, in Warsaw – 14 July 1854, in Connantre) was a French musician. His father was Polish-French painter Jan Piotr Norblin (1740–1830).

He taught cello at the Paris Conservatoire, where his students included Charles Lebouc, Auguste Franchomme and Louis-Marie Pilet. He was the editor of the first edition of the J. S. Bach Six Suites for Violoncello Solo BWV 1007–1012, published by Janet et Cotelle in Paris in approximately 1824; according to the preface of the edition, it is based on an unidentified manuscript found in Germany by Pierre Norblin. The edition shows signs of extensive editing, and has some incorrect notes that have been repeated in other editions up to the present day. The composer George Onslow dedicated his String Quintet no. 15, op. 38 to Norblin.

Norblin was also an art collector. His son Émile Norblin (1821–1880) was also a musician and art collector.
