= Rose-Adélaïde Ducreux =

French painter and musician (1761–1802)

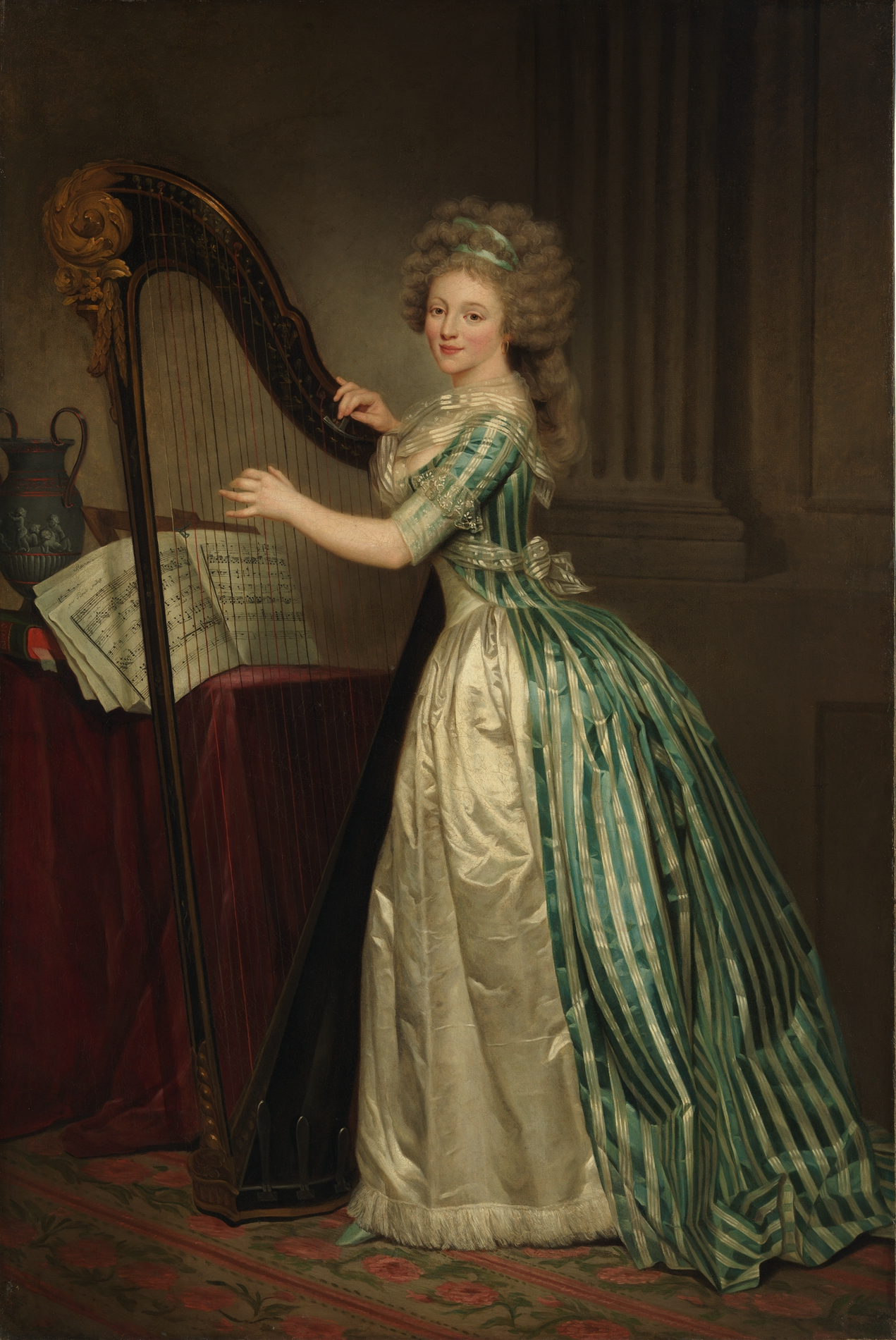
- Self-Portrait with a Harp of 1791, in the collection of the Metropolitan Museum of Art
- Born: 1761; Paris, France
- Died: July 26, 1802 (aged 40–41); Saint-Domingue, Hispaniola
- Known for: Painter and musician
- Parents: Joseph Ducreux (father); Philippine Rose Cosse (mother)

Rose-Adélaïde Ducreux (1761 – July 26, 1802) was a French painter and musician, born in Paris. She was the eldest daughter of Joseph Ducreux, with whom she also studied. She showed her works at the Louvre salons in 1791, 1793, 1795, 1798, and 1799. She was accomplished both as a performer and as a composer.

== Biography ==
In 1786, Ducreux first exhibited at one of Pahin de la Blancherie's bi-weekly exhibitions, known as the Salon de la Correspondance. This self-portrait in pastel at an unknown location depicted the artist in the act of painting. Her self-portraits often included musical and artistic attributes.

A self-portrait of Ducreux seated at a piano-forte, c. 1785, formerly part of the Erlanger Collection, was misattributed to Jacques-Louis David for a long time, as were other pieces of her work. Work by Decreux has also been misattributed to her contemporaries, Antoine Vestier and Élisabeth Vigée Le Brun. In her brief career, Ducreux exhibited at a number of important exhibitions beginning in 1786 and continuing until 1799, including the January 1786 Salon de la Correspondance. Ducreux made her debut at the Louvre Salon in 1791, where she submitted a portrait of a young woman and a life-size, full-length self-portrait in which she is depicted playing the harp; the latter oil on canvas is now in the collection of the Metropolitan Museum of Art, though many of her works remain untraced today. She never signed her work. As with many women artists of the eighteenth century, Ducreux painted herself with an object of accomplishment, the harp, rather than her painterly tools in the fashion of her male counterparts.

In 1802, Ducreux moved to Saint-Domingue, where she married the maritime prefect, François-Jacques Lequoy de Montgiraud. She died shortly after of yellow fever. She died two days after her father.

== Paintings ==
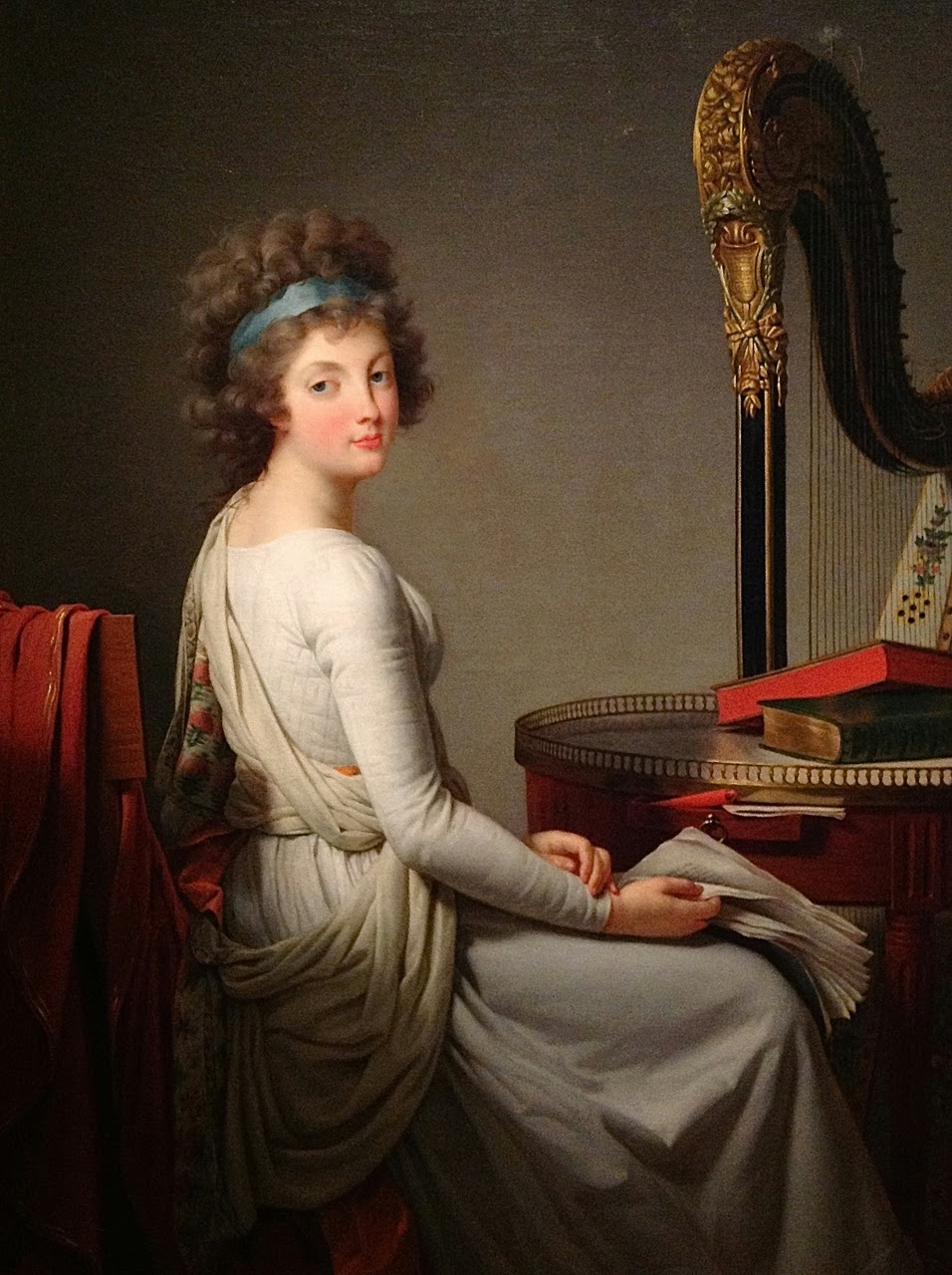
Portrait of Diane de la Vaupaliere (c.1790)

Ducreux adopted the Rococo style in her work. The colors in her portraits were light and gentle to the eye. These portraits were also asymmetric, often having the subject pose and stare off to the side while appearing to be doing something. The following are known pieces of her work.

Self-Portrait with a Harp
Created in 1791, Self-Portrait with a Harp is painted in oil on canvas, with the dimensions 76 x 50 ¾ in (193 x 128.9 cm). This work has been identified with a self-portrait that Durceux exhibited at the Paris Salon of 1791. The portrait was made around the time of the French Revolution, so to some it may seem odd that the painting depicts such a luxurious garment at a time when the population of France revolted against luxury and totalitarianism. However, the painting represents the transitional time of 1791; having the luxury of fabrics contrast the simplicity of the background.
Portrait d'une femme tenant sa fille sur ses genoux
Painted in oil on canvas, its dimensions are 77 x 51.2 in (195 ½ x 130 cm). This work depicts a woman holding a child bearing flowers. The simple background greatly contrasts with a luxury of fabrics.
Portrait of a Lady
Painted in oil on canvas, its dimensions 75 ½ x 50 ½ in (194 x 128 cm).
Portrait of Diane de la Vaupaliere
Created in 1790, it is painted in oil on canvas and shows a portrait of a lady seated before a harp and reading some books. The major color of the painting is brown and in contrast, the lady in white looks like an angel. The painting gives people a peaceful feeling and is now in the collection of the Nelson-Atkins Museum of Art.
