= Martin Berteau =

French musician (1691–1771)

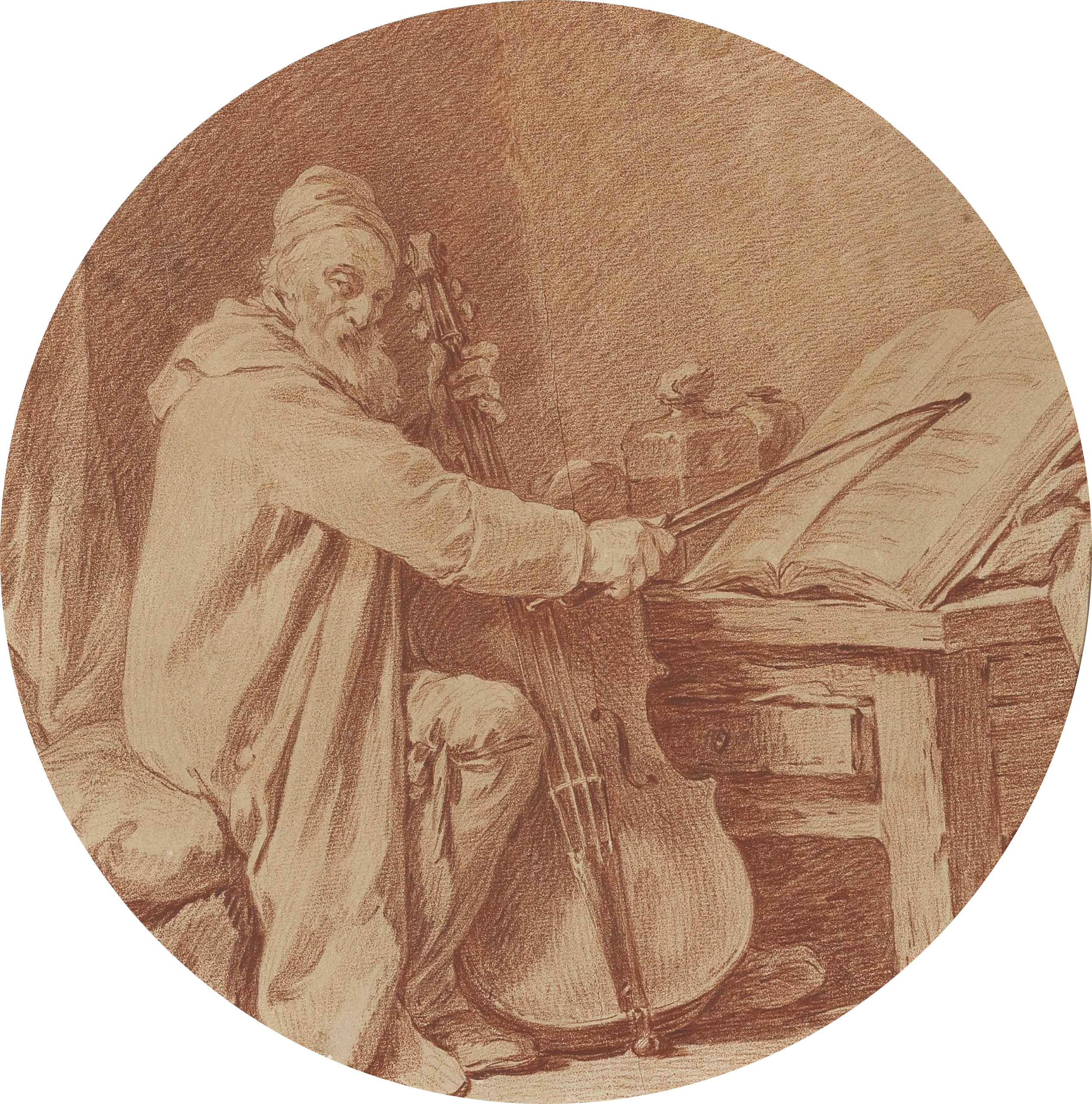
Martin Berteau by Nicolas-Bernard Lépicié

Martin Berteau (2 February 1691 in Valenciennes, French Hainaut – 23 January 1771 in Angers) was a French classical cellist, cello teacher, and composer. He is widely regarded as the founder of the French school of cello playing.

== Life ==
Descriptions of Berteau's life are often unreliable and exaggerated. As a result, little is certain about his life. He probably studied viola da gamba in Germany with the Bohemian Kozecz. F.-J. Fétis, who wrote a Biographie universelle des musiciens (1835–1844), said that Berteau made his debut on the cello in 1739 at the Concert Spirituel, playing his own concerto. However, his name is not mentioned in any media of the time, and neither his concerto nor sketches of it have been found. The only reference of his name was made by Jean-Jacques Rousseau who mentioned having heard Berteau perform in Paris in 1753.

== Works ==
With the exception of a few cello sonatas, much of Berteau's work has been lost. For many decades Berteau's well known Cello Sonata in G major, Op. 25 was credited to the Italian composer Giovanni Battista Sammartini.

== Teaching ==
Among his students were Louis-Ferdinand, Dauphin of France; The Valencian brothers Jean-Baptiste Janson (1742–1804) and Louis Auguste Joseph (1749–1815); Joseph Rey (1738–1811); Jean-Pierre Duport, known as "l'Aîné" (1741–1818), or Joseph Tillière, "ordinary cellist of the Royal Academy of Music", author of a "Méthode pour le cello" published in 1764, François Cupis de Renoussard, cellist and composer, and Jean-Baptiste Bréval (1753–1823), most certainly his last student.
