= Joseph Ducreux =

French portrait painter (1735–1802)

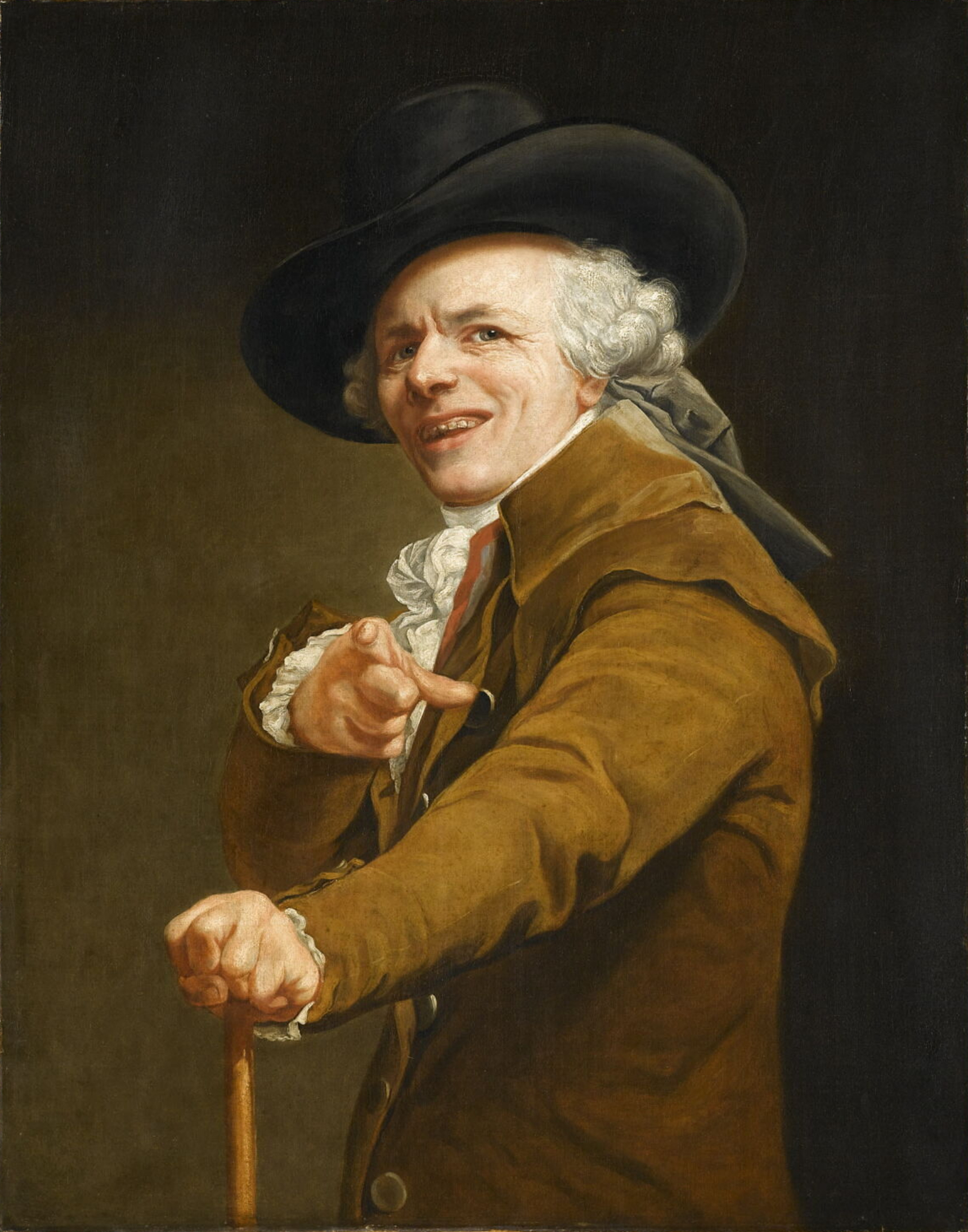
- Self-portrait as the artist as a mocker, c. 1793
- Born: 26 June 1735; Nancy, Duchy of Lorraine
- Died: 24 July 1802 (aged 67); Between Paris and Saint-Denis, France
- Known for: Portrait painting
- Spouse: Philippine Rose Cosse
- Children: 7 children including Rose-Adélaïde and Antoinette-Clémence

Joseph Ducreux (26 June 1735 – 24 July 1802) was a portrait painter, pastelist and etcher from Lorraine who became a French national. He was a successful portraitist at the court of Louis XVI, worked in Austria and England and again in Paris during the later phase of the French Revolution. He was appointed premier peintre de la reine (First Painter to the Queen). He drew the last portrait of King Louis XVI before the king's execution. His less formal portraits reflect his fascination with extreme facial expressions and gestures and his interest in expanding the range of portraiture.

== Life and career ==
Born in Nancy, his father Charles was a premier peintre (first painter) to Stanisław Leszczyński in Nancy. Ducreux may have trained in Nancy with his father. When Ducreux moved to Paris in 1760, he could have trained under the pastelist Maurice Quentin de La Tour, who specialized in portraiture, although there is not much supporting evidence to suggest this apprenticeship. It could be that Ducreux visited De La Tours workshop in the 1760s as from the start of his accounts in 1762 he painted portraits for eminent families which suggests that commissions were directed to him from a workshop such as that of De La Tour. There is more evidence for an apprenticeship with Jean-Baptiste Greuze who was a close friend and an important influence on Ducreux's oil technique.

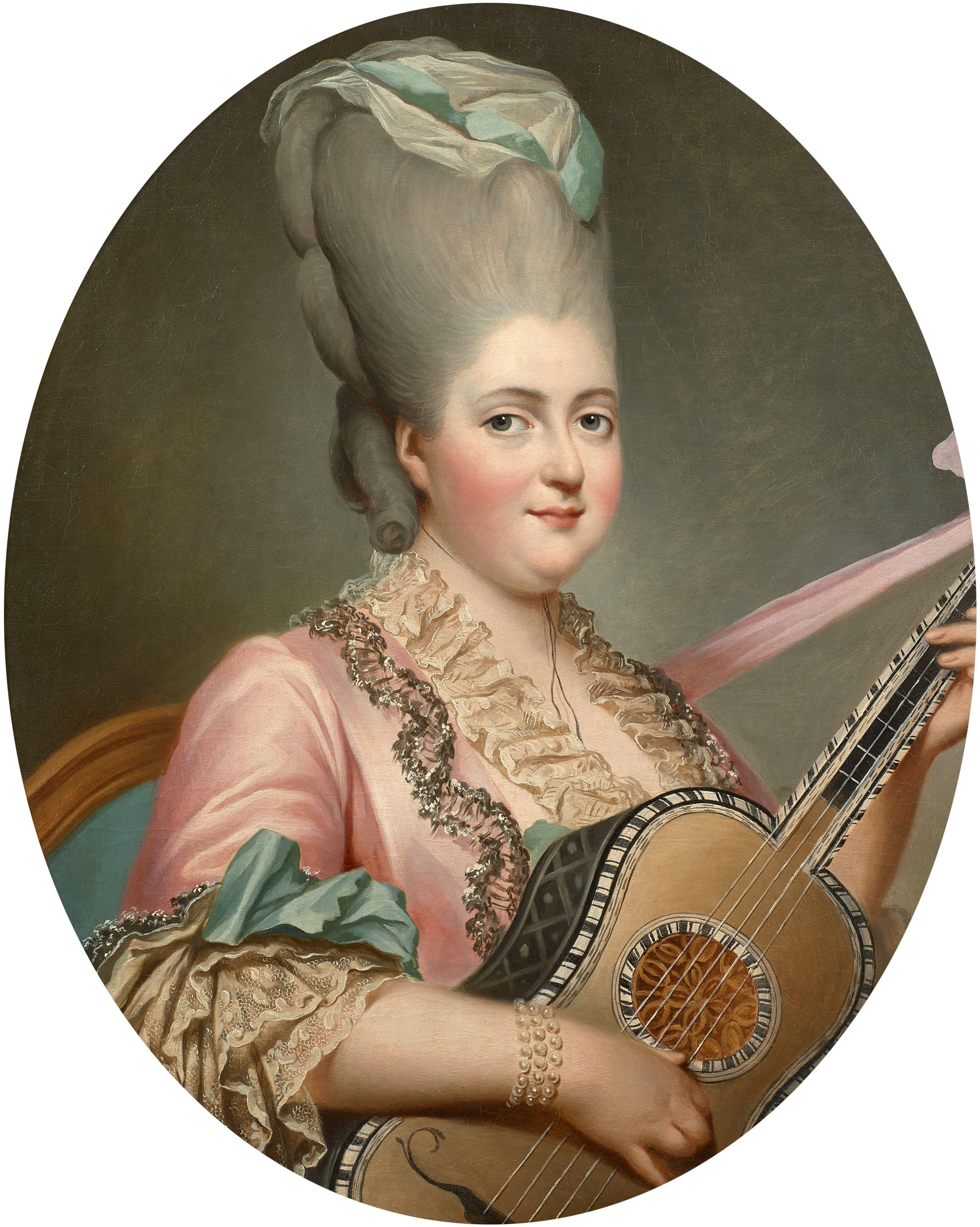
Marie-Adélaïde Clotilde Xavière of France, called Madame Clotilde, playing the guitar

He married Philippine-Rose Cosse at The Church of Saint-Sulpice on 12 November 1760 under a contract signed three days earlier. His wife's sister, Marie-Jacqueline, had married Louis-Joseph Maignen of the family that became closely connected with Ducreux. Ducreux was reçu by the Académie de Saint-Luc (the 'Academy of Saint Luke'), the Paris guild of painters and sculptors, in 1764. He was rejected three times by the Académie royale de peinture et de sculpture because of his irascible character. In 1769, Ducreux was sent to Vienna in order to paint a miniature of Marie Antoinette before she left the city in 1770 and married the future Louis XVI. Ducreux was made a baron and premier peintre de la reine (First Painter to the Queen) in rewards for his services. Ducreux was given this appointment by Marie-Antoinette even though he was not a member of the Royal Academy of Painting and Sculpture, which had been founded in 1648. The academy was strictly hierarchical and the posts of first painter, ordinary painter and inspector or inspector general of royal factories were customarily reserved for members of the academy.

At the outbreak of the French Revolution, Ducreux traveled to London. There he drew the last portrait ever made of Louis XVI before the king's execution.

Jacques-Louis David became one of Ducreux's associates when the latter returned to Paris in 1793. David helped Ducreux continue an official career. Ducreux's residence became an informal salon for artists and musicians, who commissioned portraits from him. One of these musicians was his friend Étienne Méhul, who is said to have based the main character of one of his operas on Ducreux.

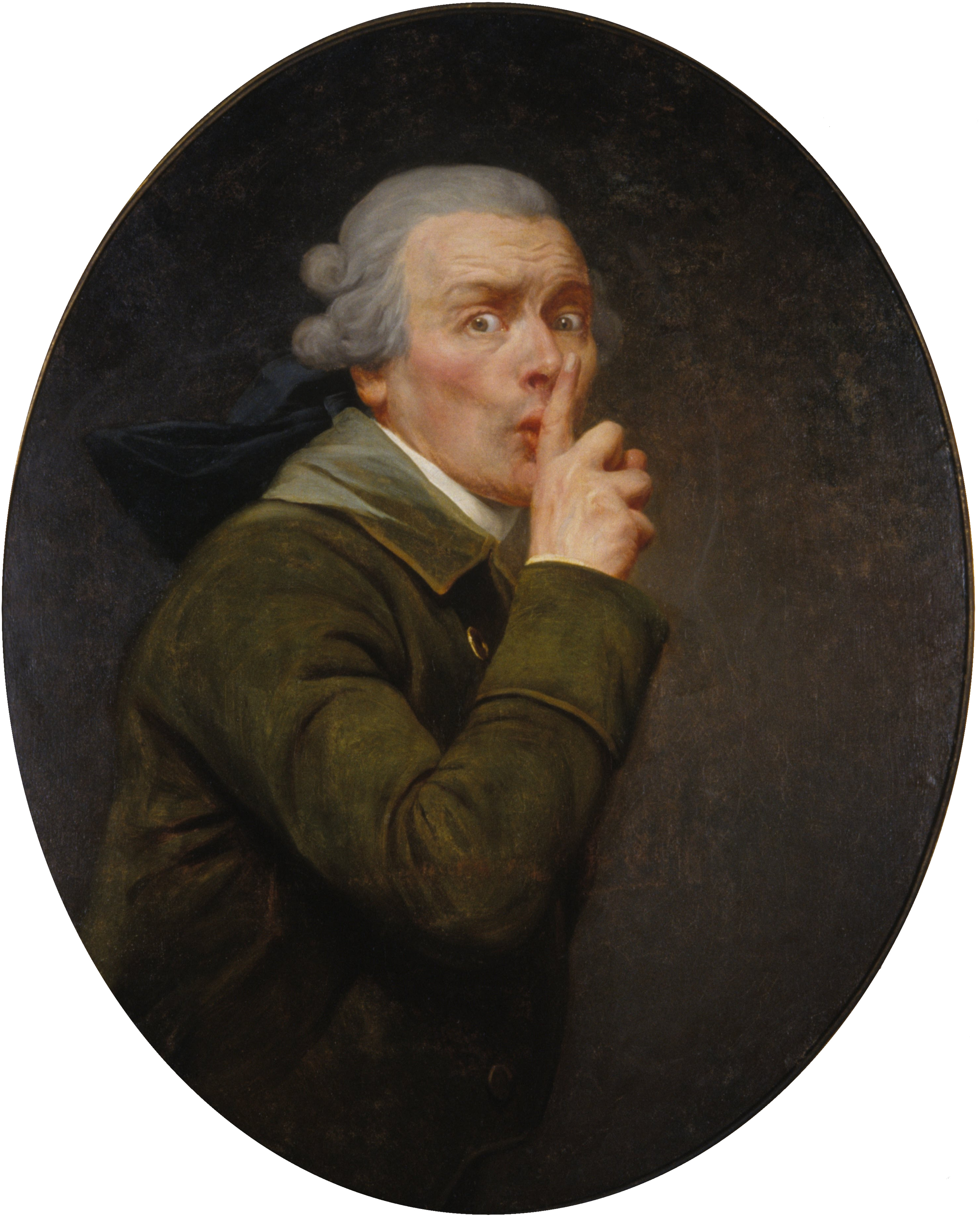
The Discreet One

Ducreux had the following children:

- Rose-Adélaïde (Paris, 1761 – Saint-Domingue, 26 July 1802) was a painter, pastelist and musician.
- Emmanuel (1765 – c. 1812) was initially trained as an artist, but abandoned his art studies to turn to music, becoming a bassoonist at the Théâtre Français in 1789.
- Adrien-Charles (July 1766–January 1776) was a pupil of his father and Greuze.
- Auguste-Joseph Ducreux (1770-1771), died in infancy.
- Alexandre-Jules (1772-1799) was a draughtsman and soldier, was a pupil at the school of the Académie royale de peinture et de sculpture from September 1786, he was a painter of battles; infantry captain at the age of twenty-six, he was attached as army topographer to General-in-Chief Dumouriez. He died shortly after the Battle of Jemmapes.
- Antoinette-Clémence Ducreux (Paris, 13 June 1776 – Vendôme, 11 April 1843), goddaughter of Queen Marie Antoinette. She was a painter of flowers, miniatures, and pastel portraits. In 1801, she married César Maignen de Sainte-Marie, godson of the Duke of Orleans.
- Antoine-Léon Ducreux (1777–1799), a godson of the Duke and Duchess of Feltre, was enrolled as a pupil at the school of the Académie royale de peinture et de sculpture from September 18 June 1792. A painter of flowers, he died in Strasbourg, at his godmother's home.

Ducreux died on 24 July 1802 of an apoplexy on a walk from Paris to Saint-Denis.

== Work ==
Ducreux specialized in portrait painting. Although he cataloged his works in list form from 1760 onward, he rarely signed his paintings. Thus, many of his works may remain erroneously attributed to other artists.

He completed his early portraits in pastel, including those of connoisseurs Pierre-Jean Mariette, the Comte de Caylus and Ange-Laurent de la Live de July. Art historians have suggested that these works may have been copies after De La Tour rather than original work and that the similarity of his work to that of De La Tour derives from this early copying practice.

Ducreux is known for his many self-portraits created between his earliest known Self-portrait as a young man in 1767 and the Self-portrait with natural long hair in 1798. He submitted many of his self-portraits to the annual Salon where they were often met with criticism and mockery because of the extravagant and bizarre poses and facial expressions he adopted in these works. One of these selfin 1783 in which he painted himself in the middle of a large yawn (the Getty Center, Los Angeles). In another, Self-portrait of the artist as a mocker (c. 1793, Louvre), the artist guffaws and points at the viewer.

With these self-portraits Ducreux attempted to break free from the constraints of traditional portraiture. His interest in physiognomy—the belief that a person's outer appearance, especially the shape and lines of their face, could reveal their inner character—influenced him in creating his warm and individualistic works. For example, his portrait The Discreet One (c. 1790) depicts a man with a timorous facial expression pressing his finger against his mouth so as to request discretion or prudence.

In their unusual body language and physical appearance, these portraits evoke the vivacious tronies of 17th-century Dutch and Flemish Baroque painting or the "character heads" of contemporary Austrian sculptor Franz Xaver Messerschmidt (1736–1783), some of whose busts were self-portraits with extreme expressions.

== Internet meme ==
A reproduction of Ducreux's self-portrait Portrait de l'artiste sous les traits d'un moqueur became subject to internet popularity as part of an internet meme in the late 2000s and early 2010s. In the meme, rap and pop song lyrics, common internet phrases, and similar tropes are paraphrased in verbose, stilted, or faux-archaic English and overlaid on top of the portrait to create an image macro.

== Gallery ==
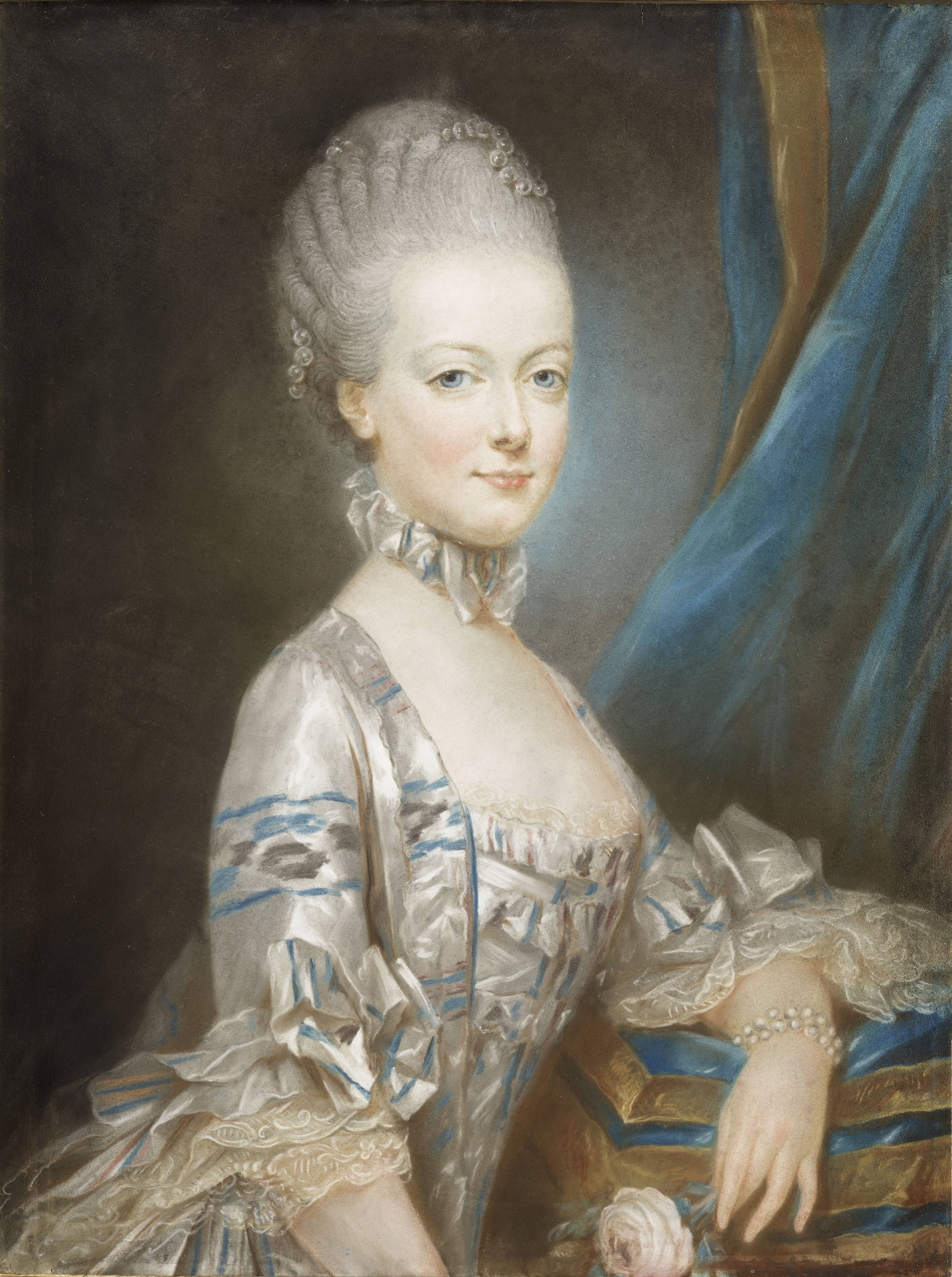
Marie Antoinette, 1769. The portrait was sent to the future king of France Louis XVI, so he could see his bride before they met.

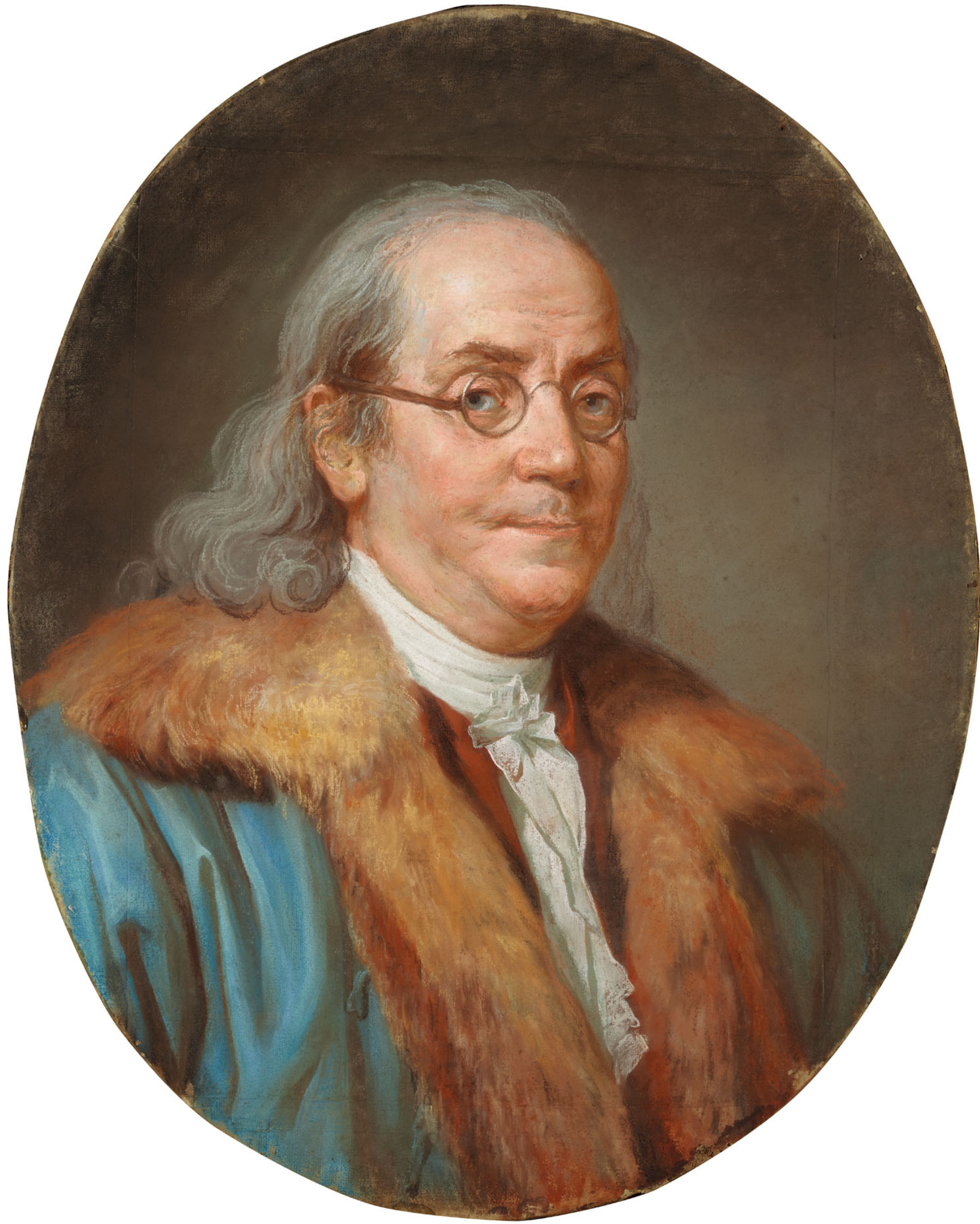
Benjamin Franklin in a blue coat and fur collar, 1777

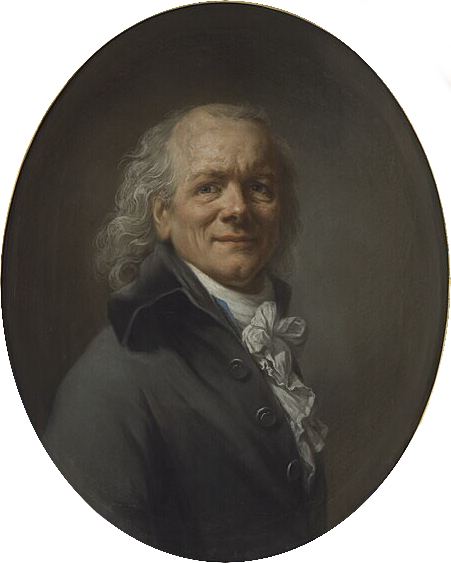
Self-portrait with natural long hair, c. 1798, Louvre

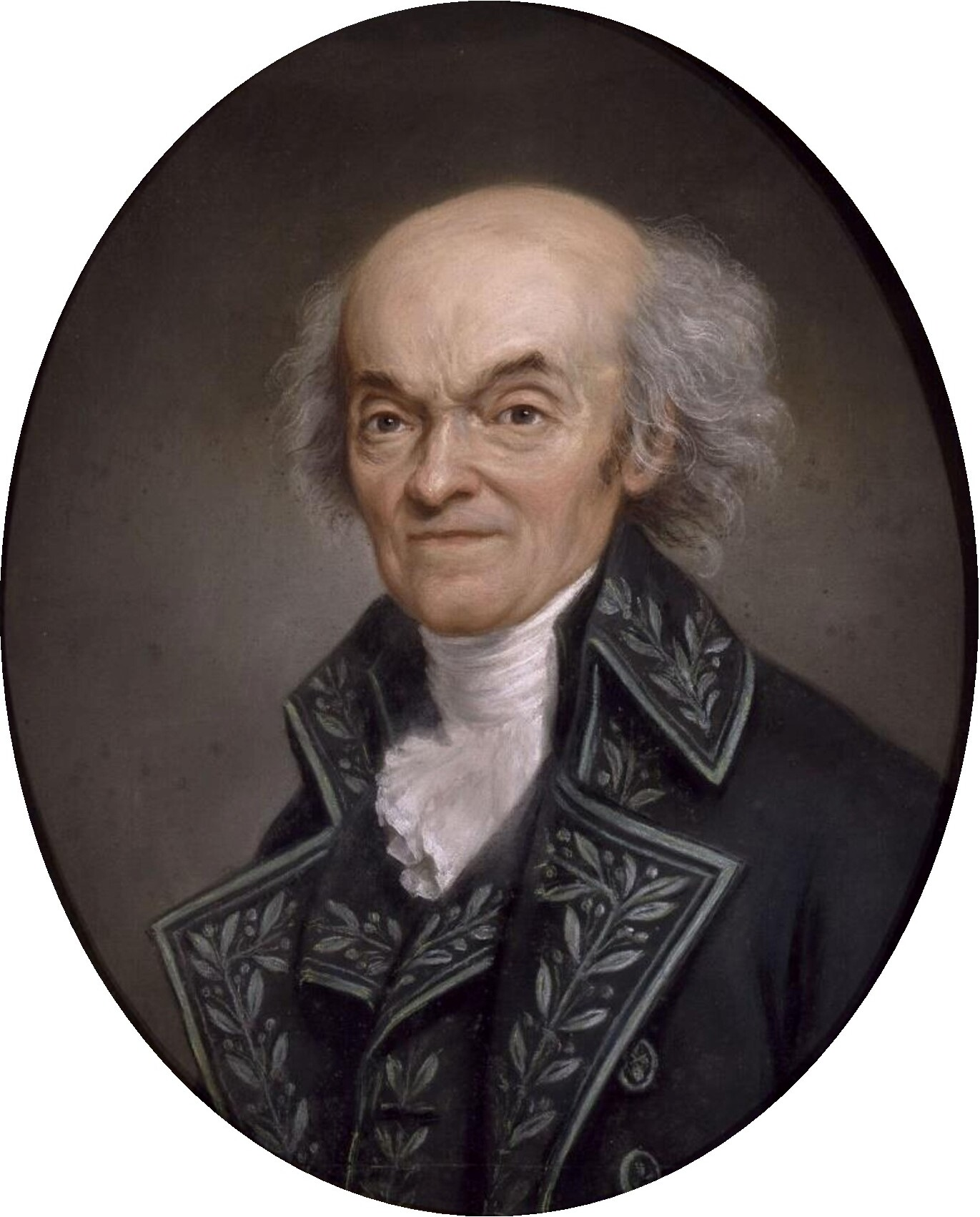
Joseph-Jérôme Lefrançois de Lalande, astronomer, member of the French Academy of Sciences, 1802

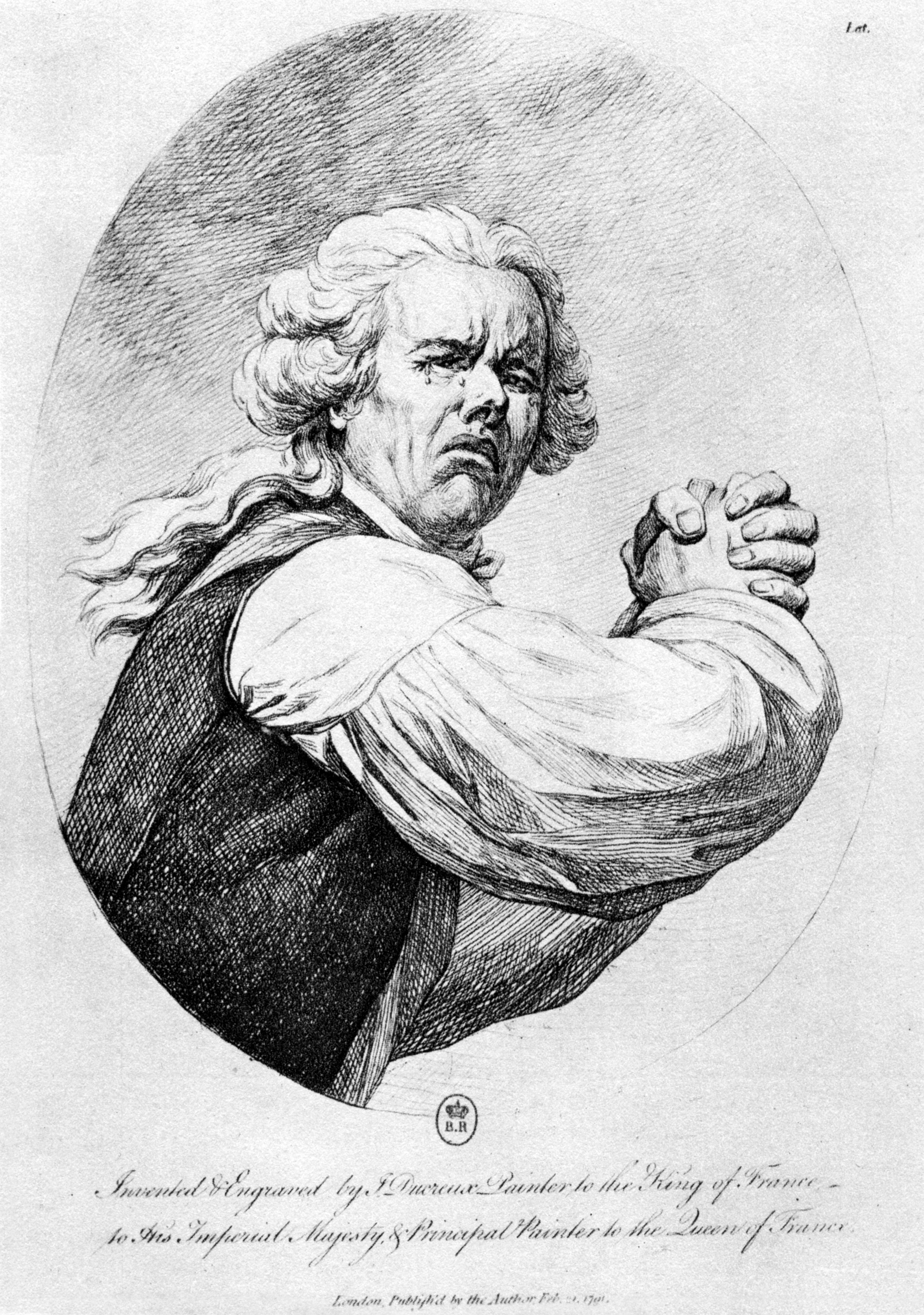
Etching by Ducreux, 1791

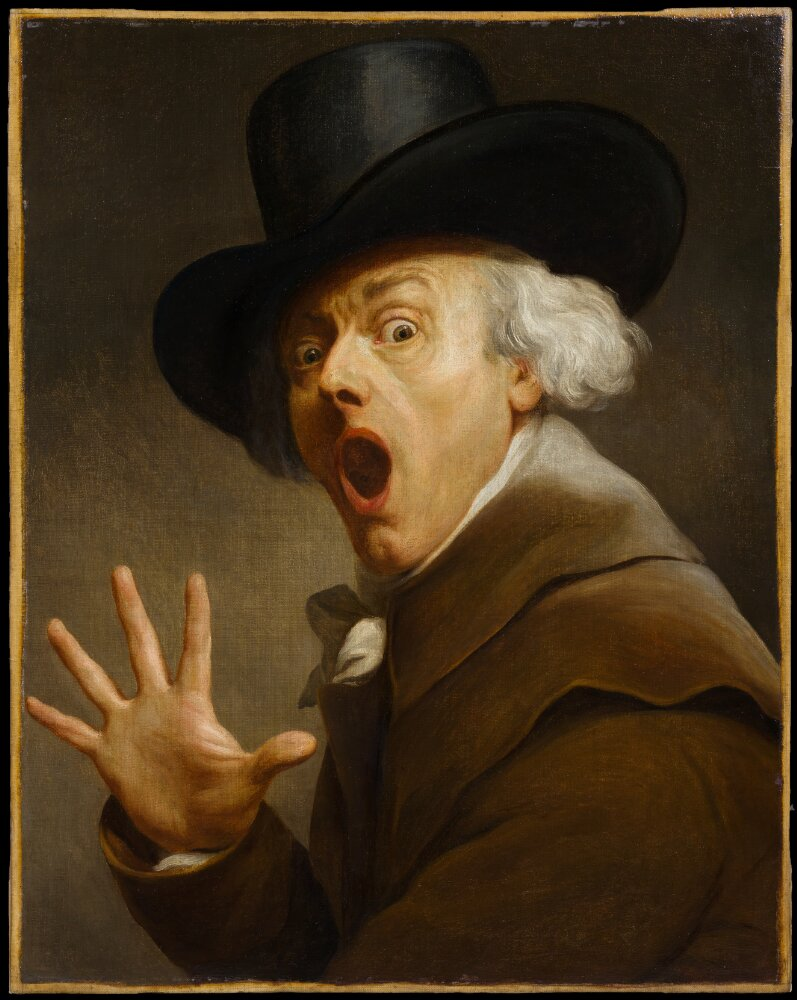
Selfportrait, called La Surprise (The surprise), 1790s, Nationalmuseum, Stockholm

Selfportrait, called Le Silence (The Silence), 1790s, Nationalmuseum, Stockholm
