= Jean-Pierre Duport =

French cellist (1741–1818)

- Birth name: Jean-Pierre Duport
- Born: 27 November 1741
- Died: 31 December 1818 (aged 77)
- Genres: classical
- Occupation: musician
- Instrument: cello

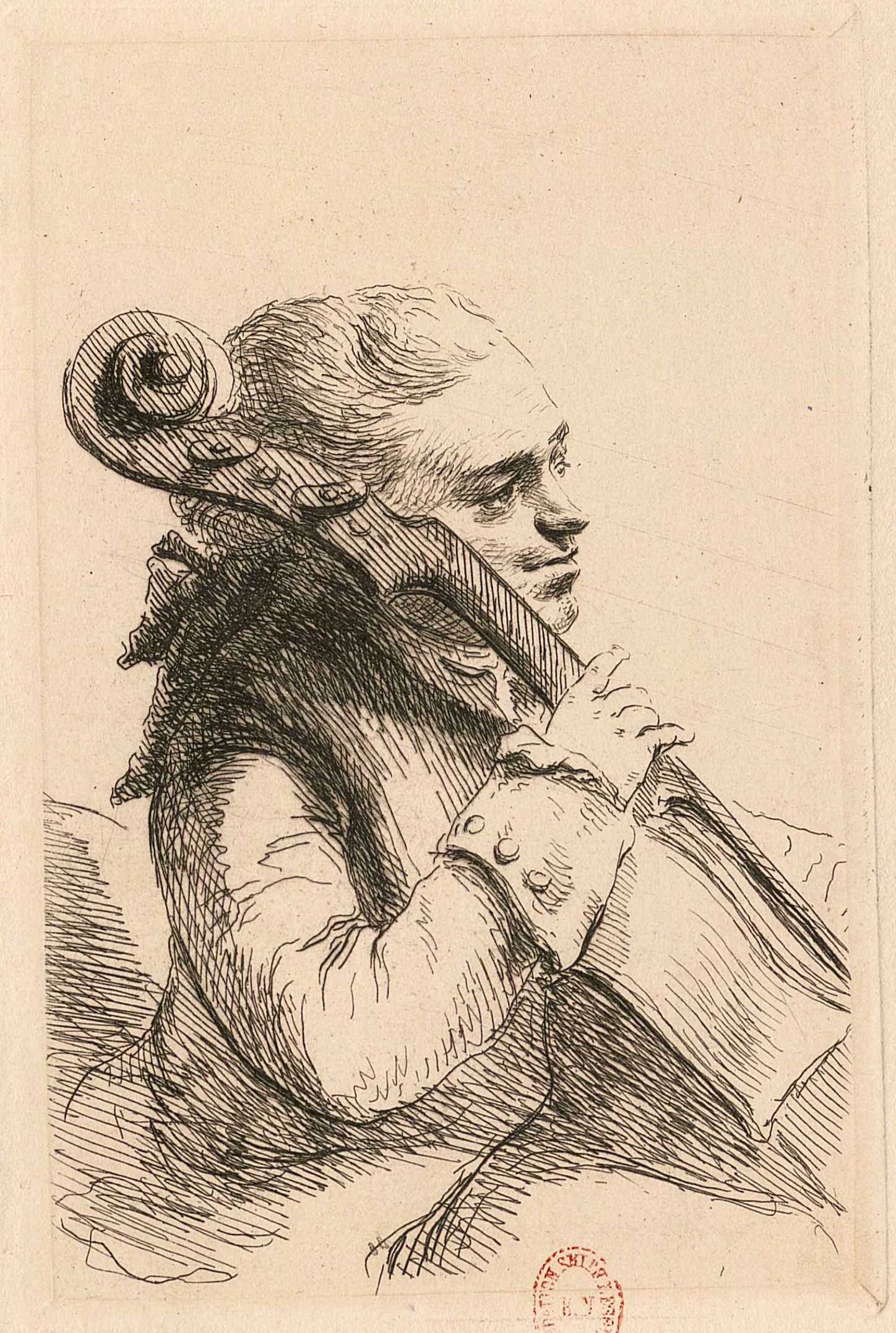
Jean-Pierre Duport

Jean-Pierre Duport (27 November 1741 – 31 December 1818) was a cellist of the late 18th and early 19th centuries. Along with his brother, Jean-Louis Duport (also a cellist), he was active in the musical life of France and Germany. Jean-Pierre was the son of a dancing master, and a student of the founder of the French school of cello playing Martin Berteau (1691–1771).

== Career ==
After studying with Berteau, Jean-Pierre Duport made his debut at the age of 19 at the Concert Spirituel, then the center for non-operatic music in Paris. Between 1766 and 1769 Duport was employed by the Prince of Conti, after which he spent two years in England and two years in Spain. In 1773, Frederick the Great the King of Prussia offered Duport a position as principal cellist of his orchestra, Duport accepted moved from Paris to Berlin. During the 1770s, Duport became one of the cello teachers to the then Prince of Prussia, Friedrich Wilhelm II, and soon after Friedrich Wilhelm II. In 1786 Duport was named as Surintendant de la musique and placed in charge of all chamber music at the court. In 1790, Duport's younger brother Jean-Louis Duport joined him in Berlin, fleeing the French Revolution. Between the two of them, and prominence of the cello playing Friedrich Wilhelm II, Berlin became a "magnet for new compositions for the cello." When Napoleon defeated Friedrich Wilhelm III's army, and captured Berlin in 1806 the Prussian court orchestra was disbanded. Duport remained in Berlin until his death in 1818.

Duport and his younger brother were acquainted with Beethoven: in February 1796 Beethoven had left Vienna for a five-month concert tour which took him to Pest, Prague (accompanied by Prince Lichnowsky, who had travelled there with Mozart in 1789), Dresden, Leipzig, and Berlin, where he was inspired by the high level and quality of musical activity at the court of King Friedrich Wilhelm II of Prussia. Performing at the Marble Palace in Potsdam, Beethoven premiered his work with one of the Duport brothers.
