= Chopin National Edition =

Complete urtext edition of Frédéric Chopin's works

National Edition of the Works of Fryderyk Chopin
- Cover of the first volume (Ballades, 2nd edition)
- Edited by: Jan Ekier, Paweł Kamiński
- Country: Poland
- Language: Polish, English
- Publisher: PWM Edition
- Published: 1967–2010
- Media type: Urtext
- No. of books: 37
- OCLC: 668111267
- Website: www.chopin-nationaledition.com/en/

The National Edition of the Works of Fryderyk Chopin (Polish: Wydanie Narodowe Dzieł Fryderyka Chopina), also known as the Chopin National Edition and the Polish National Edition, is an urtext edition of the complete works by Frédéric Chopin, aiming to present his output in its authentic form.

Started by Jan Ekier in 1959, the entirety of Chopin's known works were published in 37 volumes from 1967 to 2010, accompanied by source and performance commentaries. The Chopin National Edition is considered the authoritative edition of Chopin's works, and is recommended to contestants of the International Chopin Piano Competition.

== History ==
We owe Chopin a debt... His music allowed us to survive the worst moments, and in the periods of hope extols Polish culture all over the world. We owe it to the author to publish his work in the form he intended. This is the goal of the National Edition: to pay off a Nation's debt to Chopin.

— Jan Ekier

In 1959, Jan Ekier started the project of a new critical edition of Chopin's works, as he came to the conclusion that the prevailing Paderewski edition presented a "false image of Chopin's music in many aspects". The first volume of Ballades was published in 1967 by PWM Edition, featuring a minimalist design with white covers. A total of nine volumes were published up to 1991, with a publication rhythm that correlated to each edition of the quinquennial International Chopin Piano Competition.

After the Revolutions of 1989, the edition was re-evaluated from a market perspective. While the first editions were typeset manually and accompanied by Polish commentary only, the new editions were typeset using SCORE, with bilingual (Polish and English) annotations.

In 1998, Ekier established the Foundation for the National Edition of the Works of Fryderyk Chopin, for fundraising, research, publication and promotion of the National Edition. In 2004, he received a special award from the Minister of Culture of Poland, "in recognition of his outstanding contribution to the preservation and popularization of the legacy of Fryderyk Chopin, in particular for the monumental National Edition of his works, restoring to European culture the art of the great Polish composer in a form closest to its historical original."

The edition was completed in 2010, in time for the bicentenary of Chopin's birth.

== Volumes ==
As an urtext, the Chopin National Edition aims to produce a musical text that adheres to the original notation and the composer's intentions. All extant sources were analyzed and verified for authenticity, mainly autographs, first editions with Chopin's corrections and pupils' copies with Chopin's annotations. Necessary editorial decisions are documented in each volume's source commentary. Additionally, a separate performance commentary documents cases where Chopin's notation may be misunderstood by contemporary pianists, such as realizations of ornaments and pedaling.

The Chopin National Edition consists of 36 volumes in two series, for works published during Chopin's lifetime (Series A), and for works published posthumously (Series B). A 37th volume (titled Supplement) consists of compositions partly by Chopin, for instance his contribution to Hexaméron.

Series A: Works published during Chopin's lifetime
No.	Cat.	Contents	PC/SC
1	A I	Ballades	
2	A II	Études	
3	A III	Impromptus	
4	A IV	Mazurkas (A)	
5	A V	Nocturnes	
6	A VI	Polonaises (A)	
7	A VII	Preludes	
8	A VIII	Rondos	
9	A IX	Scherzos	
10	A X	Sonatas	
11	A XI	Waltzes (A)	
12	A XII	Various Works (A)	
13	A XIIIa	Piano Concerto No. 1 (for one piano)	
14	A XIIIb	Piano Concerto No. 2 (for one piano)	
15	A XIVa	Concert works for piano and orchestra (for one piano)	
16	A XIVb	Andante spianato et grande polonaise brillante (for one piano)	
17	A XVa	Variations on "Là ci darem la mano" (score)	
18	A XVb	Piano Concerto No. 1 (historical score)	
19	A XVc	Fantasy on Polish Airs (score)	
20	A XVd	Rondo à la Krakowiak (score)	
21	A XVe	Piano Concerto No. 2 (historical score)	
22	A XVf	Andante spianato et grande polonaise brillante (score)	
23	A XVI	Works for Piano and Cello	
24	A XVII	Piano Trio	

Series B: Works published posthumously
No.	Cat.	Contents	PC/SC
25	B I	Mazurkas (B)	
26	B II	Polonaises (B)	
27	B III	Waltzes (B)	
28	B IV	Various Works (B)	
29	B V	Various Compositions	
30	B VIa	Piano Concerto No. 1 (for two pianos)	
31	B VIb	Piano Concerto No. 2 (for two pianos)	
32	B VII	Concert works for piano and orchestra (for two pianos)	
33	B VIIIa	Piano Concerto No. 1 (concert score)	
34	B VIIIb	Piano Concerto No. 2 (concert score)	
35	B IX	Rondo in C for two pianos, Variations in D for four hands	
36	B X	Songs	

Works partly by Chopin
No.	Contents	PC/SC
37	Supplement	

== Catalogue (WN) ==
The edition provides a new numbering scheme ("WN") for works published after Chopin's death, similar to existing catalogues by Maurice J. E. Brown (B) and Krystyna Kobylańska (KK). Some works have opus numbers assigned after Chopin's death by Julian Fontana, who grouped a number of unpublished piano pieces into eight opus numbers (Op. 66–73), and seventeen songs for voice and piano into a ninth (Op. 74).

WN catalogue
WN	Title	Op. (Fontana)	Completion date	First edition
1	Polonaise in B♭ major		1817	1910
2	Polonaise in G minor		1817	1947
3	Polonaise in A♭ major		1821	1908
4	Polonaise in G♯ minor		1824	1864
5	Variations in D major for 4 hands		1824–26	1965
6	Variations in E major		1824	1851
7	Mazurka in B♭ major		1826	1851
8	Mazurka in G major		1826	1851
9	Funeral march in C minor	72 No. 2	1826	1855
10	Polonaise in B♭ minor		1826	1881
11	Polonaise in D minor	71 No. 1	1825–27	1855
12	Polonaise in F minor	71 No. 3	1826–28 (–29?)	1855
13	1. Ecossaise in G major 2. Ecossaise in D♭ major 3. Ecossaise in D major	72 No. 3/2; 72 No. 3/3; 72 No. 3/1	1826 (1830?)	1855
14	Mazurka in A minor	68 No. 2	1827	1855
(op. 4)	Sonata in C minor		1827/28	1851
15	Rondo in C major for 2 pianos	73	1828	1855
16	Warianty ("Variants") (Souvenir de Paganini)		1829	1881
17	Polonaise in B♭ major	71 No. 2	1829	1855
17a	Mazurka in G major (Song: "Jakież kwiaty, jakie wianki")		1829	
18	Waltz in E major		1829	1861
19	Waltz in B minor	69 No. 2	1829	1852
20	Waltz in D♭ major	70 No. 3	1829	1855
21	"Życzenie"	74 No. 1	1829 (about)	1857
22	"Gdzie lubi"	74 No. 5	1829 (about)	1859
23	Nocturne in E minor	72 No. 1	1827(?)–30	1855
24	Mazurka in C major	68 No. 1	1830	1855
25	Mazurka in F major	68 No. 3	1830	1855
26	Mazurka in G major	67 No. 1	1830 (1835?)	1855
27	Contredans		1830 (1827?)	1948
28	Waltz in A♭ major		1829–30	1902
29	Waltz in E minor		1830 (?)	1868
30	"Poseł"	74 No. 7	1830	1859
31	"Czary"		1830 (?)	1951
32	"Hulanka"	74 No. 4	1830	1859
33	"Precz z moich oczu"	74 No. 6	1830	1853
34	"Wojak"	74 No. 10	1830	1857
35	Polonaise in G♭ major		1830	1869–70 (about 1859?)
36	[Allegretto]		1829–31	1990
37	Lento con gran espressione (Nocturne in C♯ minor)		1830	1875
38	"Piosnka litewska"	74 No. 16	1830 (1831?)	1859
39	"Smutna rzeka"	74 No. 3	1831	1859
40	"Narzeczony"	74 No. 15	1831	1859
41	Mazurka in B♭ major		1832	1953
42	Waltz in G♭ major	70 No. 1	1832	1855
43	Cantabile		1834	1955
44	Presto con leggierezza (Prelude in A♭ major)		1834	1919
45	Mazurka in A♭ major		1834	1930
46	Impromptu in C♯ minor (Fantaisie-Impromptu)	66	1834 (about)	1855
47	Waltz in A♭ major	69 No. 1	1835	1855
48	Mazurka in C major	67 No. 3	1835	1855
49	"Leci liście z drzewa"	74 No. 17	1836	1873
50	"Pierścień"	74 No. 14	1836	1859
51	"Moja pieszczotka"	74 No. 12	1837	1859
52	"Wiosna"	74 No. 2	1838	1859
52a	"Wiosna" for piano		1838	1990
53	Sostenuto (Waltz in E♭ major)		1840	1955
54	"Śliczny chłopiec"	74 No. 8	1841	1859
55	Waltz in F minor	70 No. 2	1841	1852
56	Moderato <Kartka z albumu> (Leaf from the album)		1843	1912
57	"Nie ma, czego trzeba"	74 No. 13	1845	1859
58	"Dwojaki koniec"	74 No. 11	1845	1859
59	Gallop Marquis		1846–47	1990
60	Mazurka in A minor	67 No. 4	1846–47	1855
61	"Z gór, gdzie dźwigali" <"Melodia"> (Melody)	74 No. 9	1847	1859
62	Nocturne in C minor		1847–48	1938
63	Waltz in A minor		1847–49	1955
64	Mazurka in G minor	67 No. 2	1848–49	1855
65	Mazurka in F minor	68 No. 4	1849	1855 (partly) 1965 (full)

== Reception ==
Reception of the National Edition has been positive. Paul Badura-Skoda called it "the best available Chopin edition made with extreme care and precision". Jim Samson wrote that "by far the best of the modern editions is Jan Ekier's Polish National. Ekier does work with well thought-through editorial principles and his text comes closer than any other to a faithful reproduction of a single ('best') source." According to Frans Brüggen, the edition "seems to be very trustworthy. Having compared all the different sources available, Professor Ekier was able to make good editorial decisions."
