= Chopin's compositions for piano and orchestra =

Title page of Vol. XII of the 19th-century complete edition of Chopin's works: the volume contains Chopin's compositions for piano and orchestra

Frédéric Chopin's compositions for piano and orchestra originated from the late 1820s to the early 1830s, and comprise three concert pieces he composed 1827–1828, while a student at the Central School of Music in Warsaw, two piano concertos, completed and premièred between finishing his studies (mid 1829) and leaving Poland (late 1830), and later drafts, resulting in two more published works. Among these, and the other works in the brilliant style which Chopin composed in this period, the concertos are the most accomplished ones.

== Context ==
Together with a number of rondos (Opp. 1, 5, 16 and 73), the Polonaise brillante (Op. 3), the Variations brillantes in B♭ major on "Je vends des scapulaires" Op. 12, and the Grande valse brillante, Chopin's compositions for piano and orchestra belong to a group of compositions in brilliant style, no longer confined by the tenets of the Classical period, which were written for the concert stage in the late 1820s to early 1830s. Other compositions of the same period, such as the Sonata (Op. 4) and the Trio (Op. 8), kept closer to a classical approach, or had a more limited scope, for example the Nocturnes (Op. 9), and were rather intended for private performance.

The circumstances in which Chopin composed and premièred his works for piano and orchestra before leaving Poland in late 1830 are to a large extent documented in his letters to Tytus Woyciechowski.

=== Student years and first visit to Vienna ===
In September 1828, while a student of Józef Elsner at Warsaw's Central School of Music, Chopin visited Berlin. Chopin graduated in July 1829. The next month, he visited Vienna, where he successfully presented the Variations on "Là ci darem la mano" and the Rondo à la Krakowiak in concert.

=== Piano concertos ===
Chopin premièred his F minor and E minor piano concertos in Warsaw in 1830.

=== Leaving Poland ===
Chopin left Poland on 2 November 1830, travelling to Vienna.

== Compositions ==
Chronologically:

- Variations on "Là ci darem la mano" in B♭ major (1827), Op. 2.
- Fantasy on Polish Airs, in A major (1828), Op. 13.
- Rondo à la Krakowiak, in F major (1828), Op. 14.
- Piano Concerto No. 2 in F minor (1829–1830), Op. 21.
- Piano Concerto No. 1 in E minor (1830), Op. 11.
- Grande polonaise brillante (1830–1831), in 1834 expanded with an introductory Andante spianato for solo piano, and a fanfare-like transition to the earlier composition, together published as Op. 22.
- Drafts for more concertos, ultimately resulting in the Allegro de Concert for solo piano (1832–41), Op. 46.

== Reception ==
Contemporary press reported on Chopin's concert performances, in Vienna and Warsaw, of his works for piano and orchestra.

== Sources ==
- Niecks, Frederick (1888). Frederick Chopin: As a Man and Musician. Novello, Ewer & Co.
  Volume I
  Volume II
- Rink, John (1997). Chopin: The Piano Concertos. Cambridge University Press. ISBN 0521446600.
