= Miscellaneous compositions (Chopin) =

Various works by Frédéric Chopin

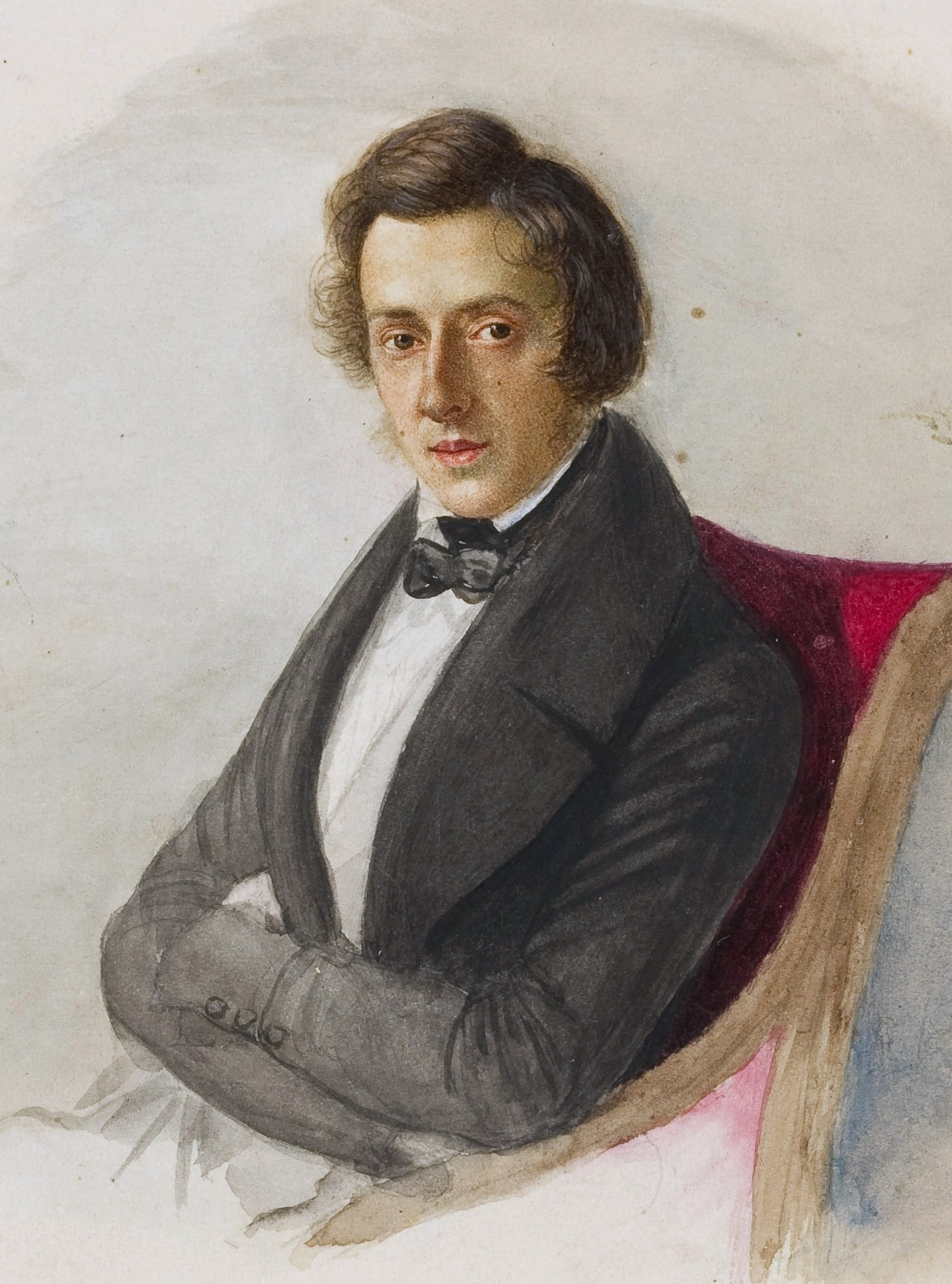
Chopin at 25, by Maria Wodzińska, 1835

Frédéric Chopin's output mostly consists of pieces for solo piano. There are also six works for piano and orchestra (two of which are piano concertos), and a small amount of chamber music. Some of his standalone works are well-known, such as the Barcarolle in F♯ major, the Fantaisie in F minor, the Berceuse in D♭ major, and some of the 19 Polish songs. Most of the other lesser-known works were published only after his death, contrary to his express wishes that all his unpublished manuscripts should be burned.

While sometimes disregarded in the concert repertoire (particularly the posthumously published works), most of these miscellaneous works have been recorded, in some cases numerous times.

== Posthumous opus numbers and other catalogue designations ==
Chopin expressed a death-bed wish that all his unpublished manuscripts be destroyed. However, at the request of the composer's mother and sisters, Julian Fontana selected 23 unpublished piano pieces and grouped them into eight posthumous opus numbers (Opp. 66–73). These works were published in 1855, and include in order: Fantaisie-Impromptu, 4 mazurkas, 4 mazurkas, 2 waltzes, 3 waltzes, 3 polonaises, a nocturne, a Marche funèbre, 3 écossaises, and a rondo. In 1857, 17 of Chopin's Polish songs were published as Op. 74.

Various other works have been subsequently published, but have not been given opus numbers. They are identified by alternative numbers from the catalogues of:

- Maurice J. E. Brown (B),
- Krystyna Kobylańska (KK), and
- Józef Michał Chomiński (A, C, D, E, P, S).

== Extant miscellaneous works ==
Title	Forces*	Key	Composed	Published	Opus	Brown	Kobylańska	Chominski	Notes
Album Leaf (Feuille d'album); Moderato		E major	1843	1910		B. 151	KK. IVb/12		
Allegretto and Mazurka		A major, D minor					KK. VIIb/7-8		MS sold Paris 21 November 1974. Manuscript in Chopin's hand has "Copié par Chopin" inscribed, implying these are both folk tunes. The Allegretto was used in Liszt's Glanes de Woronince, S249. These two little pieces were not recorded until 1992
Allegro de concert		A major	1832–41	1841	Op. 46	B. 72			Originally intended to be a third piano concerto
Andante spianato		G major	1834	1836	Op. 22	B. 88			Solo piano introduction to the Grande Polonaise
Andantino		G minor	*	1968		B. 117			An arrangement for solo piano of the song Wiosna; * 5 MS exist whose dates range from April 1838 to 1 September 1848
Barcarolle		F♯ major	1846	1846	Op. 60	B. 158			
Berceuse		D♭ major	1844	1845	Op. 57	B. 154			
Bolero		C major / A minor	1833	1834	Op. 19	B. 81			
Two Bourrées		G major, A major	1846	1968		B. 160b	KK. VIIb/1-2		
Canon		F minor	1839	1948		B. 129b	KK. IVc/1		Fragment. A modified version is found in the final movement of his cello sonata
Cantabile (Klavierstück)		B♭ major	1834	1931		B. 84	KK. IVb/6	P. 2/6	
Three Écossaises		D major, G major, D♭ major	1826	1855	Op. posth. 72/3	B. 12			
Fantaisie		F minor	1841	1841	Op. 49	B. 137			
Fugue		A minor	1841–42	1898		B. 144	KK. IVc/2		
3 Fugues		A minor, F major, D minor					KK. VIIa/2		Arr. from Cherubini's Cours de contrepoint et de fugue. D minor arrangement is incomplete
Galopp		A♭ major	1846	1990			KK. IVb/13	P. 2/13	Galop Marquis
Introduction et Variations brillantes sur le Rondeau favori "Je vends des scapulaires" from Hérold's Ludovic		B♭ major	1833	1833	Op. 12	B. 80			
Largo (Klavierstück)		E♭ major	1837	1938		B. 109	KK. IVb/5	P. 2/5	Harmonization of the national anthem of (Congress) Kingdom of Poland - "Pieśń narodowa za pomyślność Króla" ("National Anthem for the King's Prosperity") from 1816
Marche funèbre		C minor	1827	1855	Op. posth. 72/2	B. 20			
Mazurek Dąbrowskiego Harmonization		B♭ major	1835 (2 September)				KK. Ve/4		Contains only the refrain. Reconstruction of anthem's verse done by Mariusz Dubaj
17 Polish songs	Voice and piano		1827–47	1857	Op. posth. 74	various	various		
3 Polish songs	Voice (and piano)		1829 (22 August), 1830, 1840	1856 (Warsaw), 1910 (Leipzig), 1910 (Lviv)		B. 39, 51, 132	KK. IVa/9, IVa/11, IVb/9		Jakież kwiaty (voice part only), Czary, Dumka
Sostenuto (Klavierstück)		E♭ major	1840	1955		B. 133	KK. IVb/10	P. 2/10	Marked simply "Sostenuto"; sometimes classified as a Waltz (no. 18)
Tarantelle		A♭ major	1841	1841	Op. 43	B. 139			
Variation No. 6 for Hexameron		E major	1837	1839		B. 113	KK. IIb/2		Collaborative work
Variations on an Irish National Air (from Thomas Moore)	Piano 4-hands	D major	1826	1965		B. 12a	KK. IVa/6	P. 1/6	Also known as Introduction, Theme and Variations in D on a Venetian air; Variations sur le Carnaval de Venise. First page for secondary pianist and last page for principal pianist were lost. Various reconstructions exist
Variations on the air "Der Schweizerbub"		E major	1826	1851		B. 14	KK. IVa/4		a.k.a. Introduction et Variations sur un Lied allemand
Variations in A, Souvenir de Paganini		A major	1829	1881		B. 37	KK. IVa/10		

- * All for piano solo except where otherwise indicated.

== Lost, destroyed, unavailable, doubtful and spurious works ==
There remain a number of works whose manuscripts are lost, destroyed, or unavailable to researchers; or whose authenticity is doubtful or spurious.

Title	Forces*	Key	Composed	Published	Brown	Kobylańska	Chominski	Status and Notes
Allegretto (Mazurka)		F♯ major	1829 (?)	1990		KK. Anh. II/1		Spurious; found in Leopoldyna Blahetka's album. Oskar Kolberg opinned main theme and development are Chopin's. Long version confirmed by Charles Mayer (Souvenir de Pologne, Mazurka Op. 112). Abridged Allegretto is a short version reconstruction of selected measures believed Chopin's from Op. 112 by Jan Ekier - 1990 Chopin National Edition (WN 36)
Andante dolente		B♭ minor	1827			KK. Vb/1		Lost; copy of first line made by Chopin's sister Ludwika is extant
Casta Diva transcription for piano (and voice)		E major	1831 (?)			KK. VIIa/1	D. 1/1	Based on Bellini's Casta Diva (solo piano arrangement possibly spurious)
Contredanse		G♭ major	1827	1934	B. 17	KK. Anh. Ia/4	A. 1/4	While accepted by the Chopin National Edition (WN 27), authenticity not universally recognized. The sole MS is not in Chopin's hand
Écossaise		E♭ major				KK. Ve/3		Lost; two écossaises were in the hands of Oskar Kolberg. Kolberg's letter contains an incipit 6 measures long of the right hand
Écossaise		B♭ major	1827			KK. Vb/9		Lost; copy of first line made by Chopin's sister Ludwika is extant. It seems this piece is different from the two écossaises belonging to Oskar Kolberg
3 Marches		C minor, B♭ minor, F minor				KK. Vd/1-3		Lost; perhaps includes the Marche funèbre in C minor, Op. posth. 72/2 and the Andante dolente in B♭ minor
Marches			"early"			KK. Vf		Lost
Mazurka		B♭ minor				KK. Anh. Ib/1 (Anh. Ia/8 in earlier sources)		Doubtful; found in an album by Walerian Stopnicki held in Jan Tomasz Stopnicki's private collection in Warsaw, according to the catalogue of Krystyna Kobylańska. Only an incipit seven measures long has been published
Mazurka						KK. Ve/8		Lost; mentioned in 1878 correspondence between Breitkopf & Härtel and Izabela Barcińska
Mazurka						KK. Ve/6		Lost; mentioned in a note from Augener to C.A. Spina 21 May 1884. Dedicated to Mme Nicolai
Mazurka (Mazurek)		D major	1820 (?)	1910	B. 4	KK. Anh. Ia/1	A. 1/1	Doubtful; available
Mazurka		D major	1826			KK. Ve/5		Referred to in literature but the MS is unknown
Mazurka			1832			KK. Vc/2		Lost; mentioned in a letter from Chopin dated 10 September 1832
Mazurka			1832 (14 September)			KK. Ve/7		Listed in an auction catalogue, Paris, 1906
Mazurkas (several)			"early"			KK. Vf		Lost
Mazurka			by December 1846			KK. Vc/4		Lost; mentioned in a letter from Chopin
Military March	??		1817			KK. Vd/4		Lost; scoring for military band not by Chopin; dedicated to the Grand Duke Konstantin Pavlovich
Nocturne (No. 22) a.k.a. Nocturne oublié(e)		C♯ minor				KK. Anh. Ia/6	A. 1/6	Spurious
Polonaises (several)			"early"			KK. Vf		Lost
2 Polonaises			1818					Lost; presented on 26 September 1818 to the Empress Maria Fyodorovna, mother of Tsar Alexander I of Russia, on the occasion of her visit to Warsaw
Polonaise			1825			KK. Vf		Lost; on themes by Rossini (The Barber of Seville) and Spontini; mentioned in a letter from Chopin dated November 1825. It was reported to be in the lost album of Izabela Grabowska (source: Aleksander Koptiajew)
Polonaise			1831 (by July)			KK. Vc/1		Lost; mentioned in a letter from Chopin to his family
Polonaise			1832			KK. Vc/3		Lost; mentioned in a letter from Chopin dated 10 September 1832
Prelude and Andantino animato		F major, D minor		1930		KK. Anh. Ia/2-3	A. 1/2-3	Doubtful; only 4 and 5 measures have surfaced for each piece, respectively. Origin of Prelude is unknown. Andantino manuscript is not in Chopin's hand
2 sacred works	??		by 1846			KK. Va/1-2		Lost; includes Veni Creator
Sonata	Piano four-hands		1835			KK. Vc/5		Lost; mentioned in a letter from Chopin to Breitkopf
Song Płótno	Voice and piano					KK. Vd/5		Lost
Song	Voice and piano		1841 (January)			KK. Vc/10		Lost; mentioned in a letter from Chopin on 9 January 1841
3 songs	Voice and piano					KK. Vd/6-8		Lost
6 songs	Voice and piano					KK. Anh. Ic/1-6		Doubtful
4 songs	Voice and ??	A minor, F major, F minor, G major	1840–47 (?)		B. 140b	various		Only fragments for voice parts remain
Variations			1818 (January)			KK. Ve/9		Lost
Variations	Piano 4-hands or 2 pianos	F major	1826			KK. Vb/2		Lost; copy of first line made by Chopin's sister Ludwika is extant
Variations on "Non più mesta" from Rossini's La Cenerentola	Flute and piano	E major	1824	1955	B. 9	KK. Anh. Ia/5	A. 1/5	This work has been attributed to Chopin, but is generally considered spurious. Perhaps a collaborative work with the flautist Józef Cichocki
Variations on a Ukrainian Dumka by Antoni Radziwill	Violin and piano		1830			KK. VIIa/3		Lost
Waltz		E♭ major	1826–27	1902	B. 46	KK. IVa/14	P. 1/14	Manuscript lost, though music available listed as waltz no. 17. Not accepted as authentic by the Fryderyk Chopin Institute
Waltz (Valse mélancolique)		F♯ minor	1838	1932		KK. Anh. Ib/7 (formally Anh. Ia/7)	A. 1/7	Not by Chopin; first published in 1861, and in 1986 published under the name Valse mélancolique by Stanislaw Dybowski on the bi-weekly "Ruch Muzyczny", but in 2012 discovered by Luca Chierici to be a shortened version of a piece by Charles Mayer named Le Régret, Op. 332
Waltz		C major	1824 (1831?)			KK. Vb/8		MS destroyed; copy of first line made by Chopin's sister Ludwika is extant
Waltz		A minor	1824			KK. Vf		Lost; it was reported to be in Izabela Grabowska's lost album. "A delicious waltz dedicated to Countess Lubienska" (source: Aleksander Koptiajew)
Waltz		C major	1826			KK. Vb/3		MS destroyed; copy of first line made by Chopin's sister Ludwika is extant
Waltz		A♭ major	1827			KK. Vb/4		MS destroyed; copy of first line made by Chopin's sister Ludwika is extant
Waltz (La Partenza)		D minor	1828			KK. Vb/6		MS destroyed; copy of first line made by Chopin's sister Ludwika is extant
Waltz		A minor	1829 (?)		B. 40b			Sketches for a brief prelude and main theme, discovered 1937; was in possession of H. Hinterberger of Vienna. Now believed destroyed
Waltz		A♭ major	1829–30			KK. Vb/5		MS destroyed; copy of first line made by Chopin's sister Ludwika is extant. Mentioned in a letter from Chopin to his family, 21 December 1830
Waltz		E♭ major	1829–30			KK. Vb/7		MS destroyed; copy of first line made by Chopin's sister Ludwika is extant. Mentioned in letters from Breitkopf to Izabela Barcińska in 1878
Waltz			by 1845			KK. Ve/12		Lost; mentioned in diary of L. Niedźwiecki
Waltz		B major	1848 (12 October)		B. 166	KK. Va/3		According to a letter of Arthur Hedley (March 10, 1960), MS in private hands (London) and unavailable
Waltz		B♭ major	1849					Discovered 1952; Arthur Hedley claimed to have seen it in a private English collection, according to Jeffrey Kallberg
Waltz						KK. Ve/10		Listed in an auction catalogue, Paris, March 1906
Waltz						KK. Ve/11		Lost; mentioned in letters from Breitkopf to Izabela Barcińska in 1878
Waltzes (several)						KK. Vf		Lost. There exists a little fragment of what may be a G♭ major waltz (1847?) found on a sketch of Waltz Op. 64/1
Several works	Violin and piano							Lost. Several of them were found in Izabela Grabowska's lost album
2 works	Aeolopantaleon					KK. Ve/1-2		Lost. Notes and research on these pieces are found among others in "Jeszcze raz o dwóch nieznanych kompozycjach Chopina na eolipantalion" by Benjamin Vogel (1985)

- * For piano solo unless otherwise indicated.
