= Mazurkas (Chopin) =

Series of piano compositions by Frédéric Chopin

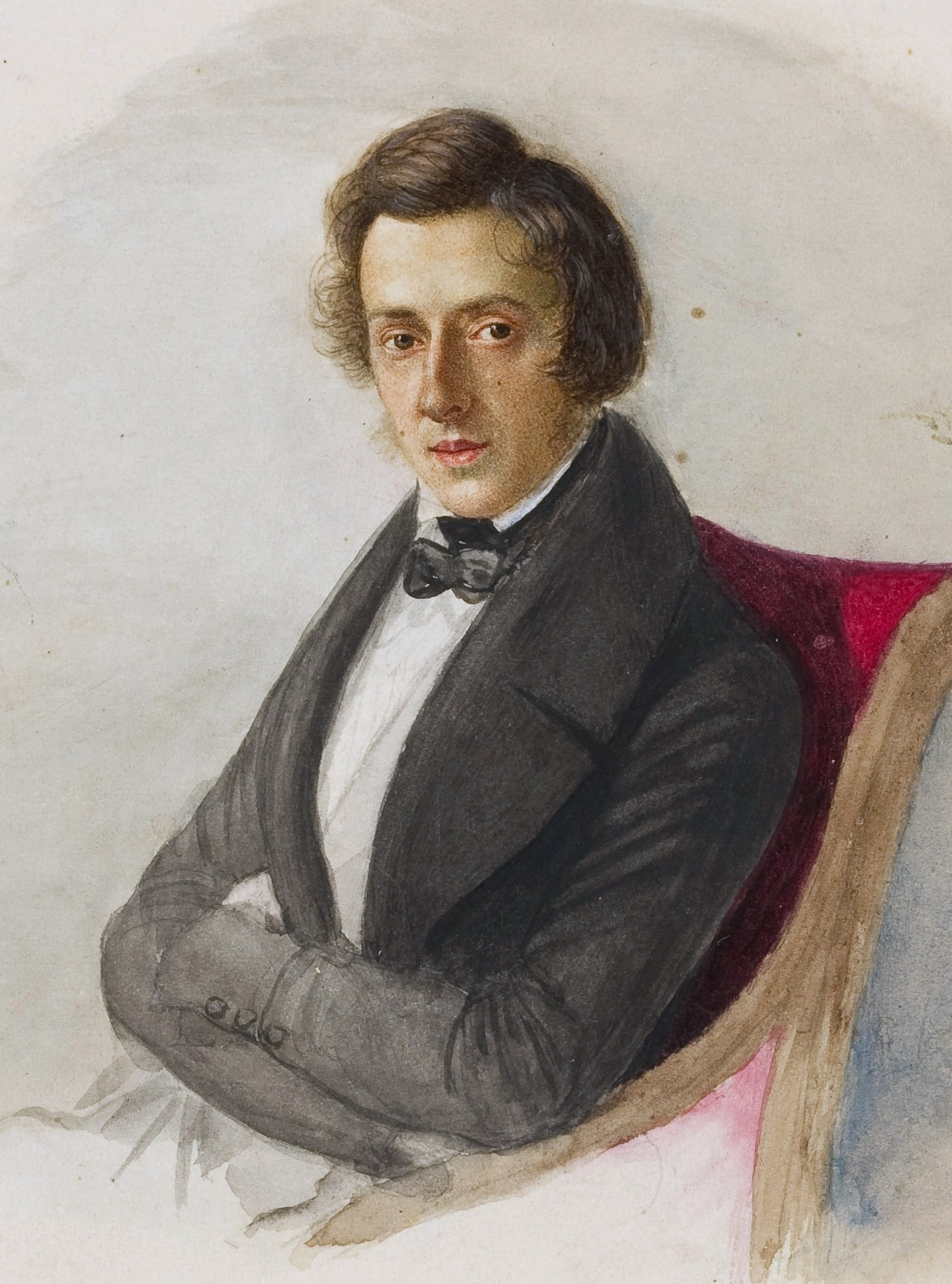
Frédéric Chopin at 25, by his fiancée Maria Wodzińska, 1835

Over the years 1824–1849, Frédéric Chopin wrote at least 58 compositions for piano called Mazurkas, making the set the most extensive of his genres. Of the 58 that have been published:

- 45 were during Chopin's lifetime, of which 41 have opus numbers (with the remaining four works being two early mazurkas from 1826 and the "Notre Temps" and "Émile Gaillard" mazurkas that were published individually in 1841)
- 13 are posthumous, of which 8 have posthumous opus numbers (specifically, Opp. 67 & 68)

Besides these (and some miscellaneous compositions containing elements of a mazurka), 12 further mazurkas are known whose manuscripts are either doubtful/spurious (3, one of which is in private hands) or untraced (at least 9).

The serial numbering of the 58 published mazurkas normally goes up to only 51. The remaining 7 are referred to by their key or catalogue number.

Chopin's composition of these mazurkas signaled new ideas of nationalism.

Frédéric Chopin: Mazurka, Op. 17, No. 4, for piano
Performed by: Giorgi Latso, piano

== Origin and Musical style ==
Chopin derived the mazurka form from one of the traditional Polish dances while transforming them into an entirely new genre, one that became known as a "Chopin genre". Some characteristics of the genre remain the same in his interpretation. For example, both the traditional mazurka and Chopin's version contain a great deal of repetition. This can mean repetition of a single measure or small group of measures, a theme, or even an entire section, most common in traditional mazurka dancing. Even though Chopin did not compose his mazurkas so they could be danced to, it is clear Chopin kept the original form in mind. Furthermore, many of the rhythmic patterns of the traditional mazurka also appear in Chopin's, conveying the idea of a dance, yet as a more "self-contained, stylized dance piece." In keeping with this idea, Chopin did try to make his mazurkas more technically interesting by furthering their chromaticism and harmony, along with using classical techniques, most notably chorales and elements of counterpoint including fugues and canons. In fact, Chopin used more classical techniques in his mazurkas than in any of his other genres.

== Influences ==
While it is known that Chopin's mazurkas are connected to the traditional dance, throughout the years there has been much scholarly debate as to how exactly they are connected. The main subject of this debate is whether Chopin had an actual direct connection to Polish folk music, or whether he heard Polish national music in urban areas that inspired him to compose his mazurkas.

In 1852, three years after Chopin's death, Franz Liszt published a piece about Chopin's mazurkas, saying that Chopin had been directly influenced by Polish national music to compose them. Liszt also provided descriptions of specific dance scenes, which were not completely accurate, but were "a way to raise the status of these [mazurkas]." While Liszt's claim was inaccurate, the actions of scholars who read his writing proved to be more disastrous. When reading Liszt's work, scholars interpreted the word "national" as "folk," creating the "longest standing myth in Chopin criticism—the myth that Chopin's mazurkas are national works rooted in an authentic Polish-folk music tradition." In fact, the most likely explanation for Chopin's influence is the national music he was hearing as a young man in urban areas of Poland, such as Warsaw.

== Arrangements ==
The soprano and composer Pauline Viardot was a close friend of Chopin and his lover George Sand. She made a number of arrangements of his mazurkas as songs, with his full agreement. He gave Viardot expert advice on these arrangements, as well as on her piano playing and her other vocal compositions. Chopin in turn derived from her some firsthand knowledge about Spanish music.

Several arrangements were made for piano and cello by Auguste Franchomme, a friend of Chopin who collaborated with him to compose the Grand Duo concertant, and was also the dedicatee of his Cello Sonata.

The violinist Fritz Kreisler arranged the Mazurka No. 45 in A minor, Op. 67 No. 4, for violin and piano.

== List of mazurkas ==
Series number	Key	Composed	Published	Opus No.	Brown	Kobylańska	Chomiński	Dedication	Notes
–	G, B♭	1826	1826	–	B. 16	KK IIa/2-3	S. 1/2		Revised versions (original versions were published in 1875)
1–4	f♯, c♯, E, e♭	1830	1832	Op. 6	B. 60		C. 51–54	Countess Pauline Plater	Jan Ekier's urtext edition places Op. 7 No. 5 as Op. 6 No. 5
5–9	B♭, a, f, A♭, C	1830–31	1832	Op. 7	B. 61		C. 55–59	M. Johns de la Nouvelle-Orléans	Nos. 2 and 4 are revised versions (original versions are B. 45 and 7, respectively); the original version of No. 4 was published in 1902. No. 5, the only piece explicitly marked "senza fine" (without end) by Chopin, is listed as Op. 6 No. 5 in Jan Ekier's urtext edition along with performance notes for the finale
10–13	B♭, e, A♭, a	1832–33	1834	Op. 17	B. 77		C. 60–63	Mlle. Lina Freppa	No. 4 may exist in an earlier version from 1824 (B. 8)
14–17	g, C, A♭, b♭	1834–35	1836	Op. 24	B. 89		C. 64–67	Comte de Perthuis	
18–21	c, b, D♭, c♯	1836–37	1837	Op. 30	B. 105		C. 65–71	Princess Maria Czartoryska de Württemberg	
22–25	g♯, D, C, b	1837–38	1838	Op. 33	B. 115		C. 72–75	Countess Roza Mostowska	The mazurkas in C and D were listed as Nos. 2/3 in the first edition of the Mazurkas published by Maurice Schlesinger
27	e	1838 (28 November)	1840	Op. 41/2	B. 122		C. 77	Étienne Witwicki	
26, 28, 29	c♯, B, A♭	1839 (July)	1840	Op. 41/1, 3, 4	B. 126		C. 76, 78, 79	Étienne Witwicki	Some editions place no. 1 as no. 4
50	a	1840 (summer)	1841	–	B. 134	KK IIb/4	S. 2/4		Notre temps; in "Six Morceaux de salon"
51	a	1840	1841	–	B. 140	KK IIb/5	S. 2/5	Émile Gaillard	In "Album de pianistes polonais"
30–32	G, A♭, c♯	1841–42	1842	Op. 50	B. 145		C. 80–82	Leon Szmitkowski	
33–35	B, C, c	1843	1844	Op. 56	B. 153		C. 83–85	Catherine Maberly	
36–38	a, A♭, f♯	1845 (June–July)	1846	Op. 59	B. 157		C. 86–88		
39–41	B, f, c♯	1846 (early autumn)	1847	Op. 63	B. 162		C. 89–91	Countess Laura Czosnowska	
42, 44	G, C	1835	1855	Op. posth. 67/1, 3	B. 93		C. 92, 94	Anna Mlokosiewicz	
45	a	1846	1855	Op. posth. 67/4	B. 163		C. 95		
43	g	1849 (summer)	1855	Op. posth. 67/2	B. 167		C. 93		
47	a	1827	1855	Op. posth. 68/2	B. 18		C. 97		
46	C	1829	1855	Op. posth. 68/1	B. 38		C. 96		
48	F	1829	1855	Op. posth. 68/3	B. 34		C. 98		Quotes the folk tune "Oj, Magdalino"
49	f	1849 (summer)	1855; 1965	Op. posth. 68/4	B. 168		C. 99		"Chopin's last composition"; first published in an incomplete form 1855. Full version with rediscovered third section published 1965
–	G	1829 (22 August)	1856, Warsaw	–	B. 39	KK IVa/9	P. 1/9		Song: "Which flowers" (Jakież kwiaty, jakie wianki). Setting of a poem by Ignac Maciejowski. While marked Mazur, usually catalogued as a song (voice part only)
–	C	1833	1870	–	B. 82	KK IVb/3	P. 2/3		
–	D	1829	1875	–	B. 31	KK IVa/7	P. 1/7		Heavily revised 1832 (see B. 71, KK IVb/2)
–	D	1832	1880	–	B. 71	KK IVb/2	P. 2/2		A heavily revised version of B. 31, KK IVa/7
–	B♭	1832 (24 June)	1909	–	B. 73	KK IVb/1	P. 2/1	Alexandrine Wołowska	
–	D	1820 (?)	1910 (20 February)	–	B. 4	KK Anh. Ia/1	A. 1/1		"Mazurek"; doubtful. Available
–	A♭	1834 (July)	1930	–	B. 85	KK IVb/4	P. 2/4		Found in the album of Maria Szymanowska
–	F♯	1829 (?)	1990	–	–	KK Anh. II/1			Long version spurious (by Charles Mayer); Abridged Allegretto is a short version reconstruction by Jan Ekier of an album leaf once found in Leopoldyna Blahetka's album - see WN 36
–	?	"early"	–	–	–	KK Vf			"Several mazurkas"; lost
–	D	1826 (?)	–	–	–	KK Ve/5			Mentioned in literature; MS unknown
–	?	1832	–	–	–	KK Vc/2			Mentioned in a letter from Chopin dated 10 September 1832
–	?	1832 (14 September)	–	–	–	KK Ve/7			Listed in an auction party, Paris, 1906
–	B♭	1835 (2 September)	–	–	–	KK Ve/4			MS sold in Paris, 20 June 1977 (initially catalogued as lost, but has since surfaced). Based on Poland's (now) national anthem "Mazurek Dąbrowskiego" ("Poland Is Not Yet Lost"). Original autograph by Chopin contains only the refrain. Reconstruction of anthem's verse done by Mariusz Dubaj
–	?	1846 (by December)	–	–	–	KK Vc/4			Mentioned in a letter from Chopin
–	A, d	?	–	–	–	KK VIIb/7-8			Allegretto and Mazurka (based on folk tunes); MS sold in Paris, 21 November 1974. Available
–	b♭	?	–	–	–	KK Anh. Ib/1 (Anh. Ia/8 in earlier sources)			Doubtful. Found in an album by Walerian Stopnicki held in Jan Tomasz Stopnicki's private collection in Warsaw, according to Krystyna Kobylańska's catalogue. Only an incipit seven measures long has been published
–	?	?	–	–	–	KK Ve/8			Mentioned in 1878 correspondence between Breitkopf & Härtel and Izabela Barcińska
–	?	?	–	–	–	KK Ve/6		Mme. Nicolai	Mentioned in a note from Augener to C.A. Spina, 21 May 1884

== Sources ==
- Downes, Stephen (2009). "Mazurka." Grove Music Online. Oxford Music Online. 17 November 2009.
- Michałowski, Kornel and Samson, Jim (2009). "Chopin, Fryderyk Franciszek." Grove Music Online. Oxford Music Online. 17 November 2009 (esp. section 6, “Formative Influences”) .
- Kallberg, Jeffrey (1988). “The problem of repetition and return in Chopin's mazurkas.” Chopin Styles, ed. Jim Samson. Cambridge, England: Cambridge University Press
- Kallberg, Jeffrey (1985). "Chopin's Last Style." Journal of the American Musicological Society 38.2: 264–315.
- Milewski, Barbara (1999). "Chopin's Mazurkas and the Myth of the Folk." 19th-Century Music 23.2: 113–35.
- Rosen, Charles (1995). The Romantic Generation. Cambridge, Massachusetts: Harvard University Press
- Winoker, Roselyn M. (1974) “Chopin and the Mazurka.” Diss. Sarah Lawrence College
