= Polonaises (Chopin) =

Musical works by Chopin

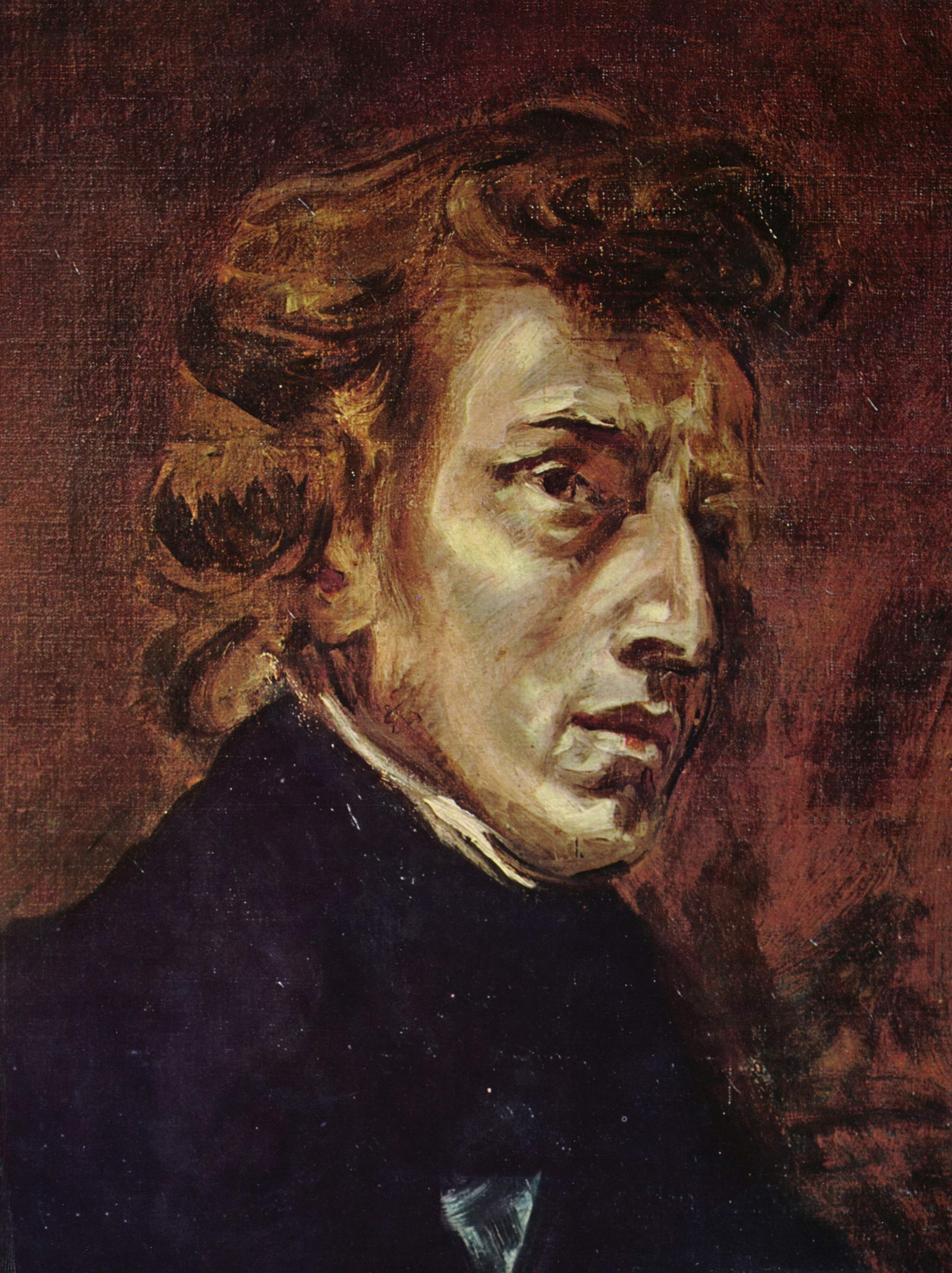
Frédéric Chopin, 28, from Delacroix's joint portrait of Chopin and Sand, 1838

Most of Frédéric Chopin's polonaises were written for solo piano. He wrote his first polonaise in 1817, when he was 7; his last was the Polonaise-Fantaisie of 1846, three years before his death. Among the best known polonaises are the "Military" Polonaise in A major, Op. 40, No. 1, the "Tragic" Polonaise In F♯ minor, Op. 44, and the "Heroic" Polonaise in A♭ major, Op. 53.

There is also the Andante spianato et grande polonaise brillante in E♭ major, Op. 22, for piano and orchestra (a solo piano version also exists), and the Introduction and Polonaise brillante in C major, Op. 3, for cello and piano.

== Polonaises for solo piano ==
Chopin wrote at least 23 polonaises for piano solo. Of these:

- 7, including the Polonaise-Fantaisie, were published in his lifetime with opus numbers
- 1 was published in his lifetime without an opus number by his father (Polonaise in G minor)
- 3 were published posthumously with an opus number (Op. 71)
- 5 were published posthumously without opus numbers
- at least 7 are lost.

== List of polonaises by Chopin ==
These are for solo piano unless otherwise indicated.

Series number	Key	Composed	Published	Opus Number	Brown	Kobylańska	Chomiński	Dedication	Notes
11	G minor	1817	1817	-	B. 1	KK IIa/1	S. 1/1	Countess Wiktoria Skarbek	Published by Chopin's father
-	C major	1829-30	1831	Op. 3	B. 41/52				Introduction and Polonaise brillante for cello and piano
-	E♭ major	1830-34	1836	Op. 22	B. 58/88				Andante spianato et grande polonaise brillante; originally for piano and orchestra. A solo piano version also exists
1	C♯ minor	1834-35	1836	Op. 26/1	B. 90/1			Josef Dessauer	
2	E♭ minor	1834-35	1836	Op. 26/2	B. 90/2			Josef Dessauer	
3	A major	1838 (October)	1841	Op. 40/1	B. 120			Julian Fontana	"Military" Polonaise
4	C minor	1838-39	1841	Op. 40/2	B. 121			Julian Fontana	
5	F♯ minor	1840-41	1841	Op. 44	B. 135			Mme la Princesse Charles de Beauveau, née de Komar	"Tragic" Polonaise
6	A♭ major	1842	1843	Op. 53	B. 147			Auguste Léo	"Heroic" or "Drum" Polonaise
7	A♭ major	1845-46	1846	Op. 61	B. 159			Mme A. Veyret	Polonaise-Fantaisie
8	D minor	1825	1855	Op. posth. 71/1	B. 11				Some sources give 1827 as the composition date
9	B♭ major	1828	1855	Op. posth. 71/2	B. 24				
10	F minor	1828	1855	Op. posth. 71/3	B. 30				
14	G♯ minor	1822	1864	-	B. 6	KK IVa/3	P. 1/3	Mme. Du-Pont	Some sources give 1824 as the composition date
16	G♭ major	1829 (July)	1870	-	B. 36	KK IVa/8	P. 1/8		
15	B♭ minor	1826-27	1879	-	B. 13	KK IVa/5	P. 1/5	"son ami Guillaume Kolberg, en partant pour Reinertz"	"Adieu" Polonaise. Includes a quotation from Rossini's La gazza ladra (the tenor cavatina "Vieni fra queste braccia")
13	A♭ major	1821	1902	-	B. 5	KK IVa/2	P. 1/2	Wojciech Żywny	Some sources doubt this is a work by Chopin
12	B♭ major	1817	1910	-	B. 3	KK IVa/1	P. 1/1		
-	?	"early"	-	-	-	KK Vf	-		"Several polonaises", now lost
-	?	1818	-	-	-	-	-		2 polonaises presented on 26 September 1818 to the Empress Maria Fyodorovna, mother of Tsar Alexander I of Russia, on the occasion of her visit to Warsaw; these are now lost
-	?	1825	-	-	-	KK Vf	-		Lost; on themes by Rossini (The Barber of Seville) and Spontini; mentioned in a letter from Chopin dated November 1825
-	?	1831 (by July)	-	-	-	KK Vc/1			Lost; mentioned in a letter from Chopin
-	?	1832	-	-	-	KK Vc/3			Lost; mentioned in a letter from Chopin dated 10 September 1832

== See also ==
- List of compositions by Frédéric Chopin by genre
- List of compositions by Frédéric Chopin by opus number
