= Rondo in C minor (Chopin) =

First published work of Frédéric Chopin

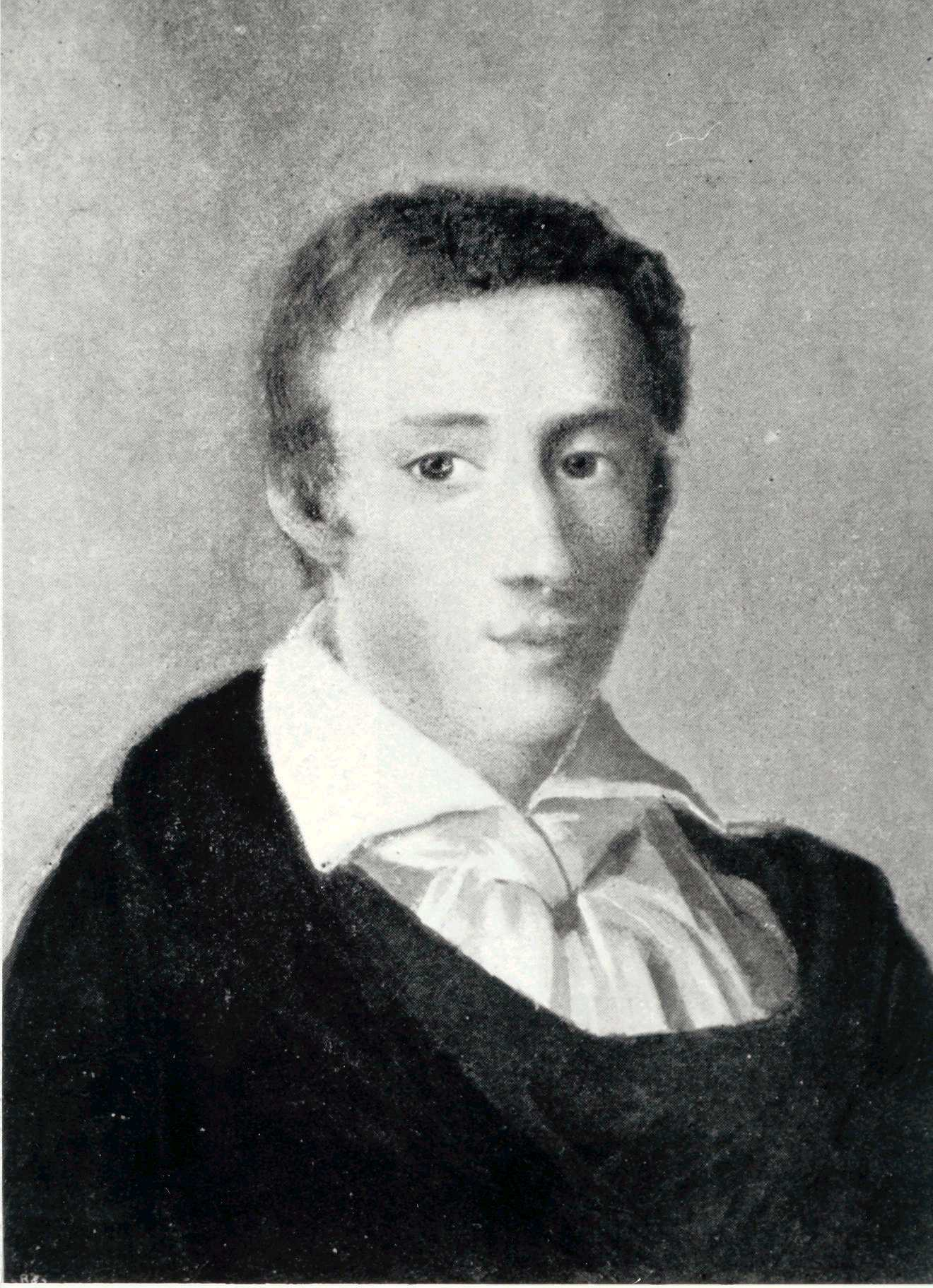
Frédéric Chopin by Mieroszewski, 1829

The Rondo in C minor, Op. 1, for solo piano is Frédéric Chopin's first published work, published in 1825, and dedicated to "Madame de Linde", the wife of the headmaster of the Lyceum at which Chopin was studying. The piece contains an "unorthodox (but entirely logical) tonal scheme". The first phase begins in C minor, moving into E major, A♭ major, then back to C minor. The second phase moves to D♭ major, finishing in C minor for a final statement of the theme.

Chopin premiered the work at a concert on 10 June 1825 in the auditorium of the Warsaw Conservatory. The performance gained a review in the Allgemeine musikalische Zeitung of Leipzig (probably written by Chopin's teacher Józef Elsner) praising its "wealth of musical ideas".

Robert Schumann wrote to his teacher Friedrich Wieck of the Rondo in 1832:

Chopin's first work (I believe firmly that it is his 10th) is in my hands: a lady would say that it was very pretty, very piquant, almost Moschelesque. But I believe you will make Clara study it; for there is plenty of spirit in it and few difficulties. But I humbly venture to assert that there are between this composition and Op. 2 two years and twenty works.
