= Polonaises, Op. posth. (Chopin) =

Polonaises by Frédéric Chopin

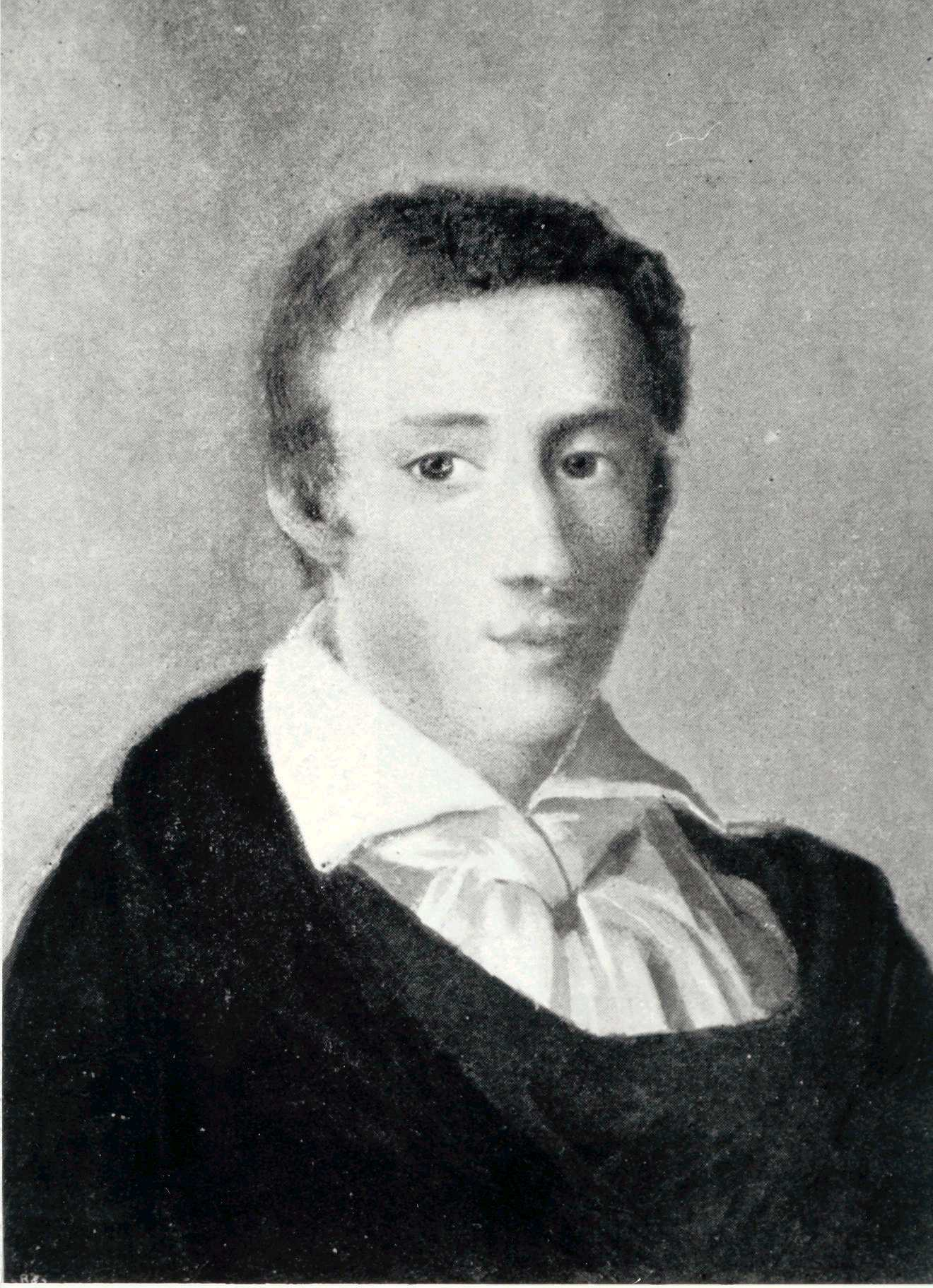
Frédéric Chopin by Mieroszewski, 1829

The Polonaises Op. posth[umous] include Frédéric Chopin's polonaises that were not given opus numbers.

This page does not consider the three posthumous polonaises Op. 71, which Chopin's assistant Julian Fontana published with the family approval. On the other hand, it includes the early G minor polonaise (KK IIa No. 1) that was published in Chopin's youth without opus number.

== Pieces ==
=== KK IIa No. 1: Polonaise in G minor (1817) ===
Polonaise in G minor (B. 1) was either the first or second of Chopin's Polonaises, the other one being Polonaise in B♭ major. The piece was written in 1817, when he was only seven. It was dedicated to Lady Wiktoria Skarbek, the wife of his godfather.

The piece consists of two main parts; a minor dance section which lasts 12 measures, and a major section consisting of a variation of the first dance along with a trio. This goes on for 26 measures, by which it then repeats to the minor dance section.

=== KK IVa No. 1: Polonaise in B♭ major (1817) ===
Polonaise in B♭ major (B. 3) was also written when Chopin was seven. Though Chopin asked to have it (and other unpublished works) burned after death, it was published in 1879.

=== KK IVa No. 2: Polonaise in A♭ major (1821) ===
Chopin dedicated this polonaise (B. 5) to his teacher, Wojciech Żywny (1756–1842). It was not first published until 1901.

=== KK IVa No. 3: Polonaise in G♯ minor (1824) ===
This polonaise (B. 6) was not published until a year after his death in 1850.

=== KK IVa No. 5: Polonaise in B♭ minor "Adieu à Guillaume Kolberg" (1826) ===
This polonaise (B. 13) quotes the tenor cavatina "Vieni fra queste braccia" from Rossini's opera La gazza ladra, which Chopin had seen with his father's friend, the composer Oskar Kolberg.

=== KK IVa No. 8: Polonaise in G♭ major (1829) ===
This polonaise (B. 36) was the final one published posthumously.

== Numbering systems ==
On some CDs, these pieces are respectively designated as "Nos. 11, 12, 13, 14, 15 & 16" in the order presented above. Others give a different numbering system, comparatively "Nos. 15, 16, 11, 12, 13 & 14" or "Nos. 15, 16, 13, 14, 11 & 12".
