= Nocturne in C-sharp minor =

Nocturne in C-sharp minor may refer to:

- Nocturne in C-sharp minor, Op. 27, No. 1, by Frédéric Chopin
- Nocturne in C-sharp minor, Op. posth. (Chopin) by Frédéric Chopin
- Nocturne in C-sharp minor (attributed to Chopin)
