= Prelude No. 26 (Chopin) =

1834 musical composition by Frédéric Chopin

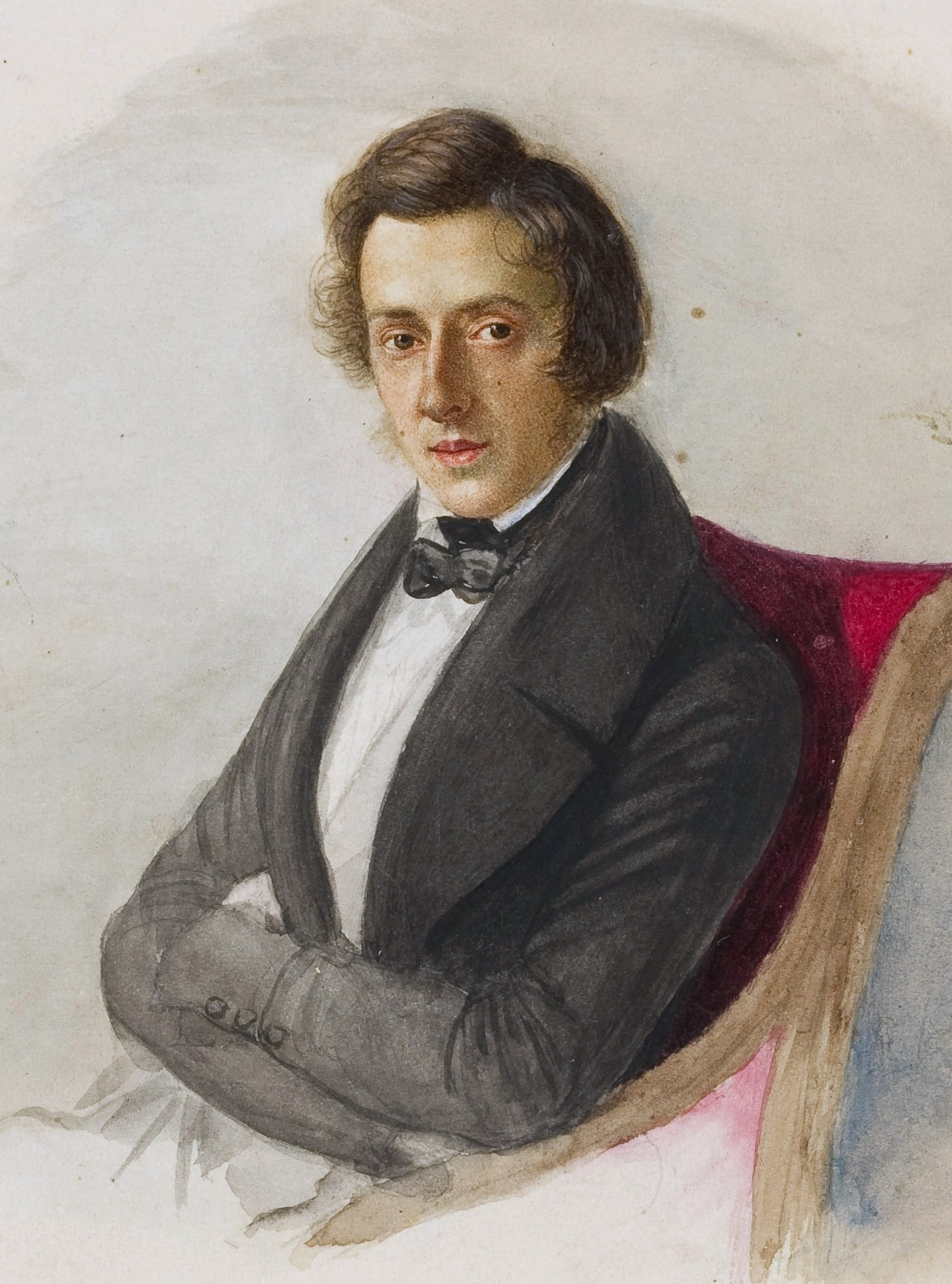
Frédéric Chopin at 25, by his fiancée Maria Wodzińska, 1835

The Prelude in A♭ major, B. 86, WN 44, was composed by Frédéric Chopin as a gift to a friend, Swiss pianist Pierre Etienne Wolff, professor of piano at the Geneva Conservatory. The composition, which predates the first of the Preludes, Op. 28, ended up in the possession of the family of one of Wolff's students and was not publicly performed until 1919, following the composition's first publication in a Swiss arts magazine in 1918.

== History ==
What is known about the circumstances under which the piece was composed comes from the manuscript copy given to Pierre Wolff which is currently held by the US Library of Congress. This manuscript indicates that the piece is dedicated to Wolff, and that it was completed in July 1834. (Note: The date is ambiguous and has been interpreted as either the 10th or 18th of the month.) Wolff eventually gave the manuscript to a student, Aline Forget whose family retained the manuscript until 1962, when it was sold to the Spokane Conservatory. Mieczysław Tomaszewski in his description of the piece for the Frederick Chopin Institute speculates, without providing a source that the composition may have been intended for the Op. 28 Preludes and was rejected by the composer in favour of the prelude that became Op. 28, No. 17.

First publication took place in 1918 in the magazine 'Pages d'Art'. The first public performance, by pianist E. R. Blanchet took place on April 9, 1919 with publication by Henn of Geneva following shortly after.

While the manuscript is untitled, the work as initially published as the 'Prélude inédit' (Eng: Unknown Prelude) and the piece is generally regarded as the 26th Prelude on modern recordings.

== Structure ==
The composition is structured as a single movement marked Presto con leggierezza and takes around 40 to 50 seconds to perform.

Robert Cummings, writing for Allmusic.com describes the piece as being "buoyant and sunlit", terminology similar to Tomaszewski's description of the work as being "lively and airy". Robin Rausch, in her article on the manuscript held at the Library of Congress, describes the composition as being essentially an Album leaf, a piece written to be given to a friend with no intention of the work being published.
