= Mazurkas, Op. posth. (Chopin) =

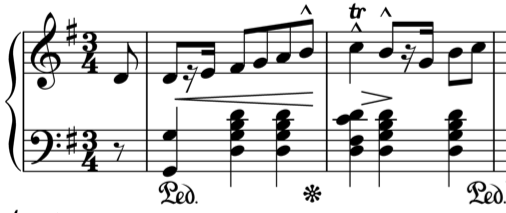
Mazurka B.16/1 (published by Breitkopf & Härtel in 1880)

Mazurka in G major, B. 16 No. 1

Mazurka in B♭ major, B. 16 No. 2

Mazurka in D major, B. 31

Mazurka in D major, B. 71

Mazurka in B♭ major, B. 73

Mazurka in C major, B. 82

Mazurka in A♭ major, B. 85

Mazurka in A minor, B. 134

Mazurka in A minor, B. 140

There are at least nine mazurkas by Chopin without opus number, usually designated as Op. posth., though at least four of these were published in his lifetime.

- 2 mazurkas in G major and B♭ major, B. 16, were composed and published in 1826 as revised versions; the originals were published in 1875.
- D major, B. 31 (1829; pub. 1875); first version
- D major, B. 71 (1832; pub. 1880); revised version
- B♭ major, B. 73 (1832; pub. 1909) – dedicated to Alexandrine Wołowska
- C major, B. 82 (1833; pub. 1870)
- A♭ major, B. 85 (1834; pub. 1930) – found in the album of Maria Szymanowska
- A minor (Notre Temps), B. 134 (1840; pub. 1841) – in the collection "Six morceaux de salon", issued by the magazine Notre Temps along with works by Thalberg, Czerny and others.
- A minor (À Émile Gaillard), B. 140 (1840; pub. 1841) – in "Album de pianistes polonais". Dedicated to Émile Gaillard.

== Doubtful authenticity ==
- "Mazurek" in D major, B. 4, KK Anh. Ia/1 (1820?; pub. 1910)
- Allegretto (Mazurka) in F♯ major, KK Anh. II/1 (1829?; long version by Charles Mayer; abridged Allegretto is a reconstructed album leaf by Jan Ekier – WN 36, pub. 1990)
- Mazurka in B♭ minor, KK Anh. Ib/1 (private collection, only first seven measures published)
