= Rondo à la Krakowiak =

Concert rondo for piano and orchestra by Frédéric Chopin

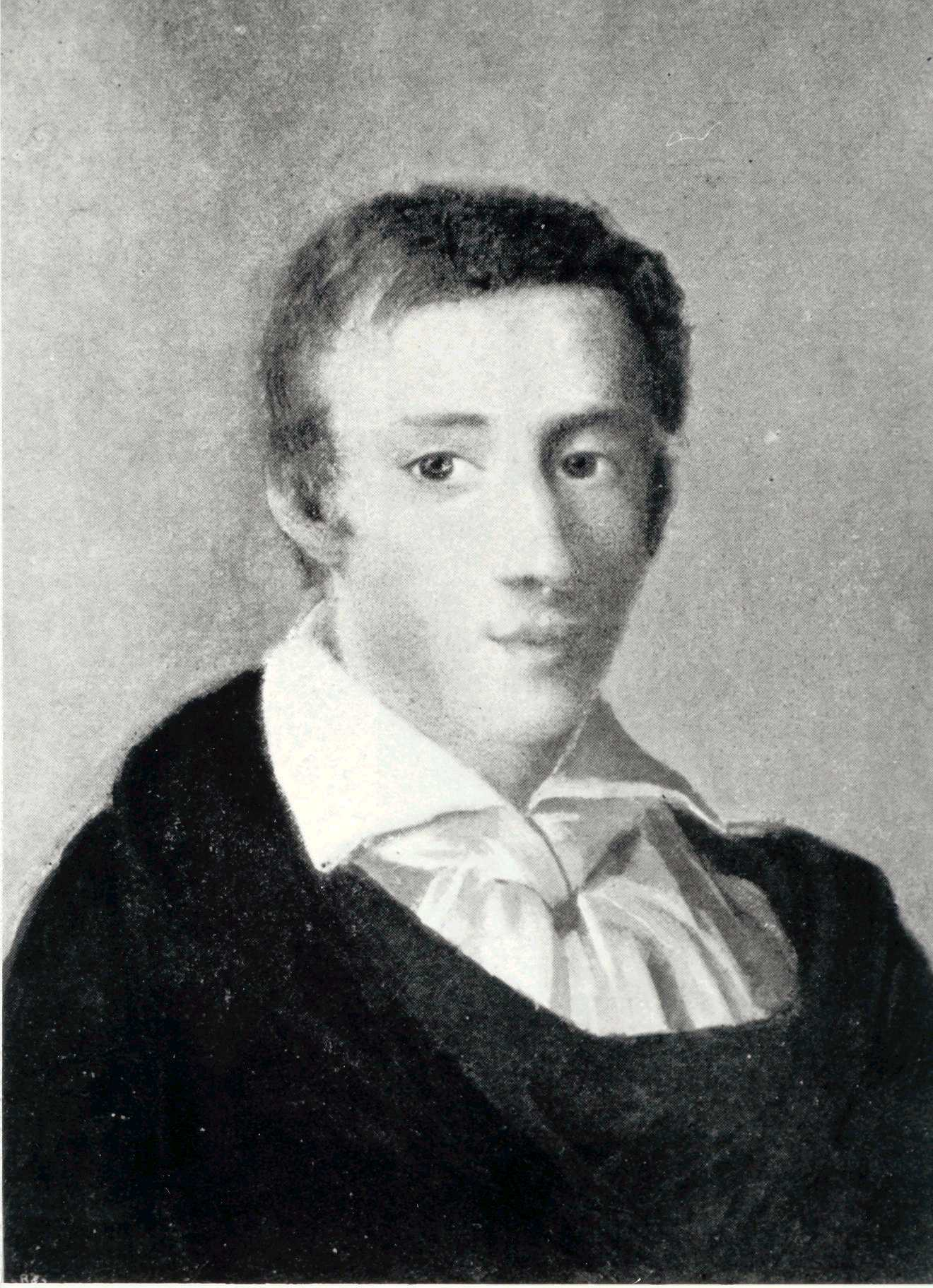
Frédéric Chopin, by Mieroszewski, 1829

Frédéric Chopin's Rondo à la Krakowiak in F major, Op. 14 is a composition for piano and orchestra. It was written in Warsaw in 1828 under the guidance of Józef Elsner and dedicated to Princess Anna Zofia Sapieha, whose mother, Izabela Czartoryska, was influential in shaping the burgeoning Romantic aesthetic in Poland, particularly through the Temple of Polish Memory in Puławy.

This rondo has received a number of recordings, but still remains less known than most of Chopin's other works.

== Structure ==
The piece begins with a soft, pentatonic section in 3/4 time, which introduces the lively syncopated krakowiak in its typical 2/4 meter.

Chopin quotes Niccolò Paganini's Caprice No. 24 during this work, and includes a variation on the quotation.
