= Frederic Chiu =

American pianist (born 1964)

Frederic Chiu (born 20 October 1964) is an American classical concert pianist.

== Career ==
In 1993, he entered the Van Cliburn International Piano Competition, where his exclusion from the final round created enormous media coverage.

Chiu is also co-director of Beechwood Arts, a non-profit corporation that seeks to change the way the arts are created and experienced, through a program of intimate, innovative and immersive events. These include Arts Immersion Salons that include Music, Art, Performance, Film and Culinary Arts in one event around a common theme, and Culinary+Art which combines high-end restaurant experiences with gallery-quality exhibits.

Chiu is a Yamaha Artist. In 2014, he marked his 25th anniversary as a Yamaha Artist with special commemorative events, including concerts at the Newport Music Festival and in New York City at Miller Theatre. He has been a notable supporter of Yamaha's new products, including the CFX line of grand pianos, the Disklavier Mark IV, DisklavierTV, the PSR-OR700 Keyboard, the GranTouch, the AvantGrand and Yamaha Entertainment Group's recording label. He was the first Classical artist to record for YEG, in 2015, with the release of Distant Voices, available on three platforms: Audio CD, Video DVD and DisklavierTV.
