= Polish songs (Chopin) =

Songs for voice and piano

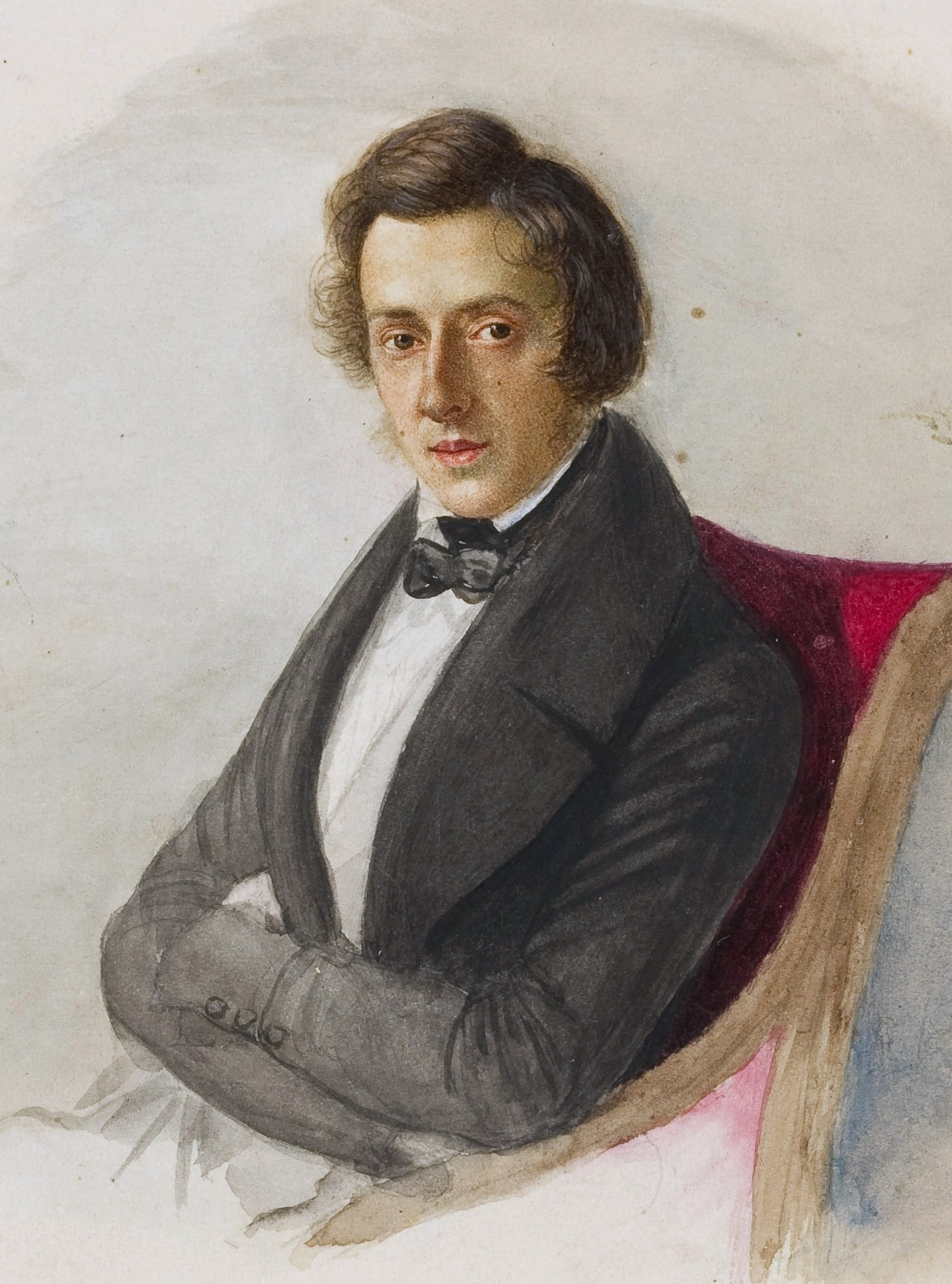
Chopin at 25, by Maria Wodzińska, 1835

Although Frédéric Chopin is best known for his works for piano solo, among his extant output are 19 songs for voice and piano, set to Polish texts.

== Background ==
Chopin wrote these songs at various times, from perhaps as early as 1827 when he was 17, to 1847, two years before his death. Only two of them were published in his lifetime (Życzenie and Wojak were published in Kyiv in 1837 and 1839 respectively).

In 1857, 17 songs were collected for publication by Julian Fontana as Op. 74, but they were not arranged in chronological order of composition within that opus. Due to censorship restrictions, he was only able to publish 16 of them initially. These appeared in Warsaw as Zbiór śpiewów polskich Fryderyka Chopina (A Collection of Polish Songs by Frédéric Chopin), published by Gebethner & Wolff; and in Berlin as 16 Polnische Lieder, published by A M Schlesinger. The 17th song, Śpiew z mogiłki (Hymn from the Tomb) was published separately in Berlin with a French title, Chant du tombeau.

A further two songs were published in 1910. Another brief song (Mazur) was published separately, but includes only the surviving voice part. Some references append these to the original Op. 74 listing, now comprising all 20 known songs.

In addition to these, Chopin wrote a number of other songs that are now lost (5) or fragmentary (4). Some extant songs have been attributed to Chopin but are now considered spurious or doubtful (6).

== Texts ==
All but one of the texts of the Chopin songs were original poems by his Polish contemporaries, with most of whom he was personally acquainted. The sole exception is Piosnka litewska (A Lithuanian Song), which was set to a Polish translation by Ludwik Osiński.

Ten of them are by a friend of Chopin's family, Stefan Witwicki, from his Piosnki Sielskie (Idylls, 1830). (Chopin also dedicated his Mazurkas, Op. 41, to Witwicki.) Three were by Józef Bohdan Zaleski. Two were by a friend of Chopin's named Adam Mickiewicz. Wincenty Pol's revolutionary Songs of Janusz (1836) inspired Chopin to write up to a dozen songs, but only one survives. Zygmunt Krasiński, the lover of Delfina Potocka, was another poet who inspired Chopin to write a song.

The songs have been translated into over a dozen languages. Various English titles have been applied to some of the songs.

== Recordings ==
Those who have recorded the 17 songs of Op. 74, or all 20 known songs, include:

- Elisabeth Söderström with Vladimir Ashkenazy
- Leyla Gencer with Nikita Magaloff
- Stefania Toczyska with Janusz Olejniczak
- Teresa Żylis-Gara with Halina Czerny-Stefańska
- Eugenia Zareska with Giorgio Favaretto
- Stefania Woytowicz and Andrzej Bachleda with Wanda Klimowicz
- Françoise Ogéas with Eva Osinska
- Maria Kurenko with Robert Hufstader
- Urszula Kryger with Charles Spencer.
- H Januszewska with M Drewnowski
- Joanna Kozłowska with Waldemar Malicki, CDAccord ACD051 (1999)
- Elżbieta Szmytka with Malcolm Martineau (1999)
- Ewa Podleś with Garrick Ohlsson
- Aleksandra Kurzak, soprano, and Mariusz Kwiecień, baritone, accompanied by Nelson Goerner (all 19 songs, recorded in Warsaw in 2009 and issued by the Fryderyk Chopin Institute)
- Olga Pasichnyk with Natalya Pasichnyk (2009)
- Mario Hacquard, baritone and Anna Zassimova, piano (French version by Victor Wilder - Recorded in Karlsruhe with a piano by Sebastien Erard - 2017)
- Chopin Lieder Op. 74, produced by Elegia Classics 2018 with Dominika Zamara (soprano) and Franco Moro (piano)

Other singers have recorded selected songs.

== Arrangements ==
Chopin himself arranged his song Wiosna as a piece for piano alone (Andantino in G minor, B. 117). There exist five manuscript versions of this arrangement, dated between April 1838 and 1 September 1848.

Between 1847 and 1860, Chopin's friend Franz Liszt arranged six of the Op. 74 songs as piano transcriptions under the title Six Chants polonais, S.480, a set which has long been a concert and recording favourite. The six are:

1. Mädchens Wunsch (No. 1: Życzenie – The Wish)
2. Frühling (No. 2: Wiosna – Spring)
3. Das Ringlein (No. 14: Pierścień – The Ring), which leads without a break into...
4. Bacchanal (No. 4: Hulanka – Merrymaking)
5. Meine Freuden (No. 12: Moja pieszczotka – My Darling)
6. Heimkehr (No. 15: Narzeczony – The Bridegroom).

In this arrangement, Das Ringlein leads without a break into Bacchanal, and towards the end of the latter song, immediately before the coda, Liszt includes a short 6-bar reprise of the earlier song.

== List of Polish songs by Chopin ==
No.	Polish title	English translation	Alternative title(s)	Text by	Date composed	Published	Opus no.	Other catalogue nos.	Key(s)	Notes
1.	Życzenie	A Maiden's wish	A Young Girl's Wish	Stefan Witwicki	1829 (circa)	1837, Kyiv; later 1857, Berlin	74/1	WN 21, B. 33	G major	Franz Liszt used this melody as No. 2 (Mélodie polonaise) of his Glanes de Woronince, S.249 (1847); Liszt also transcribed the song for piano solo as No. 1 of his Six Chants polonais, S.480 (composed 1847–1860); Chopin also used a motif from the song in his posthumous Nocturne in C♯ minor, Lento con gran espressione
2.	Wiosna	Spring	-	Witwicki	1838	1857, Berlin	74/2	WN 52, B. 116	G minor	Chopin rewrote the piano part as Andantino, B. 117; there exist 5 manuscripts of this arrangement, dated between April 1838 and 1 September 1848; Franz Liszt also transcribed the song for piano solo as No. 2 of his Six Chants polonais, S.480 (composed 1847–1860)
3.	Smutna rzeka	Troubled Waters	The Mournful Stream, Sad River	Witwicki	1831	1857, Berlin	74/3	WN 39, B. 63/1	F♯ minor	
4.	Hulanka	Drinking Song	-	Witwicki	1830 (August)	1857, Berlin	74/4	WN 32, B. 50	C major	Franz Liszt transcribed the song for piano solo as No. 4 of his Six Chants polonais, S.480 (composed 1847–1860)
5.	Gdzie lubi	A Fickle Maid	A Maiden's Love, A Girl's Desire	Witwicki	1829 (circa)	1857, Berlin	74/5	WN 22, B. 32	A major	
6.	Precz z moich oczu	Remembrance	A Leave-taking, Out of My Sight	Adam Mickiewicz	1830	1857, Berlin	74/6	WN 33, B. 48	F minor	
7.	Poseł	The Messenger	The Message	Witwicki	1830	1857, Berlin	74/7	WN 30, B. 50	D major	
8.	Śliczny chłopiec	Handsome Lad	Charming Lad; My Beloved	Józef Bohdan Zaleski	1841	1857, Berlin	74/8	WN 54, B. 143	D major	
9.	Melodia	Melody	Elegy; Lamento; Onward	Zygmunt Krasiński	1847	1857, Berlin	74/9	WN 61, B. 165	E minor	
10.	Wojak	The Warrior	Before the Battle	Witwicki	1830	1839, Kyiv; later 1857, Berlin	74/10	WN 34, B. 47	A♭ major	
11.	Dwojaki koniec	The Double-End	The Twofold End; The Two Corpses; Death's Divisions; United in Death	Zaleski	1845	1857, Berlin	74/11	WN 58, B. 156/1	D minor	
12.	Moja pieszczotka	My Darling	My Joys; My Delight	Mickiewicz	1837	1857, Berlin	74/12	WN 51, B. 112	G♭ major	Franz Liszt transcribed the song for piano solo as No. 5 of his Six Chants polonais, S.480 (composed 1847–1860)
13.	Nie ma czego trzeba	I Want What I Have Not	Faded and Vanished; Melancholy; Lack of Light	Zaleski	1845	1857, Berlin	74/13	WN 57, B. 156/2	A minor	A simpler version was published in 1910 as Dumka
14.	Pierścień	The Ring	-	Witwicki	1836 (8 September)	1857, Berlin	74/14	WN 50, B. 103	E♭ major	Chopin wrote this song into the album of Maria Wodzińska, to whom he had just become betrothed; Franz Liszt also transcribed the song for piano solo as No. 3 of his Six Chants polonais, S.480 (composed 1847–1860)
15.	Narzeczony	The Bridegroom's return	The Return Home, The Betrothed	Witwicki	1831	1857, Berlin	74/15	WN 40, B. 63/2	C minor	Franz Liszt transcribed the song for piano solo as No. 6 of his Six Chants polonais, S.480 (composed 1847–1860)
16.	Piosnka litewska	Lithuanian Song	-	trans. Ludwik Osiński	1830 (1831?)	1857, Berlin	74/16	WN 38, B. 63/3	F major	Translated from a Lithuanian folk song
17.	Śpiew z mogiły	Poland's Dirge	Leaves are Falling (Hymn from the Tomb)	Wincenty Pol	1836 (8 May)	1857, Berlin	74/17	WN 49, B. 101	E♭ minor	
-	Czary	Witchcraft	-	Witwicki	1830 (?)	1910, Leipzig	(74/18)?	WN 31, B. 51, KK. IVa/11	D minor	Sometimes included in Op. 74; the 1910 publication was of a facsimile reproduction of an album Chopin had sent to Maria Wodzińska. It was not finally published in normal form until 1954.
-	Dumka	Reverie	Dirge; Mist Before My Eyes	Zaleski	1840 (25 March)	1910 (22 October), Lviv	(74/19)?	B. 132, KK. IVb/9	A minor	Sometimes included in Op. 74; this is an earlier, simpler version of Nie ma czego trzeba.
-	Jakież kwiaty	Which Flowers	-	I. Maciejowski	1829 (22 August)	1856, Warsaw	(74/20)?	WN 17a, B. 39, KK. IVa/9	G major	Mazur, ded. Vaclav Hanka. Seldom included in Op. 74. Only voice part exists
-	Płótno	Linen	-	?	?	-	-	KK. Vd/5	?	Lost; mentioned in a letter from Julian Fontana to Chopin's sister Ludwika, dated 2 July 1852
-	?,?,?	?,?,?		?,?,?	?	-	-	KK. Vd/6-8	?,?,?	3 songs; lost. Listed in a letter from Chopin's Scottish pupil Jane Stirling to Ludwika, dated July 1852
-	?,?,?,Czulc serca	?,?,?,Tender Hearts		T. Kwiatkowski	1840–47 (?)	-	-	B. 140b	A minor, F major, F minor, G major	4 songs; only fragments for voice parts remain
-	?	?		?	?	-	-	KK. Vc/10	?	Lost; mentioned in a letter from Ludwika to her brother Chopin, dated 9 January 1841
-	Dumka na Wygnaniu	Song of the Exile	-	M. Gosławski	?	-	-	KK. Anh. Ic/1	?	Doubtful authenticity
-	Tam na błoniu	There on the Green	-	?	?	-	-	KK. Anh. Ic/2	?	Doubtful authenticity
-	Trzeci maj	The Third of May	-	S. Starzeński	?	-	-	KK. Anh. Ic/3	?	Doubtful authenticity
-	O wiem, że Polska	Oh, I know that Poland	-	Krasiński	?	-	-	KK. Anh. Ic/4	?	Doubtful authenticity
-	Pytasz się, czemu	You Ask Why	-	Krasiński	?	-	-	KK. Anh. Ic/5	?	Doubtful authenticity
-	Pieśni pielgrzyma polskiego	Songs of a Polish Pilgrim	-	K. Gaszyński	?	-	-	KK. Anh. Ic/6	?	Doubtful authenticity
