= Polonaises, Op. 71 (Chopin) =

Piano compositions by Frédéric Chopin

The three Polonaises, Op. 71 were composed by Frédéric Chopin in his earlier years, in Poland.

After the death of the composer, Julian Fontana arranged their summaries and publications. These works were published in 1855, and are now often designated as Nos. 8, 9 & 10 in the order below, continuing the numbering system following the seven polonaises published during the composer's lifetime.

Polonaise in D minor

Polonaise in B♭ major

The three polonaises are

1. Allegro maestoso in D minor, WN 11 (1825–27)
2. Allegro moderato in B♭ major, WN 17 (1829)
3. Allegro moderato in F minor, WN 12 (1826–28)

Like most of Chopin's polonaises, they are in ternary form.
