= Piano Sonata No. 1 (Chopin) =

Chopin's first piano sonata, written in 1828

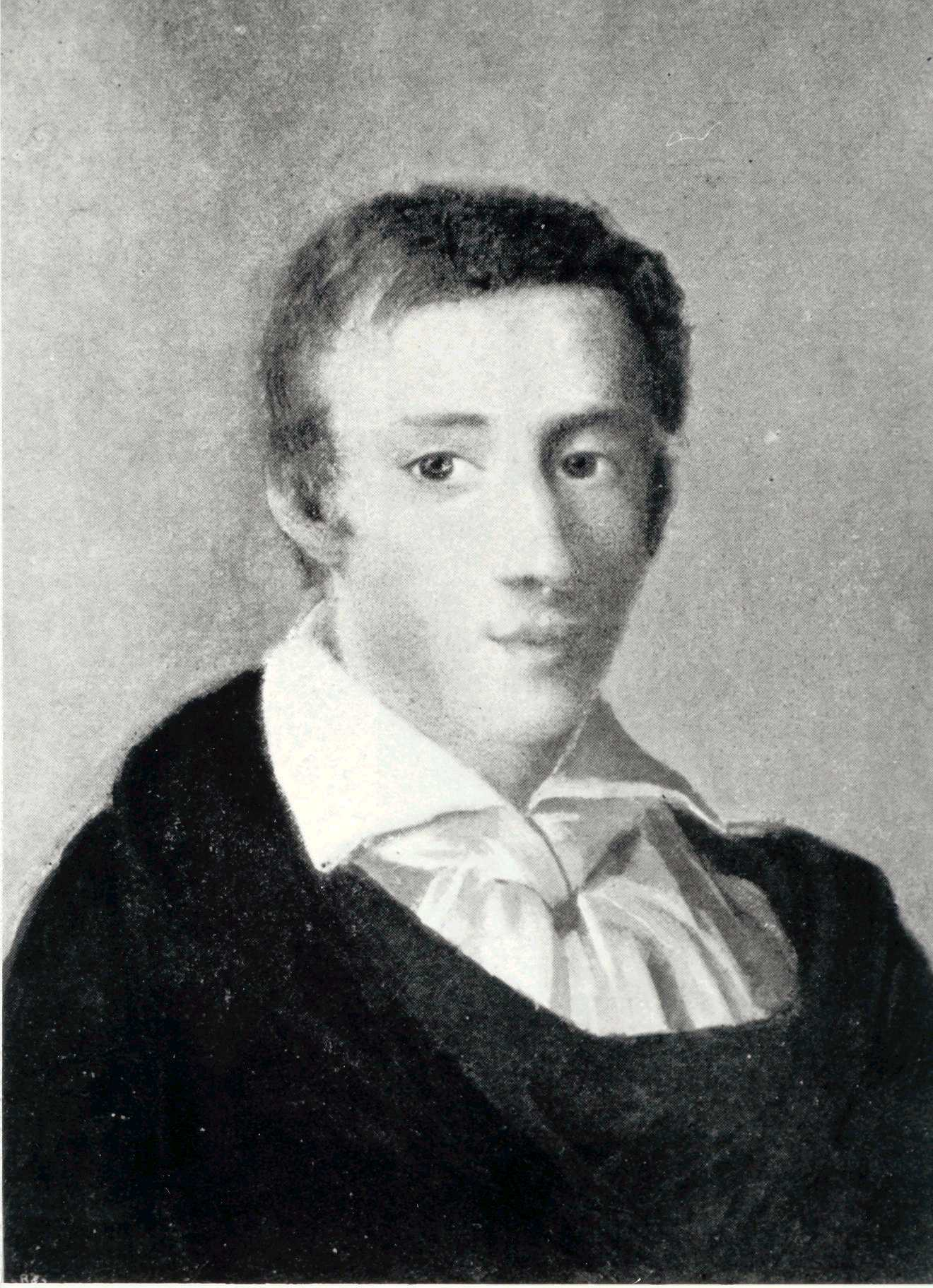
Chopin, 1829

The Piano Sonata No. 1 in C minor, Op. 4 was written by Frédéric Chopin in 1828. The piano sonata was written during Chopin's time as a student with Józef Elsner, to whom the sonata is dedicated. Despite being one of his earliest works, the sonata was not published until 1851 by Tobias Haslinger in Vienna, two years after Chopin's death. This sonata is considered to be less refined than the later 2 sonatas, and is thus much less frequently performed and recorded.

== Structure ==
The sonata has four movements:

1. Allegro maestoso (C minor)
2. Menuetto (E♭ major)
3. Larghetto (A♭ major)
4. Finale: Presto (C minor)

The first movement is in sonata form. Only in the aspect of key relations does this movement break from tradition; the second group of themes is based in C minor as much as is the first, so that the dramatic contrast of key which Cedric Thorpe-Davie among others identify as the heart of sonata form is lost. Furthermore, the recapitulation begins in the remote key of B♭ minor, with the second theme appearing in G minor.

The second movement is the only minuet that Chopin is known to have written. The central trio is in E♭ minor, the tonic's parallel minor.

The third movement is in 5/4 time, which is very unusual for pieces of that era. The third beat of each five-beat bar carries a secondary accent, which is marked explicitly in certain bars. In other places, it can be inferred, and in still other places Chopin seems to defy this convention and not expect this. James Huneker, in his introduction to the 1895 American publication of the Mikuli edition of the work, calls this unusual characteristic a "failed novelty."

The last movement is a virtuosic finale in C minor and sonata-rondo form. The most difficult and most effective movement of the sonata, it, among the finales of Chopin's piano sonatas, takes the longest to perform.
