= Rondo in C major (Chopin) =

Composition for two pianos by Frédéric Chopin

The Rondo in C major for two pianos, Op. posth. 73, by Frédéric Chopin, was composed in 1828, when the composer was 18 years old and a student at the Warsaw Conservatory. A typical performance lasts 8–9 minutes.

The work was originally conceived for solo piano, although Chopin soon after arranged it for two pianos. The work was not published until after his death, when the two-piano version reached print in Berlin in 1855.

== Notable recordings ==
For solo piano

- Vladimir Ashkenazy
- Garrick Ohlsson
- Frederic Chiu

For two pianos

- Daniil Trifonov and Sergei Babayan
- Frederic Chiu
