= Mazurkas, Op. 67 (Chopin) =

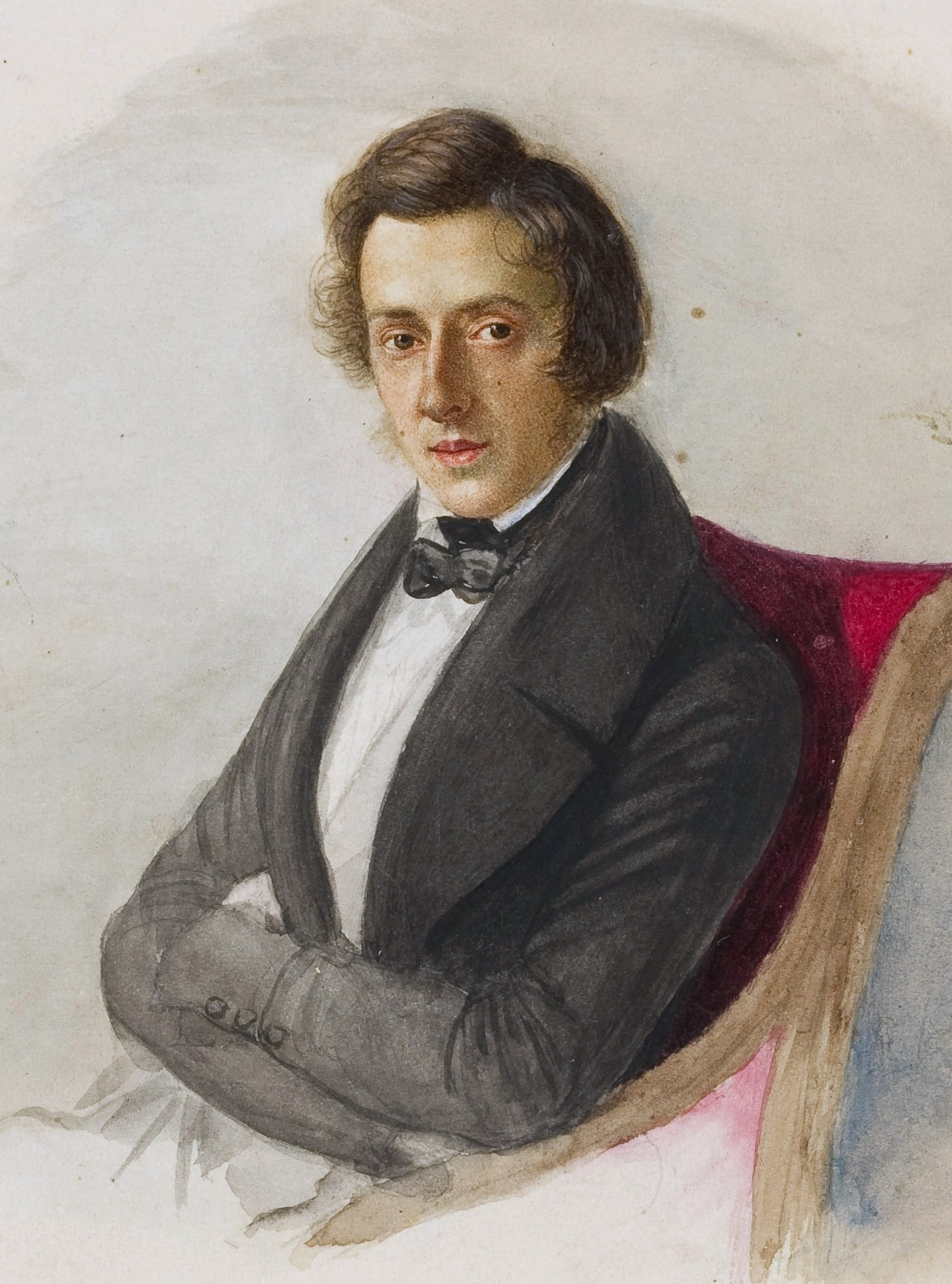
Chopin at 25, by his fiancée Maria Wodzińska, 1835

The Op. 67 mazurkas by Frédéric Chopin are a set of four mazurkas composed between 1835 and 1849 and published posthumously in 1855. A typical performance of all four lasts around seven minutes. They comprise:

- Mazurka in G major, Op. 67, No. 1 (1835)
- Mazurka in G minor, Op. 67, No. 2 (1849, often regarded as one of his last compositions, along with the Mazurka in F minor, Op. 68, No. 4, and composed in the last year of his life)
- Mazurka in C major, Op. 67, No. 3 (1835)
- Mazurka in A minor, Op. 67, No. 4 (1846, one of his more popular mazurkas)
