= Variations on "Là ci darem la mano" =

Set of variations for piano and orchestra by Frédéric Chopin

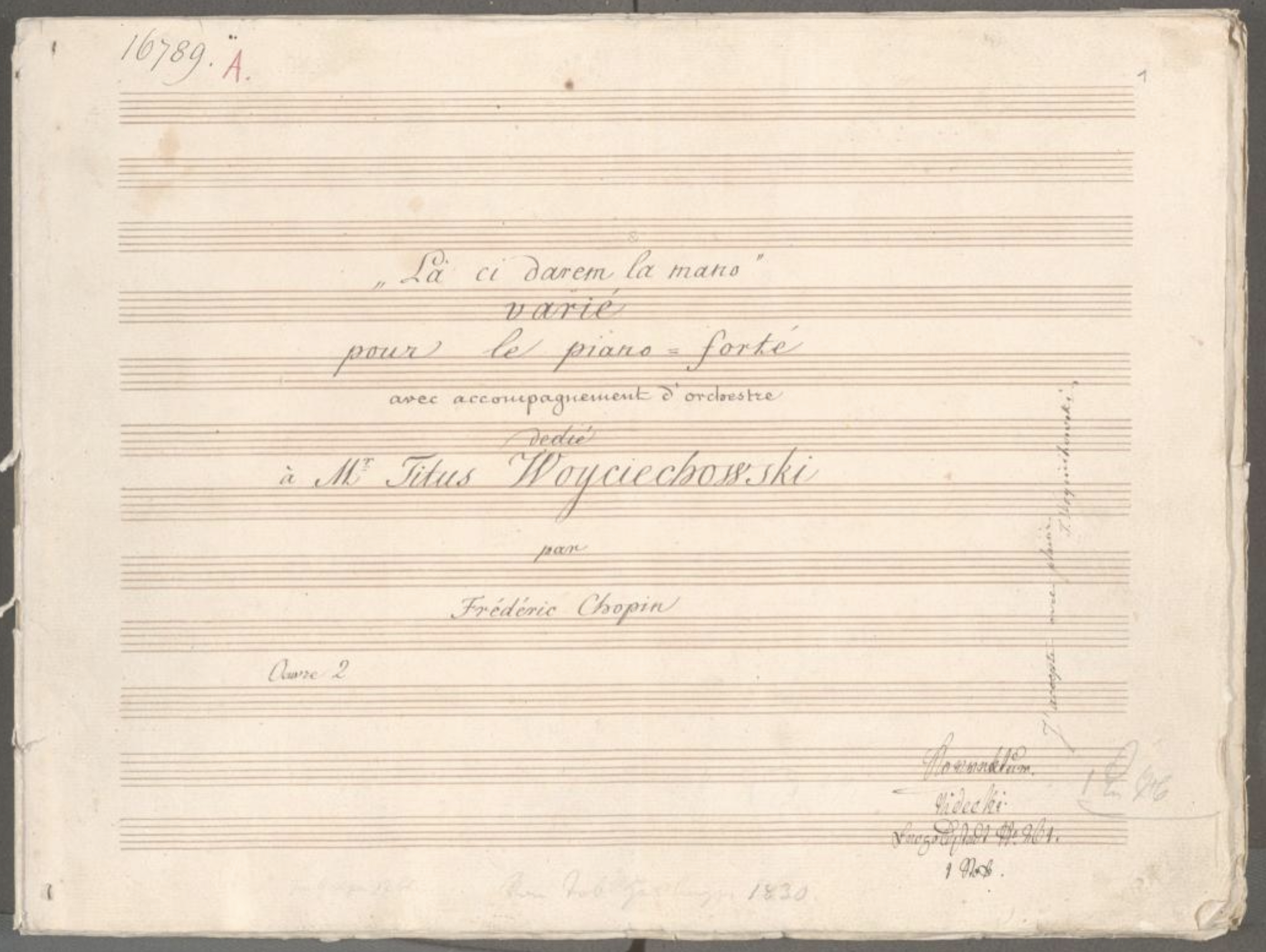
Autograph of Chopin‘s Variations Op. 2. Title page with dedication to Tytus Woyciechowski. Woyciechowski‘s handwritten reply upright on the right side.

Frédéric Chopin's Variations on "Là ci darem la mano" for piano and orchestra, Op. 2, was written in 1827, when he was aged 17. "Là ci darem la mano" is a duet sung by Don Giovanni and Zerlina in act 1 of Mozart's 1787 opera Don Giovanni. In a manuscript of this composition, dedicated to his schoolfriend Tytus Woyciechowski, the latter replied on the title page in written form „J’accepte avec plaisir“ („I accept with pleasure“). Chopin's work inspired Robert Schumann's famous exclamation: "Hats off, gentlemen, a genius."

The work is often recorded and played in concert. A typical performance lasts from 17 to 19 minutes. One autograph of the version for solo piano is held by the Austrian National Library.

== Structure ==
Opening of the Variations

The work is in the key of B♭ major throughout, except for the Adagio of Variation 5, which is in the parallel minor key.

- Introduction: Largo—Poco piu mosso, common time
- Thema: Allegretto, 2/4
- Variation 1: Brillante, 2/4
- Variation 2: Veloce, ma accuratamente, 2/4
- Variation 3: Sempre sostenuto, 2/4
- Variation 4: Con bravura, 2/4
- Variation 5:
  - Adagio, B♭ minor, common time
  - Coda: Alla Polacca, 3/4.

== Chopin and the orchestra ==
Variations on "Là ci darem la mano" was Chopin's first work for piano with orchestra. In his early career he wrote two piano concertos and three other concertante pieces, but always remained relatively indifferent to the orchestral elements of these works, often using the orchestra as a mere accompaniment to the much more brilliant piano part.

Chopin often played the variations without accompaniment, and he later abandoned the orchestra almost entirely in his compositions, though he was working on a third concerto in 1834, and in 1841 he published the Allegro de concert, speculated to be the piano part of the first movement of the unfinished concerto.

== Reception ==
The work was premiered on 11 August 1829 at the Vienna Kärntnertortheater, with Chopin as the soloist. It received very positive audience and critical acclaim. Writing to his parents in Warsaw about his success, he said that "everyone clapped so loudly after each variation that I had difficulty hearing the orchestral tutti." Publication followed in 1830, with a dedication to Woyciechowski.

== "Hats off, gentlemen, a genius" ==
Robert Schumann (who was born only 3 months after Chopin) first heard the Variations by the then-unknown Polish composer at a performance by Julius Knorr at the Leipzig Gewandhaus on 27 October 1831. This famously caused him to declare, through the voice of his alter ego Eusebius, "Hats off, gentlemen, a genius", in the 7 December 1831 edition of the Allgemeine musikalische Zeitung. (Note: This was Schumann's first piece of music criticism, and curiously, in the very last review of his career, he introduced another young genius to the musical world, Johannes Brahms.) He also practised the work himself for months "in a literally obsessive manner". There is no record that Chopin thanked Schumann for his support at this important early stage of his career.

Schumann's teacher (and future father-in-law) Friedrich Wieck published a very positive review of the Variations in the German periodical Caecilia. Chopin found the review so embarrassingly cloying that he blocked Wieck's attempts to publish it in French. In a letter to a friend, Chopin wrote that Wieck, "instead of being clever, is very stupid" and that he did not want his musical integrity to "die" because of "the imagination of that ... stubborn German”.

Wieck also had his 12-year-old daughter Clara study the work for public performance, and it became a staple of her early repertoire. In her diary of 8 June 1831 (coincidentally Robert Schumann's 21st birthday), she wrote: Chopin's Variations Op. 2, which I learned in eight days, is the hardest piece I have ever seen or played till now. This original, brilliant composition is still so little known that almost every pianist and teacher considers it incomprehensible and impossible to play. In Kassel, Louis Spohr turned pages for her as she played them.

Schumann and Chopin did not meet in person until 27 September 1835, in Leipzig. They met only once more, again in Leipzig, on 12 September 1836. Schumann is known to have written 5 letters to Chopin (only one letter survives), but Chopin never reciprocated. He did not care for Schumann's music, and his only apparent mark of respect towards Schumann is his dedication of the Ballade No. 2 in F major, Op. 38, to him, which may have been out of politeness as much as anything. For his part, Schumann not only dedicated his Kreisleriana, Op. 16, to Chopin, he also wrote his own Variations on Chopin's Nocturne in G minor, Op. 15/3 (first published 1981), in between their two meetings; he wrote a respectful imitation of a Chopin nocturne in a section called simply "Chopin" in Carnaval, Op. 9; and he remained a lifelong staunch champion of Chopin's music, as did his wife Clara (the last concerto she ever played was Chopin's Piano Concerto No. 2 in F minor).

== Adaptations ==
The work, as arranged by John Lanchbery, forms the first part of the music for Frederick Ashton's 1976 ballet A Month in the Country.

== See also ==
- List of variations on a theme by another composer
