= Mazurkas, Op. 68 (Chopin) =

1855 set of four mazurkas

Mazurkas, Op. 68
No. 1, in C major

No. 2, in A minor

No. 3, in F major

No. 4, in F minor
All performed by Christoph Zbinden

The Mazurkas, Op. 68, by Frédéric Chopin are a set of four mazurkas composed between 1827 and 1849 and posthumously published in 1855. A typical performance of all four mazurkas lasts around nine minutes.

- Mazurka in C major, Op. 68, No. 1 (1830)
- Mazurka in A minor, Op. 68, No. 2 (1827)
- Mazurka in F major, Op. 68, No. 3 (1830)
- Mazurka in F minor, Op. 68, No. 4 (1849, often regarded as Chopin's last composition, along with the Mazurka in G minor, Op. 67, No. 2). Initially published by Fontana with only two sections, a third C section was rediscovered on the original manuscript a century later and then realized/reconstructed by Jan Ekier. Other attempts to decipher the sketch's third section exist, including those that consider every ossia and variant as written.
