= Józef Elsner =

Polish composer, music teacher and music theoretician

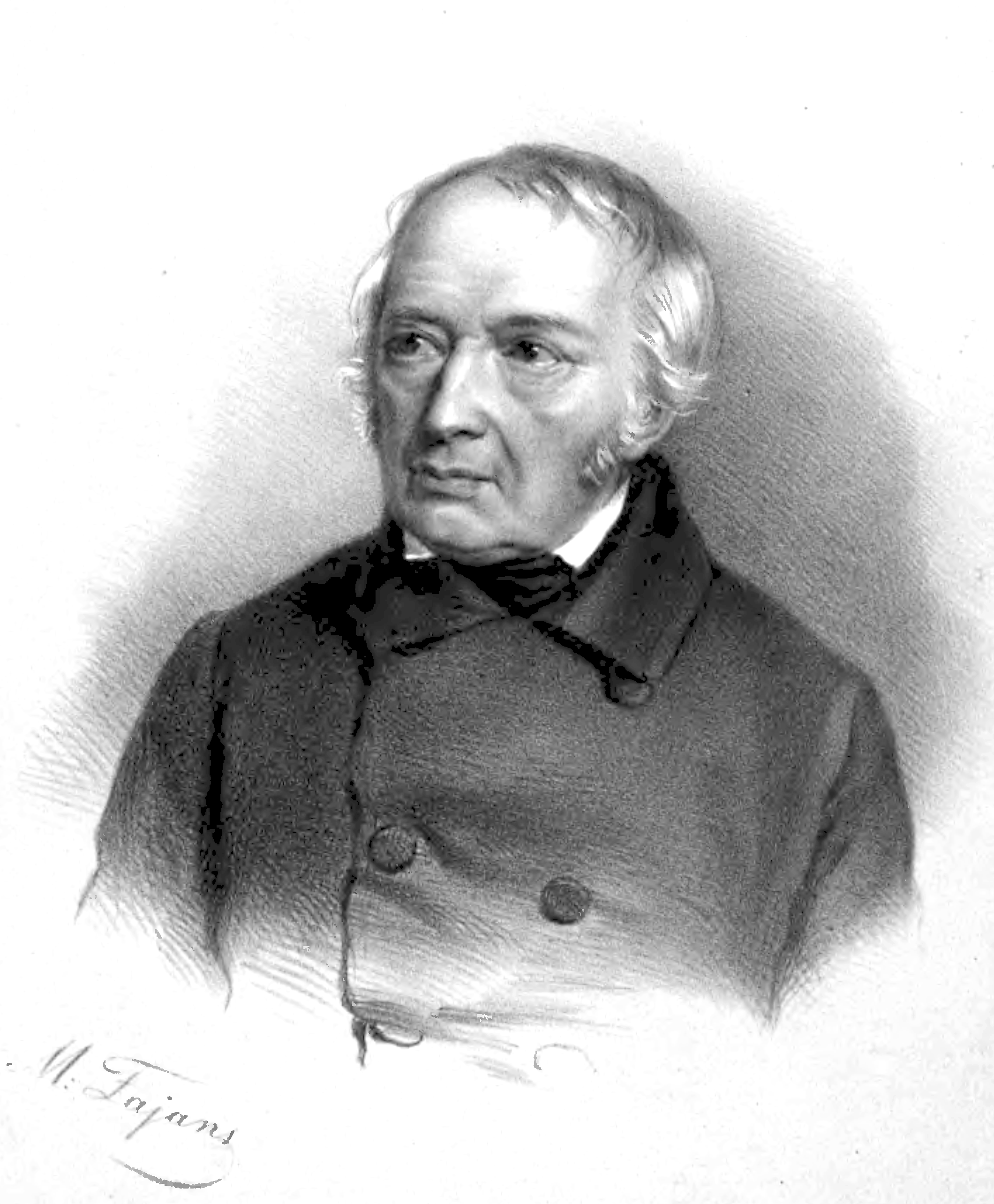
Portrait of Józef Elsner by Maksymilian Fajans, after 1853

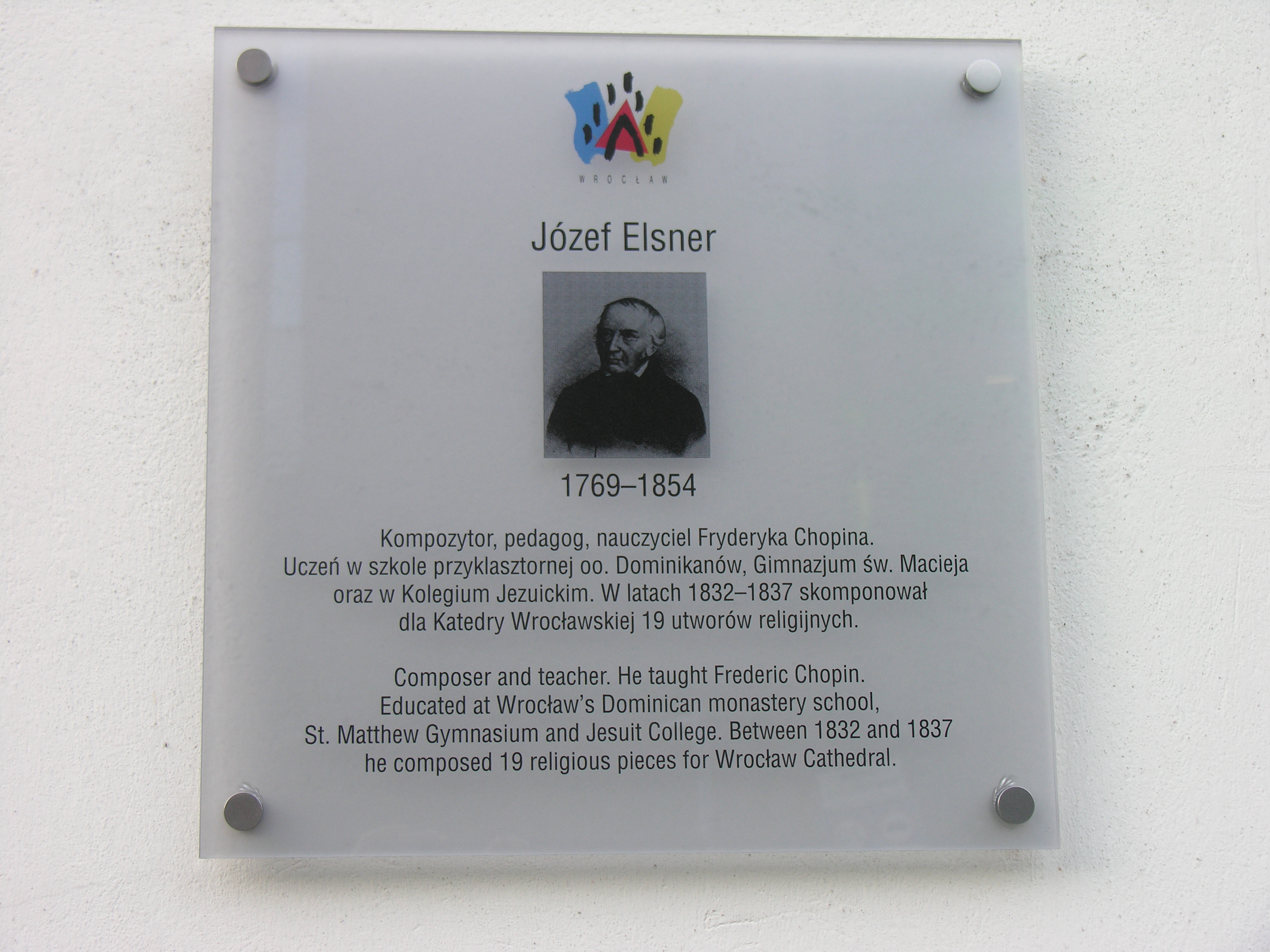
Plaque on former Dominican refectory at Plac Dominikański 2/4, Wrocław, commemorating Elsner's connections with Wrocław.

Józef Antoni Franciszek Elsner (sometimes Józef Ksawery Elsner; baptismal name, Joseph Anton Franz Elsner; 1 June 1769 – 18 April 1854) was a Polish composer, music teacher, and music theoretician, active mainly in Warsaw. He was one of the first composers in Poland to weave elements of folk music into his works.

Elsner composed many symphonic, chamber, solo, and vocal-instrumental works, and works for the stage, including over 100 religious works (masses, offertories, oratorios, cantatas), eight symphonies, three concertos, three ballets, and thirty-eight operas. He is perhaps best known as the principal composition teacher of the young composer Frédéric Chopin.

== Life ==
Józef Elsner was born 1 June 1769 in Grottkau (Grodków), Herzogtum Neisse (Duchy of Nysa), near Breslau (Wrocław), Kingdom of Prussia, to German Silesian Catholic parents Franz Xaver Elsner and Anna Barbara Matzke. His mother was from the famous Matzke family of Glatz, which had intensive contact with Czech culture in Bohemia. Józef Elsner was initially educated for the priesthood at Breslau's Dominican monastery school, St. Matthew's Gymnasium, and a local Jesuit college, but chose the music field. In 1832–37 he would compose nineteen religious pieces for Breslau Cathedral.

After completing his studies at Breslau (Wrocław) and being a violinist at Brünn (Brno), in 1792 he became 2nd Kapellmeister at the German Opera in Austrian-ruled Lemberg (Lviv/Lwów). There, in 1796, he married Klara Abt, who died a year later. In 1799, with Wojciech Bogusławski, he went to New East Prussia (Prussian-ruled Poland) and became the principal conductor, first at the German Theatre, then at the Polish National Theatre in Warsaw.

Elsner traveled to Paris, Dresden and Posen (Poznań), where he met E.T.A. Hoffmann. Together they founded the Musikressource in 1805. In 1802 he married a second wife, Karolina Drozdowska. Due to complaints that he preferred Germans, he resigned from theatre work.

During his decades in Warsaw, Elsner's name and family life gradually polonized. Elsner's ethnicity should not be evaluated in terms of 19th- and 20th-century national identity, as he continued to refer to himself primarily as a Silesian.

In 1799-1824 Elsner was the principal conductor at Warsaw's National Theater, where he premiered a number of his operas. Elsner also taught at the Warsaw Lyceum, housed in the Kazimierz Palace.

Elsner taught the composers Ignacy Feliks Dobrzyński and Frédéric Chopin. There are also indications that he privately tutored piano composer and virtuoso Maria Szymanowska. Chopin dedicated to Elsner his Piano Sonata No. 1 in C minor, Op. 4 (1828), composed while he was studying with Elsner. As Chopin's only composition teacher in 1823–29, Elsner taught him music theory and composition; Elsner diaried of Chopin: "Chopin, Fryderyk, third-year student, amazing capabilities, musical genius."

On 18 April 1854, Elsner died at his estate named for himself, Elsnerów, which now lies within the Warsaw city limits.

== Works - summary ==
Elsner's compositions included

- operas Leszek Biały (Leszek the White) and Król Łokietek (about Władysław I the Elbow-high)
- oratorio, Męka Pana Naszego Jezusa Chrystusa (The Passion of Our Lord Jesus Christ)
- eight symphonies
- polonaises, waltzes, marches
- Mass in B♭ major and Mass in F major
- Nieszpory do NMP (Vespers for the Most Sacred Virgin Mary).

Elsner was one of the first composers to weave elements of Polish folk music into his works.

He also wrote Sumariusz moich utworów muzycznych (Summary of My Musical Works, published 1957).

== Works - detailed list ==
List of the most important compositions:

=== Masses ===
- Missa brevis in F major, Op. 85 on 3-voice male choir and organ (1844)
- Festiva Missa in C major, Op. 52 for 4-voice choir, orchestra and organ (c. 1832)
- Missa in B, Op. 18 on 3-voice male choir (1823)
- Mass in A minor, Op. 24 for 4-voice choir (c. 1823)
- Mass in A minor, Op. 81 for 4-voice choir and orchestra (1843)
- Mass in B♭ major, Op. 3 to 4-voice choir and orchestra (1799)
- Mass in B♭ major, Op. 44 for 2 sopranos, 2 tenors, bass and organ (1829)
- Mass in B♭ major, Op. 80 for 4-voice choir and organ (1843)
- Mass in C major, Op. 22 for 4-voice male choir, 4 horns, trombone and timpani (c. 1823)
- Mass in C major, Op. 26 for 4 solo voices, 4-voice choir and orchestra (1820)
- Mass in D minor and D major in Laudem omnium sanctorum slavonorum Polonorum, Op. 66 for 2 solo voices, 4-voice choir and orchestra (1840)
- Mass in D minor, Op. 16 for 4-voice choir (1823)
- Mass in D minor, Op. 5 for 4-voice choir and orchestra (c. 1806)
- Mass in E minor–E♭ major, Op. 62 for 4 solo voices, 4-voice choir and orchestra (c. 1838)
- Mass in E minor, Op. 88 for 4-voice choir and organ (1846)
- Mass in F major, Op. 20 for 4-voice choir (c. 1823)
- Mass in F major, Op. 35 for 4-voice choir and organ (c. 1825)
- Mass in F major, Op. 41 for 4-voice choir, orchestra and organ (c. 1826)
- Mass in F major, Op. 77 on 3-voice male choir and organ (1843)
- Mass in F major, Op. 79 on 3-voice male choir and organ (1843)
- Mass in G major, Op. 13 on 3-voice male choir and organ (c. 1820)
- Mass in G major, Op. 34 for 4-voice choir and orchestra (c. 1825)
- Mass in G major, Op. 75 for 2 sopranos, violin, viola 2, cello and organ (1842)
- Mass in G minor, Op. 72 for 4 solo voices, 4-voice choir and orchestra (1842)
- Folk Mass in G major, Op. 15 for 2 sopranos and organ (1820)
- Pastoral Mass in A minor, Op. 76 for 4-voice choir, cello and organ (1842)
- Solemn Mass in B♭ major, Op. 47 for 4 solo voices, 4-voice choir and orchestra (c. 1829)
- Solemn Mass in C major (Coronation), Op. 51 for 4 solo voices, 4-voice choir and orchestra (c. 1829). Composed for the coronation of Nicholas I of Russia as King of Poland on 24 March 2829
- Midsummer Mass in F major, Op. 9 to 4 solo voices, 4-voice choir, orchestra and organ (c. 1815)
- Mass, Gradual and Offertory, Op. 87 for 4-voice choir and orchestra (1844)

=== Offertories ===
- Offertoria for 4 voices and orchestra (c. 1783–1784)
- Offertory in A major, Op. 35 (Cantate Domino canticum novum) for 4-voice choir, orchestra and organ (extracted from Mass in F, Op. 35?)
- Offertory in A major, Op. 46 for 4-voice choir and orchestra (c. 1829)
- Offertory B♭ major, Op. 30 (Quoniam in me speravit) for 4-voice choir and orchestra (1828)
- Offertory B♭ major, Op. 45 for 4-voice choir, orchestra and organ (c. 1829)
- Offertory B♭ major, Op. 86 for 4-voice choir and orchestra (1844)
- Offertory in C major, Op. 31 (Expectans expectavi Dominum) for 4-voice choir and orchestra (1823)
- Offertory in C major, Op. 33 for 4-voice choir, orchestra and organ (c. 1824)
- Offertory in C major, Op. 56 (Beatus vir) for 4-voice choir and organ (c. 1835)
- Offertory in D major, Op. 32 (Confirma hoc Deus) for 4-voice choir and orchestra (1824)
- Offertory E♭ major, Op. 4 (In te Domine speravi) for 4-voice choir and orchestra (c. 1806)
- Offertory E major, Op. 83 (Inveni David) for 4-voice choir, solo violin and orchestra (1843)
- Offertory in F major, Op. 50 on 3-voice male choir (c. 1829)
- Offertory in F major, Op. 70 (Tui sunt caeli) for 4-voice choir, orchestra and organ (1840)
- Offertory in F major, Op. 71 for 4-voice choir (1840)
- Offertory in G major, Op. 12 for 4-voice choir and orchestra (c. 1819)
- Offertory in G major, Op. 38 for 4-voice choir, flute obbligato and orchestra (c. 1825)
- Offertory in G major, Op. 48 for 4-voice choir, orchestra and organ (c. 1829)
- Offertory, Op. 58 for choir (c. 1836)

=== Oratorios - Cantatas ===
- Ad festum Corporis Christi 4-voice choir, brass and organ (approx. 1785–1786)
- Hallelujah B♭ major, Op. 60 for 4-voice choir (1836–1840)
- Ave Maria B♭ major, Op. 68 for 4-voice choir and organ (1840)
- Ave Maris Stella in A major, Op. 90 for 4-voice choir, orchestra and organ (1847)
- Benedictus for soprano and instrumental ensemble (c. 1783–1784)
- Cantate zur Feier ... Jubel-in D major, Op. 53 for 4-voice choir and orchestra (1832)
- Canticum Simeonis in E minor, Op. 69 on 5-voice choir (1841)
- Completorium for choir, 2 violins, viola, 2 horns and bodies (c. 1785)
- Der sterbende Jesus for solo voices and chorus (c. 1788–1789)
- Dies irae in F minor, Op. 91 for 4-voice choir and organ (1847)
- Graduate in A major, Op. 82 for 4-voice choir and orchestra (1843)
- Graduate in D major, Op. 94 for bass, 4-voice choir and orchestra (1848)
- Graduate in E♭ major, Op. 57 for soprano, 4-voice choir and orchestra (1835)
- Graduate in F major, Op. 29 (Alleluja! Juravit Dominus) for 4-voice choir and orchestra (1828)
- Graduate and Offertory in A major, Op. 25 for 4-voice choir (c. 1823)
- Graduate and Offertory E♭ major, Op. 19 on 3-voice male choir (1823)
- Graduate and Offertory in F major, Op. 23 for 4-voice male choir, 4 horns and trombone (c. 1823)
- Graduate and Offertory, Op. 17 for 4-voice choir (1823)
- Gradual for 2 sopranos, 2 violins, viola, double bass and 2 horns (c. 1782)
- Lob der Buchdruckerkunst cantata, cantata for solo voice, 4-voice choir and piano (1804)
- Musik zu einer Cantata Trauerloge, cantata for male choir and orchestra (1811)
- Cantata Music to enter the body of Fr. J. Poniatowski in r. 1814 cantata for recitation, choir and orchestra (1814)
- Cantata on the aptly Poles land, cantata for choir and orchestra (1807)
- Welcome dove cantata, cantata for four male voices, violin, cello and piano (1844)
- Cantata us stand with a weapon in his hand, a cantata for recitation, solo voices and chorus (1819)
- Kyrie and Gloria in C major for choir, 2 violins, viola, 2 oboes, horn, trumpet, timpani and organ (approx. 1788–1789)
- Miserere mei Deus, Op. 96 for solo voices, 3 choirs, male choir (1848)
- Motet in C major, Op. 28 2 4-voice choirs
- Motet in G major, Op. 59 for 4 solo voices, 4-voice choir and orchestra (1836)
- Motet Salvum fac emperor in B♭ major, Op. 6, motet for 4-voice choir and orchestra (1807)
- Offertory Motet seu de Sancto Josepho C major, Op. 10 for 4-voice choir and orchestra (c. 1815)
- Vespers in C major, Op. 36 for 4-voice choir and orchestra (c. 1825)
- Vespers in D major, Op. 89 for 4-voice choir and orchestra (1847)
- About gloriosa virginum B♭ major, Op. 92 for 4-voice choir and orchestra (1847)
- The sacred convivium, Op. 49, anthem for 4-voice choir and wind instruments (c. 1829)
- Passio Domini nostri in D minor, Op. 65 for 14 solo voices, 3 4-voice choir and orchestra (1835–1837)
- Our Father, Op. 95 for 4-voice choir and organ (1848)
- Post Celebra ... D major, Op. 11 for soprano, bass, 4-voice choir and orchestra (1815)
- Psalm 133, Op. 63 for 2 choirs (c. 1838)
- Salve Regina in B♭ major, processio funebris in C minor, Psalmus: De Profundis in C minor, Op. 43 for a 3 male voices, 4-voice choir and orchestra (1827)
- Requiem in C minor, Op. 42 for a 3 male voices, cello, brass and timpani (1826)
- Requiem, Op. 2 to 4-voice choir and wind instruments (1793)
- Stabat Mater, Op. 93 for solo voices, chorus and orchestra (1848)
- Laudamus Te Deum in D major, Op. 39 for 4-voice choir, trumpet and timpani (c. 1825)
- Te Deum laudamus, Op. 74 for 2 male choirs 4-Voice (1842)
- Veni Creator in A major, Op. 97 for 4-voice choir and organ (1849)
- Veni Creator in B♭ major, Op. 73 for 4-voice male choir (1842)
- Veni Creator in C major, Op. 72 4-voice choir (1812)
- Veni Creator in G major, Op. 40 for 4-voice choir (c. 1825)
- Veni Creator in G major, Op. 54 for a 5-voice choir and organ (1834)
- Veni Creator, Op. 78 on 3-voice male choir and organ (1843)
- Veni Sancte Spiritus E♭ major, Op. 8 to 4-voice choir and orchestra (1815)

=== Ballets ===
Name	Date of Composition	Date of Premiere	Comments
Divertissement	?	?	-
Two Statues	1818	?	-
Wild Men	1796	?	Track in 1 act

=== Opera ===
- Amazons, or Herminia, opera in 2 acts (1797)
- Andromeda, opera seria in 1 act (1806)
- Der verkleidet Sultan, opera in 3 acts (1795)
- Seltenen Die Brüder oder Die vier Zauberkugeln, opera in 2 acts (1795)
- Jagiełło in Tenczyn, opera in 3 acts (1819)
- Kabbalist, opera in 2 acts (1812)
- Lovers hidden, opera in 2 acts (?)
- Militia or Battle of the Cossacks, komedioopera in 2 acts (1807)
- Seven times one komedioopera in 1 act (1804)
- Canyons of the Sierra Morena, komedioopera in 3 acts (1811)
- King of the Short or Wiśliczanki, opera in 2 acts (1817–1818)
- Leszek the White, or Witch of Łysa Góra, opera in 2 acts (1809)
- Residents of the island Kamkatal, opera in 1 act (1803–1804)
- Old scatterbrain and a young sage, opera in 1 act (1804–1805)
- Sultan Wampum or imprudent wishes, opera in two acts (1800)
- Breakfast trzpiotów, opera in 1 act (1808)
- Delusion and reality, opera in 1 act (c. 1805)
- Urzella soothsayer or This is what the ladies like, opera in 3 acts (1805–1806)

=== Other works for the stage ===
- Benefis, duodrama in 1 act (1809)
- Echo in the forest, duodrama in 1 act (1808)
- La ritrosia disarmata, duodrama in 1 act (1815)
- Cobbler and a seamstress, duodrama in 1 act (1808)
- Wife along the way, duodrama in 1 act (1808)
- Charlemagne and Witykind, drama in two acts (1807)
- The emergence of the nation, lyrical scene in one act (1830)
- Iskahar king Guaxary, melodrama in three acts (1796)
- French corsair in Portugal, melodrama in three acts (?)
- Mieczyslaw Blind, melodrama in three acts (1807)
- Nurzahad or immortality and wealth, melodrama in three acts (1805)
- Sacrifice of Abraham, melodrama in four acts (1821)
- The court of Solomon, melodrama in three acts (1806)
- Sydney and Zuma or power love black women, melodrama in three acts (1798)
- Court invisible or vicious Son, melodrama in three acts (1807)
- Island wives married or chosen by fate, melodrama in three acts (1811)

=== Concertos ===
  Opus 	Key 	Solo instrument 	Date of composition 	Date of premiere
  - 	? 		Flute 	1791-1792 	?
  - 	D major 	Violin 	approx. 1795 	?
  - 	G major 	Violin 	approx. 1783–1784 	?

=== Symphonies ===
  Opus 	Key 	Date of composition 	Date of premiere
  17 	B♭ major 	approx. 1818 	?
  - 	C major 	1796 	?
  11 	C major 	1804-1805 	?
  - 	D major 	1802 	?
  - 	D major 	1788-1789 	?
  - 	D major 	approx. 1818 	?
  - 	E♭ major 	1797 	?
  - 	E♭ major 	1788-1789 	?

=== Chamber works ===
- Three String Quartet, Op. 1 (?)
- Chaconne in G major for violin and piano (1836)
- Piano Quartet in E♭ major, Op. 15 (c. 1805)
- Piano Quartet in F major (c. 1800)
- Quartet for 2 violins and violas 2 (c. 1798)
- Three String Quartet, Op. 8: No. 1 in C major, No. 2 in E♭ major, No. 3 in D minor (1796)
- String Quartet in B♭ major (?)
- String Quintet (?)
- String Quintet in C minor (?)
- Septet in D major for flute, clarinet, violin, viola, cello, double bass and piano (c. 1830)
- Piano Sonata in F major (c. 1798)
- Sonata in B♭ major for piano 4 hands, Op. 16 (?)
- Sonata in D major for Violin and Piano, Op. 10, No. 2 (c. 1798)
- Sonata in E♭ major for violin and piano, Op. 10, No. 3 (c. 1798)
- Sonata in F major for Violin and Piano, Op. 10, No. 1 (c. 1798)
- Piano Sonata in B♭ major (c. 1798)
- Piano Sonata in D major (c. 1798)
- Piano Trio in C major (c. 1798)
- Trio Grande Sonate in B♭ major, piano trio (1798)

=== Small orchestral and instrumental ===
- Karnevaltanze for orchestra (1792–1799)
- March for orchestra (1831)
- March of the Polish army vanguard for orchestra (1831)
- Triumphal march for wind orchestra (1809)
- March with echo and Andante for orchestra (?)
- Mazurka for orchestra (c. 1825)
- Polonaise in D major for orchestra (1818)
- Polonaise in D major for violin and piano (?)
- Polonaise in D major for violin and piano (1820)
- Polonaise in E major on the theme of the overture to the opera "Lodoiska" R. Kreutzer for orchestra (1804)
- Polonaise in E♭ major for violin and piano (1820)
- Polonaise in F major for orchestra (1818)
- Polonaise on the march from the opera "Water Carrier" L. Cherubini for orchestra (1804)
- Polonaise on the song "Ou peut-on etre mieux ..." for orchestra (1816)
- Rondo a la Krakowiak B♭ major for piano (1803)
- Rondo a la Mazurka in C major for piano (1803)
- Rondo a la Mazurka in G minor for piano (1803)
- Trois quatuors meilleur du goût anglais for strings (1798)
- Trois quatuors for strings (c. 1796)
- Rollers region for orchestra (c. 1791–1792)
- Rollers Viennese orchestra (c. 1790–1791)
- Variations in B♭ major on the march from the opera "Przerwana ofiara" ("Interrupted victim") (P. Winter), for piano (1802)
- Variations on the aria from the opera "Żony przemienione czyli Szewc" ("The shoemaker's wife transformed") (M. A. Portogalla) for orchestra (1810)

== See also ==
- List of Poles
