= Andante spianato et grande polonaise brillante =

Composition by Frédéric Chopin

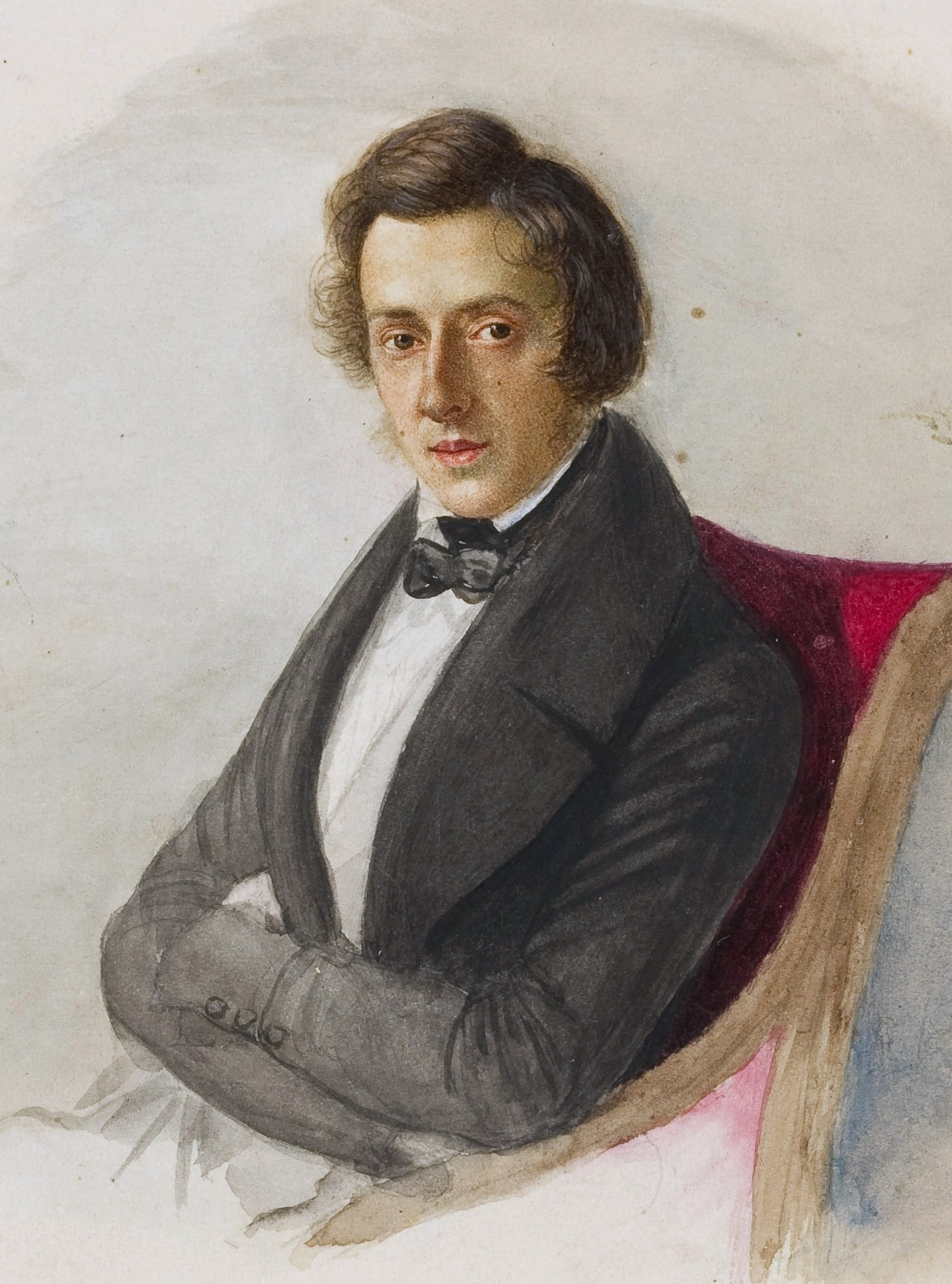
Frédéric Chopin at 25, by his fiancée Maria Wodzińska, 1835

Andante spianato et grande polonaise brillante in E♭ major, Op. 22, was composed by Frédéric Chopin between 1830 and 1834. The Grande polonaise brillante in E♭, set for piano and orchestra, was written first, in 1830–31. In 1834, Chopin wrote an Andante spianato in G major, for piano solo, which he added to the start of the piece, and joined the two parts with a fanfare-like sequence. The combined work (both orchestrated version and solo piano version) was published in 1836, and was dedicated to Madame d'Este.

== Music ==
The Grande polonaise brillante is a work for piano and orchestra, although the piano part is often played on its own. The Andante spianato (spianato means "even" or "smooth") for solo piano was composed as an introduction to the polonaise after Chopin received a long-awaited invitation to perform in one of Habeneck’s Conservatoire Concerts in Paris. This was the only time Chopin ever used the term spianato as a description for any of his works.

Chopin’s first work, written at age seven, had been a polonaise. Chopin also used the polonaise form in his earlier work the Introduction and Polonaise brillante in C major, Op. 3. The Grande polonaise brillante of 1830–31 was to be the last such he would compose for several years. It preoccupied Chopin in his final months at Warsaw. It was finished at Vienna in 1831.

== Movements ==
Andante spianato et grande polonaise brillante in E♭ major, Op. 22 (piano solo)
Performed by Olga Gurevich

- Andante spianato in G major

The quiet rippling effects of this introductory section are borne in a gentle 6/8, rounded with a processional 3/4 chorale in the form of a mazurka. The serene middle section (in G major) serves merely as a contrasting episode to complement the overall texture of the movement rather than a formal trio.

- Grande polonaise brillante in E♭ major

The polonaise opens in fanfare and moves into an ebullient dance form.

== In popular culture ==
The 2002 film The Pianist concludes with this polonaise.

The song “La Soledad” by pop band Pink Martini begins with an excerpt of the Andante spianato movement and makes use of various melodies from the piece throughout the song.
