= Julian Fontana =

Polish pianist and composer (1810–1869)

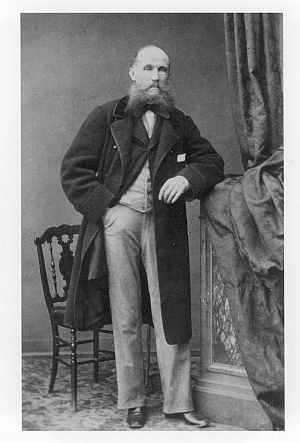
Julian Fontana (c. 1860)

Julian (or Jules) Fontana (31 July 1810 (Note: His date of birth was officially registered as 31 July 1810, but it is likely that he was born on another date.) — 23 December 1869) was a Polish pianist, composer, lawyer, author, translator, and entrepreneur, best remembered as a close friend and musical executor of Polish composer Frédéric Chopin.

== Life ==
Born in Warsaw to a family of Italian origin, Fontana studied law at the University of Warsaw and music under Józef Elsner at the conservatory, where he met Chopin. Fontana left Warsaw in 1831, after the November Uprising and settled in Hamburg, before becoming a pianist and teacher in Paris in 1832.

In 1835, in London, he participated in a concert with music played by 6 pianists, the others including Ignaz Moscheles, Johann Baptist Cramer and Charles-Valentin Alkan.

From 1836 to 1838, he lived together with Chopin in his apartment on Chaussée-d'Antin no. 38.

In 1840, Chopin dedicated his 2 Polonaises, Op. 40, to Fontana. These included the "Military Polonaise" in A major.

He took up a wandering life that included:

- England and France (1833–1837);
- Havana, Cuba (1844–45): On 8 July 1844, he played the music of Chopin for the first time in Cuba. His pupils there included Nicolás Ruiz Espadero.
- New York (1845–51): he gave concerts with Camillo Sivori;
- Montgeron, Paris (1852) – becoming part of the literary scene and friends with Adam Mickiewicz.

In New York, on 9 September 1850, Fontana married Camilla Dalcour Tennant (1818–1855), widow of Stephen Cattley Tennant (1800–1848), a merchant, and mother of Enriqueta Augustina Tennant (1843–1908) and four other children. Their son Julian Camillo Adam Fontana was born in Paris on 10 July 1853. Camilla died on 30 March 1855 of pneumonia, while pregnant with her 7th child. Fontana took her children from her first marriage to be looked after by her first husband's family in England. He then returned to New York, where he was naturalised as an American citizen on 7 September the same year.

Also in 1855, he published a collection of Chopin's unpublished manuscripts, under the opus numbers 66–73. He also considered publishing more private details concerning Chopin:

"I would have as much to say about the man as about the artist [Chopin]. And when his profound diplomacy, allied to his extraordinary wit, concealed from the world what was not a secret to me, who lived with him for almost thirty years in confidence; on raising the veil, I would show him not entirely as general opinion wishes to have him;" (Julian Fontana to Stanisław Egbert Koźmian, 6 June 1851)

He then travelled to Cuba in an unsuccessful bid to recover his late wife's estate. He spent some years travelling between Havana, New York, Paris and Poland. In 1859, he published 16 of Chopin's Polish Songs, as Op. 74 (a later edition increased this to 17 songs).

In 1860, Louis Moreau Gottschalk dedicated two compositions to Fontana, La Gitanella and Illusions perdues.

In the 1860s Fontana translated Cervantes' Don Quixote into Polish. In 1869, he published a book of folk astronomy.

He succumbed to deafness and poverty, and committed suicide by inhaling carbon monoxide aged 59 in Paris. He was buried in Montmartre Cemetery. He had arranged, prior to his death, to have his son looked after by his wife's family in England.

== Sources ==
- Dziębowska, E. (2007) "Fontana, Julian, Grove Music Online, access date 19 August 2007 (subscription required)
- Ekier, J. (2000). Chopin Studies 7. Warsaw: Frederick Chopin Society. pp. 3–77.
- Farnie, D.A. (2006) "Rylands, Enriqueta Augustina (1843–1908)", Oxford Dictionary of National Biography, Oxford University Press, online edn, Oct 2006, accessed 20 August 2007 (subscription, Wikipedia Library access or UK public library membership required)
- Ferrer, C. T. (1988). "Julian Fontana: El introductor de Chopin en Cuba". Revista de Musicologia: 1–28.
- Hardynski, W. (1948) "Jules Fontana", Polski Slownik Biograficzny, 7.58–9
- Janta, A. (1982). A History of Nineteenth Century American-Polish Music. New York: Kosciuszko Foundation. ISBN 99929-993-3-0.
- Michałowski, K. (1970). Bibliografia Chopinowska 1849–1969. Kraków.
- Poradowska, M. (1902). "Lettres inédites de Fredéric Chopin au compositeur Fontana". Revue Hebdomadaire: 25 January.
- Sydow, B.E., ed. (1955). Korespondencja Fryderyka Chopina. Warsaw., French translation, 1953–60; English translation, abridged, 1962
