= List of operas by Carl Maria von Weber =

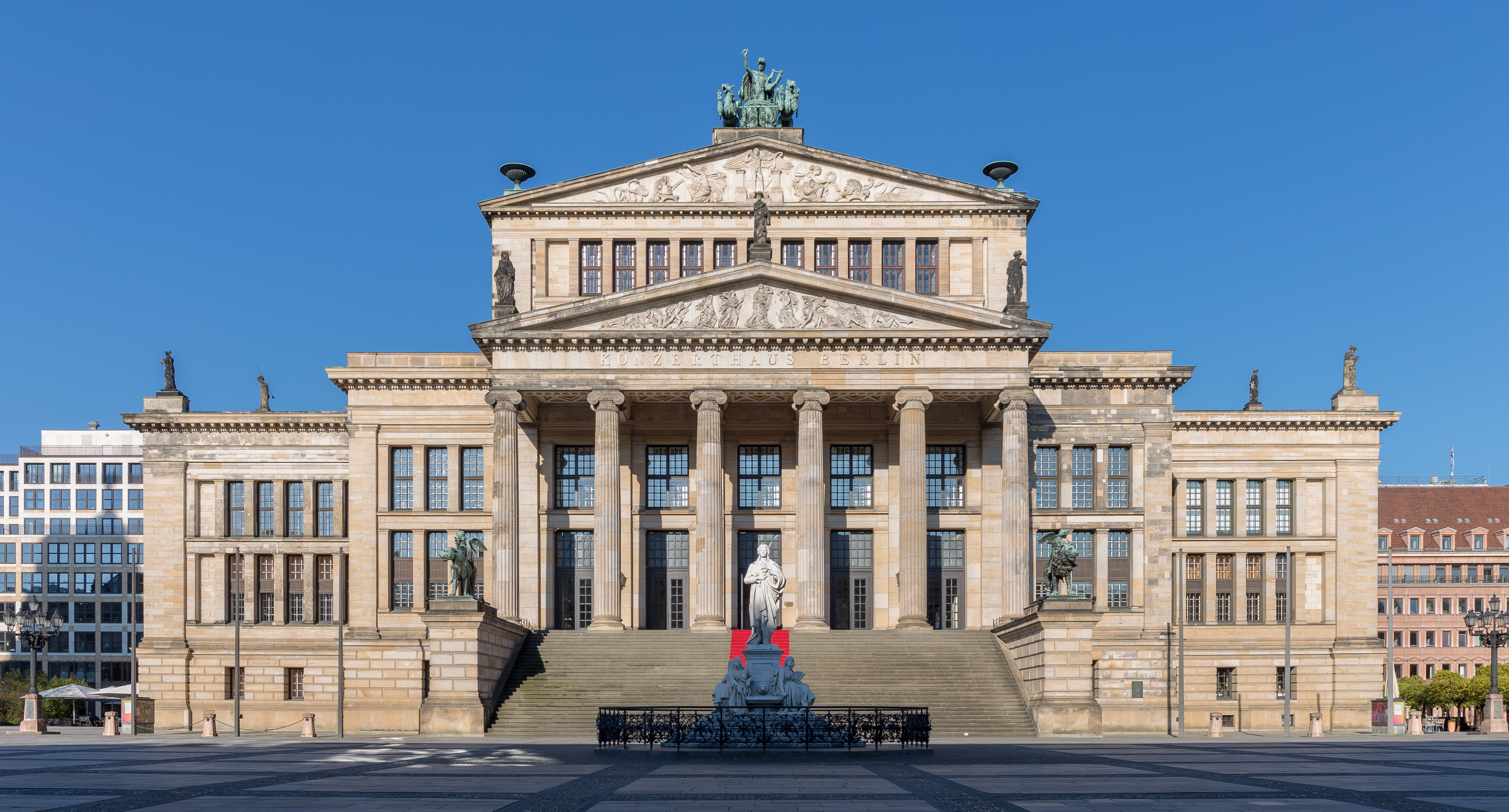
The Schauspielhaus Berlin (now Konzerthaus Berlin) where Weber's most famous opera, Der Freischütz, premiered in 1821

The German composer Carl Maria von Weber (1786–1826) is best known for his operas, of which he wrote 10 between 1798 and 1826. His first four exist in various states: Die Macht der Liebe und des Weins (comp. 1798) is completely lost; two fragments survive for Das Waldmädchen (1800); the libretto to Peter Schmoll und seine Nachbarn (1803) is lost; and only three numbers from Rübezahl (comp. 1804–05) survive. Weber's mature operas—Silvana (1810), Abu Hassan (1811), Der Freischütz (1821), Die drei Pintos (comp. 1820–21), Euryanthe (1823), Oberon (1826)—all survive intact; they were all performed within his lifetime, except Die drei Pintos which was posthumously completed by Gustav Mahler. His contributions to the genre were crucial in the development of German Romantische Oper (German Romantic Opera) and its national identity, exhibiting much influence on Richard Wagner. Der Freischütz, his most famous and significant work, remains among the most revered German operas.

After his family moved to Munich in 1798, the 13 year old Weber began study with Johann Nepomuk Kalcher, under whose supervision he wrote his first opera, the Singspiel Die Macht der Liebe und des Weins; the work was never performed. Two years later in Freiburg, he embarked on his second opera, Das Waldmädchen, to a libretto by Carl von Steinsberg, whose traveling company premiered it the same year. The two surviving fragments of the work show little sophistication, although it received moderate success. Weber's next opera, Peter Schmoll und seine Nachbarn, was written in Salzburg under the supervision of Michael Haydn to a libretto by Josef Türk after Carl Gottlob Cramer's popular novel of the same name. Premiered in 1803 in Augsburg, the work did not match the novel's popularity and was subsequently forgotten. In 1804 Weber was appointed Kapellmeister at the Breslau Opera and worked with a libretto by the theatre's director Johann Gottlieb Rhode (after a story by Johann Karl August Musäus), to produce Rübezahl. The work was never performed and the three extant fragments show little improvement in his craft. After his two-year tenure, Weber spent time in modern-day Pokój, Opole Voivodeship and eventually moved to Stuttgart where he began Silvana.

Weber's first operatic success came with Silvana, on a libretto by Franz Carl Hiemer that was reworked from Steinsberg's earlier one to Das Waldmädchen. While its initial premiere in 1810 in Frankfurt was only moderately successful, a Berlin premiere was very well received. When in Stuttgart, Weber and Hiemer had also begun a short Singspiel based on One Thousand and One Nights, Abu Hassan, which premiered in 1811 Munich to a second success for Weber. His operatic composition paused following his appointment as director of the Opera in Prague, but resumed in 1817 when he became director of the Dresden Opera and began work on Der Freischütz, based on Johann Apel's "The Fatal Marksman", an adaptation of the Freischütz tale. Briefly interrupted by a canceled royal commission for an opera entitled Alcindor, Der Freischütz premiered in 1821 in Berlin with a libretto by Johann Friedrich Kind and was extremely well received. Weber immediately began writing the Komische oper (comic opera) Die drei Pintos, to a libretto by Theodor Hell after Carl Seidel’s novel Der Brautkampf, but put it aside when the success of Der Freischütz led to a commission from the prestigious Kärntnertortheater in Vienna. Die drei Pintos was left incomplete for the remainder of his life. His widow later approached Weber's friend and composer Giacomo Meyerbeer about completing the work; he did nothing with the sketches for 20 years. Eventually, Weber's grandson, Carl von Weber, revised the text, and Mahler completed the music, premiering the work in 1888 at the Neues Stadttheater, Leipzig. The Kärntnertortheater commission resulted in the Grosse Heroisch-Romantische Oper (Great Heroic-Romantic opera) Euryanthe, on a libretto by Helmina von Chézy after a 13th-century French romance, (Note: An anonymous 13th-century French romance entitled: L'Histoire du très-noble et chevalereux prince Gérard, comte de Nevers et la très-virtueuse et très chaste princesse Euriant de Savoye, sa mye.) which premiered at the Kärntnertortheater in 1823 to much praise. Weber's fame from Der Freischütz led to another important commission, this time from the Royal Opera House, London. For this he composed his final opera and only one in English, Oberon, to a libretto by James Planché, based on Christoph Martin Wieland's epic poem of the same name. The work received much acclaim. Weber died in London less than two months later.

== List of operas ==
Operas by Carl Maria von Weber
Period (Note: Period during which the opera was written)	Title	Status	Genre	Acts	Librettist	Premiere		J. (Note: Jähns; catalogue numbers of Weber's works as compiled by Friedrich Wilhelm Jähns in his Carl Maria von Weber in seinen Werken: chronologisch-thematisches Verzeichniss seiner sämtlichen Compositionen (1871). Not all works—primarily those lost and not performed in his lifetime—have opus numbers.) Op.	WeV (Note: Catalogue number from Carl-Maria-von-Weber-Gesamtausgabe, the critical edition of Weber's works. The links provided are to the online version of the Carl-Maria-von-Weber-Gesamtausgabe, a database of Weber's life and complete works)
Period	Title	Status	Genre	Acts	Librettist	Date	Venue	J. Op.	WeV
1798	Die Macht der Liebe und des Weins (The Power of Love and Wine) (Note: Alternatively translated as: The Force of Love and Wine)	Completely lost (Note: Probably destroyed in a fire at the house of Johann Nepomuk Kalcher, Weber's teacher)	Singspiel	? acts	Unknown	Unperformed		Anh. 6	C.1
1800	Das Waldmädchen (Note: Also known as Das stumme Waldmädchen or Das Mädchen im Spessarter Wald) (The Girl of the Forest) (Note: Alternatively translated as: The Forest Maiden)	Fragments (Note: Two fragments survive; the work was previously thought to be completely lost until 2000 when these fragments were discovered by Natalia Gubkina in the Russian archive of the Mariinsky State Theater. Much of the music was probably reworked into Silvana.)	Romantische Oper	2 acts	Steinsberg	24 November 1800	Freiberg, Buttermarkt	Anh. 1	C.2
1801–02 (Note: Weber revised the overture of Peter Schmoll und seine Nachbarn as the stand-alone piece Grande ouverture à plusieurs instruments in 1807.)	Peter Schmoll und seine Nachbarn (Peter Schmoll and his Neighbours)	Dialogue lost	Singspiel? (Note: Morgan (2017, p. 14) lists it as a singspiel while Brown (2002a, "Works") does not even though it lists other works (e.g. Die Macht der Liebe und des Weins and Abu Hassan) as singspiels.)	2 acts	Türk after Cramer	March? 1803	Augsburg	J. 8 Op. 8	C.3
1804–05 (Note: Weber revised the overture of Rübezahl as the stand-alone piece Der Beherrscher der Geister in 1801.)	Rübezahl	Fragments (Note: Three nos. survive)	Opera	2 acts	Rhode after Musäus	Unperformed		J. 44–6	C.4
1808–10	Silvana	Survived	Romantische Oper	3 acts	Hiemer after Steinsberg (Note: Hiemer based Silvana on Steinsberg's libretto for Weber's earlier opera, Das Waldmädchen.)	16 September 1810	Frankfurt	J. 87; Score	C.5
1810–11	Abu Hassan	Survived	Singspiel	1 act	Hiemer after One Thousand and One Nights	4 June 1811	Residenz, Munich	J. 106; Score	C.6
1817–21 (Note: Morgan (2017, p. 104) notes that discussion for the work's conception may have begun as early as 1810.)	Der Freischütz (The Freeshooter)	Survived	Romantische Oper	3 acts	Kind after Apel and Laun	18 June 1821	Schauspielhaus, Berlin	J. 277; Op. 77; Score	C.7
1820–21	Die drei Pintos (The Three Pintos)	Incomplete; Completed by Mahler 1887	Komische Oper	3 acts	Hell after Seidel; Revisions by Carl von Weber (text) and Mahler (music)	20 January 1888	Neues Stadt, Leipzig	Anh. 5 Score	C.8
1822–23	Euryanthe	Survived	Grosse Heroisch-Romantische Oper	3 acts	Helmina after a 13th-century French romance	25 October 1823	Kärntnertortheater, Vienna	J. 291; Op. 81; Score	C.9
1825–26	Oberon	Survived	Romantische Oper	3 acts	Planché after Wieland (Note: Oberon is Weber's only opera with an English libretto.)	12 April 1826	Royal Opera House, London	J. 306; Score	C.10
