= Die drei Pintos =

Opera by Carl Maria von Weber

- Comic opera by Carl Maria von Weber completed by Gustav Mahler
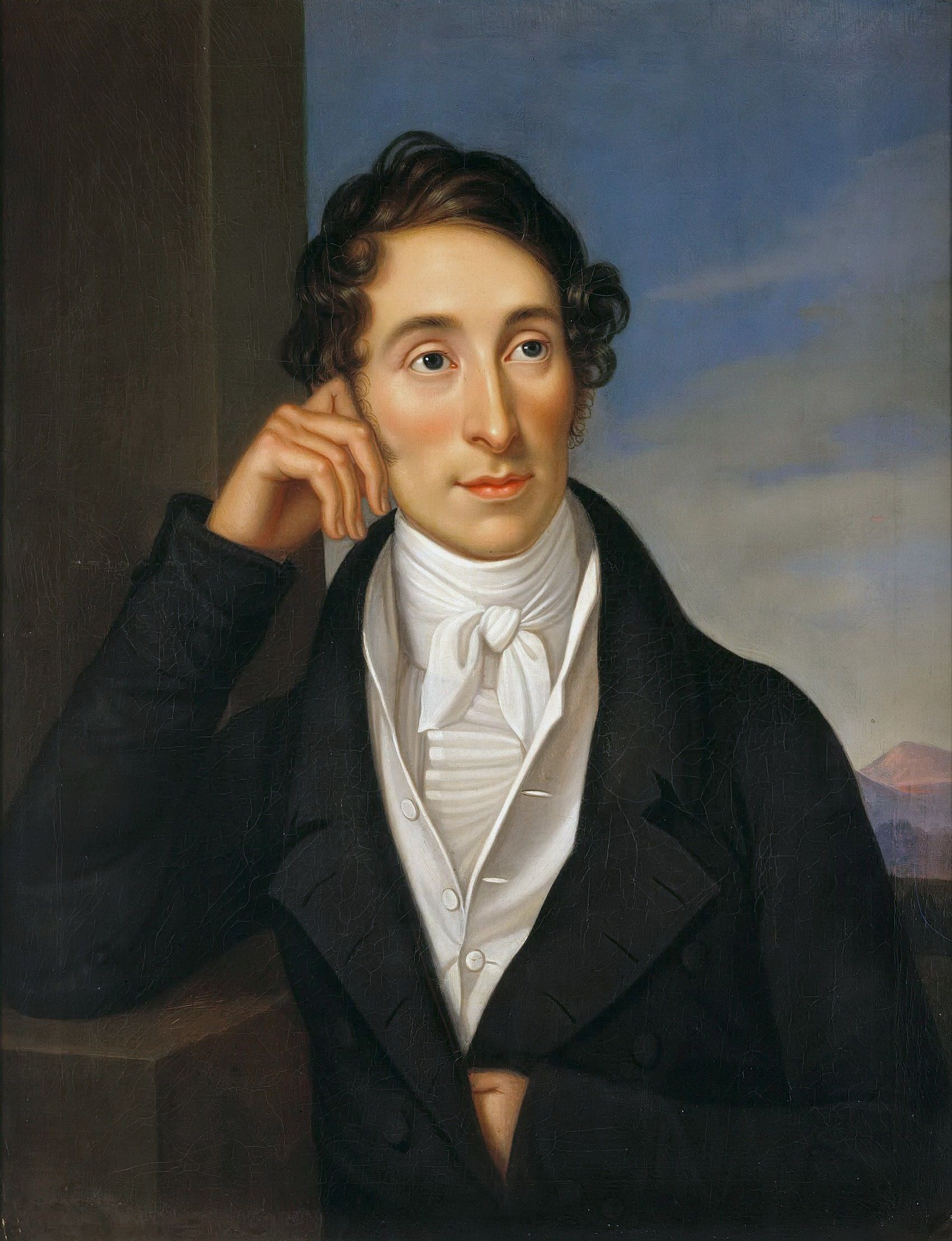
- Carl Maria von Weber, by Caroline Bardua, 1821
- Translation: The Three Pintos
- Librettist: Theodor Hell
- Language: German
- Based on: Der Brautkampf by Carl Seidel
- Premiere: 20 January 1888; Neues Stadttheater, Leipzig

Die drei Pintos (Anh 5, The Three Pintos) is a comic opera of which Carl Maria von Weber began composing the music, working on a libretto by Theodor Hell. The work was completed about 61 years after Weber's death by Gustav Mahler. It premiered on 20 January 1888 at the Neues Stadttheater in Leipzig.

== Composition history ==
In 1821, Theodor Hell developed a drama called The Battle for the Bride, with a story taken from the novel Der Brautkampf (1819) by Carl Seidel. Hell gave his friend Weber the text, but Weber disliked the title and changed it to Die drei Pintos ("The Three Pintos"). The title comes from the protagonist, Don Pinto, who is impersonated by two other characters in the course of the opera.

Weber began composing the score and worked at it off and on from then until 1824, but other work including Euryanthe intervened and it remained incomplete at his death in 1826. All that existed, so far, were a number of coded fragments of music: 7 sketches for 17 numbers, and an unknown total of bars scored out of an eventual total of 1700 bars.

Weber's bereaved family made a number of unsuccessful attempts to have Die drei Pintos completed, but eventually his widow Caroline took the draft to Giacomo Meyerbeer, a composer, and friend of Theodor Hell. For some reason, Meyerbeer did nothing and – 26 years later, just before Caroline died – the fragments were returned to her untouched. Her son Max then approached various composers seeking one who would finish the opera, but he was advised to "give up".

After Max's death in 1881, his son Carl (Carl senior's grandson) inherited the composer's musical estate, and vigorously continued the task of trying to find someone to complete the opera. He eventually encountered the 26-year-old Gustav Mahler, who was working as second conductor at the Stadttheater Leipzig for the 1886/87 season. Mahler was keen to help, and became a regular visitor at the Webers' residence (ostensibly to deal with operatic matters though he was also enamoured of Carl's wife Marion; Carl tried to ignore that situation as best he could).

In the spring of 1887, Mahler cracked C. M. von Weber's code, unscrambled the drafts, and wrote instrumentations for the existing fragments in accordance with Weber's wishes. A further 13 musical numbers were needed in addition to the existing 7, and Mahler went ahead and composed this music himself, based on Weber's themes. It was decided that the original format of the opera should be kept: a dialogue with musical numbers. The interlude music between Acts I and II (Pinto's dream) and the two-part finale of Act III were written by Mahler, although still based on Weber's leitmotifs and themes.

== Roles ==
Roles, voice types, premier cast
Role	Voice type	Premiere cast, 20 January 1888 Conductor: Gustav Mahler
Don Pantaleone Roiz de Pacheco, a nobleman	bass	Bernhard Köhler
Don Gomez de Freiros, a nobleman	tenor	Jakob Hübner
Clarissa, Don Pantaleone's daughter	soprano	Emma Baumann
Laura, Clarissa's maid	mezzo-soprano	Josefine von Artner
Don Gaston de Viratos, a former student	tenor	Charles Hedmondt
Ambrosio, Don Gaston's servant	baritone	Otto Schelper
Don Pinto de Fonseca, a young country squire	bass	Karl Grengg
Inez, the Innkeeper's daughter	soprano	Therese Rothauser
Innkeeper	bass	August Proft
Major-domo	tenor	
Chorus: students, villagers and servants of Don Pantaleone

== Synopsis ==
Time: Late 17th century
Place: Moorish Spain

=== Act 1 ===
Don Gaston de Viratos is taking leave of his friends before leaving for Madrid, where he is set to become a government official and also hopes to find a bride. Inez, daughter of the innkeeper, tells him (by way of a warning) of the "romance of the lovesick cat Mansor", the song of a faithless lover who, despite burning lover's oaths, leaves his Zaide in the lurch.

Now Don Pinto de Fonseca, a foolish country squire, appears; he is also on his way to Madrid, to marry Donna Clarissa. The marriage has been arranged between the two fathers and he is worried about his first meeting with the girl, whom he has never met: how does one woo one's future wife? Gaston proceeds to teach him all the arts of the fiery lover – his servant Ambrosio having to play the part of the bride.

When Pinto, now exhausted, turns to food and drink, Gaston decides to save the unknown girl from this uncouth wooer: he makes Pinto drunk and takes from him the letter promising marriage. To the amusement of the other guests at the inn, Gaston and Ambrosio put the sleeping Don Pinto to bed, so that he can sleep off his drunkenness and they can proceed to Madrid.

=== Act 2 ===
Don Pantaleone Roiz de Pacheco has assembled all his servants, and they are wondering why. He then appears himself, and announces the marriage of his daughter Clarissa to the son of a friend, Don Pinto. In the general joy which ensues, nobody notices Clarissa's despair: she loves Don Gomez de Freiros, and wants to marry no other. Her love has had to be kept secret, because Gomez was forced into hiding following a duel. Clarissa's servant Laura consoles and encourages her. She brings Gomez to the house secretly, and he is determined to defend his love with his sword.

=== Act 3 ===
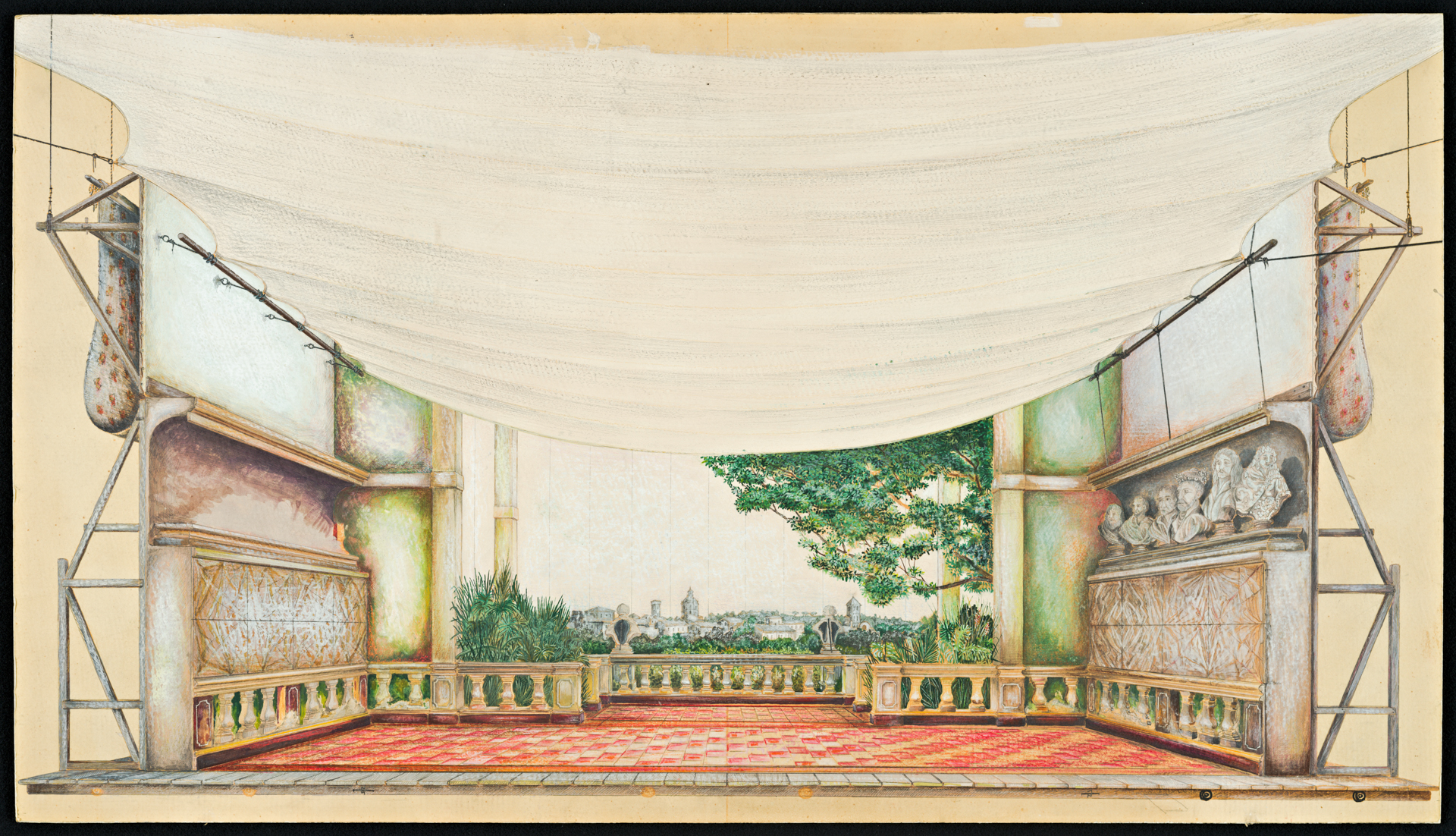
Sketch by Paolo Bregni for the 1975 production at the Teatro Regio in Turin

Laura and the servants are preparing the hall in Don Pantaleone's palace for the wedding. Gaston and Ambrosio discover Laura, whom Ambrosio succeeds in winning for himself. Gomez comes across Gaston, whom he takes to be Don Pinto; and he reveals to him his love for Clarissa. The false Pinto (Gaston) insists upon the rights of the stolen letter with its promise of marriage, and challenges Clarissa's lover (Gomez) to a duel. Gomez, anxious to avoid any insult, offers him satisfaction. However Pinto-Gaston generously releases the girl before Pantaleone's people come to greet the bridegroom, and they decide that Don Gomez will present himself as (that is, claim to be) Don Pinto to get around the plans of the bride's father.

Don Pantaleone is just bringing in his daughter, the bride, when the real Pinto enters the hall. Nobody believes his assurances that he is Don Pinto de Fonseca, and when he tries to show his bride the art of wooing learned from the student Gaston, he is ridiculed. He then notices Gaston and rushes at him so angrily that the latter has to threaten him with his sword. Don Pinto is thrown out, Gaston and Ambrosio are satisfied with the outcome of their adventure, and nothing now stands in the way of the marriage between Clarissa and Gomez.

== Performance history ==
Mahler had been an admirer of Weber, and in this way he succeeded in creating a complete opera which was premiered at the Neues Stadttheater, Leipzig, on 20 January 1888, with Mahler conducting. Richard Strauss admired the work, but appears to have changed his opinion after his mentor Hans von Bülow panned it; like Bülow, the influential critic Eduard Hanslick was also critical.

After Mahler's death (1911) Die drei Pintos gradually disappeared from regular production. Although it is rarely produced nowadays, the "Intermezzo", composed entirely by Mahler based on melodies by Weber, hints at the flute calls (echoed by other wind instruments such as the oboe and bassoon) in the slow section of the first movement of Mahler's Symphony No. 1.

Performances are rare. There was a production at the John Lewis Theatre in London on 10 April 1962, which claimed to be the first in England, and a concert performance at the Edinburgh International Festival in 1976. The American première, given by the Opera Theatre of Saint Louis, took place on 6 June 1979, and in June 1997 a concert performance was given as part of the Vienna Festival. In January 1998, seven fully staged performances in a new production conducted by Geoffrey Moull were given by the Bielefeld Opera in Germany. In February 1998, three performances in English were given in a fully staged production by Opera Omnibus in Haslemere, England. A concert performance of Zychowicz's edition of the opera was conducted by Leon Botstein at the Bard Music Festival in Fall 2002. In October 2003, there were six performances of a new production at the Wexford Festival. In January 2010, the Bronx Opera gave the New York staged the premiere of an English-language version of the work. In March 2011, there were four performances by UCOpera at the Bloomsbury Theatre, London. In 2013 it was performed by Moscow Pokrovsky Chamber Musical Theatre, conducted by Gennady Rozhdestvensky.

== Recordings ==
- Werner Hollweg, Hermann Prey, Lucia Popp et al., Munich Philharmonic, conductor Gary Bertini (studio recording, RCA Red Seal, 1976).
- Gunnar Gudbjörnsson, Alessandro Svab, Barbara Zechmeister et al., Wexford Festival Opera Chorus, National Philharmonic Orchestra of Belarus, conductor Paolo Arrivabeni (live performance, Naxos, 2004).
