= Bronx Opera =

Opera company in The Bronx, New York City

Bronx Opera (BxO) is an opera company in the Bronx, New York. It was founded in 1967 by artistic director and music director, the conductor Michael Spierman. The company is a member of the New York Opera Alliance.

The company performs two operas a year, one lesser known work, and an opera from the standard repertoire. All productions are sung in English with full orchestra and chorus. Additionally, the company presents concerts of opera excerpts throughout the year. The company's opera orchestra is increased to full-size to form the fully professional Orchestra of the Bronx which gives two free concerts every year.

Opera performances are at Lehman College's Lovinger Theatre and Hunter College's Kaye Playhouse in Manhattan's Upper East Side; concerts are given in the Bronx and surrounding areas from Long Island to Delaware County.

== Origins ==
In 1966, a group of musicians were attempting to put together a performance of Handel's Messiah. While this performance never happened, it was the genesis of what became the Bronx Opera. Michael Spierman, a recent graduate of New York University's University Heights campus in the Bronx (now Bronx Community College of the City University of New York) took the core of the group that was to perform the Messiah and combined it with his intention to form an opera company that would be based at the Bronx NYU campus. This organization was to be known as the Heights Opera. Under this name the group first performed on November 24, 1967, at Vladeck Hall of the Amalgamated Housing Cooperative; the opera was Mozart's Così fan tutte.

== Repertoire ==
Year	Composer	Opera
1967	Mozart	Così fan tutte
1968	Mozart	The Abduction from the Seraglio
1970	Gilbert & Sullivan	Iolanthe
1970	Mozart	The Marriage of Figaro
1971	Verdi	La traviata
1971	Weber	Der Freischütz
1972	Menotti	The Medium
1972	Mozart	The Impresario
1972	Rossini	The Barber of Seville
1973	Humperdinck	Hansel and Gretel
1973	Mozart	Don Giovanni
1974	Britten	Albert Herring (Note: New York premiere)
1974	Mozart	The Magic Flute
1975	Donizetti	The Elixir of Love
1975	Offenbach	Ba-ta-clan
1975	Schubert	The Conspirators
1976	Copland	The Tender Land
1976	Gilbert & Sullivan	The Pirates of Penzance
1976	Mozart	Così fan tutte
1977	Auber	Fra Diavolo
1977	Verdi	La traviata
1978	Donizetti	Don Pasquale
1978	Vaughan Williams	Sir John in Love
1979	Mozart	The Abduction from the Seraglio
1979	Offenbach	Orpheus in the Underworld
1980	Floyd	Susannah
1980	Gounod	The Doctor in Spite of Himself
1981	Mussorgsky/Blatt	The Fair at Sorochinsk
1981	Weber	Abu Hassan
1981	Mozart	The Marriage of Figaro
1982	Vaughan Williams	Hugh the Drover
1982	Mozart	The Magic Flute
1983	Nielsen	Maskarade
1983	Verdi	Un giorno di regno
1984	Smetana	The Two Widows
1984	Mozart	Don Giovanni
1985	Offenbach	Bluebeard
1985	Verdi	La traviata
1986	Weber	Der Freischütz
1986	Mozart	Così fan tutte
1987	Moore	The Ballad of Baby Doe
1987	Donizetti	The Elixir of Love
1988	Vaughan Williams	Sir John in Love
1988	Mozart	The Abduction from the Seraglio
1989	Smetana	The Secret (Note: US premiere)
1989	Rossini	La Cenerentola
1990	Offenbach	La belle Hélène
1990	Mozart	The Marriage of Figaro
1991	Donizetti	Don Pasquale
1991	Gilbert & Sullivan	Trial by Jury
1991	Moore	The Devil and Daniel Webster
1992	Floyd	Susannah
1992	Rossini	The Barber of Seville
1993	Mozart	Così fan tutte
1993	Smetana	The Bartered Bride
1994	Mozart	The Magic Flute
1994	Verdi	Un giorno di regno
1995	Copland	The Tender Land
1995	Gilbert & Sullivan	The Yeomen of the Guard
1996	Mechem	Tartuffe (Note: New York staged premiere)
1996	Donizetti	The Elixir of Love
1997	Menotti	The Medium
1997	Mozart	Don Giovanni
1997	Schubert	The Conspirators
1998	J. Strauss	Die Fledermaus
1998	Vaughan Williams	Hugh the Drover
1999	Mozart	The Abduction from the Seraglio
1999	Nielsen	Maskarade
2000	Blitzstein	Regina
2000	Donizetti	Don Pasquale
2001	Rossini	The Barber of Seville
2001	Weber	Der Freischütz
2002	Mozart	The Marriage of Figaro
2002	Suppé	Boccaccio
2003	Lehár	The Merry Widow
2003	Smetana	The Bartered Bride
2004	Rossini	L'equivoco stravagante
2004	Verdi	La traviata
2005	Menotti	The Consul
2005	Puccini	La bohème
2006	Chabrier	An Incomplete Education
2006	Mozart	Così fan tutte
2006	Purcell	Dido and Aeneas
2007	Bizet	Carmen
2007	Copland	The Tender Land
2008	Leoncavallo	Pagliacci
2008	Mozart	The Impresario
2008	Offenbach	Orpheus in the Underworld
2009	Mozart	The Magic Flute
2009	Smetana	The Two Widows
2010	Donizetti	Don Pasquale
2010	Mahler/Weber	Die drei Pintos
2011	Auber	Fra Diavolo
2011	Mozart	Don Giovanni
2012	Humperdinck	Hansel and Gretel
2012	Vaughan Williams	The Poisoned Kiss
2013	Puccini	La bohème
2013	Rossini	La gazza ladra
2014	Mechem	The Rivals
2014	Verdi	La traviata
2015	Britten	Albert Herring
2015	Mozart	The Marriage of Figaro
2016	Blitzstein	Regina
2016	Rossini	La Cenerentola
2017	Vaughan Williams	Sir John in Love
2017	Verdi	Falstaff
2018	Mozart	The Abduction from the Seraglio
2018	Weber	Der Freischütz
2019	Menotti	The Consul
2019	Gilbert & Sullivan	The Mikado
2020	Mozart	Don Giovanni
2021	Mozart	The Impresario (film)
2022	Gilbert & Sullivan	Trial by Jury (film)
2022	Mozart	La clemenza di Tito
2023	Poulenc	Dialogues of the Carmelites
2023	Weill/Gershwin/Hart	Lady in the Dark
2024	Gilbert & Sullivan	Iolanthe
2024	Puccini	Gianni Schicchi
2024	Rossini	Il signor Bruschino
2025	Humperdinck	Hansel and Gretel
2025	Mozart	Così fan tutte
