= 865 Zubaida =

Stony background asteroid

Discovery
- Discovered by: M. F. Wolf
- Discovery site: Heidelberg Obs.
- Discovery date: 15 February 1917

Designations
- Pronunciation: /zuːˈbaɪdə/
- Named after: Zobeide, a character in the opera Abu Hassan (Carl Maria von Weber)
- Alternative designations: A917 CH · 1936 FK_{1} 1970 GQ_{1} · A908 WF; 1917 BO · 1908 WF
- Minor planet category: main-belt · (inner) background

Orbital characteristics
- Epoch 31 May 2020 (JD 2459000.5)
- Uncertainty parameter 0
- Observation arc: 110.89 yr (40,502 d)
- Aphelion: 2.8874 AU
- Perihelion: 1.9487 AU
- Semi-major axis: 2.4181 AU
- Eccentricity: 0.1941
- Orbital period (sidereal): 3.76 yr (1,373 d)
- Mean anomaly: 191.81°
- Mean motion: 0° 15^{m} 43.56^{s} / day
- Inclination: 13.344°
- Longitude of ascending node: 176.92°
- Argument of perihelion: 302.04°

Physical characteristics
- Mean diameter: 16.774±3.186 km; 16.81±0.21 km; 17.77±1.1 km
- Synodic rotation period: 11.3533±0.0061 h
- Geometric albedo: 0.0972±0.014; 0.110±0.003; 0.128±0.074
- Spectral type: L (SDSS-MOC); S (SDSS-MFB) (Note: Search for Unusual Spectroscopic Candidates Among 40313 minor planets from the 3rd Release of the Sloan Digital Sky Survey Moving Object Catalog (publication). SDSS-MFB (Masi Foglia Binzel) taxonomy (catalog).)
- Absolute magnitude (H): 11.7

865 Zubaida /zuːˈbaɪdə/ is an elongated, stony background asteroid from the inner regions of the asteroid belt. It was discovered on 15 February 1917, by astronomer Max Wolf at the Heidelberg Observatory in southwest Germany, and given the provisional designations A917 CH and 1917 BO. The uncommon L-type asteroid has a rotation period of 11.4 hours and measures approximately 17 kilometers (11 miles) in diameter. It was named after Zobeide, a character in the opera Abu Hassan by Carl Maria von Weber (1786–1826).

== Orbit and classification ==
Zubaida is a non-family asteroid of the main belt's background population when applying the hierarchical clustering method to its proper orbital elements. It orbits the Sun in the inner asteroid belt at a distance of 1.9–2.9 AU once every 3 years and 9 months (1,373 days; semi-major axis of 2.42 AU). Its orbit has an eccentricity of 0.19 and an inclination of 13° with respect to the ecliptic. The body's observation arc begins with its first observation as A908 WF at Heidelberg Observatory on 29 November 1908, more than 8 years prior to its official discovery observation.

== Naming ==
This minor planet was named after the character Zobeide, the Caliph's wife in the opera Abu Hassan by German composer Carl Maria von Weber (1786–1826). The official naming was also mentioned in The Names of the Minor Planets by Paul Herget in 1955 (H 85). Another asteroid, 866 Fatme, was also named after one of the characters of this opera. The composer himself was honored with the naming of 4152 Weber.

== Physical characteristics ==
In the SDSS-based taxonomy (MOC), Zubaida is an uncommon L-type asteroid, while in the Masi Foglia Binzel (MFB) taxonomic variant, it is a common, stony S-type asteroid.

=== Rotation period ===
In January 2007, a rotational lightcurve of Zubaida was obtained from photometric observations by Colin Bembrick at the Mount Tarana Observatory (431) and Greg Crawford at Bagnall Beach Observatory (431) in collaboration with two other Australian observers. Lightcurve analysis gave a well-defined rotation period of 11.3533±0.0061 hours with a brightness variation of 0.38±0.02 magnitude (U=3). The observers also estimate an axial ratio (a/b) of 1.42 for the asteroid. An alternative observation during January 2007, by David Higgins and Julian Oey at Hunters Hill (E14) and Leura (E17) observatories, respectively, gave a concurring period 11.363±0.004 hours with an amplitude of 0.38±0.03 magnitude (U=3–).

=== Diameter and albedo ===
According to the surveys carried out by the NEOWISE mission of NASA's Wide-field Infrared Survey Explorer (WISE), the Japanese Akari satellite, and the Infrared Astronomical Satellite IRAS, Zubaida measures (16.774±3.186), (16.81±0.21) and (17.77±1.1) kilometers in diameter and its surface has an albedo of (0.128±0.074), (0.110±0.003) and (0.0972±0.014), respectively. The WISE team also published an alternative mean diameter of (15.80±3.43 km) with a corresponding albedo of (0.16±0.09). The Collaborative Asteroid Lightcurve Link assumes a standard albedo for a stony asteroid of 0.20 and calculates a diameter of 13.58 kilometers based on an absolute magnitude of 11.7.
