= Abu al-Hasan =

- Gender: Male

Origin
- Origin: Arabic
- Meaning: Father of Hasan
- Region of origin: Muslim world

Other names
- Related names: Umm al-Hasan (feminine)

Abu al-Hasan (Arabic: أبو الحسن, romanized: Abū l-Ḥasan, lit. 'Father of Hasan'), also transliterated Abu'l-Hasan, is an Arabic kunya ('teknonym'). It may refer to:

== Notable people ==
=== Politics and military ===
- Ali (600–661), the fourth caliph of the Rashidun Caliphate
- Ali al-Rida (766–818), the eighth Imam in Twelver doctrine
- Abulasan, 12th-century Georgian politician
- Abu al-Hasan Ali ibn Othman (1297–1351), a Marinid-dynasty sultan of Morocco and Al-Andalus
- Abu'l-Hasan Ali of Granada (died 1485)
- Abul Hassan (born 1917), Indian politician and trade unionist
- Abul Hasan (politician), Bangladeshi politician
- Abul Hasan Jashori (1918–1993), Bangladeshi Islamic scholar, politician and freedom fighter
- Abul-Hasan al-Muhajir, Islamic spokesman
- Abolhassan Banisadr (1933 – 2021), first president of Iran after the Iranian Revolution
- Abul Hasan Chowdhury (born 1951), former Bangladeshi State Minister of Foreign Affairs
- A. A. M. S. Arefin Siddique (1953-2025), Bangladeshi academic administrator

=== Arts and Literature ===
- Abul Hasan (poet) (1947–1975), Bangladeshi poet
- Abu'l-Hasan (artist) (1589 – c. 1630), a Mughal-era painter
- Abulhasan Alekperzadeh or Abulhasan (1906–1986), Azerbaijani writer
- Abou Hassan (story), one of the Arabian Nights
  - Abu Hassan, an 1811 opera by Carl Maria von Weber
  - Abu Hassan Penchuri (English: Abu Hassan The Thief), a 1955 Singaporean Malay-language romantic fantasy film

=== Sports ===
- Abul Hasan (cricketer) (born 1992), Bangladeshi cricketer

=== Other ===
- Codename of Ali Hassan Salameh (1941-1979), Palestinian militant
