= Silvana (opera) =

- Opera by Carl Maria von Weber
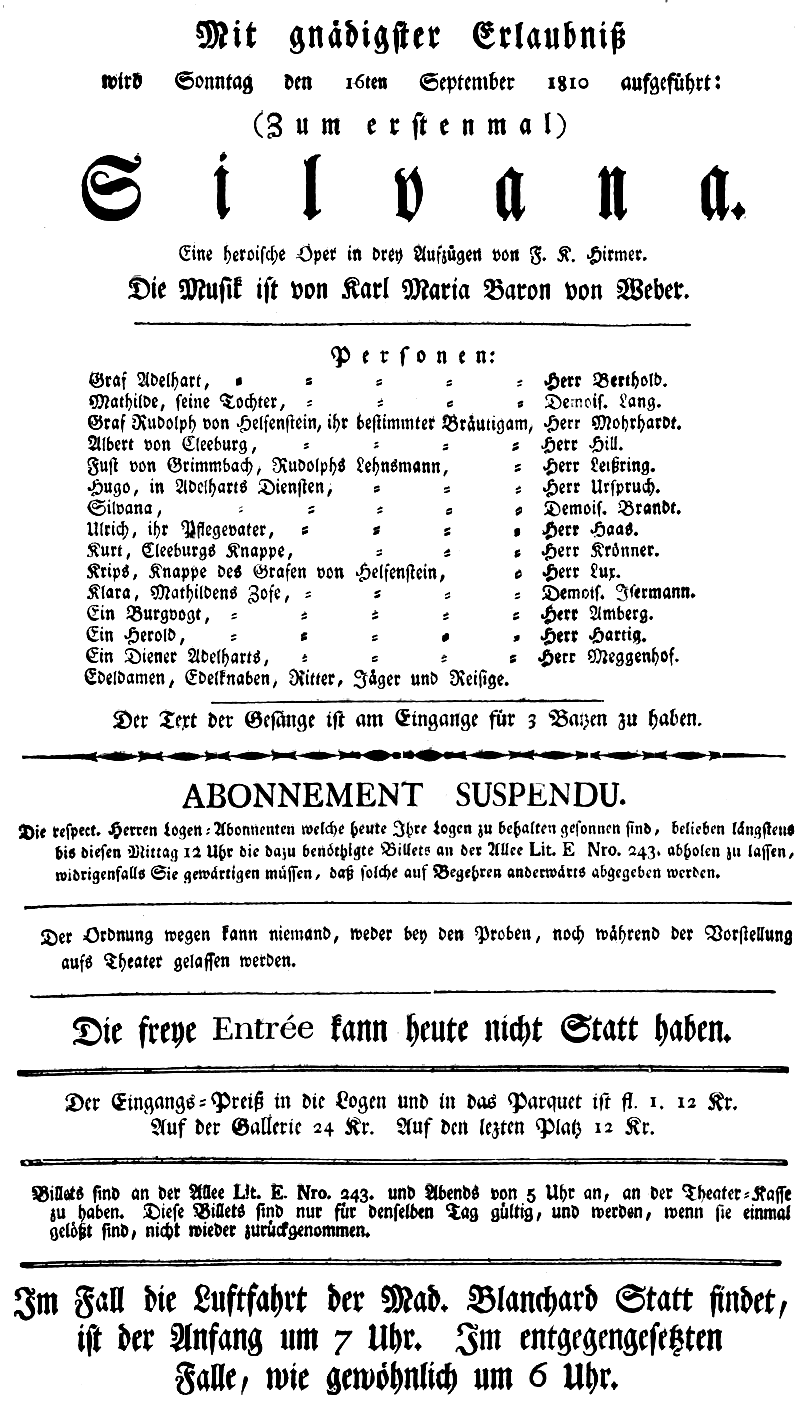
- Playbill of the premiere
- Librettist: Franz Carl Hiemer
- Language: German
- Premiere: 16 September 1810; Nationaltheater Frankfurt

Silvana (J. 87) is an opera by Carl Maria von Weber, first performed at the Nationaltheater Frankfurt on 16 September 1810. The libretto, by Franz Carl Hiemer, is a reworking of an earlier, unsuccessful opera by Weber, Das Waldmädchen. Weber also reused music from the same piece in Silvana. It has been characterized as a somewhat unstable combination of emerging individualism with conventional techniques; however, the premiere was moderately successful, and the Berlin premiere was met with an enthusiastic reception. It is the earliest Weber opera to have survived in its complete form; older operatic works are either fragmentary or entirely lost.

Weber used a melody from a discarded aria for the opera to compose the popular Seven Variations on a Theme from Silvana for clarinet and piano. He used the same melody for the theme-and-variations first movement of his Sonata No. 5 in A major (from the Six sonates progressives for piano and violin obbligato, J 99-104).

== Roles ==
Role	Voice type	Premiere cast, 16 Sept 1810 Conductor: Carl Maria von Weber
Silvana	Mime and spoken	Caroline Brandt
Mechthilde, daughter of Adelhart	soprano	Margarethe Lang
Klärchen, maid of Mechthilde	soprano	Isermann
Count Rudolf von Helenstein	tenor	Mohrhardt
Albert von Cleeburg	tenor	Hill
Count Adelhart	baritone	Berthold
Krips, squire of Helenstein	bass	Lux
Fust von Grimmbach	baritone	Leissring
Kurt, squire of Cleeburg	bass	Krönner
A herald	spoken	
Chorus

== Synopsis ==
=== Act 1 ===
The opera opens to horns and a huntsmen's chorus as Count Rudolph von Helfenstein and his followers are enjoying a bear hunt. Krips, Rudolf's squire, offers some comic relief as he stumbles on the scene and thinks he has killed the dead bear singing the first of his several comic songs. This is followed by another huntsmen's chorus which would not be out of place in Der Freischütz. Count Rudolph now sings an melancholy aria about seeking solitude in the wilderness and seeking the love of a woman. Count Adelhart's daughter, Mechthilde, is promised to him, but he knows she does not love him. The aria concludes with the idea that he will seek the trumpets of battle to find rest from his lack of love. Musically the aria is similar to that of Huon's in Oberon. Krips tries to cheer him up with another comic aria, where Krips advocates a fear of the supernatural and Rudolf proposes courage at all times. Krips thinks he has seen a wood-spirit or devil in a cave nearby. As Krips hides, his aria describes his feelings and the action as Rudolf goes into the cave and then leads a girl, Silvana, out. She is mute and dressed only in skins and leaves. Rudolf falls in love with her. Rudolf sings to Silvana and she shyly reciprocates his advances, the orchestra acting very cleverly as the partner to her mute duet with Rudolf. She does not wish to leave the cave and her forest home. The huntsmen return and sing of the joys brought by the Rhine and the wine it produces. Silvana falls asleep and Rudolf has his men quietly carry her to Count Adelhart's castle nearby where he is staying as a guest.

=== Act 2 ===
In the opening duet Count Adelhart is quarreling with his daughter about the arranged marriage with Count Rudolf that he demands of her. Count Adelhart believes that Hanns von Cleeburg robbed him of his second daughter Ottilie, and Mechthilde as the only surviving child of the family and must make a suitable marriage. After he leaves Mechthilde sings an aria about her love for Albert von Cleeburg, son of her father's enemy. Her maid Klärchen manages to arrange a secret meeting between the couple, she plans on going along since she is loved by Albert's squire, Kurt. In a quartet the four lovers express their common desire for happiness together. Albert hopes that Count Rudolf will be a noble-hearted man and stand aside for true love.

After an orchestral interlude the scene opens as Silvana awakens in the castle to Rudolf's pleas for her to stay with someone who loves her. He learns that she has left her father behind and he sends Krips to ask Sir Fust to seek him out, and bring him to the castle. In another aria he sings again about how much he loves her. This is followed by another comic aria where Krips extolls the virtues of wine over women.

The final to the act takes place in the grand ceremonial hall after a tournament has taken place. An unknown knight has won all three contests and is awarded prizes of a sword and golden spurs by the lovely Mechthilde. Count Adelhart and the other beg him to raise his visor to reveal the noble knight. When they see he is Albert von Cleeburg, Count Adelhart is enraged and seeks revenge. Only Rudolf's sword prevents Albert's imprisonment and allows him to escape as the act ends.

=== Act 3 ===
Albert and his followers have gathered in the forest, where there is a terrific thunder storm. It is here that they come upon Ulrich, once in Count Adelhart's service. He is in despair, seeking for his foster daughter Silvana whom he had found in the forest, suckled by wolves. Silvana is in fact Adelhart‘s lost daughter Ottilie, driven out and exposed in the forest by her jealous father. Her mother had died young and Count Adelhart suspected that she was in love with Count von Cleeburg and that because of a slight resemblance, she was his daughter. He drove her out of the castle and Ulrich became her foster father, hoping for an eventual reconciliation.

Meanwhile, Count Adelhart plots revenge on both sets of lovers. Rudolph only has eyes for the mute Silvana, but if she died maybe he would marry his daughter. Adelhart's plan to murder Silvana is prevented at the last moment by Rudolph and Mechthilde. Albert appears and brings the happy news: Silvana is Ottilie, Adelhart's daughter and sister of Mechthilde. A diamond cross that once belonged to Ottilie's mother and her birthmark convince the angry Count Adelhart. Ulrich frees the girl from his command of silence. Adelhart now gives his daughters permission to marry: Ottilie/Silvana, will be united with Rudolph, Mechthilde with Albert, The old family feud is at an end and celebration is sung by a final chorus followed by three orchestral numbers: a torch dance, a dance of the Pages and a quick dance, then a choral finale that ends the opera.

== Recordings ==
- Complete recording of the opera, conducted by Gerhard Markson, on the Marco Polo label. (Markson has also recorded, for the same label, the only complete recording of Weber's first complete opera, Peter Schmoll.)
- The Overture is unique among Weber's operas in that it does not draw on tunes from the opera. It is the least performed of his opera overtures but is a fine work nonetheless, and Neeme Järvi has made a recording of it in his collection of Weber overtures, on the Chandos label.

== Sources ==
- Bandur, Markus (Ed.), Silvana. Romantic Opera in three Acts. Text by Franz Carl Hiemer (with Supplements by F. G. Toll) (WeV C.5) (= Carl Maria von Weber Complete Works, Series III, Vol. 3a, 3b, 3c), Mainz: Schott, 2011. [3 vol.] ISBN 978-3-7957-9344-9, ISBN 978-3-7957-9447-7, ISBN 978-3-7957-9448-4
- Brown, Clive (2002a) [1992]. "Weber, Carl Maria (Friedrich Ernst) von". Grove Music Online. Oxford, England: Oxford University Press. doi:10.1093/gmo/9781561592630.article.O004022. ISBN 978-1-56159-263-0. (subscription, Wikipedia Library access or UK public library membership required)
- Brown, Clive (2002b) [1992]. "Silvana". Grove Music Online. Oxford, England: Oxford University Press. doi:10.1093/gmo/9781561592630.article.O010005. ISBN 978-1-56159-263-0. (subscription, Wikipedia Library access or UK public library membership required)
- Holden, Amanda, (Ed.), The New Penguin Opera Guide, New York: Penguin Putnam, Inc., 2001 ISBN 0-14-029312-4
- Warrack, John (1976). Carl Maria Von Weber. Cambridge, England: Cambridge University Press. ISBN 978-0521291217.
