= 866 Fatme =

Background asteroid

Discovery
- Discovered by: M. F. Wolf
- Discovery site: Heidelberg Obs.
- Discovery date: 25 February 1917

Designations
- Named after: Fatme, a character in the opera Abu Hassan (Carl Maria von Weber)
- Alternative designations: A917 DG · 1950 DF_{1} 1917 BQ
- Minor planet category: main-belt · (outer) background

Orbital characteristics
- Epoch 31 May 2020 (JD 2459000.5)
- Uncertainty parameter 0
- Observation arc: 102.93 yr (37,596 d)
- Aphelion: 3.2871 AU
- Perihelion: 2.9606 AU
- Semi-major axis: 3.1238 AU
- Eccentricity: 0.0523
- Orbital period (sidereal): 5.52 yr (2,017 d)
- Mean anomaly: 34.544°
- Mean motion: 0° 10^{m} 42.6^{s} / day
- Inclination: 8.6616°
- Longitude of ascending node: 91.060°
- Argument of perihelion: 263.20°

Physical characteristics
- Mean diameter: 78.061±0.360 km; 86.49±1.16 km; 88.31±2.0 km
- Synodic rotation period: 5.800±0.002 h
- Geometric albedo: 0.038±0.001; 0.046±0.007; 0.0473±0.002
- Spectral type: SMASS = X
- Absolute magnitude (H): 9.50

866 Fatme (prov. designation: A917 DG or 1917 BQ) is a large background asteroid, approximately 86 kilometers (53 miles) in diameter, located in the outer region of the asteroid belt. It was discovered by German astronomer Max Wolf at the Heidelberg-Königstuhl State Observatory on 25 February 1917. The X-type asteroid has a short rotation period of 5.8 hours. It was named after "Fatme", a character in the opera Abu Hassan by Carl Maria von Weber (1786–1826).

== Orbit and classification ==
Fatme is a non-family asteroid of the main belt's background population when applying the hierarchical clustering method to its proper orbital elements. It orbits the Sun in the outer asteroid belt at a distance of 3.0–3.3 AU once every 5 years and 6 months (2,017 days; semi-major axis of 3.12 AU). Its orbit has an eccentricity of 0.05 and an inclination of 9° with respect to the ecliptic. The body's observation arc begins at Heidelberg Observatory on 16 March 1917, or three weeks after its official discovery observation.

== Naming ==
This minor planet was named after Fatme, a character in the opera Abu Hassan by German composer Carl Maria von Weber (1786–1826). The official naming was also mentioned in The Names of the Minor Planets by Paul Herget in 1955 (H 85). Another asteroid 865 Zubaida, was also named after a character of this opera. The composer himself was honored with the naming of 4152 Weber.

== Physical characteristics ==
In the Bus–Binzel SMASS classification, Fatme is an X-type asteroid.

=== Rotation period ===
In June 2018, a rotational lightcurve of Fatme was obtained from 5 nights of photometric observations by Tom Polakis at the Command Module Observatory (V02) in Arizona. Lightcurve analysis gave a rotation period of 5.800±0.002 hours with a brightness variation of 0.21±0.02 magnitude (U=2). The result supersedes previously reported period determinations of 20.03±0.01 hours with an amplitude of 0.21±0.05 magnitude by Robert Stephens at the Santana Observatory (646), California, in May 2001 (U=2), 9.4±0.2 hours with an amplitude of 0.06±0.01 magnitude (tentative) by French amateur astronomer Laurent Bernasconi in December 2004 (U=1), 9.36±0.05 hours with an amplitude of 0.06±0.01 magnitude (tentative) by French amateur astronomer René Roy in May 2012 (U=2−), and 20.7±0.1 hours with an amplitude of 0.12±0.02 magnitude by the Spanish group of asteroid observers, OBAS, in January 2016 (U=2−).

=== Diameter and albedo ===
According to the surveys carried out by the NEOWISE mission of NASA's Wide-field Infrared Survey Explorer (WISE), the Japanese Akari satellite, and the Infrared Astronomical Satellite IRAS, Fatme measures (78.061±0.360), (86.49±1.16) and (88.31±2.0) kilometers in diameter and its surface has an albedo of (0.046±0.007), (0.038±0.001) and (0.0473±0.002), respectively. The Collaborative Asteroid Lightcurve Link derives an albedo of 0.0361 and a diameter of 88.11 kilometers based on an absolute magnitude of 9.5. Alternative mean-diameter measurements published by the WISE team include (82.388±1.055 km), (88.25±26.33 km) and (95.83±37.32 km) with corresponding albedos of (0.0412±0.0096), (0.04±0.03) and (0.03±0.02).
