= Andrzej Dobber =

Polish opera baritone

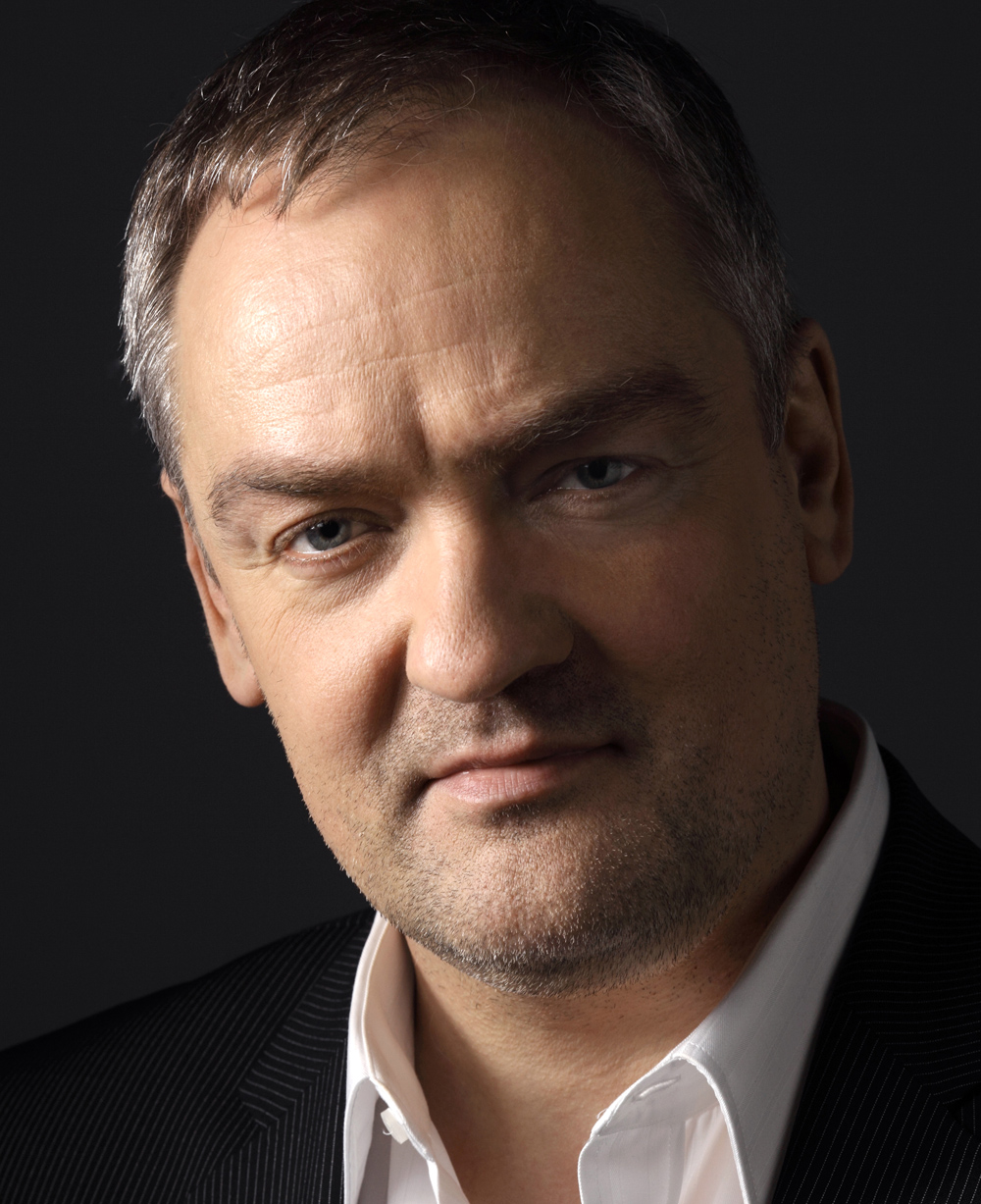

Background information
- Born: Andrzej Dobber; 28 May 1961 (age 64)
- Origin: Więcbork, Poland
- Genres: Opera
- Occupation: singer (baritone)
- Years active: 1985 - present
- Website: www.andrzejdobber.com

Andrzej Dobber (born 28 May 1961 in Więcbork) is a Polish baritone, honored with the title of Kammersänger by the Senate of the City of Hamburg and awarded the silver medal for Merit to Culture - Gloria Artis by the Polish Minister of Culture.

== Education, participation in vocal competitions ==
A graduate of Academy of Music in Kraków in the piano and organ faculty as well as vocal faculty in the class of Helena Łazarska. Initially, his voice was conducted as a bass and as a bass he won awards at vocal competitions in Poland: the Kiejstut Bacewicz International Chamber Music Competition (1st Prize, 1983) and the Ada Sari International Vocal Artistry Competition (2nd Prize, 1985).

The artist has also won numerous awards at international vocal competitions, just to name a few: Antonín Dvořák International Vocal Competition in Karlovy Vary (2nd Prize, 1983), Neue Stimmen in Gütersloh (3rd Prize, 1987), the International Hans Gabor Belvedere Singing Competition in Vienna (where he received three awards, including the Journalists' and Audience Award, 1989) and the ARD International Music Competition in Munich (1st Prize, 1990).

== Artistic career ==
Andrzej Dobber made his opera debut in 1986 as Gremin in P. Tchaikovsky's Eugene Onegin at the Krakow Opera.

After receiving a scholarship from the Meistersinger Conservatory in Nürnberg, he was engaged at the Staatstheater Nürnberg, where he performed the Italian and German repertoire. At the suggestion of the then music director Christian Thielemann, he transformed his voice into a baritone. His first baritone part performed on stage was Tonio in R. Leoncavallo's Pagliacci. After winning the ARD competition, he signed a contract with the Oper Frankfurt, where in the years 1991-1994 he appeared as Escamilio in G. Bizet's Carmen, Figaro in G. Rossini's Il barbiere di Siviglia, Demetrius in B. Britten's A Midsummer Night's Dream and in the title part in P. Tchaikovsky's Eugene Onegin.

In the 1990s he was regularly invited to the Oper Köln and the Komische Oper Berlin. He performed at the Bayerische Staatsoper, the Oper Leipzig, the Semperoper Dresden, and began to perform outside of Germany (Montpellier, Vienna, Amsterdam, Brussels, Toulouse, Málaga). He appeared as, among others: Tonio, Alfio in P. Mascagni's Cavalleria rusticana, Enrico in G. Donizetti's Lucia di Lammermoor, Count Danilo in F. Lehár's Die lustige Witwe and in W. A. Mozart's operas - the title part in Don Giovanni as well as Count Almaviva and Figaro in Le nozze di Figaro. In 1995 he also made his debut as Escamillo in G. Bizet's Carmen at the Polish National Opera.

In the 1999/2000 season Andrzej Dobber performed for the first time with La Scala in Milan during a tour with Verdi's works in Japan. On this occasion he has sung Count Monterone in Rigoletto. The following season 2000/2001 he was invited to Milan to celebrate the centenary of G. Verdi's death, during which he appeared as Count Luna in the new production of Il trovatore under the baton of Riccardo Muti. His subsequent performances with Milan's La Scala were concerts under the baton of Daniel Barenboim - Symphony No. 9 by L. van Beethoven and Aida by G. Verdi for the 100th anniversary of Teatro Colón in Buenos Aires and the 60th anniversary of the artistic work of Daniel Barenboim in 2010.

In 2001 he performed for the first time at the Maggio Musicale Fiorentino as Count Luna in Il trovatore under the baton of Zubin Mehta. Then in Florence, also with Zubin Mehta, he sang such roles as Attilla, Scarpia, Macbeth - in the latter he also appeared at the Glyndebourne Festival (2007, 2011) and at the Royal Albert Hall with the London Philharmonic Orchestra under Daniel Barenboim (2007).

In the 2007/2008 season Andrzej Dobber made his debut as Amonasro in Aida at the New York Metropolitan Opera and at the Avery Fisher Hall during Richard-Tucker-Gala (among others with Renee Fleming and Maria Gulegina). The next seasons brought debuts: at London's Covent Garden (Giorgio Germont in La traviata with Anna Netrebko and Jonas Kaufmann), at the Opéra Bastille (Miller in Luisa Miller) and at the Palau de les Arts Reina Sofia under the baton of Lorin Maazel (Miller). He also appeared in performances of Un ballo in maschera as Renato at De Nationale Opera in Amsterdam, in title parts in Macbeth at the Staatsoper Hamburg, King Roger at the Mariinsky Theatre in Saint Petersburg and at the Edinburgh Opera Company under the direction of Valery Gergiev, as well as in La traviata in Hamburg, at the Metropolitan Opera and at the Los Angeles Opera. He also performed at the Metropolitan Opera as Stankar in Stiffelio under the baton of Placido Domingo.

The most important parts performed by Andrzej Dobber include the title role in G. Verdi's Rigoletto, which he has sung in theaters in Dresden, Leipzig, Berlin, Munich, Hamburg, Düsseldorf, Paris, Valencia, Geneva, Zurich, Cincinnati, as well as in Warsaw, Kraków, Wrocław and Poznań and the 200th anniversary of regaining independence of the Republic of Chile in 2010 in the presence of President Sebastian Piñera. Another important role is the title part in Simon Boccanegra by G. Verdi which the artist presented for the first time in 1997 at the Polish National Opera, then at the Théâtre du Capitole de Toulouse under the direction of Marco Armiliato, in the years 2009–2011 at the Wiener Staatsoper and in 2010 at the La Scala in Milan and at the Staatsoper Unter den Linden in Berlin under the baton of Daniel Barenboim.

Baron Scarpia in G. Puccini's Tosca is also a very important role in the artist's oeuvre. He has sung it at the Teatro Comunale in Florence (2005), the Houston Grand Opera (2015), the Wiener Staatsoper (2018) and on many German stages, including theatres in Berlin and Dresden.

In 2011, he appeared at the opening of the Polish Presidency of the European Union in the title role in King Roger by Karol Szymanowski at the Théâtre Royal de la Monnaie in Brussels in the presence of, among others the President of the Republic of Poland, the President of the European Council, the head of the European Commission and the princely pair of Belgium.

In the 2012/2013 season Andrzej Dobber celebrated the 30th anniversary of his artistic work with concerts at the Kraków Philharmonic and the Warsaw National Philharmonic. He also recorded a solo album with the Warsaw National Philharmonic Orchestra conducted by Antoni Wit. The album entitled Andrzej Dobber. Arias. received the Fryderyk 2014 award in the category of classical music: Album of the Year - Choral, Oratorio and Opera Music.

In February 2015 at the request of the Staatsoper Hamburg, he received the title of Kammersänger, awarded to outstanding opera artists.

In 2017 at the Staatsoper Hamburg he sang the part of Barak in Die Frau ohne Schatten by R. Strauss.

In February 2018 he made his debut in the title part in Der fliegende Holländer by R. Wagner at the Semperoper in Dresden. He presented this role also at the Houston Grand Opera and at the Staatsoper Hamburg.

In the 2018/2019 season he sang Rigoletto at the Grand Theatre in Łódź and the Polish National Opera. He appeared as Scarpia at the Staatsoper Unter den Linden in Berlin and the Semperoper.

He has been a full-time soloist at the Silesian Opera in Bytom since January 2024, and has since then appeared as Nabucco and Scarpia. He is slated to appear as Amonasro, Nabucco, and Scarpia in the 2025/2026 season.

== Achievements and artistic activities ==
Andrzej Dobber's repertoire includes major Verdi parts, such as Nabucco, Falstaff, Rigoletto, Iago, Giorgio Germont, Count Luna, Marquis de Posa, Renato, Amonasro, Miller, Francesco Foscari and Simon Boccanegra, as well as Puccini parts: Scarpia, Jack Rance, Sharpless. The artist also sings roles in the works of Richard Wagner, such as: Amfortas, Wolfram, Kurnewal or the title part of the Dutchman, as well as Johanaan or Orestes in the works of Richard Strauss and the little role in Szymanowski's King Roger.

He regularly performs on stages of the most renown opera houses in the world: incl. the Metropolitan Opera, La Scala, the Covent Garden, the Wiener Staatsoper, the Opéra Bastille, the Théâtre Royal de la Monnaie, the Gran Teatre del Liceu, the Komische Oper Berlin, the Staatsoper Unter den Linden, the Deutsche Oper Berlin, the Bayerische Staatsoper, De Nationale Opera in Amsterdam, the Edinburgh Grand Opera, the Scottish Opera, the Opéra national de Montpellier, the Opéra National de Lyon, the Théâtre du Capitole de Toulouse, the Los Angeles Opera, the Houston Grand Opera, the Cincinnati Opera, the New National Theatre Tokyo, the Hong Kong Cultural Centre, the Vancouver Opera, the Mariinsky Theatre, the Semperoper Dresden, the Aalto Theatre, the Staatsoper Hamburg, the Oper Köln, the Oper Frankfurt, the Staatsoper Hannover, the Staatstheater Nürnberg, the Zurich Opera, the Grand Théâtre de Genève, the Teatro Comunale, Florence, the Arena di Verona and the Israeli Opera.

He took part in many opera festivals (including the Glyndebourne Festival, where he sang the part of Macbeth).

He performed under the baton of many outstanding conductors, such as: Roberto Abbado, Richard Armstrong, Daniel Barenboim, Gary Bertini, Semyon Bychkov, Sylvain Cambreling, Riccardo Chailly, Colin Davis, Vladimir Fedoseyev, Valery Gergiev, Yakov Kreizberg, Vladimir Jurowski, Kazushi Ono, Lorin Maazel, Zubin Mehta, Roger Norrington, Kirill Petrenko, Helmuth Rilling, Carlo Rizzi, Giuseppe Sinopoli, Stefan Soltesz, Simone Young, Christian Thielemann, Lawrence Foster, Pinchas Steinberg and Edo de Waart.

Andrzej Dobber also sings concert repertoire, including symphonic and oratorio works, as well as song cycles.

He performed with such orchestras as the NHK Symphony Orchestra, the Israel Philharmonic Orchestra, the Berliner Philharmoniker, the Wiener Symphoniker, the Royal Concertgebouw Orchestra, the Gewandhausorchester Leipzig, the Sächsische Staatskapelle Dresden, the Rundfunk-Sinfonieorchester Berlin as well as the Sinfonia Varsovia and the Warsaw National Philharmonic Orchestra.

He is a jury member of numerous vocal competitions in Poland, including the 4th Adam Didur Opera Singers' Competition in Bytom (2019), 1st Polish National Bogdan Paprocki Vocal Competition in Bydgoszcz (2019).

== Awards and prizes ==
- 2012:The Medal for Merit to Culture – Gloria Artis
- 2015: Kammersänger (at the request of the Staatsoper Hamburg)

== Discography ==
=== Opera ===
- Król Roger, Polskie Wydawnictwa Audiowizualne, 2013 (DVD)
- Tristan und Isolde, Vladimir Jurowski conducting the London Philharmonic Orchestra & Glyndebourne Chorus, with Torsten Kerl, Anja Kampe, Sarah Connolly, Glyndebourne, 2013
- Aida, conducted by Kazushi Ono, with Angela Brown, Roberto Alagna, Dolora Zajick, Vitalij Kowaljow, Reinhard Hagen, the Metropolitan Opera, Celestial Audio, 2007
- Luisa Miller, conducted by Massimo Zanetti, with Ana Maria Martinez, Ramón Vargas, Ildar Abdrazakov, María José Montiel, Kwangchul Youn, L'Opéra National de Paris, Premiere Opera Ltd., 2008
- Otello, conducted by Massimo Zanetti, with Stephen Gould, Anja Harteros, Woo-Kyung Kim, Semperoper Dresden 10/17/2006, Premiere Opera Ltd.
- Macbeth, Carlo Rizzi conducting Nederlands Philharmonisch Orkest, with Carol Vaness, Andrea Silvestrelli, Julian Gavin, Carlo Bosi, Premiere Opera Ltd., 2003
- Macbeth, Vladimir Jurowski conducting the London Philharmonic Orchestra, Glyndebourne, Celestial Audio, 2007
- Stiffelio, conducted by Placido Domingo, with José Cura, Sondra Radvanovsky, Michael Fabiano, the Metropolitan Opera 30/01/2010, Premiere Opera Ltd.
- La traviata, conducted by Paolo Carignani, with Marina Poplavskaya, Ismael Jordi, Diane Pilcher, De Nederlandse Opera, Celestial Audio, 2009
- Il trovatore, conducted by Riccardo Muti, with Salvatore Licitra, Barbara Frittoli, Violeta Urmana, Giorgio Giuseppini, Il Teatro alla Scala, House of Opera, 2001 (2 CD)

=== Recital ===
- Andrzej Dobber. Arias. Antoni Wit conducting the Warsaw Philharmonic Orchestra, dyr., DUX, 2013

=== Oratoria ===
- H. M. Górecki, Symphony No. 2 ’Copernican’ Beatus vir, Antoni Wit conducting the Polish National Radio Symphony Orchestra, Naxos, 2000

== Repertoire ==
=== Opera roles ===
- G. Bizet, Carmen, Escamillo
- W. Braunfels, Die Vögel, Wiedehopf
- A. Borodin, Prince Igor, Prince Igor
- G. Donizetti, Lucia di Lammermoor, Enrico
- P. Hindemith, Neues vom Tage, Eduard
- L. Janáček, Věc Makropulos, Jaroslav Prus
- R. Leoncavallo, Pagliacci, Tonio
- F. Lehár, Die lustige Witwe, Danilo Danilowitsch
- P. Mascagni, Cavalleria rusticana, Alfio
- W. A. Mozart, Don Giovanni, Don Giovanni
- W. A. Mozart, Die Zauberflöte, Papageno
- W. A. Mozart, La finta giardiniera, Nardo
- W. A. Mozart, Le nozze di Figaro, Count Almaviva
- M. Mussorgsky, Chowanschtschina, Schaklowity
- H. Pfitzner, Palestrina, Giovanni Morone
- G. Puccini, La bohème, Marcello
- G. Puccini, La fanciulla del West, Jack Race
- G. Puccini, Madama Butterfly, Sharpless
- G. Puccini, Manon Lescaut, Lescaut
- G. Puccini, Tosca, Scarpia
- N. Rimsky-Korsakov, The Legend of the Invisible City of Kitezh and the Maiden Fevroniya, Fyodor Poyarok
- N. Rimsky-Korsakov, The Tsar's Bride, Grigory Gryaznoy
- G. Rossini, Il barbiere di Siviglia, Figaro
- G. Rossini, La Cenerentola, Dandini
- R. Strauss, Ariadne auf Naxos, Musiklehrer
- R. Strauss, Capriccio, Graf
- R. Strauss, Die Frau ohne Schatten, Barak
- R. Strauss, Elektra, Orest
- R. Strauss, Salome, Jochanaan
- K. Szymanowski, King Roger, King Roger
- P. Tchaikovsky, Eugene Onegin, Eugene Onegin
- P. Tchaikovsky, The Queen of Spades, Count Tomsky
- G. Verdi, Aida, Amonasro
- G. Verdi, Attila, Ezio
- G. Verdi, Don Carlo, Rodrigo
- G. Verdi, Due Foscari, Francesco Foscari
- G. Verdi, Il trovatore, Count Luna
- G. Verdi, La forza del destino, Don Carlo de Vargas
- G. Verdi, La traviata, Giorgio Germont
- G. Verdi, Luisa Miller, Miller
- G. Verdi, Macbeth, Macbeth
- G. Verdi, Nabucco, Nabucco

== Bibliography ==
- Biography of Andrzej Dobber on Culture.pl
- Biography of Andrzej Dobber in: Archiwum Teatru Wielkiego - Opery Narodowej
- Andrzej Dobber in: Polish Theatre Encyclopedia
- Andrzej Dobber in: Historical Archive of La Scala
- Andrzej Dobber in: Archive of the Metropolitan Opera
- Andrzej Dobber w: Archive of the Glyndebourne Festival
