= Cuvilliés Theatre =

Opera house and theatre in Munich, Germany

Coordinates: 48°08′24″N 11°34′44″E

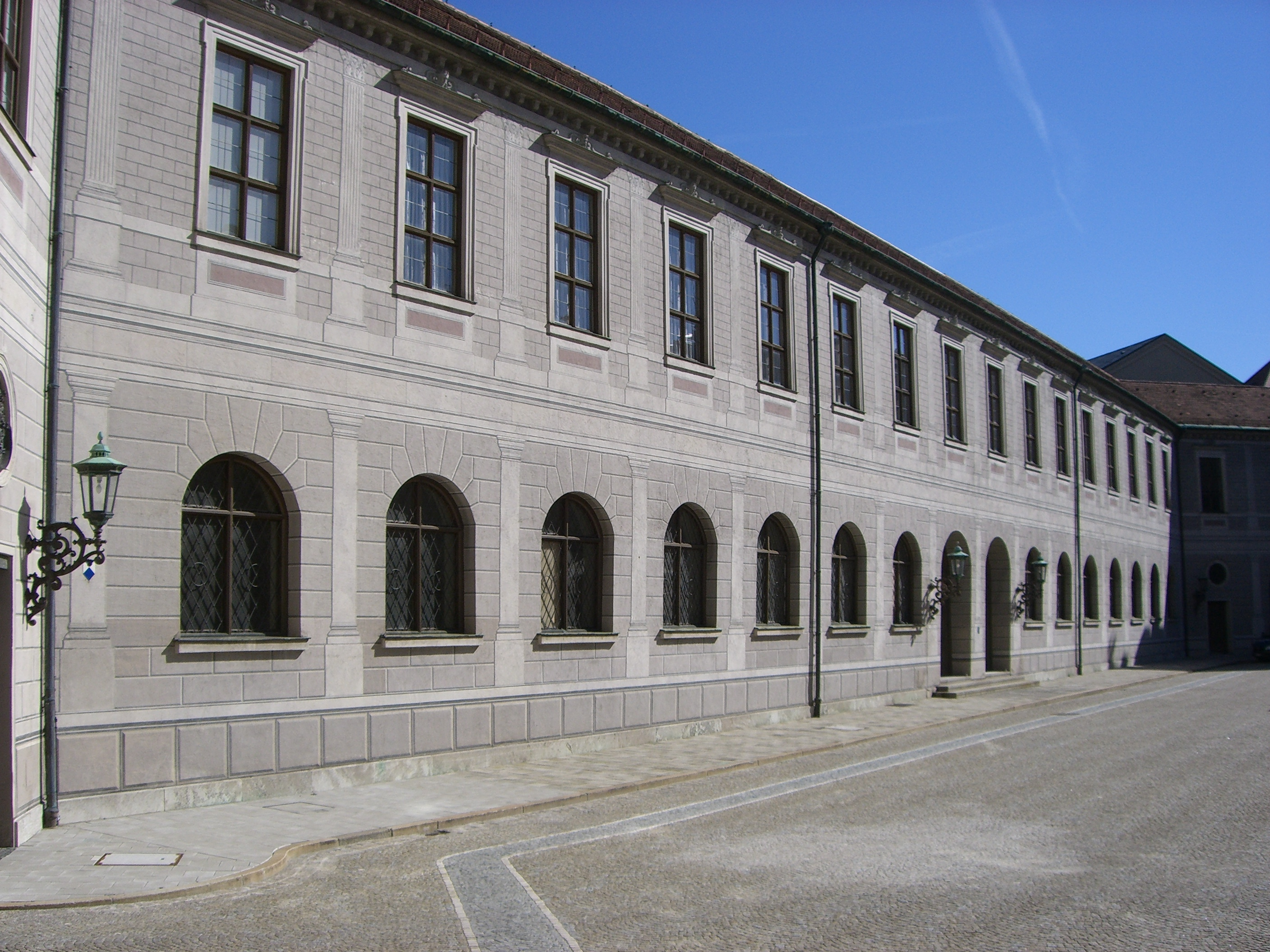
Facade of the Cuvilliés Theatre, 2007

The Cuvilliés Theatre (German: Cuvilliés-Theater) or Old Residence Theatre (Altes Residenztheater) is the former court theatre of the Residenz in Munich, Bavaria, Germany.

== History ==
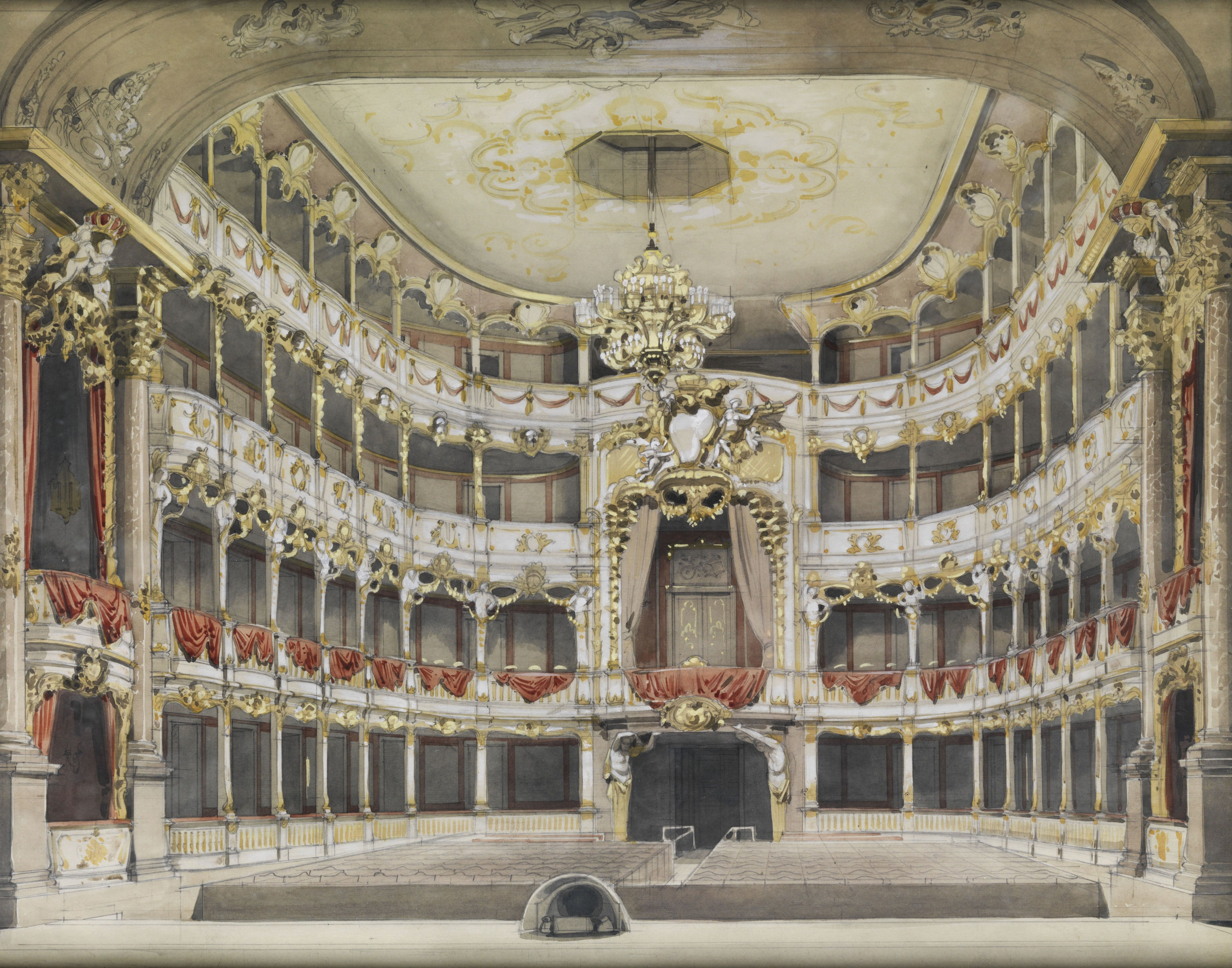
Residence Theatre interior, 19th century

Elector of Bavaria Maximilian III Joseph (reg. 1745–1777) commissioned the construction of a new theatre outside the palace after a fire in the St. George's Hall of the Residence which had served previously as a theatre room. The Residence Theatre was built from 1751 to 1753 by François de Cuvilliés in rococo style. The carving was done under supervision of Johann Baptist Straub.

Due to limited space the National Theatre Munich was built next to the Residence Theatre from 1811. The interior decoration was then removed under King Ludwig I (reg. 1825–1848) when the building became a depot for the National Theatre, but the Residence Theatre was already restored and re-opened in 1857 under King Maximilian II (reg. 1848–1864).

Originally the theatre was located where the present (New) Residence Theatre stands; after its destruction in World War II, the theatre was rebuilt in a wing of the Residence. Though the theatre was bombed during World War II, the carved and gilded boxes could be reused for they had been dismantled before and stored for security. Afterwards the Residenztheater was meticulously recreated in the 1950s and re-opened in 1958 under the name Cuvilliés Theatre with a performance of Mozart's The Marriage of Figaro. The theatre was again renovated and technically modernised from 2004 to 2008.

== Architecture ==
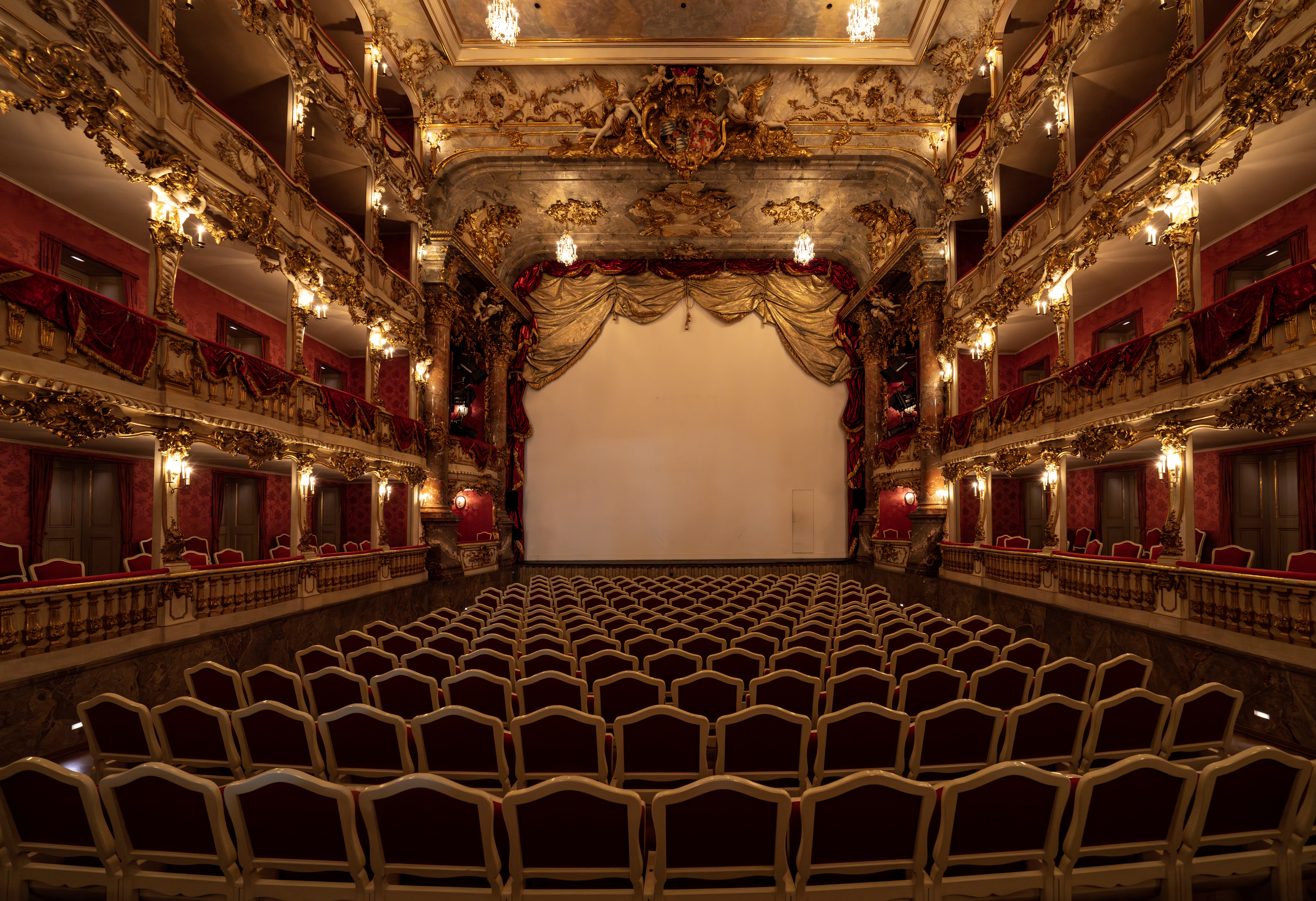
Interior of the Cuvilliés Theatre, 2009

The theatre space is decorated in red and gold. The four floors, each with 14 loges enclose the ground floor in the shape of a horseshoe.

Particularly noteworthy is the Electoral loge opposite the stage that extends from the second to third tier. It is supported by two figures of Atlas, which form the entrance. Above them are caryatids supporting the next level. Contemporary society division is reflected in the different features of different ranks: The Electoral loge is the artistic center of the room. The adjoining boxes in the first place, which was to be followed by the nobility, after and are richly decorated. This ornament is the second and third rank reduced gradually, where the gentry and the court officials took place. The relatively simply furnished ground floor was reserved for the urban aristocracy.

== Theatrical performances ==
The theatre was inaugurated on 12 October 1753 with Ferrandini's opera Catone in Utica. Under Charles Theodore, Elector of Bavaria, the court theatre opened for public performances by 1795. Many operas were staged there by the Bavarian court opera, including the premieres of Mozart's Idomeneo in 1781 and Weber's Abu Hassan in 1811. In 1831 Ferdinand Raimund gave a guest performance. Ernst von Possart staged several Mozart operas in original version during the 1890s. The Residence Theatre has been also a stage for plays. It saw the first performance of Ibsen's Hedda Gabler in 1891. On 14 June 2008, the Cuvilliés Theatre re-opened with the premiere performance of a new production of Mozart's Idomeneo, staged by Dieter Dorn, conducted by Kent Nagano.

== World premieres ==
- 2 October 1753, Catone in Utica by Giovanni Battista Ferrandini and Metastasio (Residence Theatre)
- 29 January 1781, Idomeneo by Wolfgang Amadeus Mozart and Giambattista Varesco (Residence Theatre)
- 1 February 1782, Semiramide by Antonio Salieri and Metastasio (Residence Theatre)
- 27 January 1807, Iphigenie in Aulis by Franz Danzi and Karl Reger (Residence Theatre)
- 4 June 1811, Abu Hassan by Carl Maria von Weber and Franz Carl Hiemer (Residence Theatre)
- 23 December 1812, Jephtas Gelübde by Giacomo Meyerbeer and Aloys Schreiber (Residence Theatre)
- 9 November 1817, Teolinde by Giacomo Meyerbeer (Residence Theatre)
- 28 June 2000, KANON für geschlossene Gesellschaft by Ruedi Häusermann (Cuvilliés Theatre)
- 27 June 2002, K-projekt 12/14 by Hans-Jürgen von Bose (after Franz Kafka's novella The Metamorphosis) (Cuvilliés Theatre)
- 17 July 2003, Das Gesicht im Spiegel by Jörg Widmann and Roland Schimmelpfennig (Cuvilliés Theatre)
