= Elizabeth Ferreira =

American politician

Member of the New Hampshire House of Representatives from the 28th Hillsborough district
- In office December 3, 2014 – December 4, 2018 Serving with Carl Siedel (2014–2018), Eric R. Eastman (2014–2016), Jan Schmidt (2016–2018)
- Preceded by: Sylvia E. Gale; Angeline A. Kopka; Jan Schmidt
- Succeeded by: Andy Schmidt; William Bordy; Bruce Cohen

Personal details
- Party: Republican

Elizabeth Ferreira is an American politician. She was a member of the New Hampshire House of Representatives and represented Hillsborough's 28th district.
