= Giovanni Battista Ferrandini =

Italian composer

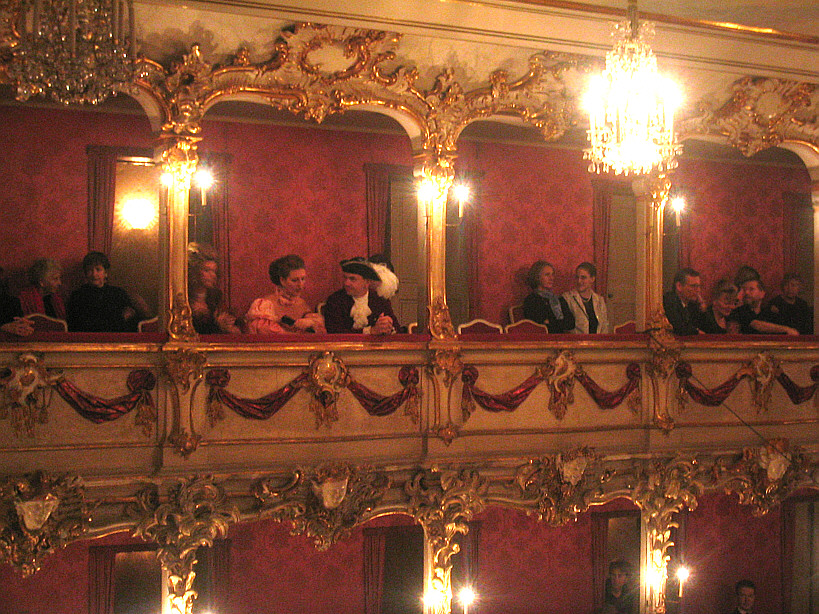
Interior of the Old Residenztheater, now Cuvilliés Theatre, which opened with Ferrandini's opera Catone in Utica in 1753

Giovanni Battista Ferrandini (c. 1710 – 25 October 1791), an Italian composer of the Baroque and Classical eras, was born in Venice, Italy and died in Munich, at the age of about 81.

He was a child prodigy and entered the service of Duke Ferdinand Maria Innocenz of Bavaria at the age of 12 as an oboist. The newly constructed Bavarian Court Theatre (the Old Residenztheater, now known as the Cuvilliés Theatre after the architect) in Munich opened on 12 October 1753 with Ferrandini's opera Catone in Utica. A recording of the opera made 250 years later in the same theatre is available (Oehms Classics OC 901).

In 1755, Ferrandini retired to Padua, where in 1771, Wolfgang Amadeus Mozart and his father Leopold Mozart visited him in retirement.

== Works, editions and recordings ==
Operas

- Giordo, 1727
- Il Sacrifico Invalido, 1729
- Adriano in Siria, 1737
- Catone in Utica, 1753
- Music for the coronation of Charles VII, Holy Roman Emperor in Frankfurt 1742

Cantatas

- Cantata Il pianto di Maria, 1739 (long misattributed to Handel as HWV 234: Il pianto di Maria or Giunta l'ora fatal) (Full recording.)
- Cantatas for Holy Week: O spettacolo pur troppo funesto. Ecco quel tronco (recordings: Elisabeth Scholl, Echo du Danube on Accent Records, 2005)
