= Peter Schmoll und seine Nachbarn =

Weber's 1st opera

- Opera by Carl Maria von Weber
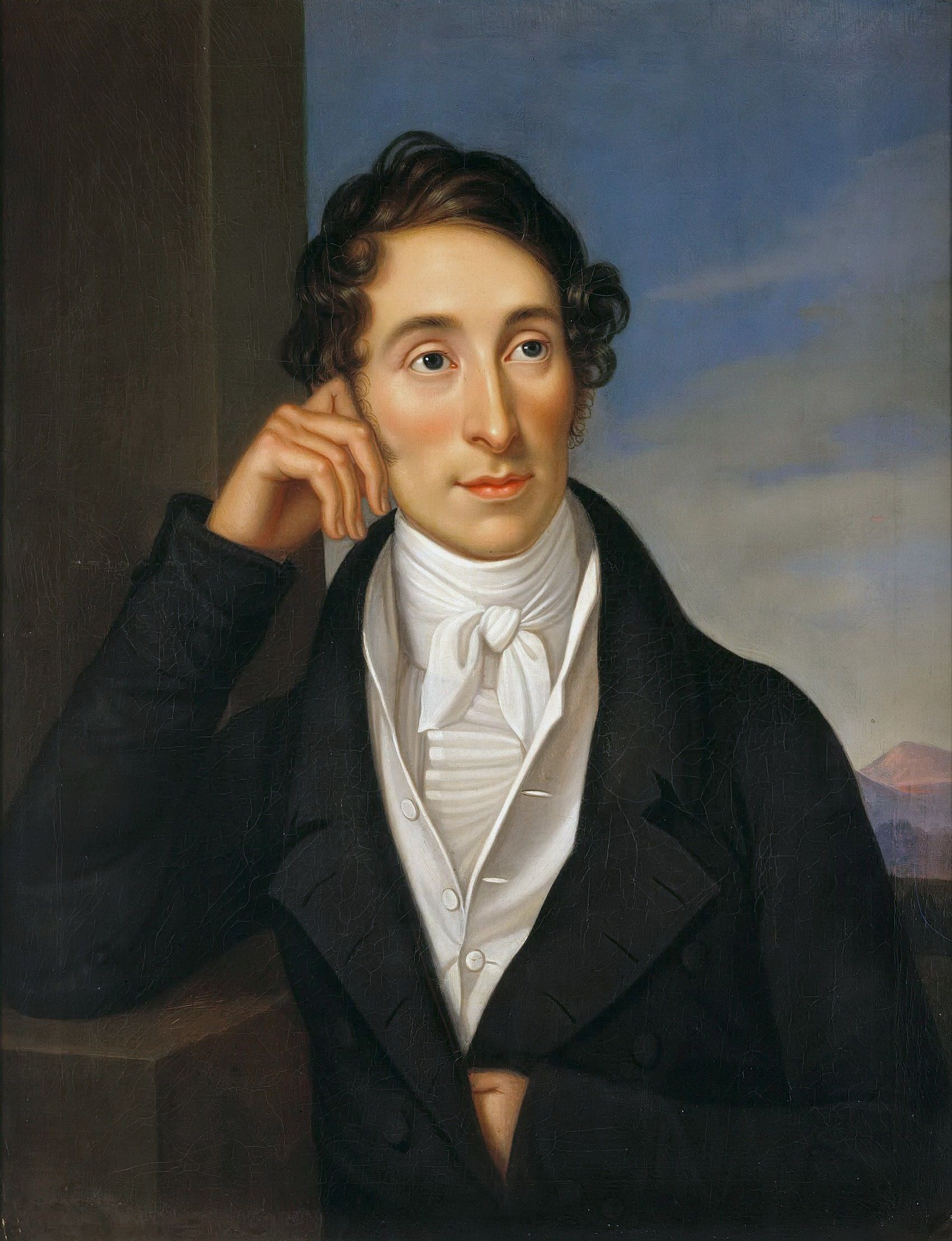
- Carl Maria von Weber, by Caroline Bardua, 1821
- Translation: Peter Schmoll and his Neighbours
- Librettist: Josef Türk
- Language: German
- Based on: Novel by Carl Gottlob Cramer
- Premiere: March? 1803; Augsburg

Peter Schmoll und seine Nachbarn (J. 8, Op. 8, Peter Schmoll and his Neighbours) is the third opera by Carl Maria von Weber and the first for which the music has survived, though the libretto has not. It was written in 1801–2 when the composer was only 15 and premiered in Augsburg the following year. The libretto is based on a novel by Carl Gottlob Cramer.

== Roles ==
- The cook (contralto)
- Hans Bast (bass)
- Karl Pirkner (tenor)
- Martin Schmoll (baritone)
- Minette (soprano)
- Niklas (tenor)
- Peter Schmoll (bass)

== Recording ==
- Peter Schmoll und seine Nachbarn Busching/Schmidt/Pfeffer, Hagen Philharmonic Orchestra, Gerhard Markson (Marco Polo, 1994)

== Sources ==
- Holden, Amanda, ed. The New Penguin Opera Guide, New York: Penguin Putnam, Inc., 2001 ISBN 0-14-029312-4
- Warrack, John, Review of the Markson recording, Gramophone, September 1994.
- Brown, Clive (2002) [1992]. "Weber, Carl Maria (Friedrich Ernst) von". Grove Music Online. Oxford, England: Oxford University Press. doi:10.1093/gmo/9781561592630.article.O004022. ISBN 978-1-56159-263-0. (subscription, Wikipedia Library access or UK public library membership required)
- Warrack, John (1976). Carl Maria Von Weber. Cambridge, England: Cambridge University Press. ISBN 978-0521291217.
