= Therese Emilie Henriette Winkel =

German artist, composer and author

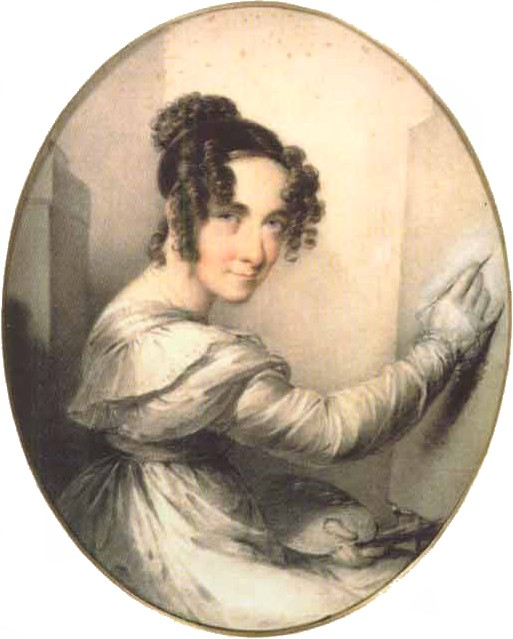
Therese Emilie Henriette Winkel

Therese Emilie Henriette Winkel (20 December 1784 – 7 March 1867) was a German artist, author, composer, and harpist. She also published under the pseudonyms Comala and Theorosa. Winkel was born in Weissenfels, but moved to Dresden in 1788 when her parents separated. She was briefly engaged to writer Johann Friedrich Rochlitz in 1800, but the engagement was broken for unknown reasons. Winkel and her mother traveled to Paris in 1806, where she studied painting with Jacques-Louis David, and music with François-Joseph Nadermann and Marie–Martin Marcel, Vicomte de Marin. During her stay in Paris, Winkel's letters to her friends were sometimes published in magazines and the Dresden evening newspaper. Rochlitz also had some of her music and art reviews published anonymously in the Journal for German Women.

Winkel returned to Germany in 1808, where she gave a series of concerts whose audiences included Achim von Arnim and Johann Wolfgang von Goethe. Winkel and her mother continued to live in Dresden, where once a year she was employed as a temporary harpist in the Dresden Opera orchestra, but otherwise earned her living by copying well-known paintings from the Dresden art gallery. She also gave language classes and was a harp teacher for the Saxon princesses. Her home became a meeting place for writers and the Dresden Song Circle. Winkel socialized with artists Gerhard von Kügelgen and Louise Seidler, and writers Theodor Hell and Otto Heinrich von Loeben.

Winkel continued to write articles for publication on art and music, sometimes under the pseudonym Theodosa. Her essay The Genius of Instruments appeared in Johann Friedrich Kind's magazine Die Harfe (The Harp) in 1815 under the pseudonym Comala.

Winkel made an altarpiece for the Brockwitz church in 1822 which is still preserved today, a copy of Giovanni Bellini's work Christ Blessing, which was created around 1500. Forty-five of her 127 paintings are now in the Bautzen City Museum, mostly copies of paintings by Italian masters of the 16th and 17th centuries and contemporary Dresden artists, as well as a few portraits. Seven of these paintings are on permanent loan to the Kügelgenhaus (Museum of Dresden Romanticism). The Weimar School of Art acquired her other art works after her death.

Her works include:

== Art ==
- Brockwitz altarpiece (1822)
- 127 paintings

== Music ==
- Three sonatas for harp and violin

== Writing ==
- art reviews
- Autobiography (1860)
- The Genius of Instruments (essay)
- letters
- music reviews
- pamphlets on harp construction
