= Abou Hassan (story) =

One of the Arabian Nights

"Abou Hassan" is one of the stories in the Arabian Nights. It concerns Abú al-Hasan-al-Khalí'a (Abou Hassan), a young merchant of Baghdad who is conveyed while asleep to the palace of Haroun-al-Raschid, and on awakening is made to believe that he is in truth the Caliph. Twice this jest is played upon Abou by the facetious Haroun, who ends by making him his favourite. In English translation the tale is sometimes entitled "The Sleeper Awakened". Burton chose "The Sleeper and the Waker" for his translation.

The story has been frequently dramatised as in Weber's opera Abu Hassan (1811), Abou Hassan or the Sleeper Awakened, by Joseph Tabrar (1885), The Dead Alive (1780) and Abou Hassan or an Arabian Knight's Entertainment, by Arthur O'Neil (1869). It has been more frequently imitated, notably in the induction to The Taming of the Shrew, where Christopher Sly is taken, dead drunk, into a lord's house and waited on when he awakens as if he were the proprietor of the place. There is no reason to believe that Shakespeare was acquainted with The Arabian Nights, however.
