= Oberon (Weber) =

Romantic opera by Carl Maria von Weber

Oberon, or The Elf-King's Oath
- Opera by Carl Maria von Weber
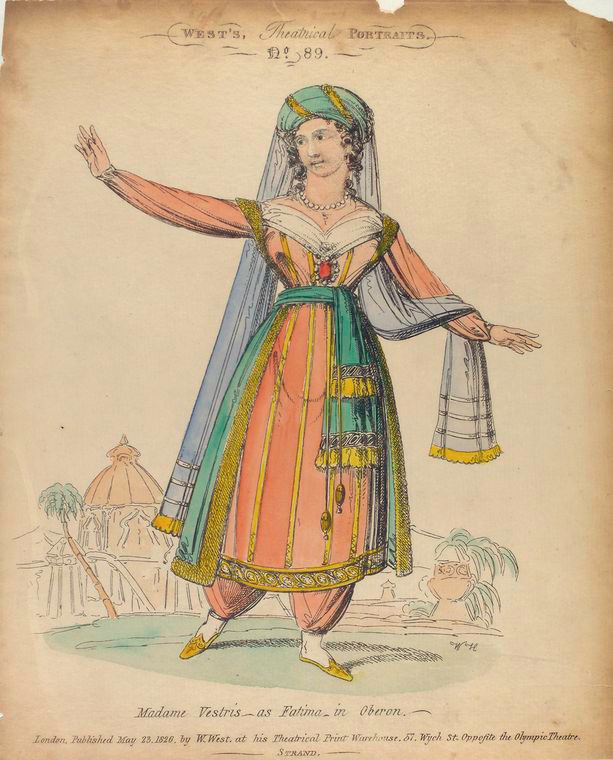
- Lucia Elizabeth Vestris as Fatima in an 1826 etching
- Librettist: James Robinson Planché
- Language: English
- Based on: Oberon by Christoph Martin Wieland
- Premiere: 12 April 1826; Covent Garden, London

Oberon, or The Elf-King's Oath (J. 306) is a 3-act romantic opera with spoken dialogue composed in 1825–26 by Carl Maria von Weber. The only English opera ever set by Weber, the libretto by James Robinson Planché was based on the German poem Oberon by Christoph Martin Wieland, which itself was based on the epic romance Huon de Bordeaux, a French medieval tale. It was premiered in London on 12 April 1826.

Against his doctor's advice, Weber undertook the project commissioned by the actor-impresario Charles Kemble for financial reasons. Having been offered the choice of Faust or Oberon as subject matter, he travelled to London to complete the music, learning English to be better able to follow the libretto, before the premiere of the opera. However, the pressure of rehearsals, social engagements and composing extra numbers destroyed his health, and Weber died in London on 5 June 1826.

The autograph manuscript of the opera was donated by Emperor Alexander II to the National Library of Russia, where it is currently preserved.

== Performance history ==
First performed at Covent Garden, London, on 12 April 1826, with Miss Paton as Reiza, Mme. Vestris as Fatima, Braham as Huon, Bland as Oberon and the composer conducting, it was a triumph with many encores, and the production was frequently revived. The libretto was translated into German later in 1826 by Theodor Hell, and it is in this German translation that the opera is most frequently performed. Weber was dissatisfied by the structure of the opera as it was produced in London, and intended to revise the work on his return to Germany, but he died in London before starting work on the revision. It is logical to assume that the German translation would have had the composer's approval (and that it would have been in that language that revisions would have been made), but he heard it only in English, and did not work on a revision or translated version before his death. Since then, other composers and librettists have revised the work, notably Franz Wüllner, Gustav Mahler (who, preparing a new performing version, rearranged some of the numbers and composed some linking music based on material from the existing score) and novelist-composer Anthony Burgess, who wrote a new libretto for Oberon and arranged the overture for guitar quartet. Franz Liszt made an arrangement of the overture in 1846 for solo piano (S.574).

The opera was soon mounted elsewhere: Leipzig (23 December 1826); in 1827 in Dublin (1 February), Edinburgh (26 August) and Vienna (20 March), Prague in 1828 and Budapest in 1829, with many other performances in western Europe from the 1830s to the 1860s.

The first performance of Oberon in America took place in New York at the Park Theatre on 20 September 1826. It was first seen in Paris in 1830 at the Théâtre Italien (in German). A lavish production was mounted in French at the Théâtre Lyrique in Paris on 27 February 1857, conducted by Adolphe Deloffre, and was praised by Berlioz.

In the 20th century, the Metropolitan Opera premiere was on 28 December 1918 (accumulating 13 performances up to 1921) with Rosa Ponselle as Reiza, conducted by Artur Bodanzky, who also composed recitatives in place of original spoken dialogue. The opera was staged at the Salzburg Festival in 1932 and 1934 under Walter, at the 1950 Holland Festival with Monteux conducting, at the Florence Festival in 1952 under Stiedry, and at the Paris Opera in 1953 with Cluytens. Although the opera has been staged intermittently in the 20th century, it has more successfully been given in concert.

== Roles ==
Roles, voice types, premiere cast
Role	Voice type	Premiere cast, 12 April 1826 Conductor: Carl Maria von Weber
Oberon, King of the Elves	tenor	Charles Bland
Puck	mezzo-soprano (en travesti)	Harriet Cawse
Titania	mute	Smith
Reiza, daughter of Haroun al Rachid, spelled Rezia in German	soprano	Mary Ann Paton
Fatima, Reiza's attendant	mezzo-soprano	Lucia Elizabeth Bartolozzi-Vestris
Sir Huon of Bordeaux, Duke of Guienne spelled Hüon in German	tenor	John Braham
Sherasmin, Huon's squire spelled Scherasmin in German	baritone	John Fawcett
Two mermaids	mezzo-sopranos	Mary Ann Goward and ?
Almanzor, Emir of Tunis	spoken	Cooper
Roshana, wife of Almanzor	spoken	Lacy
Hassan	bass	J. Isaacs
Namouna, Fatima's grandmother	spoken	Davenport
Haroun al Rachid, Caliph of Baghdad	spoken	Chapman
Babekan, a Saracen prince	spoken	Baker
Abdallah, a corsair	spoken	Horrebow
Charlemagne	mute	Austin
Hamet	spoken	Evans
Amrou	spoken	Atkins
Chorus: Fairies, ladies, knights, slaves, mermaids.

== Orchestration ==
The opera is scored for 2 flutes, 2 oboes, 2 clarinets (in A), 2 bassoons, 4 horns (in D and A), 2 trumpets (in D), 3 trombones (alto, tenor and bass), strings and timpani. The tunings for clarinets, horns and trumpets are from the overture. For instance, act 1 opens with horn in D.

== Synopsis ==
=== Act 1 ===
Fairies sing around the sleeping Oberon in his bower. Puck enters and recounts Oberon's quarrel with Titania, his queen: Oberon had vowed not to be reconciled with her, until a pair of human lovers are found who have been faithful to each other through all perils and temptations. Puck has ventured everywhere to find such couples, but in vain. Awakening, Oberon curses the rash vow he made. Puck tells him that the knight Sir Huon has been ordered by Emperor Charlemagne to go to Baghdad, slay the man on the Caliph's right hand, then kiss and wed the Caliph's daughter. Oberon decides that this knight and the princess will be the ones to assist him in his reconciliation with his queen. A vision of Reiza is conjured for Huon and his squire Sherasmin, and they are given a magic horn to summon aid from Oberon if needed. Fairies are called in to carry Huon on his mission.

On the banks of the Tigris Prince Babekan is rescued from a lion by Huon and Sherasmin. Babekan is actually the betrothed of Reiza but when he attacks Huon and Sherasmin they put the prince and his band to flight. Next Namouna, an old woman, tells Huon that Reiza is to be married the next day, but has also had a vision which has drawn her to Huon.

In the palace of Haroun al Rachid, Reiza confides to her attendant that she will only marry the knight in her vision. As Fatima announces the arrival of Huon, the two women rejoice in anticipation.

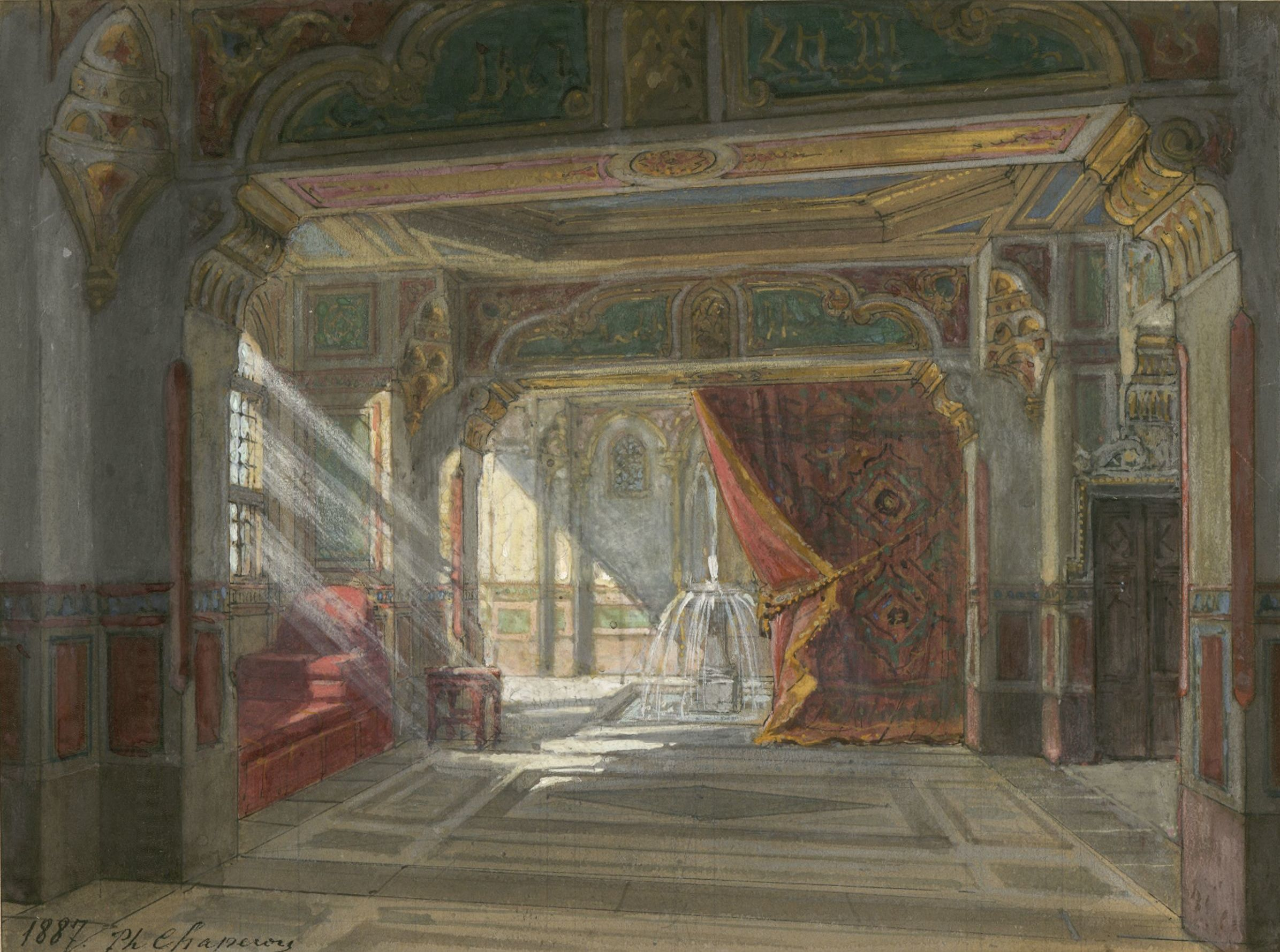
Philippe Chaperon's stage set for the first scene of act 2, designed for a revival of the opera at the Théâtre de l'Opéra-Comique in 1887

=== Act 2 ===
In the splendid court of Haroun al Rachid, a chorus sing praises to their ruler. Reiza is led in to wed Prince Babekan, seated on the caliph's right, but Huon and Sherasmin burst in, kill Babekan and flee with the princess and Fatima. A ship is to take them to Greece. The two couples express their love as they depart.

Puck invokes the spirits of the elements to wreck Huon's ship. Huon and Reiza survive, and he goes in search of more survivors while she sings of the fury and menace of the sea. At the close of her aria, she spies a ship approaching and signals to it. But it is a pirate ship, and she is abducted by Abdallah and his crew. Huon tries to save her but is wounded; he manages to sound the magic horn and Oberon appears. Oberon tells Puck to take Huon to Tunis and the house of Ibrahim. The mermaids sing happily over the unconscious prince.

=== Act 3 ===
In the garden of the Emir's house in Tunis, Fatima sings of her fate as a slave. She and Sherasmin are now married, and they sing of their childhood. Puck makes Huon appear, and after Fatima tells him that Reiza is in a harem, they plan her rescue.

In the harem of Almanzor, Reiza laments her lot and manages to get a message to Huon who sets off to release her. However, by accident he encounters Roshana, the Emir's wife, who tries to persuade Huon to kill Almanzor and marry her. He refuses, but the Emir discovers them and condemns Huon to death at the stake. Reiza implores the Emir to pardon Huon, but as she had scorned his advances, the Emir refuses and orders the two to be burned together. Oberon is summoned by Sherasmin blowing the magic horn. The Emir's slaves begin to dance, and after a second blast on the horn, Oberon and Titania appear. The Tunisians flee, the lovers are transported to Charlemagne's court, and Huon is pardoned.

== Music and noted arias ==
Overture
Arrangement of the overture, performed by the United States Navy Band's Concert Band

Comparing the unconventional plot and structure of Oberon with that of The Magic Flute, Gustav Kobbé contends that 'Oberon is musically strong enough to stand on its own merits'. Grove notes that despite the "unmitigated awfulness" of the libretto, Weber was able to provide musical characterisation for the main characters, at the same time colourfully evoking the mood of the different scenes; the careful recurring use of the horn call motif helps to give the impression of tying the work together. The fairy strands of the opera are given in delicate, beautifully orchestrated music that often anticipates the fairy music of Mendelssohn. Indeed, Mendelssohn quoted the descending scale theme from the finale of act 2 ("Hark, the mermaids") in his own overture to A Midsummer Night's Dream. It is not clear whether Mendelssohn planned his entire overture as a tribute to Weber, although Mendelssohn's overture borrows the same key, expression, and orchestration in addition to the melody.

The most famous numbers:

- The overture (passages of which are quoted by Berlioz in his Treatise on Instrumentation) which is played regularly in the concert hall. It is based on themes from within the opera including the magic horn call; and the soprano's aria "Ocean, thou mighty monster: ("Ozean, du Ungeheuer")
- Act 1: Oberon's aria "Fatal vow!" ("Schreckens Schwur!")
- Act 1: Huon's aria "From boyhood trained" ("Von Jugend auf in der Kampf")
- Act 1: Huon's aria "Ah! 'tis a glorious sight to see" (excluded from the German score)
- Act 2: Huon's Prayer "Ruler of this awful hour" ("Vater! Hör' mich flehn zu Dir!")
- Act 2: Reiza's aria "Ocean, thou mighty monster" ("Ozean, du Ungeheuer")
- Act 2: Fatima's aria "A lonely Arab maid" ("Arabiens einsam Kind")
- Act 3: Fatima's aria "O Araby!" ("Arabien, mein Heimathland!)
- Act 3: Reiza's aria "Mourn thou, poor heart" ("Traure mein Herz")
- Act 3: Huon's aria "I revel in hope and joy" ("Ich jub'le in Glück")

== Recordings ==
- The first commercial recording was in German, and was conducted by Rafael Kubelík, whose cast featured Birgit Nilsson as Reiza, Plácido Domingo as Sir Huon of Bordeaux, Julia Hamari as Fatima, and Hermann Prey as Sherasmin,(Deutsche Grammophon, Cat.# J306, Bavarian Radio Symphony Orchestra, Herkulessaal, Munich, 1970, studio recording.)
- There have been several other recordings, such as those by James Conlon (Mahler's version) on EMI, Marek Janowski (a note-complete recording) for RCA, and Sir John Eliot Gardiner (the original English version on period instruments) for Philips.
