= E C Hedmondt =

Canadian opera singer

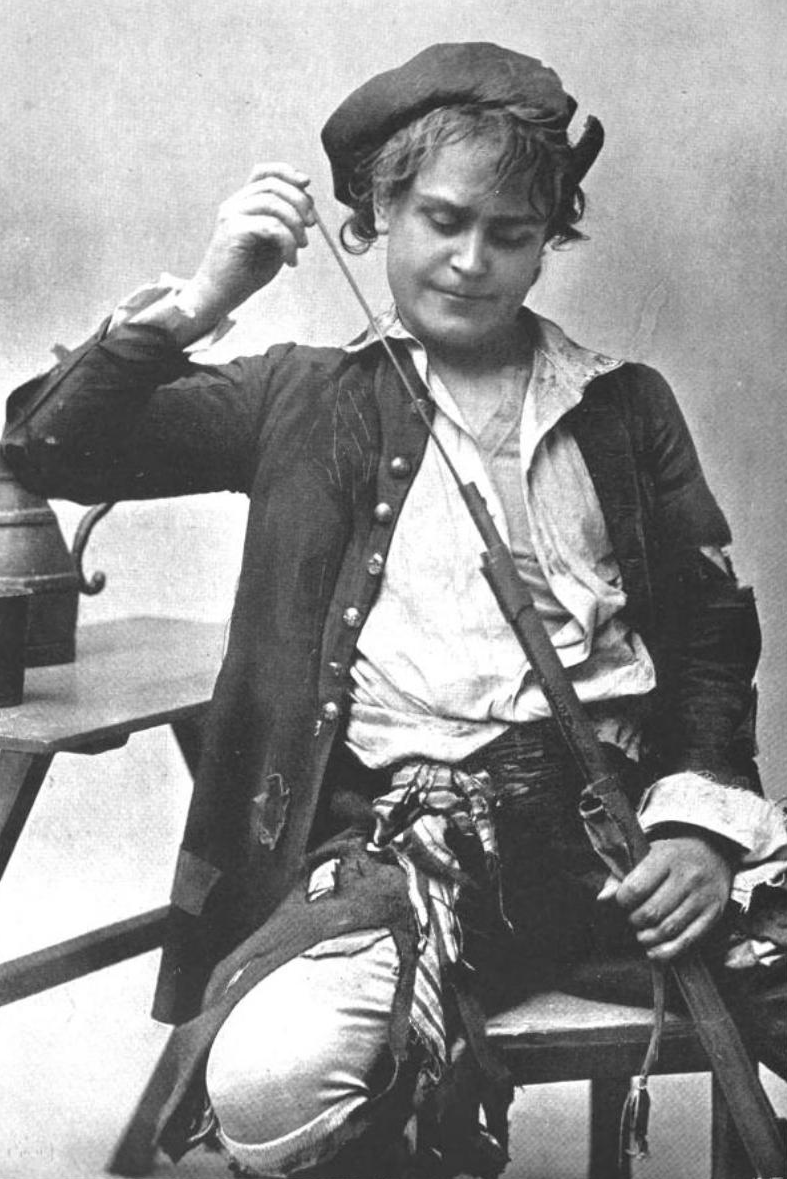
- Starring in Rip Van Winkle in 1897
- Born: Emmanuel Christian Hausgen; 24 October 1857; Ontario, Canada
- Died: 25 April 1940 (aged 82); London, England
- Occupation: Opera singer

Emmanuel Christian Hedmondt (24 October 1857 – 25 April 1940) was a Canadian-born tenor who made a long and distinguished career, mainly within the operatic repertoire. He changed to this stage name from his family name Hausgen. He also used the name Charles Hedmont, although spellings of this vary.

== Early life and career ==
E C Hedmondt was born in Ontario on 24 October 1857. After studying in Montreal and Leipzig, he made his debut at Berlin. From 1882-87 he was a principal tenor at Leipzig, where his repertoire included several Mozart roles including Belmonte, Ottavio, Tamino, and Idomeneo (the latter being a rarity at the time). He also sang Max in Der Freischütz. In 1886, he appeared at Bayreuth as David in Die Meistersinger. On 20 January 1888 at the Leipzig house he created the role of Don Gaston de Viratos (the romantic lead) at the premiere of the Weber opera Die Drei Pintos, which had been completed by Gustav Mahler. And on that occasion, Mahler himself was the conductor.

From 1891 to 1909 Hedmondt was a principal tenor with the Carl Rosa Opera Company. In 1895 he sang Siegmund at Covent Garden, the first time it was performed in English. When Karl Richter conducted the famous English language Ring cycle at Covent Garden in 1908, Hedmondt was stage manager (i.e. director) as well as singing Loge. In 1914 he was a member of the Quinlan Opera Company that toured to South Africa, Australia and Canada.

His wife Marie sang until a throat operation forced her retirement, after which she taught at Leipzig Conservatorium and subsequently. When in Britain they lived in Liverpool and were friendly with the Boult family. It was because of this connection that Adrian Boult was introduced to Artur Nikisch and encouraged to study with him in Leipzig from September 1912. While there he also acted as accompanist at lessons given by Mrs Hedmondt.

Through Hedmondt's work with Carl Rosa and as producer with other companies he spent some time in Scotland, Edinburgh in particular. In 1917 he toured Scotland in the musical comedy Our Theodore. In 1922, he is recorded as acting as producer for the Edinburgh Opera Company's third season, at the King's Theatre. By 1934, The Stage (April 12) was able to note that the Edinburgh Opera Company was back at the King's with Yeomen of the Guard and Jeanie Deans. The writer pointed out that Hedmondt had in fact performed a leading role, that of George Staunton, at the latter's premiere forty years previously.

Hedmondt died in London on 25 April 1940.
