= Tartuffe (Mechem) =

Tartuffe is an opera in three acts by Kirke Mechem. Mechem also wrote the English libretto. Based on the Molière's play Tartuffe, or the Impostor, it is a modern opera buffa set in Paris in the 17th century. Tartuffe premiered on May 27, 1980, at the San Francisco Opera It has since seen over 400 performances in six countries and been translated into German, Russian, Chinese, Japanese and Czech. A "number opera" with arias, duets, trios and ensembles, Tartuffe is one of the most performed operas by an American composer. Also often sung is Mechem's choral arrangement of the song "The Lighthearted Lovers," excerpted from Dorine's aria, "Fair Robin I Love."

== Roles ==
- Tartuffe, a hypocrite - baritone
- Orgon, a wealthy Parisian - bass
- Elmire, Orgon's 2nd wife - mezzo-soprano
- Damis, Orgon's son - high baritone
- Mariane, Orgon's daughter - soprano
- Valére, Mariane's fiancé - tenor
- Dorine, Mariane's maid - coloratura soprano
- Mme. Pernelle, Orgon's mother - mezzo-soprano
- Flipote, Mme. Pernelle's maid (silent)
- Optional Chorus

== Synopsis ==
=== Act 1 ===
Madame Pernelle, together with her maid, Flipote, is leaving the house of her son, Orgon. She berates the rest of the household for not living up to the standards of "that holy man" Tartuffe, whom Orgon has befriended. Elmire, Orgon's second wife, vainly attempts to make peace. Orgon's daughter, Mariane, supported by her brother, Damis, enlists Elmire's help in holding Orgon to his promise that Mariane may wed Valère.

Upon Orgon's return home, the maid Dorine tries to tell him that his wife has been ill, but Orgon asks only about Tartuffe. When Elmire questions Orgon about his promise to Mariane, he evades her, and indeed tells Mariane that she must marry Tartuffe. At this, the eavesdropping Dorine bursts into laughter, pretending that Orgon must be joking. She ridicules Tartuffe and so saucily interrupts Orgon that he storms out.

Dorine encourages Mariane to resist her father. But now Valère arrives, having heard a rumor of Mariane's betrothal. Both lovers are too proud to admit their dependence upon one another, and they become locked into a furious quarrel. Eventually Dorine reconciles them, and they plot a scheme to outwit Orgon and get rid of Tartuffe.

=== Act 2 ===
Dorine has arranged a meeting between Tartuffe and Elmire. Damis insists upon hiding to observe them. Tartuffe arrives with a great show of sanctity, and even manages to use this as a perverted justification of his love for Elmire. She reproaches him for his advances, but promises not to tell her husband if Tartuffe will persuade Orgon to permit Mariane to wed Valère. Damis springs out of his hiding place, swearing to reveal Tartuffe's duplicity, despite Elmire's desire only to right the wrong and avoid a scandal. Orgon arrives, and Damis denounces Tartuffe, but the hypocrite so cunningly chastises himself that Orgon blindly accuses his son of stigmatizing him, and orders Damis from the house. Now sure of his position, Tartuffe manipulates Orgon into deeding his house and goods over to him.

=== Act 3 ===
Scene 1: Elmire at last persuades Orgon to witness Tartuffe's treachery with his own eyes. Orgon is to hide under a table, and come out when Elmire signals by coughing. The wary villain enters. Elmire professes great feeling for him, and Tartuffe demands to "savor some tender favor" as proof, freely admitting his lust for her. In spite of Elmire's frantic coughing, Orgon does not emerge until Tartuffe begins to speak contemptuously of him. The game is up, but Tartuffe merely shakes the deed of gift at Orgon and goes out, threatening that "It's you, not I, who has to leave!"

Scene 2: Madame Pernelle returns to defend Tartuffe against these latest accusations. Her opinion changes, however, when Tartuffe himself appears to oust Orgon, accompanied by an obsequious court bailiff. Orgon refuses to go, and Tartuffe leaves to call the police. The "bailiff" reveals himself as Damis in disguise, and he is quickly followed by Valère in disguise as a police officer, and Mariane as a special envoy of the King, who has been sent in order to arrest Tartuffe! The "royal envoy" enumerates Tartuffe's crimes, and orders him to leave the country or be jailed. Tartuffe flees, and Orgon, confessing his foolishness, presents Mariane to Valère amid general rejoicing.
Excerpt from Tartuffe Score.

== Arias ==
- "Father, I beg you" - Mariane
- "No more, false heart" - Valere
- "Fair Robin I love" - Dorine
- "Every Day at Church" - Orgon
- "How strange men are... What a myth is marital bliss" - Elmire

== Sources ==
- Croan, Robert (November 19, 1988). "Composer Finds Success Better Late Than Never". Post-Gazette, p. 18
- G. Schirmer. Tartuffe | Kirke Mechem
- Kornick, Rebecca Hodell (1991). Recent American opera: A Production Guide. Columbia University Press. ISBN 0-231-06920-0
- Rockwell, John (August 19, 1982). "Lake George's Tartuffe. New York Times
