= Opera South =

Semi-professional English opera company

Opera South is a semi-professional British opera company based on the borders of Surrey, Hampshire, and West Sussex.

Specializing in staging lesser-known operas, the company was founded in 1984 as 'Opera Omnibus' at Haslemere and was soon incorporated as a registered charity (1985) and limited company (1986). The company rebranded itself as 'Opera South' in the first years of the 21st century. In 2005 the Guildford Philharmonic Orchestra joined the company and plays at the fully staged productions. The company's president is currently Ann Murray.
