= Bagnall Beach Observatory =

Astronomical observatory on the east coast of Australia

- Observatory code: 433
- Location: New South Wales, Australia
- Coordinates: 32°44′18″S 152°06′29″E
- Website: gc.users.nelsonbay.com/observatory.htm
- Location of Bagnall Beach Observatory

Bagnall Beach Observatory (obs. code: 433) is a privately owned astronomical observatory operated by Greg Crawford, located in Corlette, New South Wales, on the east coast of Australia, consisting of a 0.28-m f/10 Schmidt–Cassegrain telescope. The observatory has discovered 3 minor planets:

- (112835) 2002 QL_{17}
- (124033) 2001 FP_{127}
- (191213) 2002 RA_{1}

== See also ==
- List of astronomical observatories
