= Theodor Hell =

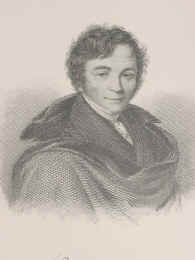
Theodor Hell.

Theodor Hell ("Theodore Bright") was the pseudonym of Karl Gottfried Theodor Winkler (9 February 1775, Waldenburg, Saxony – 24 September 1856, Dresden), a court councillor (Hofrath) in Dresden from 1824, who was the centre of literary life through his work as editor, translator and critic. He was the theatrical secretary from 1815.

He is mostly remembered for his friendships with the composers Carl Maria von Weber, Therese Emilie Henriette Winkel, Giacomo Meyerbeer (and brief contact with Franz Schubert and Richard Wagner) — for example, he wrote the words to Schubert's "Das Heimweh" (D456) and the libretto for Weber's opera Die Drei Pintos. He was the editor for many years of the literary magazine Penelope, and of the Dresdner Abendzeitung (from 1817 to 1843) in association with Friedrich Kind. Dresden appointed him honorary citizen in 1851.

== Selected works ==
=== Lyrical ===
- Das Heimweh
- Im Englischen Garten bei München (1811)
- Des Dichters Los

=== Drama ===
- Der Geschädigte (1817)
- Der neun und zwanzigste Januar 1819 (1819)

=== Translations ===
- Jean-Jacques Rousseau: Julie, or the New Heloise
- James Planché: the opera Oberon. Translated from the original English in 1826, after the death of the opera's composer, Carl Maria von Weber.

== Bibliography ==
- Carl Friedrich Glasenapp. Das Leben Richard Wagners. Chapter 1.2.
- Hermann Anders Krüger, Pseudo-Romantik: Friedrich Kind und der Dresdener Liederkreis: Ein Beitrag zur Geschichte der Romantik. Leipzig, 1904.
- Hellmut Fleischhauer, "Theodor Hell und seine Tätigkeit als Journalleiter, Herausgeber, Übersetzer und am Theater." Diss. Univ. of Munich 1930. Borna and Leipzig 1930.
- Franz Brümmer. Deutsches Dichterlexicon, volume 2, 1877. (Full list of works.)
