= Johann Nepomuk Kalcher =

German organist and composer (1764–1827)

Johann Nepomuk Kalcher (15 May 1764 – 2 February 1827) was a German organist and composer. He was a student of Joseph Graetz and an instructor of the young Carl Maria von Weber when the latter moved to Munich in 1798.
