= Carl Gottlob Cramer =

German writer (1758–1817)

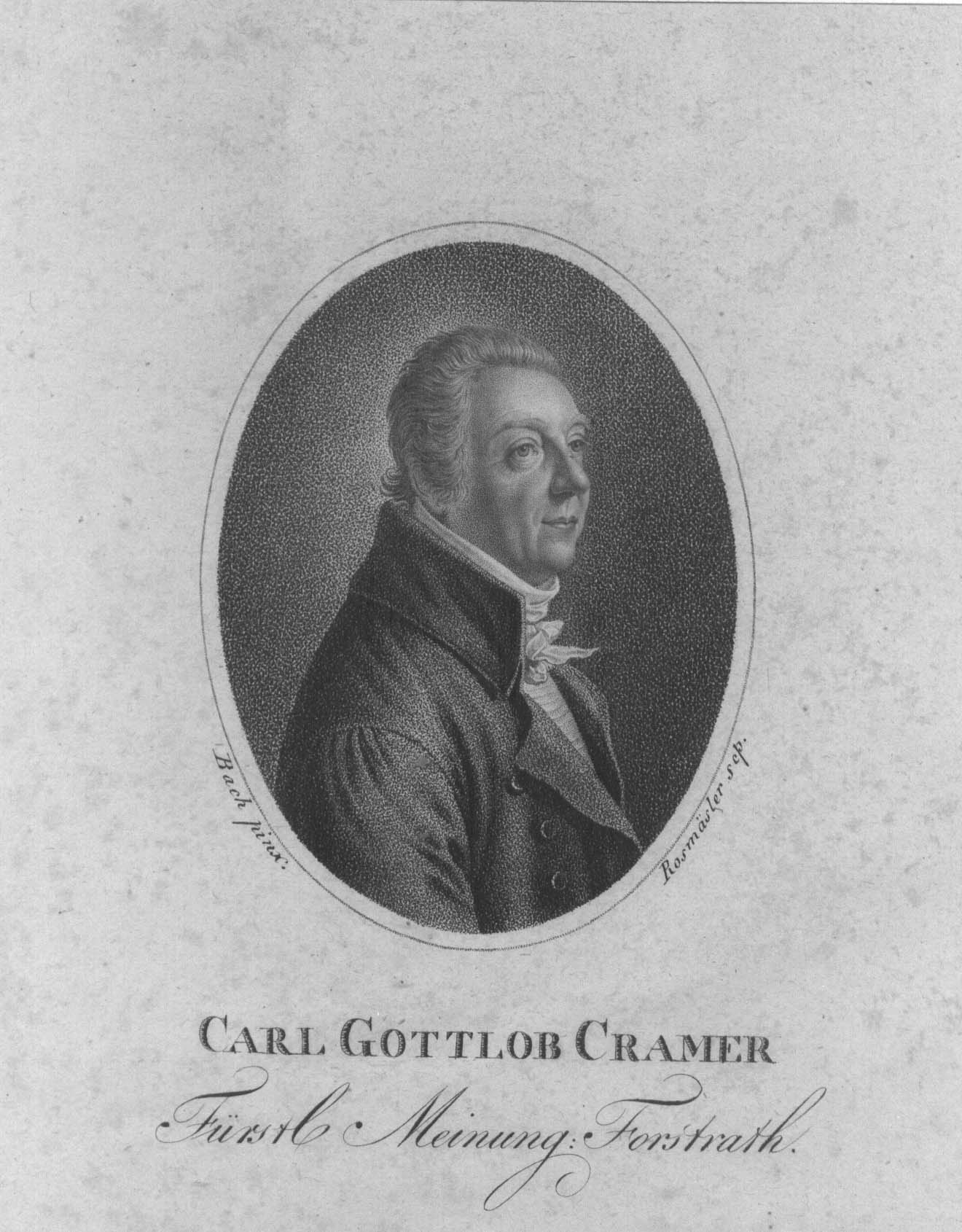
Carl Gottlob Cramer

Carl Gottlob Cramer (3 March 1758 – 7 June 1817) was a popular German writer of heroic romance. His works include Friedrich von Eisenbart und Baron Sturmdrang, Ritter Euros und seine Freunde, and Freuden und Leiden des edlen Baron Just Friedrich auf der Semmelburg. Carl Maria von Weber's opera Peter Schmoll und seine Nachbarn was written to a libretto by Josef Türk after Cramer's popular novel of the same name.

== Sources ==
- Morgan, Joseph E. (2017). Experiencing Carl Maria Von Weber:A Listener's Companion. Lanham, Maryland: Rowman & Littlefield Publishers. ISBN 978-1442255579.
- Warrack, John (1976). Carl Maria Von Weber. Cambridge, England: Cambridge University Press. ISBN 978-0521291217.
- Murphy, Agnes Genevieve (1935). Banditry, Chivalry, and Terror in German Fiction, 1790-1830. University of Chicago.
