= Kirke Mechem =

American composer (born 1925)

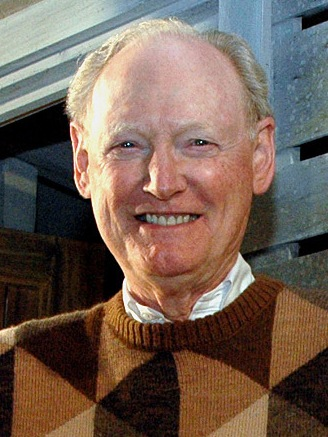
- Born: August 16, 1925 (age 101); Wichita, Kansas, U.S.
- Notable work: Tartuffe

Kirke Mechem (born August 16, 1925) is an American composer. His first opera, Tartuffe has had over 350 performances in nine countries. He has composed more than 250 works in almost every form. In 2002, ASCAP registered performances of his music in 42 countries. He has been called the "dean of American choral composers". His memoir, Believe Your Ears: Life of a Lyric Composer, was published by Rowman & Littlefield in 2015; it won ASCAP Foundation's 48th annual Deems Taylor/Virgil Thomson Award for outstanding musical biography.

== Background ==
Mechem was born in Wichita, Kansas, on August 16, 1925. During World War II, he served two and half years in the army, and then enrolled at Stanford University. He took a harmony course taught by Harold Schmidt, the choral director, and continued his study of harmony and counterpoint, changing his major to music at the end of his junior year. His principal teachers at Stanford were Leonard Ratner (harmony and counterpoint) and Sandor Salgo (orchestration and conducting). In his senior year, Mechem orchestrated and conducted the student variety show. He earned a master's degree at Harvard in 1953, studying composition with Walter Piston and Randall Thompson, and was winner of the Boott Prize for vocal composition. He was assistant choral director for three years at Stanford, composing both choral and instrumental music and conducting an opera.

Mechem lived in Vienna, Austria, in 1956–57 and 1961–63. In 1963, Mechem returned with his wife and children to San Francisco. He became composer-in-residence at the University of San Francisco and has taught at other universities as a guest composer and conductor. On May 13, 2012, Mechem received an honorary Doctorate from the University of Kansas for "notable contributions to choral music and opera". He has also received lifetime-achievement awards from the National Opera Association and the American Choral Directors Association Western Division.

== Career ==
Most of Mechem's early work was for chorus. Some of these pieces, composed as an undergraduate and graduate student, were published, including "Make A Joyful Noise", (recorded by the Mormon Tabernacle Choir) and "Give Thanks unto the Lord." The latter won the tri-annual SAI American Music Award in 1959. His Opus 5 was a Suite for Piano, later followed by a Piano Sonata and a book of teaching pieces called Whims. In Vienna, he began writing chamber music. His Trio for Violin, Cello and Piano was followed by a Divertimento for Flute and String Trio, and by his first String Quartet, which was the only American prize-winner at the fourth International Competition for Composition in Monaco.

Mechem's Symphony No. 1 was premiered in 1965 by the San Francisco Symphony under Josef Krips. Krips commissioned Mechem to write a Second Symphony, which he premiered in 1967. Mechem wrote commissioned choral suites, cantatas and other vocal works during the early 1970s. In the 1970s he saw a performance of Molière's classic satire, Tartuffe, which inspired him to write his first opera. He wrote his own libretto, as he does for all his operas. Premiered in 1980 by the San Francisco Opera, Tartuffe has since played to audiences in Canada, China, Russia, Austria, Germany, Sweden, Hungary and Japan, as well as in the United States.

The success of Tartuffe encouraged Mechem to embark upon an opera based on the life of abolitionist, John Brown. An essay Mechem wrote for the American Music Center's online magazine, New Music Box, describes the long evolution of this work. The premiere of John Brown did not take place until 2008. In the twenty-some years between John Brown's inception and premiere, Mechem wrote many other compositions, including two new operas: The Rivals, based upon Sheridan's classic play of the same name; and Pride and Prejudice, on Jane Austen's famous novel. "The Rivals" received its professional premiere in September, 2011 by the Skylight Opera Theater, Milwaukee to rave reviews—"A hit, an instant classic". "Pride and Prejudice" was given its concert premiere by the Redwood Symphony in April 2019. Mechem's Songs of The Slave, a suite from John Brown, had its full premiere in 1994 and has enjoyed more than 100 performances.

In 1990, Mechem made his first of three trips to Russia, then still the Soviet Union. That year he was a guest of honor at the International Tchaikovsky Competition in Moscow, and was invited back for an all-Mechem symphonic concert by the USSR Radio-Television Orchestra in March 1991, the first time a Soviet orchestra had devoted an entire concert to a living American composer. Five years later he was invited to attend the Russian-language premiere of Tartuffe by the Mussorgsky National Theater for Opera and Ballet in Saint Petersburg.

Throughout his career Mechem continued to write commissioned choral works. In 2007 the American Choral Directors Association celebrated his 50 years of choral publications with a retrospective concert, performed by the Western Illinois University Singers, at its national convention. On August 16, 2025, Mechem turned 100.
