= Edinburgh Opera Company =

Edinburgh Opera Company was an opera company that existed in Edinburgh during the 20th century from around 1919 until the 1970s. It performed in theaters such as The Gateway Theatre, the Royal Lyceum Theatre and the King's Theatre, Edinburgh. One of its soloists was Canadian tenor Emanual Christian Hedmont who also produced Edinburgh Opera Company's shows in 1922 at the King's Theatre and at the Royal Lyceum Theatre in 1923.

== Performances ==
Performances included Cavalleria Rusticana, Daughter of the Regiment, Il trovatore (King's Theatre 1922); Verdi's Ernani (Royal Lyceum Theatre 14, 16, 18 May 1923), Meyerbeer's The Huguenots (Royal Lyceum Theatre 15, 17, 19 May 1923); Bohemian Girl, Cavalleria Rusticana, Trial by Jury and The Jolly Beggers (Royal Lyceum, 1931); Yeoman of the Guard, Jeannie Deans (King's Theatre 1934); Orpheus (Gateway Theatre 1958); Faust (Gateway Theatre 1959); Semele (Gateway Theatre 1960); Der Freischutz (Gateway Theatre 1961); L'elisir d’amore (Gateway Theatre 1962); The Bartered Bride (Gateway Theatre 1963); Flying Dutchman (Royal Lyceum Theatre 1979).
