= Carl Siedel =

American politician

Member of the New Hampshire House of Representatives from the 28th Hillsborough district
- In office December 3, 2014 – December 5, 2018 Serving with Elizabeth Ferreira (2014–2018), Eric R. Eastman (2014–2016), Jan Schmidt (2016–2018)
- Preceded by: Sylvia E. Gale; Angeline A. Kopka; Jan Schmidt
- Succeeded by: Andy Schmidt; William Bordy; Bruce Cohen

Member of the New Hampshire House of Representatives from the 20th Hillsborough district
- In office December 3, 2008 – December 5, 2012 Serving with Anthony P. Matarazzo (2008–2010), Ruth Ginsburg (2008–2010), Sean M. McGuinness (2010-2012), Kevin A. Avard (2010–2012)
- Preceded by: Eric P. Rochette
- Succeeded by: Frank A. Byron; Ralph G. Boehm

Personal details
- Party: Republican

Carl Siedel is an American politician. He served as a Republican member for the Hillsborough 28th district of the New Hampshire House of Representatives. He was first elected in 2008. He lost reelection in 2018.
