= Abu Hassan =

Opera by Carl Maria von Weber

- Singspiel by Carl Maria von Weber
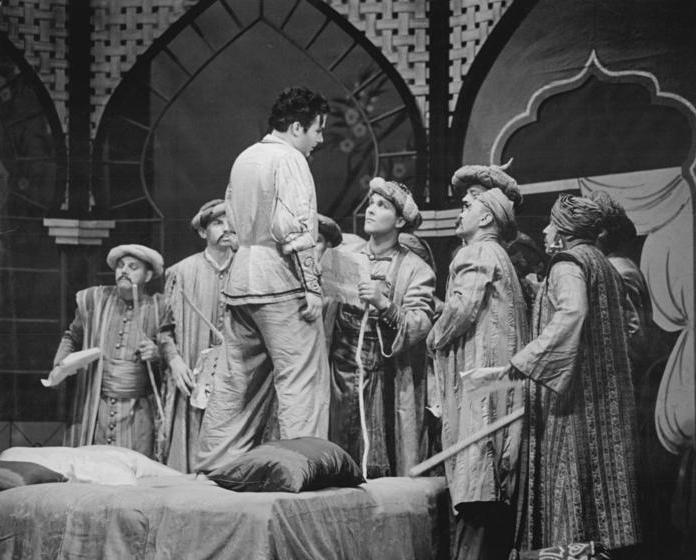
- Abu Hassan (Peter Schreier) and his creditors in a 1960 performance
- Librettist: Franz Carl Hiemer
- Language: German
- Based on: Story from One Thousand and One Nights
- Premiere: 4 June 1811; Residenz Theater, Munich

Abu Hassan (J. 106) is a comic opera in one act by Carl Maria von Weber to a German libretto by Franz Carl Hiemer, based on a story in One Thousand and One Nights. It was composed between 11 August 1810 and 12 January 1811 and has set numbers with recitative and spoken dialogue. The work is a Singspiel in the then popular Turkish style.

== Performance history ==
Abu Hassan was first performed at the Residenz Theater in Munich on 4 June 1811, conducted by the composer. In London, it was produced in English at Theatre Royal, Drury Lane in 1835, and in Italian at Drury Lane on 12 May 1870 (at the same time as Mozart's L'oca del Cairo), the translation being made by Salvatore Marchesi, and the dialogue set to recitative by Luigi Arditi.

Abu Hassan is not now part of the commonly performed operatic repertory, though it is sometimes staged. The overture is, however, well known and has been recorded separately many times.

== Roles ==
Roles, voice types, premier cast
Role	Voice type	Premiere cast, 4 June 1811 Conductor: C. M. v. Weber
Abu Hassan, cup-bearer to the Caliph	tenor	Georg Mittermayr
Fatime, his wife	soprano	Josefa Flerx
Omar, a money-lender	bass	Aloys Muck
Caliph	spoken	
Zobeide, the Caliph's wife	spoken	

== Synopsis ==
Abu Hassan, a favorite of the Caliph of Baghdad, is heavily in debt. To retrieve his fortunes, he sends his wife Fatime to the Caliph's wife, Zobeide, to announce his (Hassan's) death, for which Fatime will receive 50 pieces of gold and a piece of brocade. After Fatime has set off, creditors enter Abu Hassan's house to collect money. Omar, the richest creditor, is tricked into believing that Fatime has spoken to him of love, so he agrees to pay all the other creditors.

Fatime returns with the presents from Zobeide. Abu Hassan now goes to visit the Caliph, intending to try a similar story about his wife and get money from him. While he is out, Omar reappears and demands a kiss from Fatime, but Abu Hassan returns. Omar hides in an adjoining room, and the husband and wife enjoy his fear of being discovered.

Now Mesrur, a messenger from the Caliph, arrives, to see if Fatime really is dead. Both the Caliph and his wife want to know who it was who died, and if both, who died first. Mesrur, seeing Fatime lying on the divan, her husband in apparent distress at her side, runs back to tell the Caliph. He has only just gone, when Zobeide's nurse runs in on a similar errand. This time it is Hassan who feigns death, while Fatime is all tears and lamenting.

Finally the Caliph and his wife are announced. Hassan and Fatime throw themselves on the divan, covering themselves, as if dead. The Caliph now offers 1,000 gold pieces to anyone who will tell him which of them died first. Hassan revives and throws himself at the Caliph's feet, saying "It was me – I died first!" He asks for a pardon, as well as the gold. Fatime does likewise, and the Caliph pardons them both. Omar, having paid off Hassan's debts in the hope of winning Fatime's heart, is sent away in disgrace.

== Recordings ==
The opera has been recorded by Wolfgang Sawallisch, Leopold Ludwig, Gustav Kuhn and Gennady Rozhdestvensky, the last in Russian. A recording by Heinz Rögner with the Staatskapelle Dresden features Ingeborg Hallstein, Peter Schreier and Theo Adam (RCA Classic / Sony BMG). Cappella Coloniensis, conducted by Bruno Weil, recorded it in 2003.
