= List of compositions by Carl Maria von Weber =

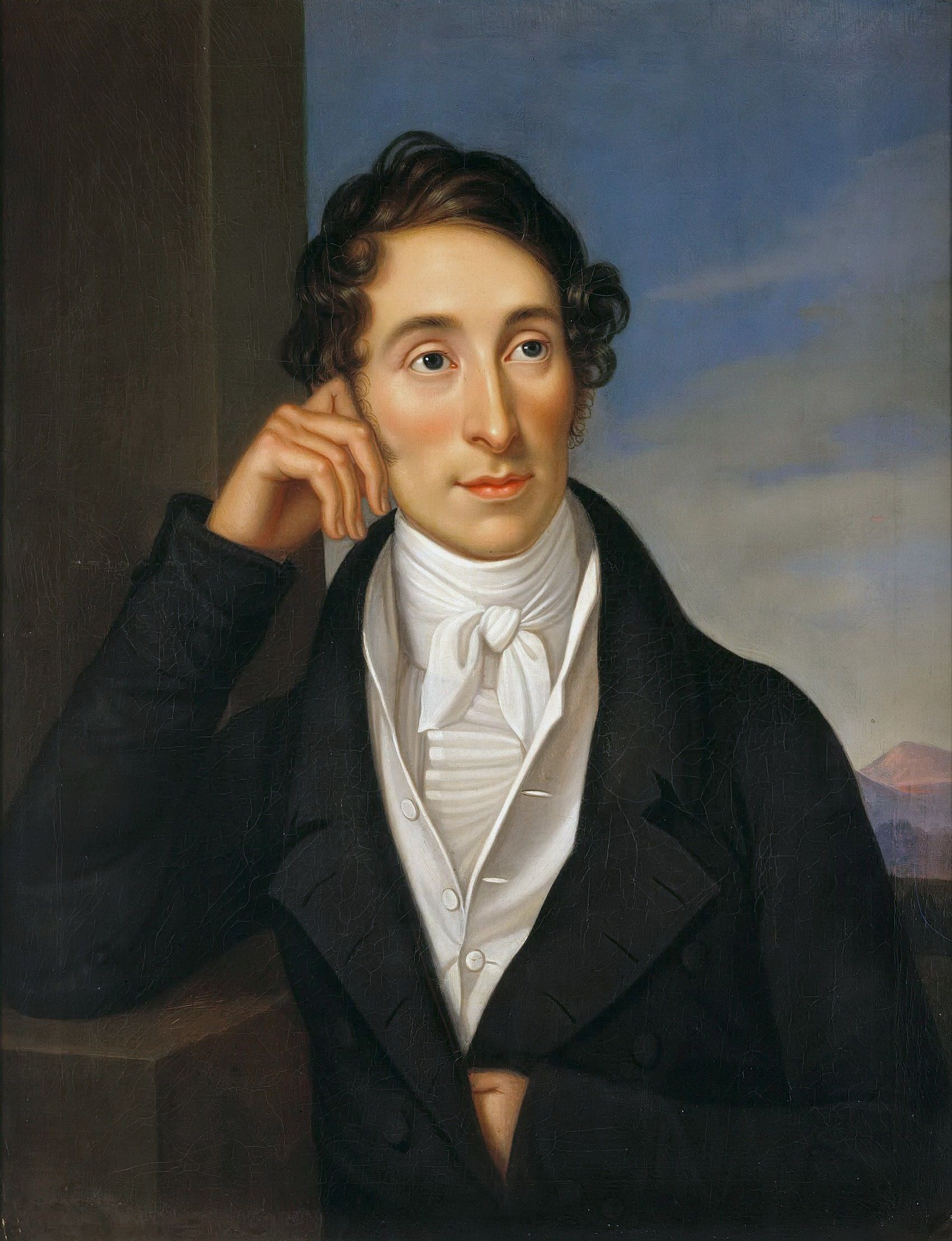
Carl Maria von Weber in 1821

The following is a complete list of compositions by Carl Maria von Weber in order of both opus number and catalogue number. A complete chronological catalogue of Weber's works was compiled by Friedrich Wilhelm Jähns and published in 1871. Catalogue numbers are indicated by a preceding "J".

== By opus number ==
Op.	Description
1	6 Fughettas, J. 1-6 (1798)
2	6 Variations in C on an Original Theme, J. 7 (1800)
3	6 petites pièces faciles, J. 9-14 (1801)
4	12 allemandes, J. 15-26 (1801)
5	8 Variations on a theme from Vogler's Castor and Pollux, J. 40 (1801)
6	6 Variations in C on a theme from Vogler's Samori, J. 43 (1804)
7	7 Variations on "Vien quà, Dorina bella", J. 53 (1807)
8	Opera, Peter Schmoll und seine Nachbarn, J. 8 (1801–02)
9	Thème original varié, J. 55 (1808)
10a	6 pieces for Piano 4-hands, J. 81-6 (1809)
10b	6 Violin Sonatas, J. 99-104 (1810)
11	Piano Concerto No. 1 in C major, J. 98 (1810)
12	Momento capriccioso in B♭ major, J. 56 (1808)
13	5 Songs & a Canon, J. 91, 96, 52, 72, 97, 35
14	Cantata, "Der erste Ton", J. 58 (1808, revised 1810)
15	6 Songs, J. 73, 63, 74, 68, 67, 57
16	Aria, "Il momento s'avvicina", J. 93 (1810)
17	Overture in E♭ major
18	Piano Quartet in B♭ major, J. 76 (1811)
19	Symphony No. 1 in C major, J. 50 (1806–07)
20	Concerto (Fantasie) for cello and orchestra (Grand pot-pourri), J. 64 (1808)
21	Grande polonaise in E♭ major, J. 59 (1808)
22	Nine Variations on a Norwegian Air for violin and piano, J. 61 (1808)
23	4 Songs & 2 Choruses, J. 62, 70, 117, 130, 136, 133
24	Piano Sonata No. 1 in C major, J. 138 (1812)
25	5 Songs for voice & guitar, J. 140, 110, 112, 137, 113
26	Clarinet Concertino in E♭ major, J. 109 (1811)
27	Overture, "Der Beherrscher der Geister" ("Ruler of the Spirits"), J. 122 (1811)
28	7 Variations on "A peine au sortir de l'enfance", J. 141 (1812)
29	3 Songs, J. 108, 124, 120
30	6 Songs, J. 42, 161, 157, 160, 159, 156
31	3 Duets, J. 107, 123, 125
32	Piano Concerto No. 2 in E♭ major, J. 155 (1812)
33	7 Variations on a theme from Silvana, J. 128 (1811)
34	Clarinet Quintet in B♭ major, J. 182 (1815)
35	Andante e Rondo ungarese in C minor, for bassoon & orchestra, J. 79 (1809)
36	Cantata, "In seiner Ordnung schafft der Herr", J. 154 (1812)
37	Incidental music for Turandot (Schiller, after Gozzi), J. 75 (1809)
38	Divertimento assai facile, for guitar & piano, J.207 (1816)
39	Piano Sonata No. 2 in A♭ major, J. 199 (1816)
40	9 Variations, J. 179 (1815)
41	"Leyer und Schwert" (cycle of 4 songs), J. 174-7 (1814)
42	"Leyer und Schwert" (6 male choruses), J. 168-73 (1814)
43	Songs, "Bei der Musik des Prinzen Louis Ferdinand von Preussen", J. 205 (1816)
44	Cantata, "Kampf und Sieg", J. 190 (1815)
45	Horn Concertino in E minor, J. 188 (1806 version lost, revised 1815)
46	Song cycle, "Die Temperamente beim Verluste der Geliebten", J. 200–3
47	6 Songs, J. 197, 198, 189, 192, 196, 166
48	Grand duo concertant, J. 204 (1815–16)
49	Piano Sonata No. 3 in D minor, J. 206 (1816)
50	Aria, "Misera me!" J. 121 (1811)
51	Aria, "Non paventar mia vita", J. 181 (1815)
52	Scena, "Ah, se Edmondo", J. 178 (1815)
53a	Aria, "Signor, se padre sei", J. 142 (1812)
53b	Chorus, "Zwei Kränze zum Annen-Tage", J. 218 (1817)
54	5 Songs & 2 Duets, J. 232, 209, 212, 208, 211, 233, 231
55	7 Variations in C on a Gypsy Song, J.219 (1817)
56	Scena & aria, "Was sag ich?" J. 239 (1818)
57	Scena, "Ah, se Edmondo", (for Méhul's opera, Héléna), J.178 (1815)
58	Jubel-Kantate, J. 244 (1818)
59	Jubel-Ouverture in E major, J. 245 (1818)
60	8 pieces for Piano 4-hands, J. 236, 242, 248, 253–4, 264–6
61	Chorus, "Natur und Liebe", J. 241
62	Rondo brillante, J. 252 (1819)
63	Trio in G minor for Piano, vc, fl, J. 259 (1819)
64	6 Songs, a Duet, & a Chorus, J. 234, 210, 235, 230, 255, 247, 249, 258
65	Invitation to the Dance, J. 260 (1819)
66	6 Songs, J. 217, 238, 48, 134, 65, 213
67	?
68	6 Partsongs, J. 132, 263, 262, 285, 261, 284
69	?
70	Piano Sonata No. 4 in E minor, J. 287 (1819–22)
71	6 Songs, J. 256, 243, 267, 28, 229, 105
72	Polacca brillante, J. 268 (1819)
73	Clarinet Concerto No. 1 in F minor, J. 114 (1811)
74	Clarinet Concerto No. 2 in E♭ major, J. 118 (1811)
75	Bassoon Concerto in F, J. 127 (1811, revised 22)
75a	Missa sancta No. 1 in E♭ major, J. 224 (1817–18)
76	Missa sancta No. 2 in G, J. 251 (1818–19)
77	Opera, Der Freischütz, J. 277 (1817–21)
78	Incidental music for Preciosa (P. A. Wolff, after Miguel de Cervantes), J. 279 (1820)
79	Konzertstück in F minor for Piano and Orchestra, J. 282 (1821)
80	6 Songs, J. 281, 269, 270, 274, 275, 278
81	Opera, Euryanthe, J. 291 (1822–23)

== By Jähns catalogue number ==
J. (Jähns)	Description
1–6	6 Fughettas, Op. 1 (Piano) [1798]
7	6 Variations in C on an Original Theme, Op. 2 (Piano) [1800]
8	Opera, Peter Schmoll und seine Nachbarn, Op. 8 [1801-2]
9–14	6 petites pièces faciles, Op. 3 (Piano 4-hands) [1801]
15–26	12 allemandes, Op. 4 (pf; No. 11 & 12 for Piano 4-hands) [1801]
27	Song, "Die Kerze" [1802]
28	Song, "Umsonst ensagt ich", Op. 71/4 [1802]
29–34	6 Ecossaises (Piano) [1802]
35	Canon, "Mädchen, ach meide Männerschmeichelei'n", Op. 13/6 (3v) [1802] (used by Mahler in J.Anh. 5)
36	"Ein Gärtchen und ein Häuchen drin" (chorus [STB]) [1803]
37	Grablied (TTB, 9 wind) [1803]
38	Song, "Entfliehet schnell von mir" [1803]
39	Arrangement of vocal score of GJ Vogler's opera Samori [1803]
40	8 Variations sur l'air de ballet de Castor and Pollux, Op. 5 (Piano) [1804]
41	Song, "Ich sah die hingesunken" [1804]
42	Song, "Wiedersehen", Op. 30/1 [1804]
43	6 Variations in C on a theme from Vogler's Samori, Op. 6 (Piano [vn, vc ad lib]) [1804]
44–46	Opera, Rübezahl (3 nos. only) [1804-5]
47	Romanza siciliana in G minor (fl, orch) [1805]
47a	Tusch (20 tpt) [1806]
48	Song, "Ich denke dein", Op. 66/3 [1806]
49	6 Variations in C on "A Schüsserl und a Rein'dl'" (viola, orch) [1806]
50	Symphony No. 1 in C major, Op. 19 [1806-7]
51	Symphony No. 2 in C [1807]
52	Song (with gui. acc.), "Liebeszauber", Op. 13/3 [1807]
53	7 Variations sur l'air "Vien quà, Dorina bella" [by Bianchi], Op. 7 (Piano) [1807]
54	Grande ouverture à plusieurs instruments, Op. 8 (revision of ov. to J. 8) [1807]
55	Thème original varié, Op. 9 (7 variations for Piano) [1808]
56	Momento capriccioso in B♭ major, Op. 12 (Piano) [1808]
57	Song, "Er an Sie", Op. 15/6 [1808]
58	Cantata, "Der erste Ton", Op. 14 (reciter, SATB, orch) [1808, rev. 1810]
59	Grande polonaise in E♭ major, Op. 21 (Piano) [1808]
60	Song (with bc acc.), "Komisches musikalisches Sendschreiben" [1808]
61	9 Variations on a Norwegian air (vn, Piano) [1808]
62	Song, "Meine Farben", Op. 23/1 [1808]
63	Song, "Klage", Op. 15/2 [1808]
64	Grand pot-pourri, Op. 20 (vc, orch) [1808]
65	Song, "Serenade" ("Die Lethe des Lebens"), Op. 66/5 [1809]
66	"Die Lethe des Lebens" (B, chorus, Piano) [1809]
67	Song, "Das Röschen", Op. 15/5 [1809]
68	Song, "Was zieht zu deinem Zauberkreise", Op. 15/4 [1809]
69	"Chorlied" (chorus) [1809]
70	Song, "Rhapsodie" ("Die Blume"), Op. 23/2 [1809]
71	Song, "Romanze" ("Die Ruinen") [1809]
72	Song (with gui. acc.), "Sanftes Licht, weiche nicht", Op. 13/4 [1809]
73	Song, "Meine Lieder, meine Sange", Op. 15/1 [1809]
74	Song, "Der kleine Fritz", Op. 15/3 [1809]
75	Incidental music for Turandot (Schiller, after Gozzi), Op. 37 (ov. & 6 inst. nos.) [1809]
76	Piano Quartet in B♭ major, Op. 18 [1811]
77–78	2 nos. for Haydn pasticcio, Der Freibrief [1809] (77 used by Mahler in J.Anh. 5)
79	Andante e Rondo ungarese in C minor, Op. 35 (viola, orch) (see also J. 158) [1809]
80	Song, "Trinklied" [1809]
81–6	6 pieces, Op. 10a (Piano 4-hands) [1809]
87	Opera, Silvana [1808-10]
88	Canzonetta, "Sicchè t'inganni" (voice, Piano/harp) [1810]
89	Canon, "Die Sonate soll ich spielen" (3v) [1810]
90	Canon, "Canons zu zwei sinc nicht drei" (3v) [1810]
91	Song (with gui. acc.), "Die Schäferstunde" ("Damon und Chloé"), Op. 13/1 [1810]
92	Song, "Das neue Lied" [1810]
93	Recit & Rondo, "Il momento s'avvicina", Op. 16 (S, orch) [1810]
94	Variations in F (vc, orch) [1810]
95	Canon, "Leck mich im Angesicht" (3v) [1810]
96	Song (with gui. acc.), "Wiegenlied", Op. 13/2 [1810]
97	Song (with gui. acc.), "Die Zeit", Op. 13/5 [1810]
98	Piano Concerto No. 1 in C major, Op. 11 [1810]
99–104	6 sonates progressives in F, G, d, E♭, A, C, Op. 10b (vn, Piano) [1810]
105	Song, "Des Künstlers Abshied", Op. 71/6 (v, gui/pf) [1810]
106	Singspiel, Abu Hassan [1810-11]
107	Duet, "Se il mio ben", Op. 31/1 (AA, Clarinet, 2 hn, str) [1811]
108	Canzonetta, "Ah, dove siete", Op. 29/1 (v, gui/pf) [1811]
109	Clarinet Concertino in E♭, Op. 26 [1811]
110–13	4 songs for Der arme Minnesinger (voice, gui) (see Op. 25) [1811]
114	Clarinet Concerto No. 1 in F minor, Op. 73 [1811]
115	Adagio & Rondo in F (harmonium, orch) [1811]
116	Trauer-Musik (Bar, chorus, 10 wind) [1811]
117	Song, "Maienblümlein, so schön", Op. 23/3 [1811]
118	Clarinet Concerto No. 2 in E♭ major, Op. 74 [1811]
119	Melody in F (Clarinet, with Piano accom by FW Jähns) [1811]
120	Canzonetta, "Ch'io mai vi possa", Op. 29/3 (v, gui/pf) [1811]
121	Scena & aria, "Misera me!" Op. 50 (S, orch) [1811]
122	Overture, "Der Beherrscher der Geister" ("Ruler of the Spirits"), Op. 27 [1811]
123	Duet, "Mille volte", Op. 31/2 (SS, Piano) [1811]
124	Canzonetta, "Ninfa se liete", Op. 29/2 (v, gui/pf) [1811]
125	Duet, "Va, ti consola", Op. 31/3 (SS, Piano) [1811]
126	Scena & aria, "Qual altro attendi" (T, chorus, orch) [1812]
127	Bassoon Concerto in F, Op. 75 [1811, rev. 1822]
128	7 Variations on a theme from Silvana, Op. 33 (Clarinet, Piano) [1811]
129	Song, "Romanze" ("Wiedersehen") [1812]
130	Song, "Sonett", Op. 23/4 [1812]
131	"Lenz erwacht, und Nachtigallen" (STB, chorus [STB], Piano) [1812]
132	"Das Turnierbankett", Op. 68/1 (TTB, male chorus) [1812] (used by Mahler in J.Anh. 5)
133	"An eine Freundin", Op. 23/6 (chorus [STTB], Piano) [1812]
134	Song, "Lebensansicht", Op. 66/4 [1812]
135	"Schwäbisches Tanzlied" (chorus [STTBB], Piano) [1812]
136	"Heisse, stille Liebe schwebet", Op. 23/5 (chorus [STTB], Piano) [1812]
137	Song, "Bettlerlied", Op. 25/4 (v, gui/pf) [1812]
138	Piano Sonata No. 1 in C major, Op. 24 [1812]
139	"Kriegs-Eid" (unison male vv, 2 tpt, 3 hn, bsn, trombone) [1812]
140	Song, "Liebeglühen", Op. 25/1 (v, gui/pf) [1812]
141	7 Variations on "A peine au sortir de l'enfance" from Méhul's opera Joseph, Op. 28 (Piano) [1812]
142	Scena & aria, "Signor, se padre sei", Op. 53a (T, 2 choruses, orch) [1812]
143–8	6 Favorite Waltzes of the Queen of France, Marie Louise (Piano) [1812]
149	Waltz (fl, 2 Clarinet, 2 hn, tpt,2 bsn) [1812]
150–53	4 songs by Duke Leopold August of Gotha, accompaniments arr. for winds [1812]
154	Hymn, "In seiner Ordnung schafft der Herr", Op. 36 (SATB, chorus, orch) [1812]
155	Piano Concerto No. 2 in E♭ major, Op. 32 [1812]
156	Song, "Sind es Schmerzen", Op. 30/6 [1813]
157	Song, "Unbefangenheit", Op. 30/3 [1813]
158	Andante e Rondo ungarese in c (bsn, orch) (rev. of J. 79) [1813]
159	Song, "Reigen", Op. 30/5 [1813]
160	Song, "Minnelied", Op. 30/4 [1813]
161	Song, "Es stürmt auf der Flur", Op. 30/2 [1814]
162–3	2 pieces arr. & orch'd for use in Fischer's Singspiel Die Verwandlungen [1814]:
162	J. Weigl's duet, "Ein jeder Geck"
163	anon. arietta, "Ihr holden Blumen"
164	Canon, "Zu dem Reich der Töne schweben" (4v) [1814]
165	"Lebenslied am Geburtstage" (4 male vv, Piano) [1814]
166	Song, "Gebet um die Geliebte", Op. 47/6 [1814]
167	Canon, "Scheiden und leiden uist einerlei" (4v) [1814]
168–73	"Leyer und Schwert", Op. 42 (6 male choruses) [1814]:
168	No. 2, "Lützows wilde Jagd"
169	No. 6, "[[Schwertlied]]"
170	No. 4, "Männer und Buben"
171	No. 5, "Trinklied vor der Schlacht"
172	No. 1, "Reiterlied"
173	No. 3, "Gebet vor der Schlacht"
174–7	Song cycle, "Leyer und Schwert", Op. 41 [1814]
178	Scena, "Ah, se Edmondo", Op. 57 (for Méhul's opera, Héléna) [1815]
179	Air russe (Schöne Minka), 9 Variations, Op. 40 (Piano) [1815]
180	"Drei Knäbchen lieblich austaffiret" (burlesque on Mozart's Magic Flute) (male vv) [1815]
181	Scena & aria, "Non paventar mia vita", Op. 51 (S, orch) [1815]
182	Clarinet Quintet in B♭ major, Op. 34 [1815]
183–4	2 songs for A. Fischer's Singspiel, Der travestierte Aeneas [1815] (183 used by Mahler in J.Anh. 5; 184 revised as J. 185)
185	Deutscher (Original-Walzer) in D (orch) (rev. of J. 184) [1815]
186–7	2 songs in "Lieb und Versöhnen" [1815]
188	Horn Concertino in E minor, Op. 45 (1st version lost) [1806, rev. 1815]
189	Ballad, "Was stürmet", Op. 47/3 (Bar, harp) [1815]
190	Cantata, "KamPiano und Sieg", Op. 44 (SATB, chorus, orch) [1815]
191	Tedesco in D (orch) [1816]
192	Song, "Der Jüngling und die Spröde", Op. 47/4 [1816]
193	Canon, "Weil Maria Töne hext" (3v) [1816]
194	Arietta for Das Sternenmädchen in Maidlinger Walde (text lost) [1816]
195	Romance, "Ein König einst gefangen sass" (voice, gui) [1816]
196	Song, "Mein Verlangen", Op. 47/5 [1816]
197	Song, "Die gefangenen Sänger", Op. 47/1 [1816]
198	Song, "Die freien Sänger", Op. 47/2 [1816]
199	Piano Sonata No. 2 in A♭ major, Op. 39 [1816]
200–03	Song cycle, "Die Temperamente beim Verluste der Geliebten", Op. 46 [1816]
204	Grand duo concertant in E♭ major, Op. 48 (Clarinet, Piano) [1815-16]
205	Songs, "Bei der Musik des Prinzen Louis Ferdinand von Preussen", Op. 43 [1816]
206	Piano Sonata No. 3 in D minor, Op. 49 [1816]
207	Divertimento assai facile (gui, Piano) [1816]
208	Duet, "Abschied: O Berlin, ich muss dich lassen", Op. 54/4 (2v, Piano) [1817]
209	Duet, "Quodlibet: So geht es in Schnützelputz-Häusel", Op. 54/2 (2v, Piano) [1817]
210	Duet, "Mailied: Tra, ri, ro!" Op. 64/2 (2v, Piano) [1817]
211	Song, "Alte Weiber", Op. 54/3 [1817]
212	Song, "Liebeslied", Op. 54/2 [1817]
213	Song, "Wunsch und Entsagung", Op. 66/6 [1817]
214	Incidental music for König Yngurd (A. Müllner; 10 inst. nos., 1 song) [1817]
215–16	Orchestrations of 2 pieces for inclusion in Méhul's opera Héléna [1817]:
215	F. Paer's recit & cavatina, "Von dir entfernt"
216	S. Nasolini's recit & duet, "Ja, Liebe"
217	Song, "Das Veilchen im Tale", Op./ 66/1 [1817]
218	"Zwei Kränze zum Annen-Tage", Op. 53b (4 male vv, Piano) [1817]
219	7 Variationen [in C] über ein Zigeunerlied, Op. 40 (Piano) [1817]
220	Incidental music for Donna Diana (C. A. West [J. Schreyvogel], after A. Moretto; 6 nos.) [1817]
221	Cantata, "L'accoglienza" (SSSTBB, chorus, orch) [1817]
222	Song, "Hold ist der Zyanenkranz" (solo vv, chorus) [1817]
223	Romance, "Leise weht es" (used by Mahler in J.Anh. 5) [1818]
224	Missa sancta No. 1 in E♭ major, Op. 75a (SATB, chorus, orch) [1817-18]
225	Song, "Sei gegrüsst, Frau Sonne, mir" [1818]
226	Offertory, "Gloria et honore" (S, chorus, orch) (for J. 224) [1818]
227	Dance & Song, "In Provence" (T, chorus) (spurious?) [1818]
228	"Schöne Ahnung ist erglommen" (4 male vv, Piano) [1818]
229	Song, "Lied der Hirtin", Op. 71/5 [1818]
230	Song, "Gelahrtheit", Op. 64/4 [1818]
231	Song, "Weine, weine", Op. 54/7 [1818]
232	Song, "Die fromme Magd", Op. 54/1 [1818]
233	Song, "Wenn ich ein Vöglein wár", Op. 54/6 [1818]
234	Song, "Mein Schatzerl ist hübsch", Op. 64/1 [1818]
235	Song, "Heimlicher Liebe Pein", Op. 64/3 [1818]
236	Moderato, Op. 60/1 (Piano 4-hands) [1818]
237	Incidental music for Heinrich IV, König von Frankenreich (E. Gehe; 8 inst. nos.) [1818]
238	Song, "Rosen im Haare", Op. 66/2 [1818]
239	Scena & aria for Cherubini's Lodoiska, "Was sag ich?" Op. 56 [1818]
240	Chorus, "Heil dir, Sappho" (SSB, wind, perc) [1818]
241	"Natur und Liebe", Op. 61 (chorus [SSTTBB], Piano) [1818]
242	Allegro, Op. 60/2 (Piano 4-hands) [1818]
243	Song, "Ein Mädchen ging", Op. 71/2 (voice, Piano/gui) [1818]
244	Jubel-Kantate, Op. 58 (SATB, chorus, orch) [1818]
245	Jubel-Ouverture in E major, Op. 59 [1818]
246	Incidental music for Lieb' um Liebe (Rublack; 6 nos.) [1818]
247	"God Save the King", arr. male chorus [?1818]
248	Adagio, Op. 60/3 (Piano 4-hands) [1818]
249	"Ei, ei, ei, wie scheint der Mond so hell", Op. 64/7 (male vv) [1818]
250	Offertory, "In die solemnitatis" (S, chorus, orch) (for J. 251) [1818]
251	Missa sancta No. 2 in G, "Jubelmesse", Op. 76 (SATB, chorus, orch) [1818-19]
252	Rondo brillante in E♭ major, "La gaîté", Op. 62 (Piano) [1819]
253	Allegro – tutto ben marcato, Op. 60/4 (Piano 4-hands) [1819]
254	Alla siciliana, Op. 60/5 (Piano 4-hands) [1819]
255	Song, "Abendsegen", Op. 64/5 [1819]
256	Song, "Triolett", Op. 71/1 (used by Mahler in J.Anh. 5) [1819]
257	Song, "Liebesgruss aus der Ferne", Op. 64/6 [1819]
258	Song, "Herzchen, mein Schätzchen", Op. 64/8 [1819]
259	Trio in G minor for fl, vc, Piano, Op. 63 [1819]
260	Aufforderung zum Tanz (Invitation to the Dance): Rondo brilliant in D♭, Op. 65 (Piano) [1819]
261	Partsong, "Gute Nacht", Op. 68/5 (4 male vv) [1819]
262	Partsong, "Freiheitslied", Op., 68/3 (4 male vv) [1819]
263	Partsong, "Ermunterung", Op. 68/2 (4 male vv) [1819]
264	Tema variato ("Ich hab' mir Eins erwählet"), Op. 60/6 (Piano 4-hands) [1819]
265	Marcia, Op. 60/7 (Piano 4-hands) [1819]
266	Rondo, Op. 60/8 (Piano 4-hands) [1819]
267	Song, "Das Mädchen an das erste Schneeglöckchen", Op. 71/3 [1819]
268	Polacca brillante in E major, "L'hilarité", Op. 72 (Piano) [1819]
269	Song, "Sehnsucht" ("Weihnachtslied"), Op. 80/2 [1818]
270	Song, "Elfenlied", Op. 80/3 [1819]
271	Music for ceremonial prologue (including song, "Du hohe Rautenzeig", to melody of "God Save the King") (chorus, 6 wind) [1819]
272	Double canon (4v) [1819]
273	Agnus Dei (SSA, wind) [1820]
274	Song, "Schmerz", Op. 80/4 [1820]
275	Song, "An sie", Op. 80/5 [1820]
276	Incidental music for Der Leuchtturm (E. von Houwald; 4 harp nos.) [1820]
277	Opera, Der Freischütz, Op. 77 [1817-21]
278	Song, "Der Sänger und der Maler", Op. 80/6 [1820]
279	Incidental music for Preciosa (P. A. Wolff, after Miguel de Cervantes), Op. 78 (ov., 11 nos.) [1820]
280	Song for The Merchant of Venice, "Sagt, woher" (women's vv, gui) [1821]
281	Song, "Lied von Clotilde", Op. 80/1 [1821]
282	Konzertstück in F minor, Op. 79 (pf, orch) [1821]
283	Cantata, "Du, bekränzt unsre Laren" (SSTB, chorus, fl, Piano) [1821]
284	Partsong, "Husarenlied", Op. 68/6 (4 male vv) [1821]
285	Partsong, "Schlummerlied", Op. 68/4 (4 male vv) [1822]
286	Song, "Das Licht im Tale" [1822]
287	Piano Sonata No. 4 in E minor, Op. 70 [1819-22]
288	Marcia vivace (10 tpt) [1822]
289	Incidental music for "Den Sachsensohn vermählet heute" (ov., 5 choral nos.) (one used by Mahler in J.Anh. 5) [1822]
290	Cantata, "Wo nehm ich Blumen her" (chorus [STB], Piano) [1823]
291	Opera, Euryanthe, Op. 81 [1822-3]
292	Song (Romance), "Elle était simple et gentilette" (used by Mahler in J.Anh. 5) [1824]
293	"Reiterlied" (4 male vv, Piano ad lib) [1825]
294	"Schützenweihe" (4 male vv, Piano ad lib) [1825]
295ff	10 schottische Nationalgesänge (10 Scottish Folksongs), acc. arr. fl, vn, vc, Piano [1825]:
295	"The soothing shades of gloaming"
296	"The Troubadour"
297	"O poortith cauld"
298	"Bonny Dundee"
299	"Yes, thou may'st walk"
300	"A soldier am I"
301	"John Anderson, my jo'"
302	"O my love's like the red, red rose"
303	"Robin is my joy"
304	"Whar' hae ye been a' day"
305	Arioso & recit for Spontini's Olympie, "Doch welche Töne" [1825]
306	Opera, Oberon [1825-6]
307	March (wind) (rev. of J. 13 with new trio; also arr. chorus, orch as "Zu den Fluren des heimischen Herdes") [1826]
308	Song, "Gesang der Nurmahal: From Chindara's warbling fount I come" (Piano part reconstructed by Moscheles) [1826]
Anh. 1	Opera, Das Waldmädchen [1800]
Anh. 3	"Deo rosa" (incomplete) (4 male vv, Piano) [1821]
Anh. 5	Opera, Die drei Pintos (unfinished; completed by Mahler, 1888) [1820-4]
Anh. 6	Singspiel, Die Macht der Liebe und des Weins (lost) [1798]
Anh. 8	Mass in E♭ major, "Grosse Jugendmesse" (SATB, chorus, orchestra, organ) [1802]
Anh. 67–70	4 solfèges [1818]
–	Miscellaneous: Song, "Strafpredigt über die französische Musik" [1801]; Canon, "An die Hoffnung" (3v, Piano ad lib) [1802]; Canon, "Wenn du in Armen der Liebe" [1802]; Canon, "Prost Neujahr!" (34 vv, 74 tpt!!) [1811]; Introduction, theme & variations (Clarinet, Piano) (rediscovered 1943) [?1811]; Song, "Vatergruss" [1823]

== See also ==
- List of operas by Carl Maria von Weber
