= Bassoon Concerto (Weber) =

1811 concerto by Carl Maria von Weber

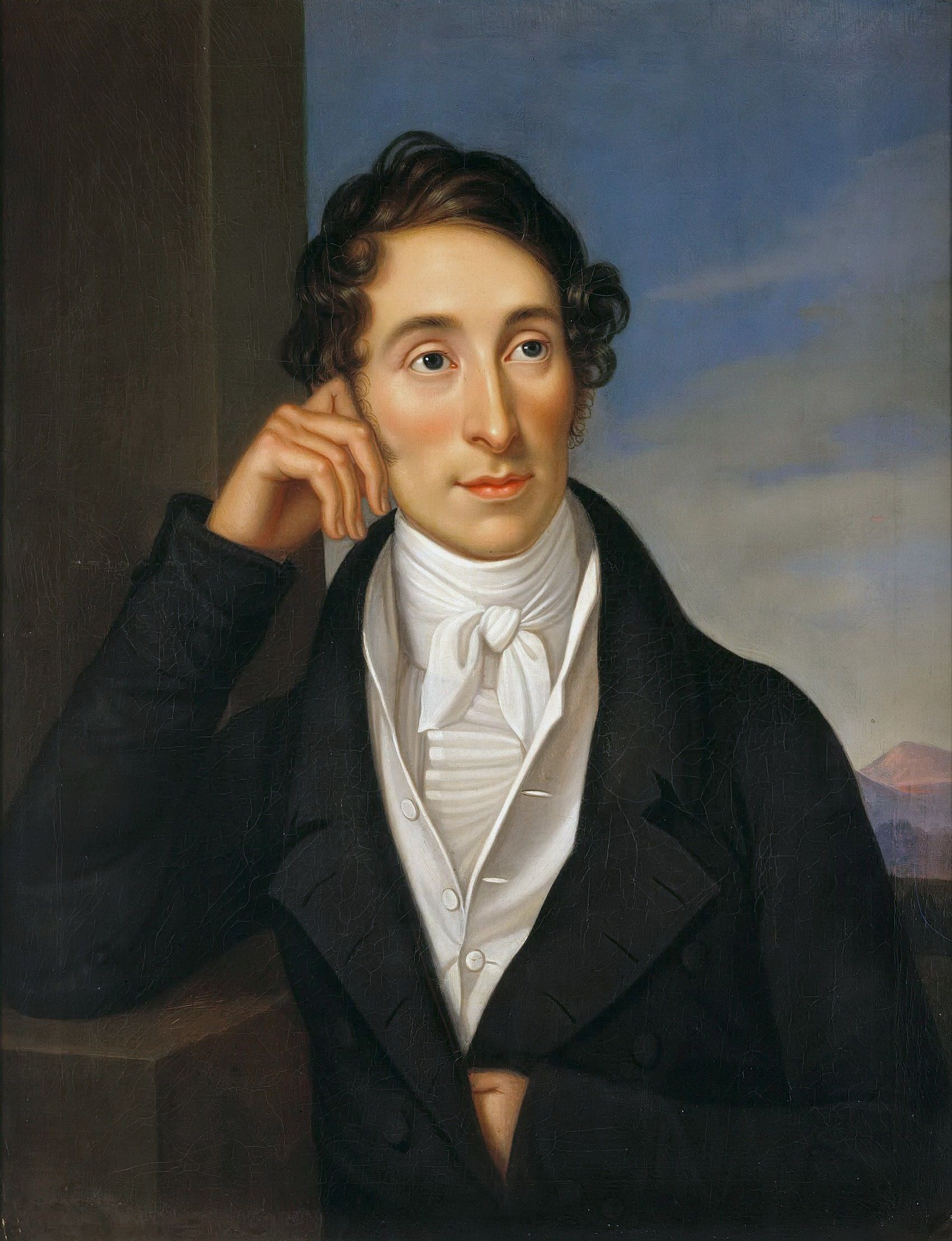
Carl Maria von Weber (1821) Painting by Caroline Bardua

Carl Maria von Weber's Concerto for Bassoon in F major, Op. 75 (J. 127) was composed in 1811 for Munich court musician Georg Friedrich Brandt, was premiered on December 28, 1811, and then revised in 1822. Primarily an opera conductor and composer, Weber had only arrived a few months earlier in Munich, where he was extremely well received. The concerto is one of two pieces written for bassoon by Weber, the other being Andante e Rondo Ungarese, Op. 35 (J. 158). A typical performance lasts 18–20 minutes.

This work and the Mozart Bassoon Concerto are the two concertos most often played in the bassoon repertoire. William Waterhouse asserts, "The bassoon concerto by Weber ranks second only to that of Mozart in importance." The concertos by Mozart and Weber were in the repertoire used for the famous playing exams at the Paris Conservatoire, along with newly commissioned works by French composers.

== Instrumentation ==
The concerto is scored for solo bassoon and an orchestra consisting of two flutes, two oboes, two horns, two bassoons, two trumpets, timpani, and strings.

== History ==
In February 1811, Weber embarked on an international concert tour that was to include such cities as Munich, Prague, Dresden, Berlin, Copenhagen, and St. Petersburg. It was on March 14 that he arrived in Munich, the first city of the tour. There he composed the clarinet Concertino, Op. 26 (J. 109) for Heinrich Bärmann, a well-respected virtuoso clarinetist in the Munich court orchestra who would become a lifelong friend. The Concertino was wildly popular, which caused Maximilian I, the king of Bavaria, immediately to commission from Weber two full clarinet concertos (No. 1 in F minor, Op. 73: J. 114 and No. 2 in E♭ major, Op. 74: J. 118). Many musicians of the court orchestra begged Weber to write concertos for them as well, but the only one who convinced him was the bassoonist Georg Friedrich Brandt. A student of the famous soloist Georg Wenzel Ritter (Mozart's favorite bassoonist), Brandt convinced the King to commission a bassoon concerto from Weber.

The concerto was written from November 14 to 27, 1811. Brandt played the premiere in the Munich Hoftheater on December 28, 1811, but Weber had already left for Switzerland, the next destination on his concert tour. Brandt had the opportunity to perform the concerto three more times, in Vienna (December 27, 1812), Prague (February 19, 1813), and Ludwigslust (March 21, 1817). Weber was able to attend the concert in Prague, and before he sent the concerto to the Berlin publisher Schlesinger in 1822, he made revisions as a result of this hearing. Around 40 years following the 1823 publication, Schlesinger released a heavily edited edition for bassoon and piano which obscured the composition with new articulations, altered notes, added dynamics and misprints. Bassoonist and pedagogue William Waterhouse wrote a scholarly article in 1986 comparing all editions and detailing the changes Weber made in his 1822 revision, and then Waterhouse prepared and edited the Urtext edition in 1990, bringing back to light all of the composer's original intentions.

According to John Warrack, the title of the first printed copy read "Primo Concerto", but no second concerto followed, unless one counts the Andante e Rondo Ungarese, which was originally written for viola.

== Movements ==
The concerto consists of three movements in the standard fast-slow-fast pattern:

1. Allegro ma non troppo (F major)
2. Adagio (B♭ major)
3. Rondo: Allegro (F major)

=== I. Allegro ma non troppo ===
Movement I, first theme
Movement I, second theme

In the key of F major, this first movement is in the classical sonata form (also known as first movement form) and carries the time signature 4/4. It begins with an orchestral tutti introduction, wherein fragments of the first theme and most of the second theme are stated. The composer's harmonic language is simplistic, focusing heavily on dominants and tonics. Chiefly a composer and conductor of operas, Weber had a flair for the theatrical, which he used to great effect to introduce the soloist by the orchestra. At the end of the introduction the orchestra plays five measures of a cadential six-four while raising a massive crescendo from piano to fortissimo, lands on a root-position dominant seventh chord, then drops out, leaving a solo timpani playing the tonic F at a pianissimo for two measures of alternating eighth notes and eighth rests, creating what Waterhouse calls "theatrical expectancy." The bassoon enters triumphantly with the first full statement of the movement's militaristic first theme. This heightened sense of drama is a compositional trait often associated with Weber.

Weber's talent for characterization is well suited to a piece featuring the bassoon. The bassoon is capable of a wide range of characters and emotions, and in his concerto Weber captures them all. While the first theme is cocky and triumphant (aided by the dotted rhythm), the second theme, marked dolce, is calm and reflective. Mercurial mood shifts pervade the movement, with markings of brillante, dolce, con fuoco, dolce again, and a brillante for the dramatic finish. Friedrich Wilhelm Jähns, the man who catalogued all of Weber's known works (giving us J numbers in addition to opus numbers), states in his catalog that the qualities evoked in this movement are seriousness, dignity, and power.

Using any technique he can to heighten drama and showcase the virtuosity of the soloist, Weber quickly alternates between notes in very low and very high registers, and right before the flashy arpeggios, scales and trills that lead to the final cadence, the bassoon ascends dramatically to a high D (D5), then the highest note a bassoon could reach. The modern bassoon can play higher, but not without great effort.

The issue of Classical versus Romantic styles should be addressed. In his article entitled "The Romantic Spirit in Music," Edward J. Dent expresses the view that, "We should all unhesitatingly agree that Weber is the first of the great Romantics." Whether or not one agrees with Dent, and if Weber is a Romantic composer, why then does he use Classical forms for the two clarinet concertos and the bassoon concerto? The answer according to John Warrack is that Weber thought it best to avoid innovation in these royal commissions, thinking "effectiveness within understood forms a more certain passport to success." Weber actually disliked and struggled with sonata form, finding it to be a limit on his creativity rather than a conduit through which his creativity could flow. His first movements tend to not match the other two, probably because he dreaded writing them and often composed them last. Warrack finds the following difference between Ludwig van Beethoven’s and Weber’s treatment of sonata form:

However lofty and far-reaching the extensions Beethoven made, however profoundly he matched it, from the Eroica Symphony right on to the last quartets, to the infinitely varied expression of a new movement of the human spirit, sonata was for him the natural inheritance, the source from which the vast river of his invention might swell. With Weber we immediately sense a lack of belief in the form.

Weber so disliked conventional standard sonata cycles that sometimes he omitted the first movement altogether. This is how Warrack explains the seemingly odd form of Andante e Rondo Ungarese: the Andante and Rondo are the attacca second and third movements of a concerto without a first movement. A more likely explanation for the form of that work, however, is that Weber followed the cabaletta form that was so standard in arias of the day. Perhaps this less rigid slow-fast form better catered to Weber’s Romantic spirit.

=== II. Adagio ===
Movement II, main theme

Operatic lyricism saturates this movement, which is in the subdominant B♭ major and in 3/8 time. Composed first, the slow movement reminds one strongly of Italian opera. Of the Adagio, Waterhouse says, "The theatrical atmosphere is maintained by an almost operatic cantilena, which should be compared with certain slow soprano arias from his operas." The melody could easily be sung and is arguably one of the most beautiful melodies written for the solo bassoon. Characteristic of Weber's compositional style in general is his frequent use of the appoggiatura. According to Dent, this is one of Weber's "two favourite mannerisms," the other being the dotted rhythm featured heavily in the first movement. The appoggiatura began as a nuance to express great emotion when singing, so it is appropriate and moving in its use here. Weber was also adept at experimenting with timbre and color in his orchestration. In a middle section of this movement, the solo bassoon plays in a three part texture with two horns, and the sound is unusual but striking. The movement ends with the work's only cadenza, which is decidedly operatic and which Weber wrote himself.

=== III. Rondo: Allegro ===
Movement III, main theme

The final movement returns to F major and is a lighthearted rondo in 2/4 time. The main theme is impish and catchy, which makes it easy to identify when it appears many times later in the movement. We return to the mercurial mood swings of the first movement, alternating dolce and con fuoco sections like before, but with the new markings espressivo and scherzando as well. Jähns names humor as the governing quality of this movement. Perhaps the most interesting moment is the transition before the third iteration of the opening theme. Of this spot, Waterhouse states that "devices such as augmentation, fragmentation, [and] hesitation make this return to the main theme perhaps the most witty section of the entire work." At the end of the piece after the final statement of the theme, the bassoonist engages in a flurry of scales and arpeggios, showing off in one of the bassoon repertoire's flashiest and most virtuosic finales.
