= A-flat major =

Major scale based on A♭

- Relative key: F minor
- Parallel key: A-flat minor
- Dominant key: E-flat major
- Subdominant key: D-flat major

Component pitches
- A♭, B♭, C, D♭, E♭, F, G

A-flat major is a major scale based on A♭, with the pitches A♭, B♭, C, D♭, E♭, F, and G. Its key signature has four flats.

The A-flat major scale is:

The A-flat harmonic major and melodic major scales are

Its relative minor is F minor. Its parallel minor, A-flat minor, would require seven flats and is usually written as the enharmonic key of G-sharp minor instead, with five sharps.

In tuning systems where the number of notes per octave is not a multiple of 12, notes such as G♯ and A♭ are not enharmonically equivalent, nor are the corresponding key signatures. These tunings can produce keys with no analogue in 12-tone equal temperament, possibly requiring double sharps, double flats, or microtonal alterations in key signatures.

== Scale degree chords ==
The scale degree chords of A-flat major are:

- Tonic – A-flat major
- Supertonic – B-flat minor
- Mediant – C minor
- Subdominant – D-flat major
- Dominant – E-flat major
- Submediant – F minor
- Leading-tone – G diminished

== Compositions in A-flat major ==
Beethoven chose A-flat major as the key of the slow movement for most of his C minor works, a practice which Anton Bruckner imitated in his first two C minor symphonies and also Antonín Dvořák in his only C minor symphony. The second movement of Haydn's 43rd symphony in E-flat major is in A-flat major. Frédéric Chopin used this key in many of his works, particularly in his waltzes.

Since A-flat major was rarely chosen as the main key for orchestral works of the 18th century, passages or movements in the key often retained the timpani settings of the preceding movement. For example, Beethoven's Symphony No. 5 has the timpani set to C and G for the first movement. With hand-tuned timpani, there is no time to re-tune the timpani to A-flat and E-flat for the slow second movement in A-flat major; accordingly, the timpani in this movement are reserved for the passages in C major. In Bruckner's Symphony No. 1 in C minor, however, the timpani are re-tuned between the first movement in C minor and the following in A-flat major.

Charles-Marie Widor considered A-flat major to be the second best key for flute music.

A-flat major was the flattest major key to be used as the home key for the keyboard and piano sonatas of Domenico Scarlatti, Joseph Haydn and Ludwig van Beethoven, with each of them using the key for two sonatas: Scarlatti's K. 127 and K. 130, Haydn's Hob XVI 43 and 46, and Beethoven's Op. 26 and Op. 110, while Franz Schubert used it for one piano sonata. It was also the flattest major key to be used for the preludes and fugues in Johann Sebastian Bach's Well-Tempered Clavier, as flatter major keys were notated as their enharmonic equivalents.

Felix Mendelssohn, Johann Nepomuk Hummel, John Field, and Friedrich Kalkbrenner each wrote one piano concerto in A-flat (Mendelssohn's being for two pianos); they had the horns and trumpet tuned to E-flat. Max Bruch's Concerto for Two Pianos in A-flat minor has its last movement in A-flat major, which is the parallel major; this concerto plays with the contrast between the two keys.

Scott Joplin's Maple Leaf Rag is also written in A-flat major (the trio part of the composition is written in D-flat major).

Other compositions in A-flat major include:

- Ludwig van Beethoven
  - Piano Sonata No. 12
  - Piano Sonata No. 31
- Carl Maria von Weber
  - Piano Sonata No. 2
- Frédéric Chopin
  - Polonaise-Fantaisie, Op. 61
  - "Heroic" Polonaise, Op. 53
  - Ballade No. 3, Op. 47
  - Étude Op. 10 No. 10
  - Étude Op. 25 No. 1
  - Trois nouvelles études, No. 2
  - Nocturne Op. 32 No. 2
  - Prelude Op. 28 No. 17
  - Waltz Op. 34 No. 1
  - Waltz Op. 42
  - Waltz Op. 64 No. 3
  - Waltz, Op. 69, No. 1
  - Mazurka Op. 59 No. 2
  - Mazurka Op. 50 No. 2
  - Impromptu No. 1, Op. 29
- Antonín Dvořák
  - String Quartet No. 14
- Edward Elgar
  - Symphony No. 1
- Franz Liszt
  - Transcendental Étude No. 9, "Ricordanza"
  - Au Lac de Wallenstadt, Au bord d'une source and Eglogue from Années de Pèlerinage No. 1
  - Sonetto 123 del Petrarca from Années de Pèlerinage No. 2
  - Liebesträume No. 1 and 3
  - Feuilles d'Album
  - Élégie sur des motifs du Prince Louis Ferdinand de Prusse, S. 168
- Felix Mendelssohn
  - Second Concerto for Two Pianos and Orchestra
  - Lieder ohne Worte, Op. 38/6 and Op. 53/1
- Ferdinand Ries
  - Piano concerto no. 8 Op. 151, Gruß an den Rhein
- Franz Schubert
  - Mass No. 5 D 678
  - Piano Sonata D 557
  - Impromptu Op. 90/4 (D 899/4) and Op. 142/2 (D 935/2)
- Dmitri Shostakovich
  - String Quartet No. 10, Op. 118

== See also ==
- Key (music)
- Major and minor
- Chord (music)
- Chord notation
- G sharp major

No.	Flats		Sharps	
No.	Major	minor	Major	minor
0	C	a	C	a
1	F	d	G	e
2	B♭	g	D	b
3	E♭	c	A	f♯
4	A♭	f	E	c♯
5	D♭	b♭	B	g♯
6	G♭	e♭	F♯	d♯
7	C♭	a♭	C♯	a♯
8	F♭	d♭	G♯	e♯
