= Concerto for Piano, Violin and Strings (Mendelssohn) =

1823 composition by Felix Mendelssohn

- by Felix Mendelssohn
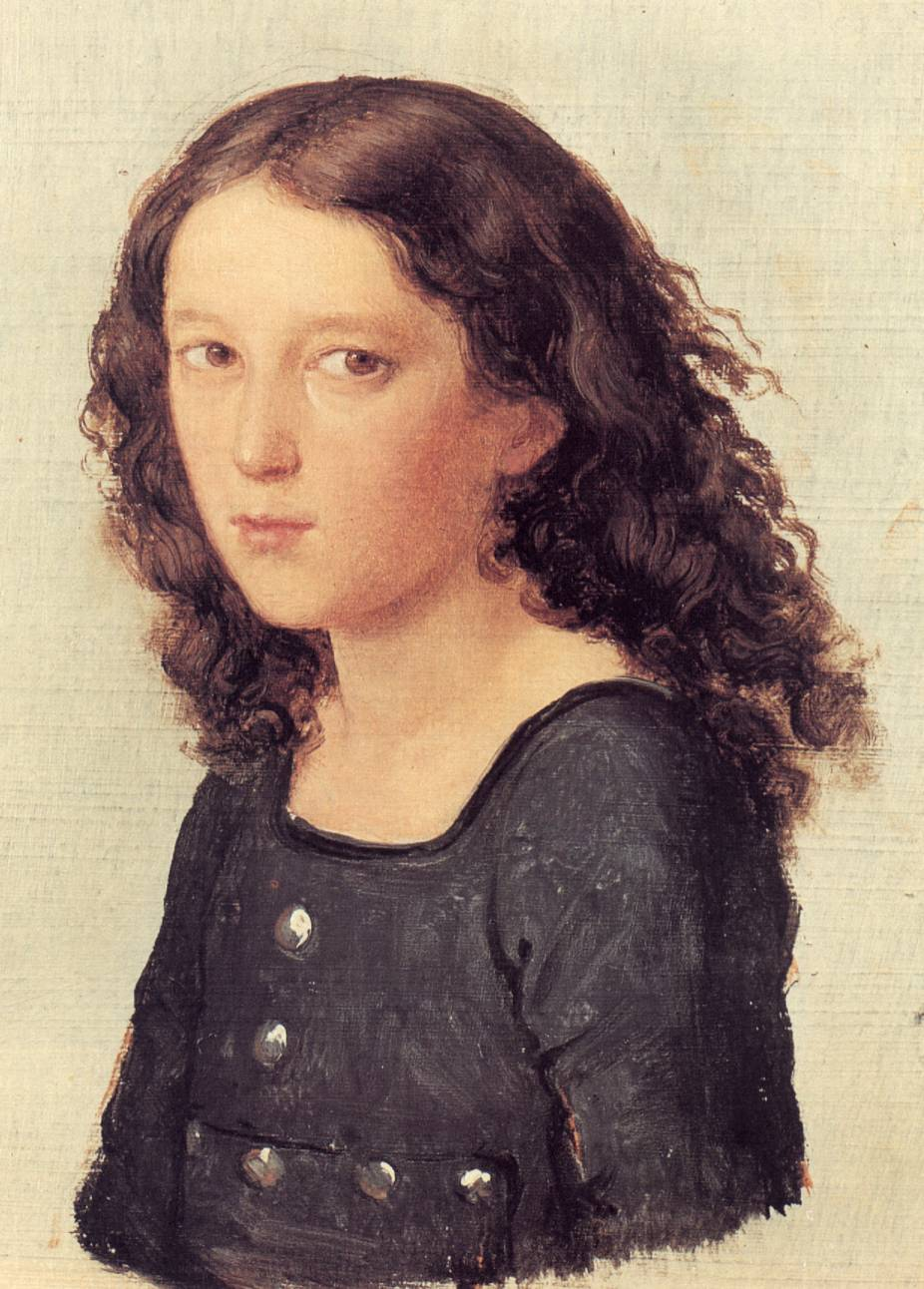
- Mendelssohn in 1821, age 12
- Key: D minor
- Catalogue: MWV O 4
- Period: Romantic
- Genre: Concerto
- Composed: 1823
- Movements: 3
- Scoring: Piano, violin solo, strings (original), winds, timpani (revised)

Premiere
- Date: May 25, 1823

The Concerto for Piano, Violin, and Strings in D minor, MWV O4, also known as the Double Concerto in D minor, was written in 1823 by Felix Mendelssohn when he was 14 years old. This piece is Mendelssohn's fourth work for a solo instrument with orchestral accompaniment, preceded by a Largo and Allegro in D minor for piano and strings MWV O1, the Piano Concerto in A minor MWV O2, and the Violin Concerto in D minor MWV O3.

Mendelssohn composed the work to be performed for a private concert on May 25, 1823 at the Mendelssohn home in Berlin with his violin teacher and friend, Eduard Rietz. Following this private performance, Mendelssohn revised the scoring, adding winds and timpani and is possibly the first work in which Mendelssohn used winds and timpani in a large work. A public performance was given on July 3, 1823 at the Berlin Schauspielhaus. Like the A minor piano concerto (1822), it remained unpublished during Mendelssohn's lifetime and it wasn't until 1999 when a critical edition of the piece was available.

== Structure ==
Several works by different composers influenced Mendelssohn's composition of this piece. It is likely that Mendelssohn drew this unusual pairing of solo piano and violin from Johann Hummel's own Concerto for Piano, Violin, and Orchestra in G major, Op. 17, with whom he had briefly studied in 1821. The young Mendelssohn was also influenced by Carl Maria von Weber and frequently performed his Konzertstück in F minor. Mendelssohn's appreciation for Viotti, Rode, and Kreutzer (master pedagogues developed the French Method of violin technique) is evident in his writing for the solo violin.

Techniques used include portato, slurred staccato, and figures that suggest portamento. Mendelssohn's concerto is similar in structure to Weber's Piano Concerto No. 2, Op. 32. From Mendelssohn's own works, the use of just a string section as orchestral accompaniment is reminiscent of his String Symphonies, twelve of which he had written by the end of the year under the influence of C.P.E. Bach's Sinfonias.

There are three movements:

1. Allegro (D minor)
2. Adagio (A major)
3. Allegro molto (D minor)

=== I. Allegro ===
The Allegro movement is in the traditional concerto sonata-allegro form of the Classical era and is somewhat modeled on the Baroque ritornello concerto, with alternating tuttis and solo sections. It begins with an orchestral tutti that presents the themes that will be expanded upon throughout the movement. The main theme is reminiscent of Bach's style and recalls the Baroque era, with contrapuntal texture and a clear harmonic structure. It also seems to reflect the various counterpoint exercises given to Mendelssohn by his composition mentor, Carl Friedrich Zelter.

Following the first theme, the second theme is introduced in F major and is very lyrical, with hints of Romanticism. As the second theme ends, Mendelssohn returns to the strict counterpoint of the first theme. As the orchestra approaches a soft cadence, the piano solo abruptly begins with an arpeggio marked più Lento. The violin solo enters and mimics the piano, and both instruments play together in harmony. After a short transition to F major filled with running passages and demanding arpeggios from both soli, the second theme begins. The violin has the melody while the piano plays a lyrical accompaniment figure. The second theme explores various keys and returns right back to F major as it comes to an end. The orchestra takes over shortly and the solo instruments enter again, mimicking each other in an incredibly balanced duo, closing the exposition.

After a lyrical orchestral tutti that explores many different keys, the development section begins. However, unlike a typical Classical era concerto, the development begins with a recitative section in D♭ major without orchestral accompaniment. This recitative section clearly alludes to Mozart's operas, with the violin singing as a soprano and the piano mimicking orchestral tremolo. It was possibly inspired by a similar passage in Weber's Grand Duo Concertant for clarinet and piano (1817). As the recitative section ends, the tempo picks up and the orchestra re-enters. The rest of the development contains sequences of octave passages and arpeggios from the piano, demanding string-crossings from the solo violin, and virtuosic sixteenth-note passages from both instruments.

The recapitulation includes a restatement of the opening sequence, this time with the second theme in D major and ending in D minor. The movement ends with a highly virtuosic cadenza that Mendelssohn had written himself. In the cadenza, both instruments play a combination of lyrical melodies and difficult counterpoint that comes to a riveting end. In Mendelssohn's manuscript, he had written an alternate cadenza.

=== II. Adagio ===
This movement is in ternary form and in A major, the dominant major of D minor. The orchestral tutti begins with a beautiful melody, foreshadowing the style of Mendelssohn's "Songs Without Words" written six years later. The soloists then enter, the piano first and violin following, both treating and ornamenting the main theme in their own way while the orchestra remains silent. In the middle section, the violin plays the main theme while the piano has accompaniment figures, both exploring different keys. Finally, the orchestra returns with the primary theme and the soloists close the movement peacefully.

=== III. Allegro molto ===
The final movement, Allegro molto, is a rondo in D minor that begins with the piano introducing the primary theme accompanied by difficult leaps in the bass. The solo violin then enters, echoing the piano until the orchestra begins with a fiery tutti in unison. The soloists enter a virtuosic interplay of rapid sixteenth note passages and thematic exchange until suddenly, the piano introduces a chorale à la Bach. The solo violin takes the chorale melody while the orchestra and the piano play counterpoint underneath.

Following the chorale, an exploration of various keys occurs with the piano playing double octaves while the solo violin playing difficult double-stops. Again, the chorale melody is reintroduced, this time in D major. D minor returns with the soloists playing fast passages, difficult double-stops, and double octaves. The orchestra joins in with explosive chords and the piece ends with intensity and virtuosity. The concerto exemplifies early romanticism: the revived interest in baroque style, the perfected use of classical form, and the emergence of true romanticism.

== Discography ==
- Deutsche Grammophon: Gidon Kremer and Martha Argerich with the Orpheus Chamber Orchestra
- Claves Records: Antje Weithaas and Alexander Lonquich with the Camerata Bern (version with winds and timpani)
- Harmonia Mundi: Kristian Bezuidenhout and Gottfried von der Goltz with the Freiburger Barockorchester (version on period instruments with winds and timpani)
- Teldec: Andreas Staier and Rainer Kussmaul with Concerto Köln (version on period instruments without timpani)
- Doron Music: Mario Hossen and Adrian Oetiker with the Les Orpheistes Chamber Orchestra and Joel Mathias Jenny, conductor
- Warner Classics: Yehudi Menuhin and Hephzibah Menuhin with the Menuhin Festival Orchestra
