= Bart van Oort =

Dutch musician

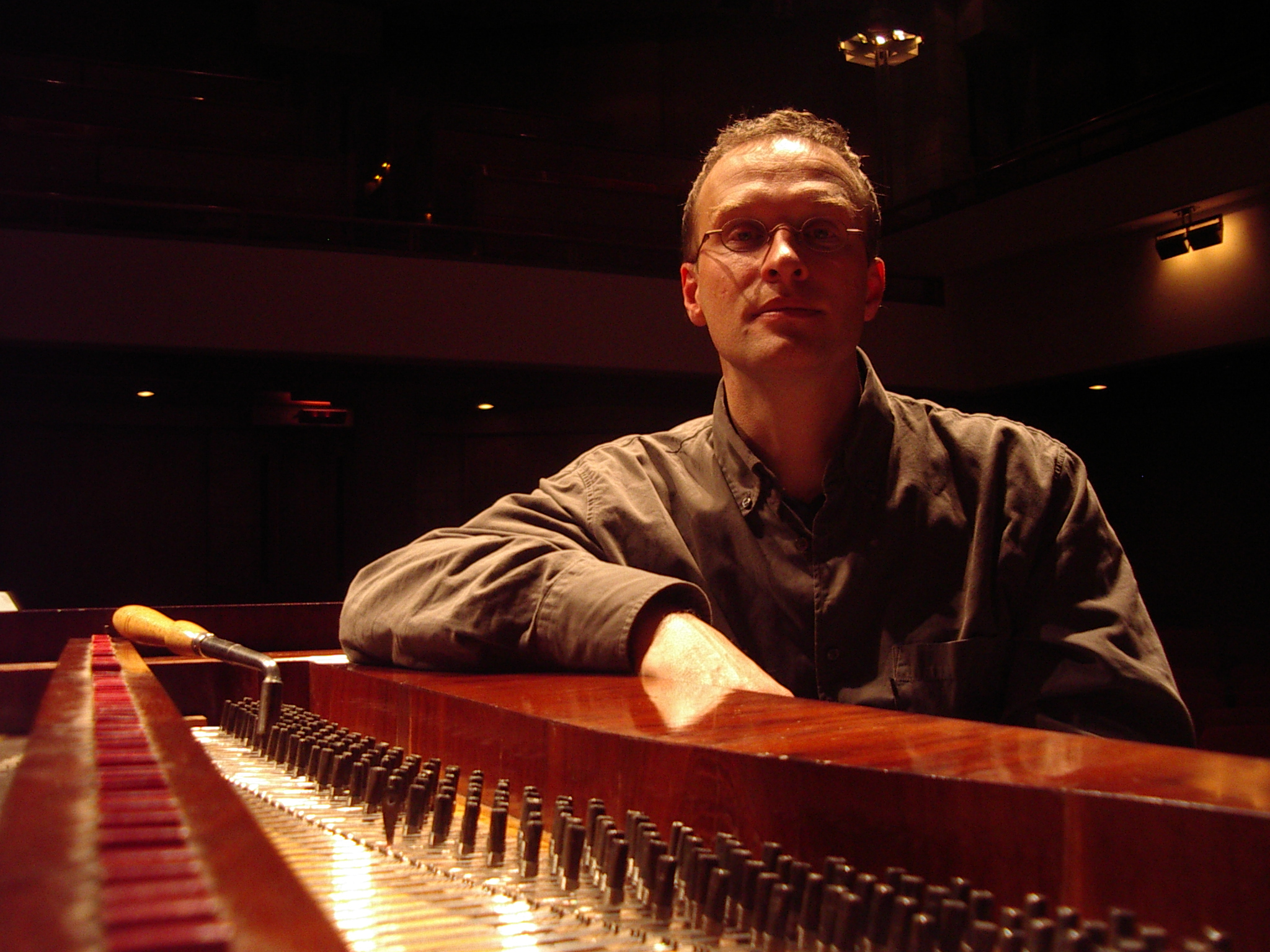

Bart van Oort (born June 6, 1959) is a Dutch classical pianist.

== Biography ==
Van Oort was born in Utrecht. After completing his studies in modern piano in the Royal Conservatory of The Hague in 1983, he studied fortepiano there with Stanley Hoogland. In 1986 he won both first prize, jointly with Geoffrey Lancaster, and the special "Audience" prize at the Mozart Fortepiano Competition in Bruges, Belgium.

Since 1997, van Oort has been a prolific recording artist, as well as recitalist, with roughly 40 recordings to date. His recorded repertoire runs from Haydn, whose complete piano trios he has recorded, to the romantic era, with recordings of Chopin, Field and their lesser-known contemporaries. He recently completed an eight-year project recording the complete keyboard works of Mozart, a collection which includes many pieces hitherto unrecorded. The quatremains pieces he did together with Ursula Dütschler.

After completing his modern piano degree at the Royal Conservatory in The Hague in 1983, Bart van Oort studied fortepiano with Stanley Hoogland, also at the Royal Conservatory. He subsequently studied with Malcolm Bilson at Cornell University (Ithaca, NY) and received a Doctor of Musical Arts degree in Historical Performance Practice in 1993.

Van Oort teaches fortepiano and is a lecturer in Historical Performance Practice at the Royal Conservatory in The Hague, the Conservatory of Amsterdam, and at the Royal Flemish Conservatory in Antwerp. He is also the founder of the Van Swieten Society, which performs classical chamber music.

== Concerts ==
Van Oort has performed in many European countries and appeared at festivals in Utrecht, Florence, Berlin, Antwerp, Bruges, Melbourne, Brisbane, York, Clisson, Montpellier, and Esterhaza. He has also performed in the US and New Zealand, and makes yearly concert and lecturing tours throughout Australia. He was Artist in Residence at the University of Western Australia (DATE) (Perth).

He has given concerts, lectures and masterclasses at the conservatories of Brussels, Paris, Moscow, Helsinki, Oslo, Stavanger, Perugia, Sydney, Adelaide, Wellington, Melbourne, Hong Kong, Tokyo, Juilliard, Bloomington, and Western Ontario, as well as several Dutch conservatories. He has also taught summer courses at the Early Music Institute of Indiana University (Bloomington) and at the University of Western Australia (Perth).

At the bi-annual fortepiano summer workshop which takes place at the castle of Poeke (Belgium), he teaches together with Malcolm Bilson; the next workshop will take place in August 2006.

== Recordings ==
Since 1997 van Oort has made some forty recordings of chamber music and solo repertory, including piano trios by Mozart, Hummel, and Beethoven, and the piano quartets of Mozart, all with his ensemble The Van Swieten Society (formerly Musica Classica). His diverse discography also includes Bohemian Songs with soprano Claron McFadden, the Mendelssohn Double Concerto for piano and violin, and Schubert Sonatas.

Together with six other fortepianists he recorded the complete Beethoven Sonatas (Claves, 1997), and with four other fortepianists he recorded the complete Haydn Sonatas (Brilliant, 2000).

In 2003 the 4-CD box set The Art of the Nocturne in the Nineteenth Century, which included the complete Nocturnes of Field and Chopin as well as works by Pleyel, Kalkbrenner, Clara Schumann, Lefèbure-Wély, E. Weber, Alkan, Glinka, Szymanowska, and Dobrzynski, was awarded the highest rating (five tuning forks) by the French classical music magazine Diapason.

His first recording of Sonatas and Fantasies by Mozart (1998) was awarded a "10" by the Dutch CD magazine Luister, and a second volume appeared in 2001. In 2000, Van Oort recorded Mozart’s complete works for piano, four-hands and two pianos with Ursula Dütschler, as well as two discs of Mozart piano solo Variations, and Complete Songs of Mozart (2 CDs), with Claron McFadden and Bas Ramselaar. December 2005 saw the release of Complete Haydn Piano Trios (10 CDs) with his ensemble the Van Swieten Trio.

On January 27, 2006 (250th anniversary of Mozart’s birth) Van Oort’s 14-CD box set, Mozart: Complete Keyboard Works, was released. This collection, which took eight years to complete, includes all known music for piano solo, piano four-hands, and two pianos, and features many works which have never been recorded before.
