= Franz Tausch =

German clarinetist, teacher and composer

Franz Tausch (26 December 1762 – 9 February 1817) was a German clarinetist, teacher and composer. He played in the Mannheim orchestra. One of his students was Heinrich Baermann.

His compositions include two solo clarinet concertos, two double clarinet concertos, and an assortment of chamber pieces.
