= Piano Sonata No. 2 (Weber) =

Sonata by Carl Maria von Weber

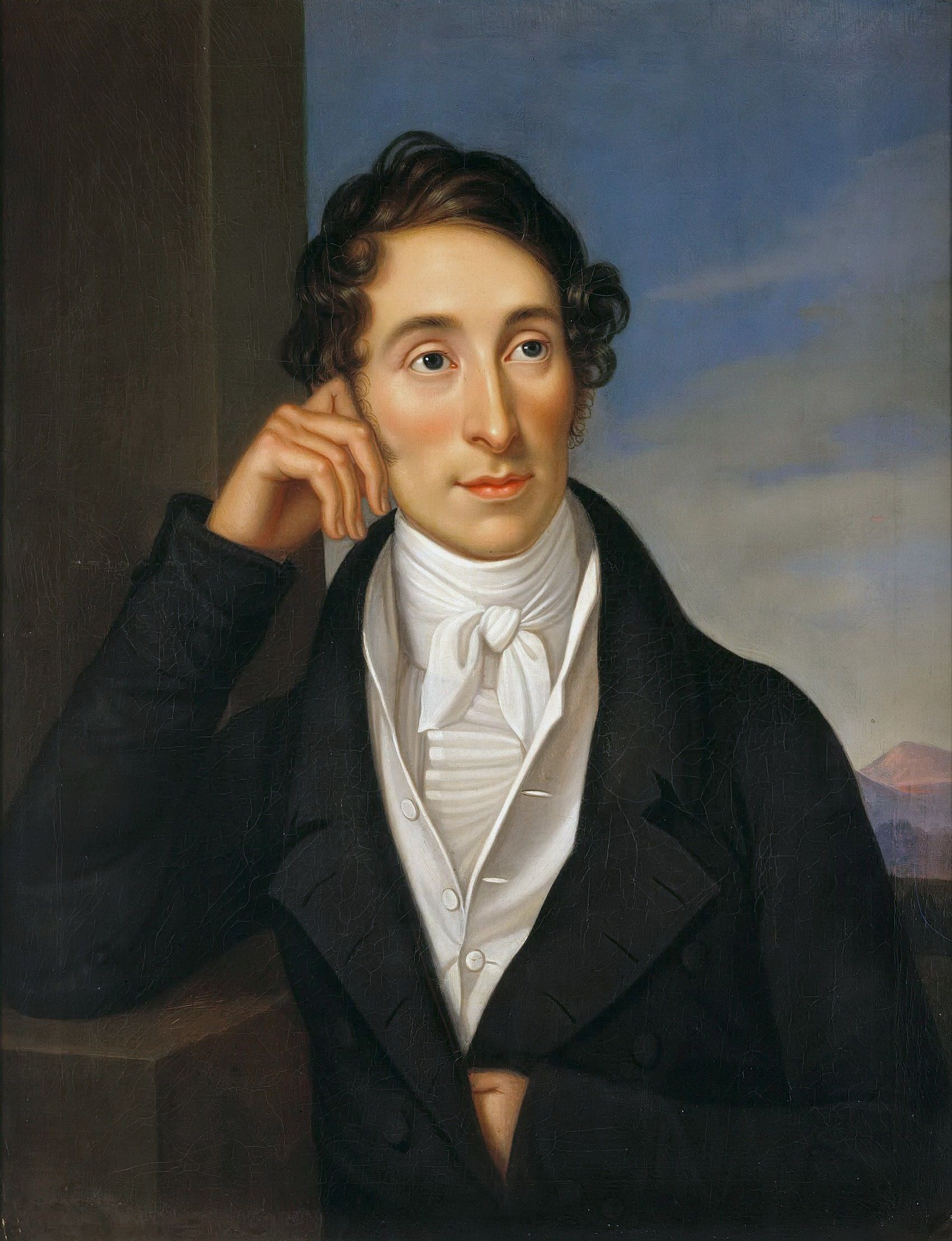
Carl Maria von Weber (1821) Painting by Caroline Bardua

Carl Maria von Weber's Piano Sonata No. 2 in A♭ major, Op. 39, is a piano sonata in four movements. Weber started his piano sonata in 1814 and completed it in 1816.

The sonata is in four movements:

1. Allegro moderato, con spirito ed assai legato
2. Andante
3. Menuetto capriccioso. Presto assai
4. Rondo. Moderato e molto grazioso

The first movement's themes revolve around tremolos, arpeggiated chords and series of octave passages. The andante is calm and solemn at first, transitioning to a powerful middle section before returning to the style of the beginning. The third movement is titled Menuetto capriccioso, although it's tempo and character are much closer to that of a scherzo. The rondo concluding the sonata sparkles with joy and verve despite some rather trite thematic material.
