= Symphony No. 1 (Weber) =

1806/07 symphony by Carl Maria von Weber

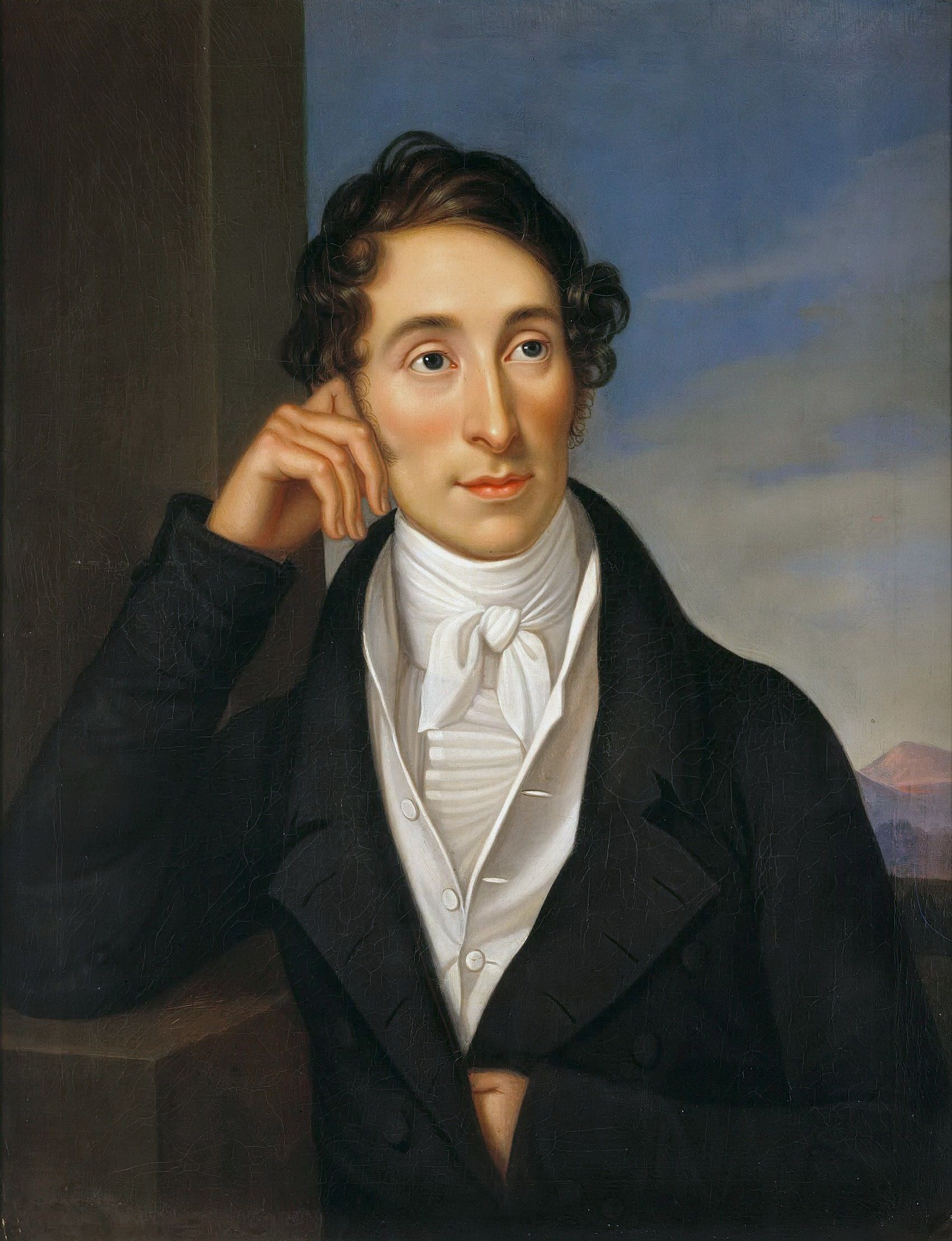
Carl Maria von Weber (1821) Painting by Caroline Bardua

Carl Maria von Weber's Symphony No. 1 in C, Op. 19, (J. 50) was written in 1806–1807. It was written for Duke Eugen of Württemberg, who employed Weber from 1806.

It has four movements:

1. Allegro con fuoco
2. Andante
3. Scherzo. Presto
4. Finale. Presto

== Orchestration ==
The symphony is written for flute, 2 oboes, 2 bassoons, 2 horns in C, 2 trumpets in C, timpani, and strings.

== Form ==
=== I. Allegro con fuoco ===
The theme is as follows played by the strings:

Following this a "establishment theme" that plays at the end of the end of a new key change, at the start played by the violas, cellos and basses.

Then follows a march theme accompanying the second theme then repeated by the flute.
