= Henrik Wiese =

German flutist

Henrik Wiese (born 22 July 1971) is a German flutist.

== Life and career ==
Born in Vienna, Wiese studied in his hometown of Hamburg with Ingrid Koch-Dörnbrak and in Munich with Paul Meisen. In 1995, he was engaged as principal flutist at the Bavarian State Opera Munich. In 2006, he moved to the same position in the Bavarian Radio Symphony Orchestra. Wiese received calls to the Hochschule für Künste Bremen in 2018 and to the Hochschule für Musik Nürnberg in 2020.

Wiese is a prize-winner of the 1995 Deutscher Musikwettbewerb and the international competitions in Kobe / Japan 1997, Internationaler Instrumentalwettbewerb Markneukirchen 1998, Odense / Denmark Carl Nielsen 1998 and 2000 ARD International Music Competition.

His artistic work is documented by several recordings (CD, radio and television recordings). In addition to the Böhm flute, Wiese also plays the transverse flute and can be heard with this instrument in the "Accademia giocosa". Since 1997, Wiese has worked as an editor for, among others, G. Henle Verlag in Munich, Breitkopf & Härtel in Wiesbaden or Universal Edition in Vienna. His editorial and scholarly interests focus on the works of Wolfgang Amadeus Mozart, Bach's pupil Johann Philipp Kirnberger and Gewandhaus Kapellmeister Carl Reinecke.

Wiese is a synesthesist.

== Editions (selection) ==
- Mozart: Hafner-Sinfonie KV 385.
- Mozart: Große g-Moll-Sinfonie KV 550
- Mozart: Gran Partita KV 361.
- Mozart: Oboen- bzw. Flötenkonzert KV 314.
- Mozart: Hornkonzerte KV 412, 417, 447 und 495.
- Reinecke: Flute Concerto D major op. 283.
- Weber: Trio for Piano, Flute and Cello, op. 63.
- Wiese: The Flute Audition, Collection of audition excerpts for flute.
- Wiese: The Piccolo & Alto Flute Audition, Collection of audition excerpts for piccolo and alto flute
