= Clarinet Quintet (Weber) =

Musical composition by Carl Maria von Weber

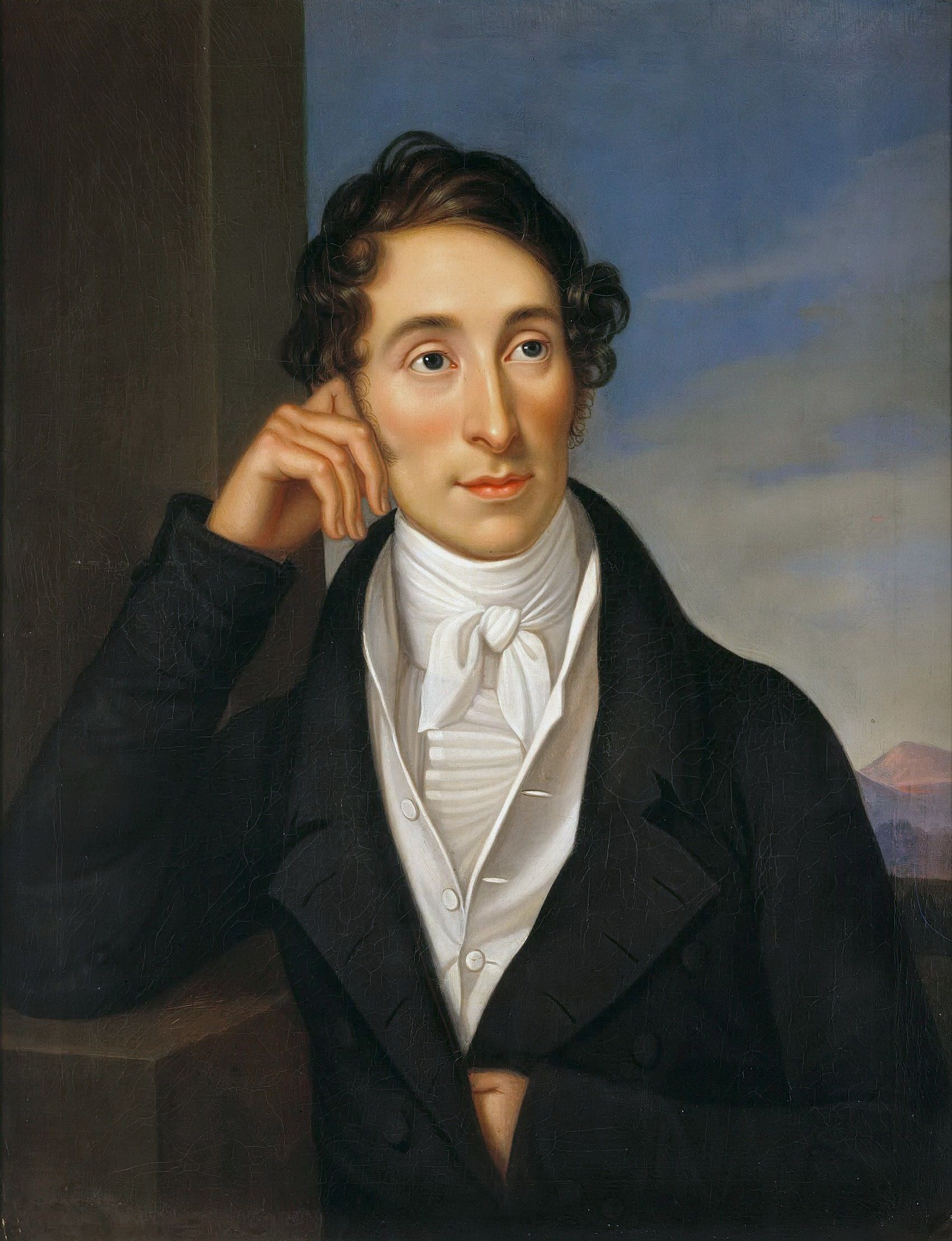
Carl Maria von Weber (1821) Painting by Caroline Bardua

The Clarinet Quintet in B♭ Major, Op. 34, is a clarinet quintet that was composed by Carl Maria von Weber from 1811 to 1815. As with most of Weber's other clarinet compositions, the quintet was written for the German clarinet virtuoso Heinrich Baermann.

== Structure ==
The quintet is written in four movements:

1. Allegro
2. Fantasia. Adagio
3. Menuetto capriccio. Presto
4. Rondo. Allegro gioioso

A typical performance lasts between 25 and 30 minutes.
