= Clarinet Concerto No. 1 (Weber) =

Musical composition by Carl Maria von Weber

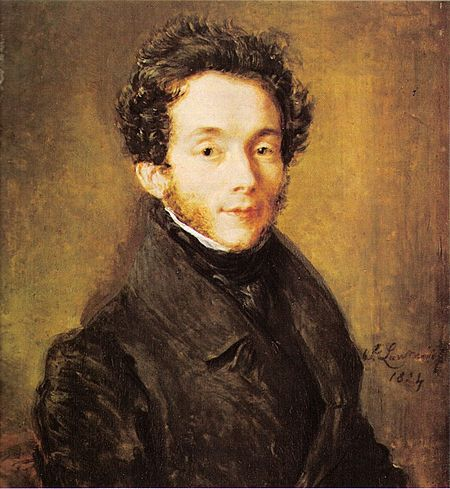
Carl Maria von Weber (1814)

Carl Maria von Weber wrote his Clarinet Concerto No. 1 in F minor, Op. 73 (J. 114) for the clarinettist Heinrich Bärmann in 1811. The piece is highly regarded in the instrument's repertoire. It is written for clarinet in B♭. The work consists of three movements in the form of fast, slow, fast. It was premiered in Munich on 13 June 1811, with Maximilian I Joseph of Bavaria in attendance.

== Structure ==
The concerto has three movements:

1. Allegro in F minor modulating into D♭ major and later returning to F minor with a meter of 3/4
2. Adagio ma non troppo in C major transforming into C minor and E♭ major and afterward reverting to C major with a meter of 4/4
3. Rondo; Allegretto in F major with a meter of 2/4

=== I. Allegro ===
This movement was very innovative for its time, with some stylistic aspects characteristic of later composers like Felix Mendelssohn. The normal output for this time was material such as Beethoven's Piano Concerto No. 5 from exactly the same year as this composition, 1811.

Weber starts with the cellos playing the main theme, followed the whole orchestra. The violins pick up the melody which eventually progresses, subsides, and clears the stage for the solo clarinet. The soloist begins with a song marked "con duolo". The clarinetist performs variants on that source, which later results in a determined run played by the solo instrument. After that climax, the music dies off with the clarinet mourning a line marked "morendo". Then there is a grand pause, which provides the transition for the return of the cellos stating the main theme, but this time in the key of D♭ major rather than F minor.

The soloist enters shortly afterward with a sweet response. The clarinet keeps playing a delicate melody, then descends towards the lower tones with a marking of "perdendosi," which tells the player to decrease in speed and sound. Then the tutti arrives, singing a sweet, innocent melody. The clarinet reenters shortly after, still playing in a lighter mood than the beginning of the piece. Later, the soloist performs sets of playful triplets.

After the triplets, the clarinet begins the Bärmann-Kadenz, written by the dedicatee, Heinrich Bärmann. This is a relatively short, lively, virtuosic passage that is played by most performers. Then the clarinetist encounters a brief cadenza which consists of fast 32nd notes. After the cadenza, the orchestra bursts in and returns to the minor home key. Then the music calms down, and the cellos prepare for the entrance the clarinet will make. When the clarinet enters, it brings back the same emotions as when the soloist entered for the first time. It seems like the clarinet yearns to play the light, innocent theme heard before. It finally gets its wish, bringing back the melody played earlier. Then, the clarinet starts its triplets as it did before, but this time, it flows towards a stream of agitated, virtuosic 16th-note runs.

After that buildup, the clarinet subsides and gives room for the French horns to play a cheerful melody. The solo instrument responds in the same connotation as the horns did but then sneaks back to the dark theme the soloist first played. It intensifies and then the soloist whirls up and down in 16th notes until the tutti arrives with vengeance. The orchestra ends its phrase with dotted chords which give cue for the soloist to perform its next ordeal. This features rising chromatic scale runs which flow into a river of sixteenth notes. The sixteenths are followed by a series of determined trills with the last one ending on a high G. The orchestra returns and eventually fades away. The clarinet ends the movement much like how it did before the arrival of the D♭ major key.

=== II. Adagio ma non troppo ===
The beginning of the second movement is typical of an early romantic operatic aria, but still resembles the second movement of the Mozart Clarinet Concerto in mood and melodic shape. Weber was, after all, Mozart's cousin by marriage. In the middle section, an unusual and rare but effective use of a horn trio without any other orchestral elaboration is put into effect. The clarinet responds and interacts with this horn trio much like an operatic singer would do it in a similar situation. The beginning material resumes after a brief pause.

=== III. Rondo ===
The third movement contrasts with the preceding movements because of the light character. It is a typical rondo that usually ends a three movement concerto. Instances like this in other similar works include the third movement of Weber's Clarinet Concerto No. 2, Mozart's Clarinet Concerto, the third movement of Karl Stamitz's Clarinet Concerto No. 3, the final movements of Franz Krommer's Clarinet Concerto in E♭ major and Concerto for Two Clarinets, and the last movements of Louis Spohr's Clarinet Concerto's Nos. 1, 2, and 4.

== Instrumentation ==
Scored for 2 flutes, 2 oboes, 2 bassoons, 3 horns, 2 trumpets, timpani, strings, and solo clarinet.
