= Friedrich Wilhelm Jähns =

German music scholar, voice teacher, and composer

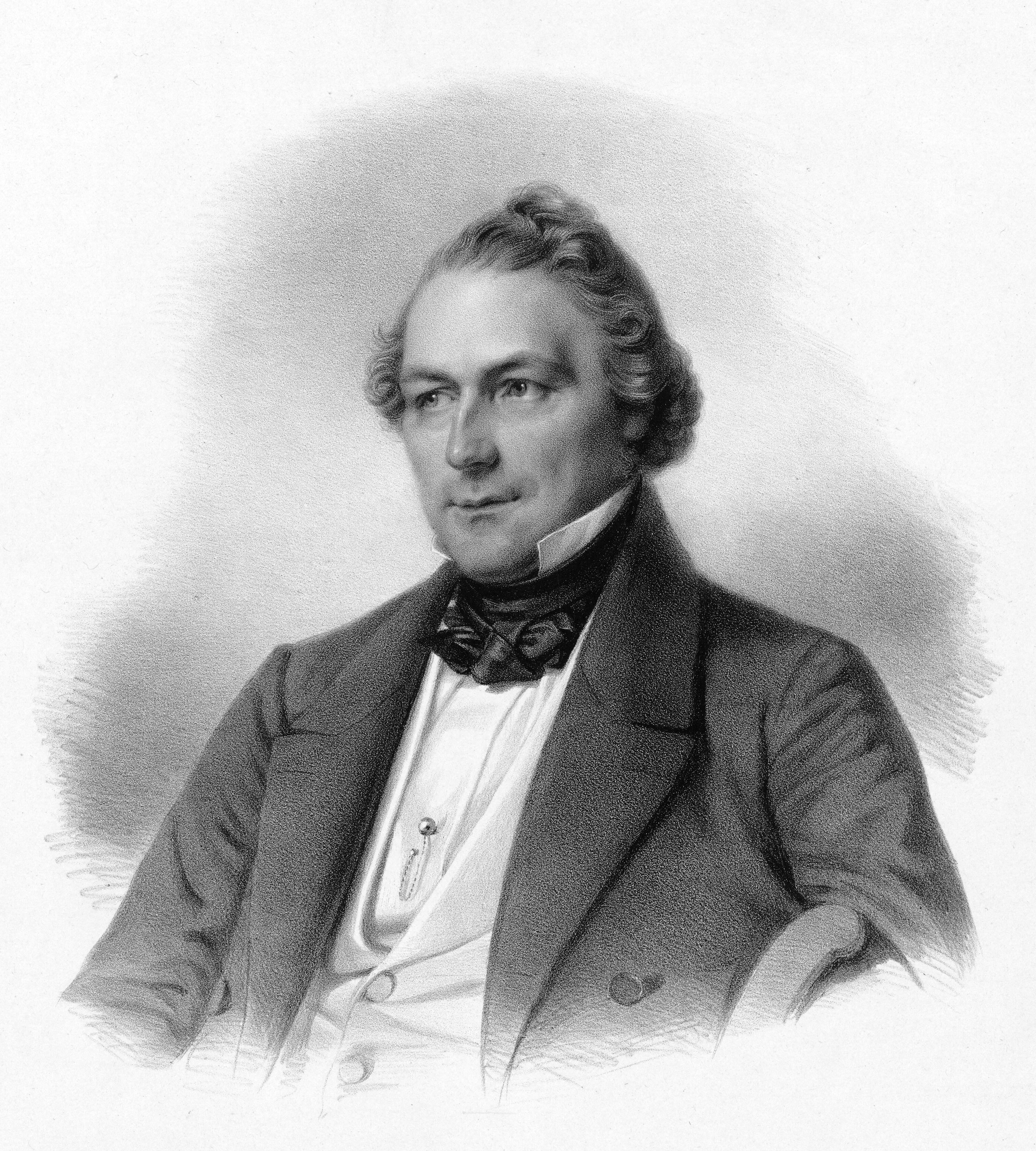
Friedrich Wilhelm Jähns, 1850

Friedrich Wilhelm Jähns (German: [jɛːns]; 2 January 1809 – 8 August 1888) was a German music scholar, voice teacher, and composer. He is best known for his chronological catalog of the works of Carl Maria von Weber.

Jähns was born and died in Berlin. His grave is preserved in the Protestant Friedhof I der Jerusalems- und Neuen Kirchengemeinde (Cemetery No. I of the congregations of Jerusalem's Church and New Church) in Berlin-Kreuzberg, south of Hallesches Tor.

== See also ==
- List of compositions by Carl Maria von Weber - a complete listing of the Jähns Catalogue
