= Heinrich Baermann =

German clarinet virtuoso (1784–1847)

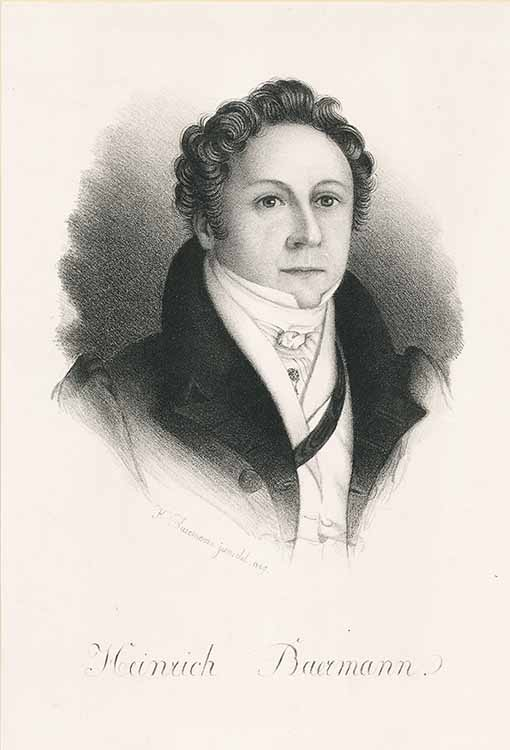
Heinrich Baermann

Heinrich Joseph Baermann (also spelled Bärmann; 14 February 1784 – 11 June 1847) was a German clarinet virtuoso of the Classical and Romantic eras who is generally considered as being not only an outstanding performer of his time, but highly influential in the creation of several important composers' works for his instrument. He was the father of clarinetist and composer Carl Baermann, Sr. and the grandfather of pianist and composer Carl Baermann, Jr.

== Life ==
Baermann was born in Potsdam. In his youth, Baermann took lessons from Joseph Beer (1744–1811) at the military school in Potsdam. After his prowess came to the attention of the Berlin court in 1804, Prince Louis Ferdinand of Prussia had the 20-year-old musician pursue his training in Berlin under the guidance of Franz Tausch (1762–1817). He played in the court orchestra of Munich from 1807 until his retirement in 1834, when his son Carl Baermann succeeded him.

Parallel to Baermann's rise, the clarinet was undergoing a series of developments in key construction and embouchure that allowed greater agility and flexibility in playing. The growing custom was to play with the reed on the bottom lip, as is done today, as opposed to the top lip as had been the previous prevailing style. Baermann was an exponent of this new style of playing, and possessed a modern instrument made by Griesling & Schlott which allowed him to play chromatic passages with far greater ease than traditional 5-keyed instruments. He is said to have had a great dynamic range.

Numerous composers wrote for Baermann, who undoubtedly had a great influence on the Romantic clarinet repertoire thereby. Along with lesser-known composers such as Franz Danzi and Peter von Lindpaintner, Baermann received works from Felix Mendelssohn, Carl Maria von Weber and Giacomo Meyerbeer. Mendelssohn most notably wrote the two Konzertstücke, Opp. 113, 114 (Concert Pieces) for Baermann and his son Carl to play together; Meyerbeer wrote a quintet (1812) and concertos, and Weber produced numerous works including two concertos (Op. 73 and Op. 74), a quintet (Op. 34), the Concertino, Op. 26 and the Sylvana Variations, Op. 33, but not the Grand Duo Concertant (Op. 48).

As with many other virtuosi at the time, Baermann tried his hand fairly successfully at composing for his instrument. Among other works, he wrote a Septet in E-flat major, Op. 23, for clarinet, string quartet, and two ad libitum horns. The Adagio movement from his quintet, op. 25 has received several recordings as a stand-alone piece, though it was for many years misattributed to Richard Wagner.

Baermann died in Munich, aged 63.

== Recordings ==
- Concertstück in G minor, Concertino in C minor, Concertino in E-flat major, Dieter Klöcker, Orfeo International C 065 011 A, 2001
- Adagio for clarinet and strings in D-flat, Academy of St Martin in the Fields, Neville Marriner – The Argo Years (2014)
