= Waltz in A-flat major, Op. 42 (Chopin) =

Composition for piano by Frédéric Chopin

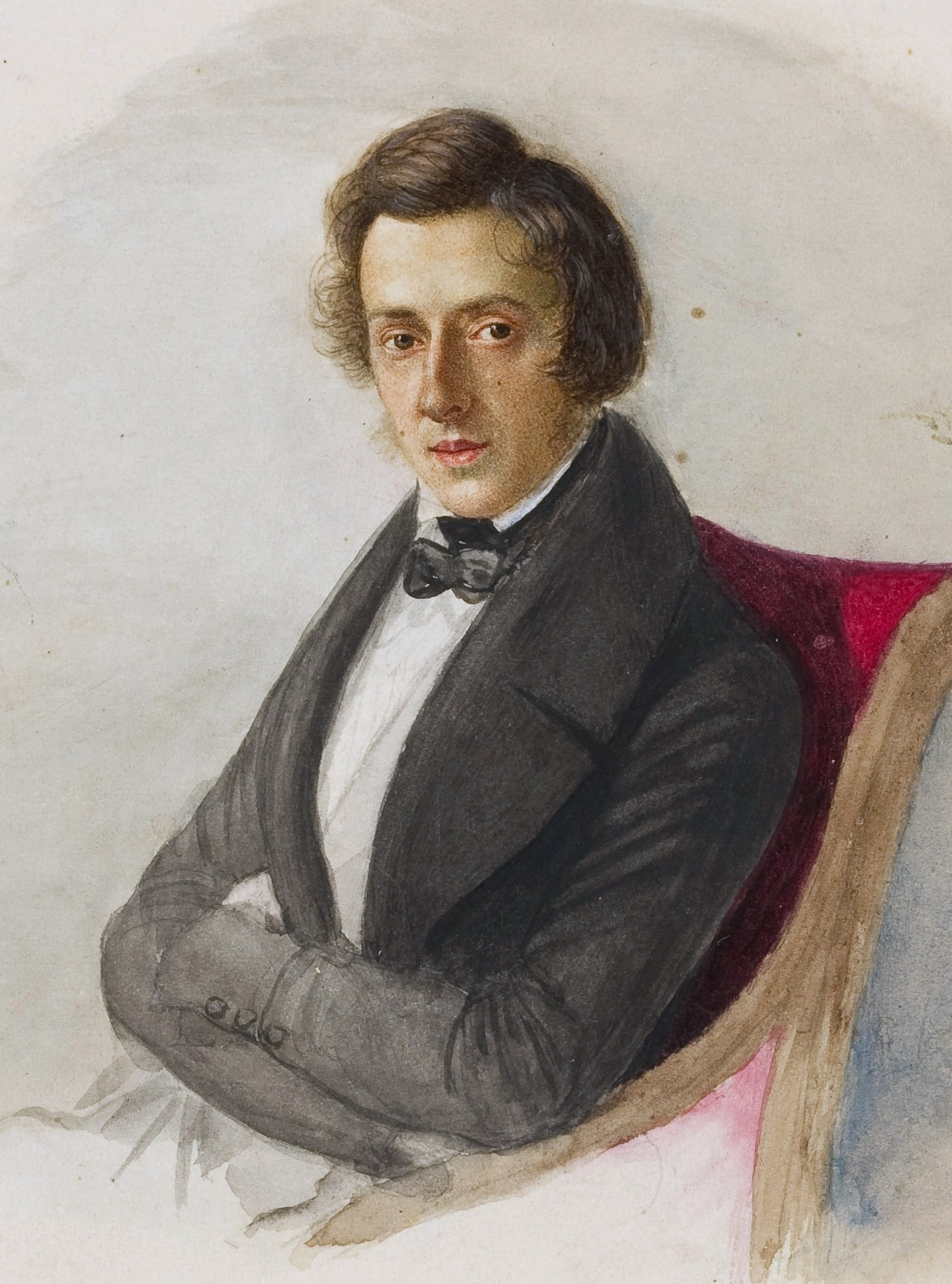
Chopin, 1835

Waltz in A♭ major, Op. 42 performed by Olga Gurevich

Waltz in A♭ major, Op. 42, is a lively waltz composed by Frédéric Chopin in 1840.

== Background ==
Though none of Chopin's works were actually intended to be danced to, this waltz does appear to be appropriate for use in the ballroom. It is often considered to be one of the finest of Chopin's waltzes.

== Analysis ==
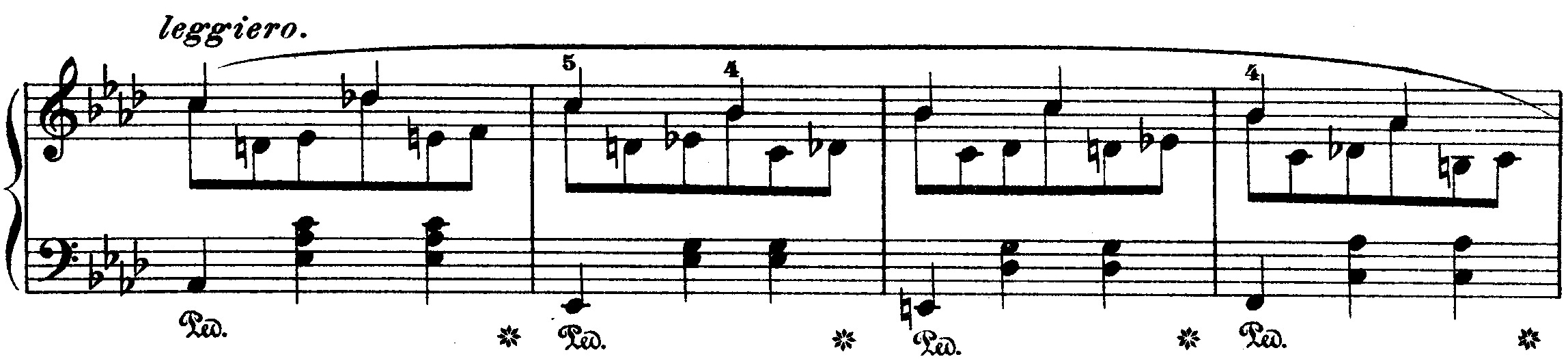
First theme (Schirmer 1894, ed. Karol Mikuli)

The piece begins with an eight-bar introductory trill on the dominant, calling for the dance to begin. The opening melody of the work is light and in duple time, it is accompanied with a 3/4 left hand accompaniment. This waltz contains many virtuosic passages and a mesmerizing coda, making it a favourite with audiences. It is often considered one of Chopin's most important waltzes and is also one of the most challenging to play.

== Appreciation ==
U.S. President Harry S. Truman, an amateur pianist, told friends that Chopin's Waltz in A♭ major was one of his favorite compositions.
