= Clarinet Concerto No. 2 (Weber) =

Musical composition by Carl Maria von Weber

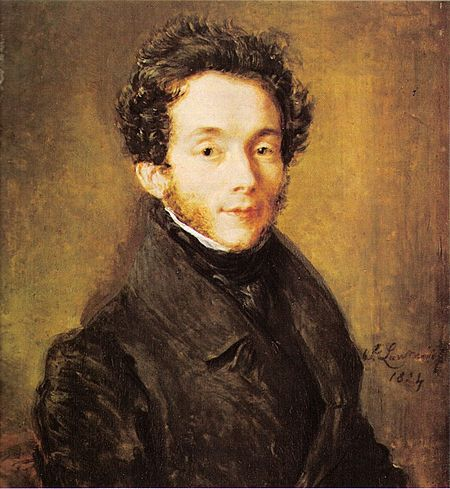
Carl Maria von Weber (1814)

Carl Maria von Weber wrote his Clarinet Concerto No. 2 in E♭ major, Op. 74, J. 118 in 1811, and premiered on December 25, 1813. Like all of Weber's clarinet works except for the Grand Duo Concertant, the clarinet concerto is dedicated to Heinrich Baermann, who was soloist at the premiere.

== Music ==
The concerto is scored for a solo clarinet and an orchestra consisting of 2 flutes, 2 oboes, 2 bassoons, 2 horns, 2 trumpets, timpani, and strings.

It is composed of three movements:

1. Allegro
2. Romanze: Andante con moto
3. Alla Polacca

A typical performance lasts 23 minutes. The first movement typically lasts for approximately 8:30 minutes, the second movement for approximately 7 minutes and the third movement for between 6:30 and 7 minutes depending on the tempo.

=== I. Allegro ===
The first movement, in E♭ major, begins with an exposition of the main theme by the orchestra. The clarinet soloist enters with a high F (E♭ in terms of concert pitch) followed by a 3 octave jump before repeating the opening theme. This 3 octave jump, along with other large leaps, is stylistic of this movement. The majority of the first half of the movement sits very comfortably in E♭ major before modulating to D♭ major where much of the previous clarinet melodic material is repeated. The movement finishes with a rather virtuosic clarinet part extending to a written B♭, which is near the limits of clarinet range.

=== II. Romanze: Andante con moto ===
The second movement, by stark contrast in G minor, is reflective of Weber's many operas. With its operatic phrasing, this movement exhibits the rich tone of the clarinet. The clarinet melody has very expressive dynamics, often going from fortissimo to piano in the space of one bar. After the initial statement of the melody, the work moves into an orchestral section in G major which acts as a sort of extended dominant to C minor when the clarinet enters again. It is in the C minor section when we begin to see short note values which adds to a very operatic style. Once again the orchestra goes into a section in G major, which exactly imitates the previous section, also in G major. Suddenly the clarinet enters in E♭ major with a virtuosic scale followed by numerous runs. In this E♭ major section there is some very large leaps, one being 3 octaves and a tone at bar 56. The work shifts back to G minor with a recitative, once again in the operatic style. This is taken very freely with the clarinet and orchestra taking turns in playing. After the recitative, the original melody is repeated and followed by a rather short cadenza before the work finishes with a long concert G from the clarinet.

=== III. Alla Polacca ===
III. Alla Polacca
Performed by the Skidmore College Orchestra

Considered staple clarinet repertoire, the third movement in E♭ major is an exhibition of technique and style on the part of the soloist. The polonaise is a slow ballroom dance, yet some soloists choose to take the movement at a far faster speed than what is traditional or intended for the true polonaise dance; nonetheless, many soloists dedicated to the text choose to take the movement at the danceable speed of a traditional polonaise. Once again, Weber regularly uses rather large leaps to embellish the clarinet melody which is usually made up of semiquavers (16th notes). The melody is often dotted and syncopated to give a somewhat cheeky feel to the work, with these sections being marked by a "scherzando," implying playfulness. Measures 19-20 are regarded as one of the hardest fragments for clarinet repertoire because of the clarinet playing without orchestra with very fast leaps, all slurred. The work sits very comfortably in E♭ major until Weber uses a series of diminished chords to send the work into C major. However, this is short lived as the work comes back to E♭ with the original melody being stated again first in E major, and then the tonic. The work finishes with one of the most glittery, virtuosic passages in the clarinet repertoire marked "brillante", made up of largely arpeggios and scalic runs in sextuplet semiquavers.
