= Grand Duo Concertant (Weber) =

Musical work by Carl Maria von Weber

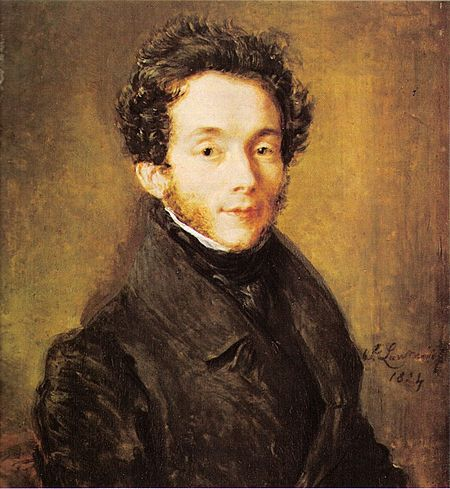
Carl Maria von Weber (1814)

Grand Duo Concertant
I. Allegro con fuoco

II. Andante con moto

III. Allegro
Performed by William McColl (clarinet) and Joseph Levine (piano)

The Grand Duo Concertant, Opus 48, J204, is a three-movement work in F major for clarinet and piano composed by Carl Maria von Weber from 1815 to 1816. It is a virtuosic piece for both instruments. Weber most likely composed the work for himself (on piano) and his friend Heinrich Baermann, a leading clarinettist of the era, although it has also been suggested that the intended clarinettist was Johann Simon Hermstedt.

The three movements are as follows:

1. Allegro con fuoco
2. Andante con moto
3. Rondo: allegro

The second and third movements were completed before the first and were probably performed in 1815 for King Maximilian I Joseph of Bavaria at the Nymphenburg Palace. During its composition, Weber designated the work as a sonata, but abandoned that title upon its completion. This decision reflected the work's character as more of a showcase for two virtuosos than a conventionally structured and integrated work. The first movement is in sonata form, the second movement is an Andante in C minor, and the finale is a lilting rondo in E♭ major. The British music critic John Warrack suggests the work could be referred to as a "double concerto without orchestra", reflecting the highly virtuosic roles for both performers.

The autograph manuscript of the work is preserved in the Library of Congress.

== Recordings ==
Etcetera Records, Roeland Hendrikx Ensemble, C.M. von Weber (Grand Quintetto op.34, Grand Duo Concertant op.48, Variations on a theme of Silvana op.33) (2017)
