= Caroline Bardua =

German painter (1781–1864)

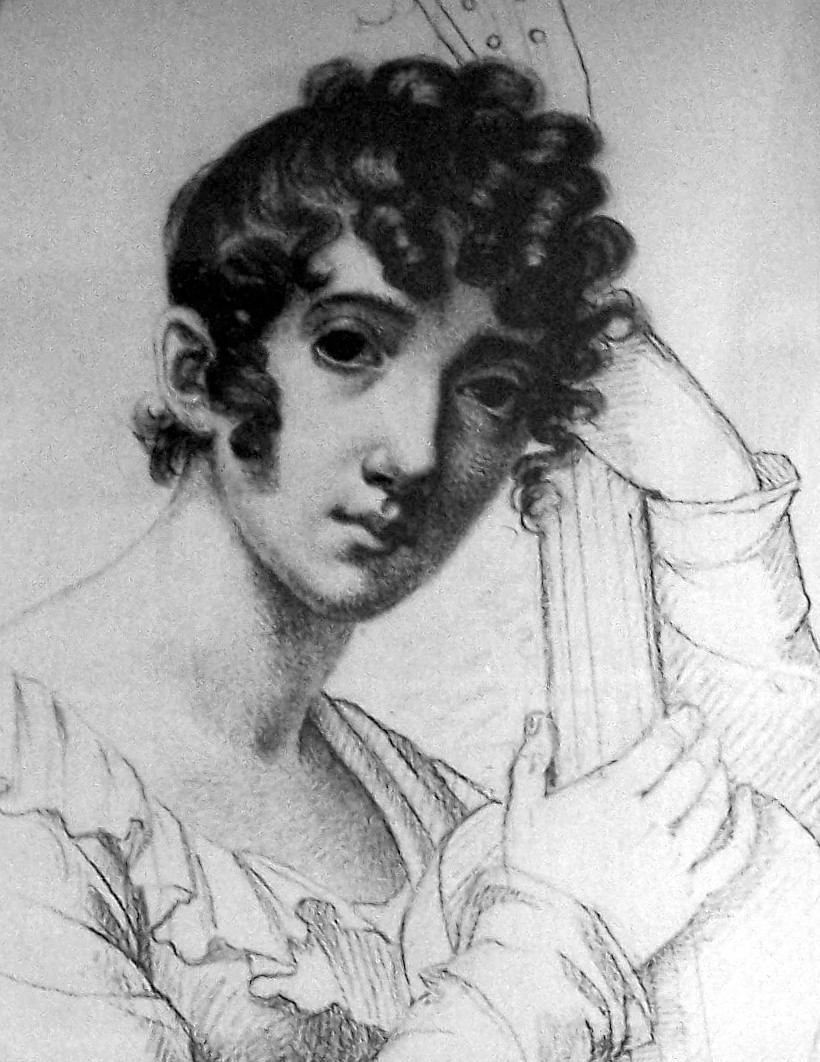
Caroline Bardua – Self Portrait with Lute (Selbstbildnis mit Laute), 1822

Caroline Bardua (also Karoline Bardua; 11 November 1781 – 2 June 1864) was a German painter. She was one of the first middle-class women who was able to create an existence for herself as an independent artist.

== Life ==
Caroline Bardua was born in Ballenstedt, Anhalt-Bernburg. She was the daughter of Johann Adam Bardua, the valet of Alexius Frederick Christian, Duke of Anhalt-Bernburg, and Sophie Sabine Kirchner. Her first art instruction came from 1805 to 1807 under Hans Heinrich Meyer in Weimar. In Weimar she was also an acquaintance of the author Johann Wolfgang von Goethe, whose portrait she drew. From 1808 to 1811 she, together with Louise Seidler, was a student of Gerhard von Kügelgen in Dresden. In his workshop she and other students produced copies of paintings. She also became acquainted with Anton Graff and the then unknown Caspar David Friedrich. After the end of her apprenticeship with Kügelgen, Caroline and her sister, the singer Wilhelmine Bardua, traveled together to Paris and Frankfurt.

In 1819 the two sisters, who remained unmarried for their entire lives, arrived in Berlin, where they led a Salon. One of the guests was the poet August Friedrich Ernst Langbein. At first Caroline's work was much in demand in Berlin, but that situation soon changed for the worse. An exhibit in 1822, in which Caroline's works were shown together with works by Friedrich Wilhelm Schadow, was one of the main causes of her downfall. Her portraits of Princess Alexandrine of Prussia, the prince and other family members were harshly criticized in comparison with paintings by Schadow, who unlike Bardua had received academic training. In 1827 the two sisters had to give up their residence in Berlin for financial reasons. They then led an itinerant lifestyle, frequently moving between small cities such as Heidelberg or Krefeld, avoiding any competition. Both of the sisters continued to live together. After the death of Caroline in 1864 Wilhelmine published a biography of her sister and then died a year later in 1865. The biography, Das Jugendleben der Malerin Caroline Bardua was first published posthumously in 1874.

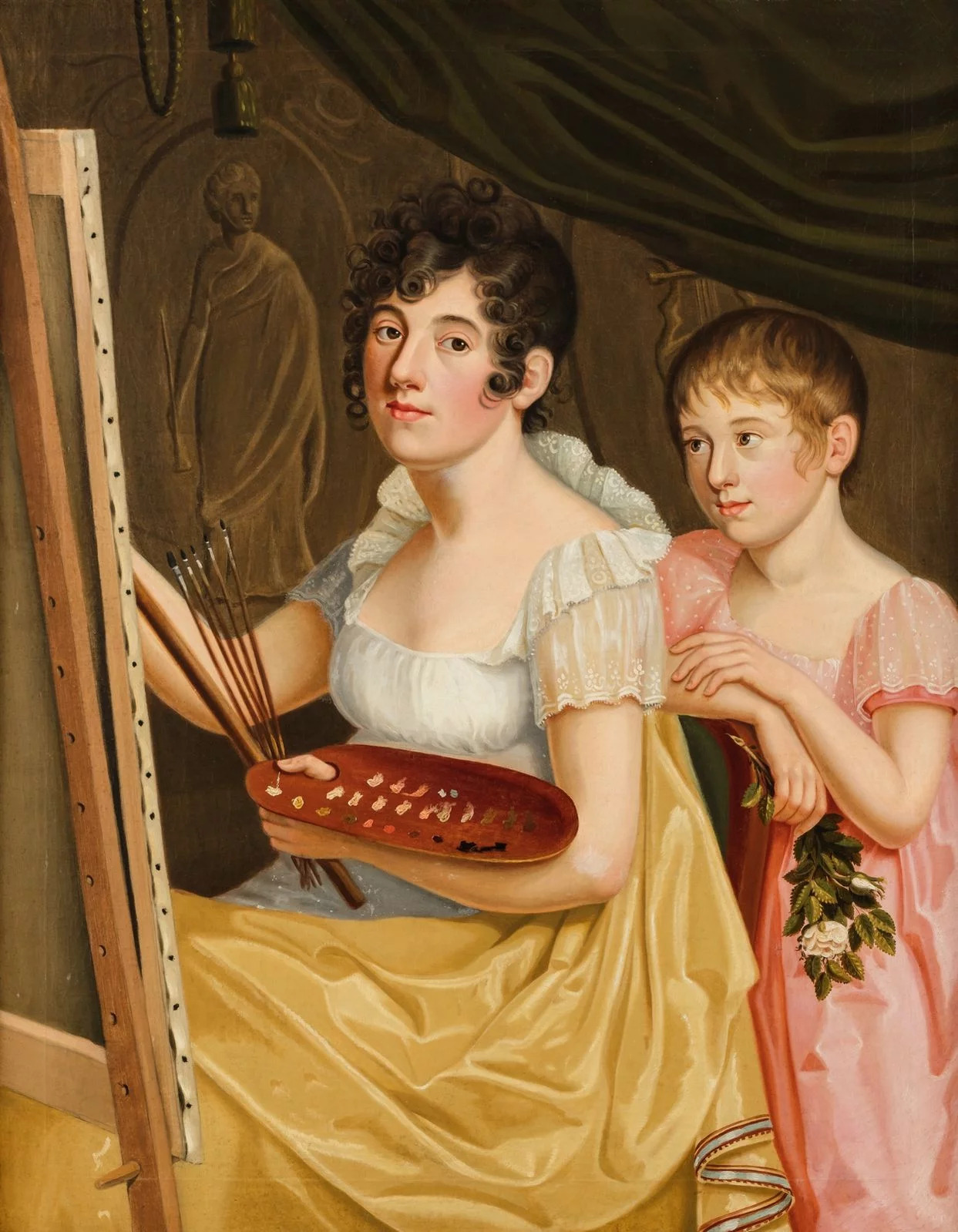
Caroline Bardua – Johanna und Adele Schopenhauer (detail), 1806

== Work ==
Bardua was primarily a portrait painter. The subjects of her portraits include Caspar David Friedrich, Carl Maria von Weber, Julius Eduard Hitzig, Niccolo Paganini, Johann Wolfgang von Goethe, his wife Christiane von Goethe, and Johanna Schopenhauer.

== Gallery ==
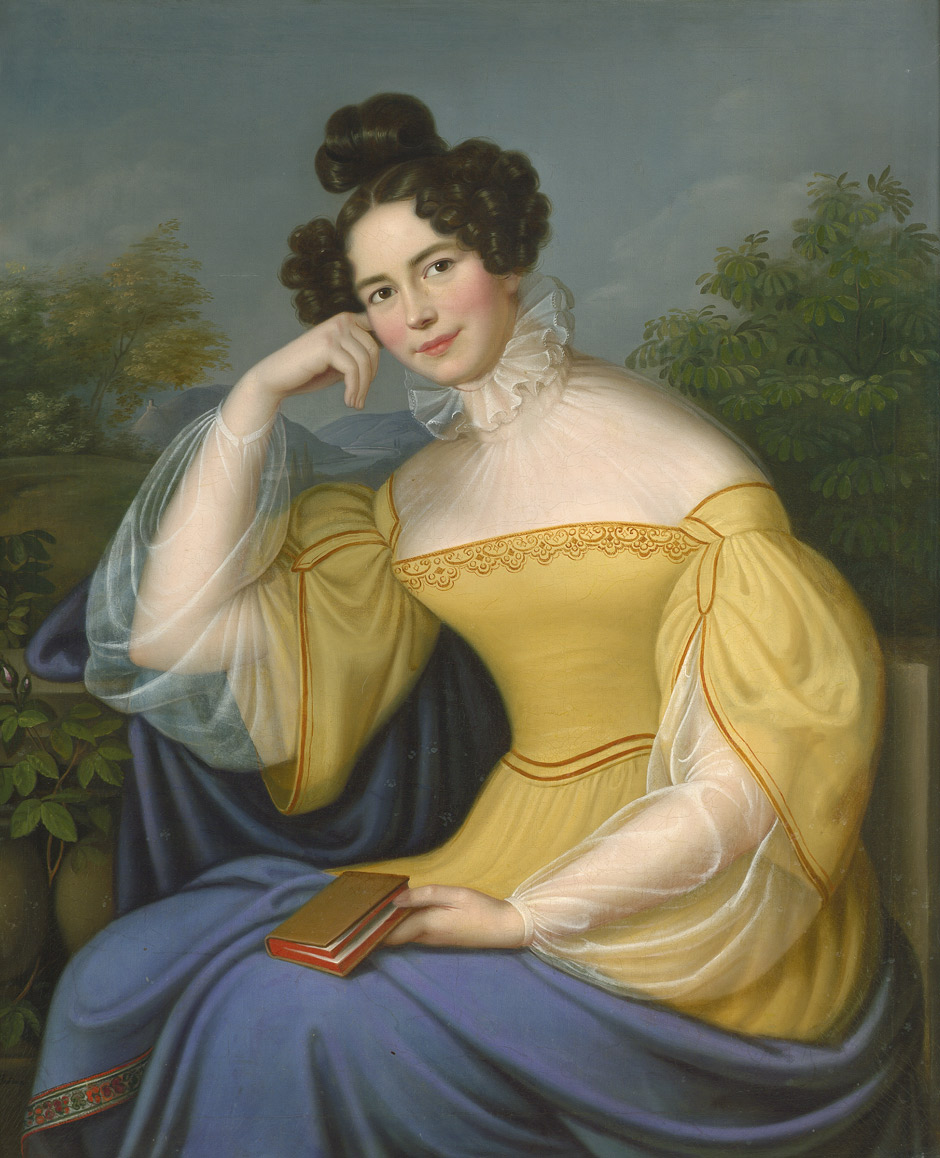
Portrait of a young woman in a yellow dress, 1830

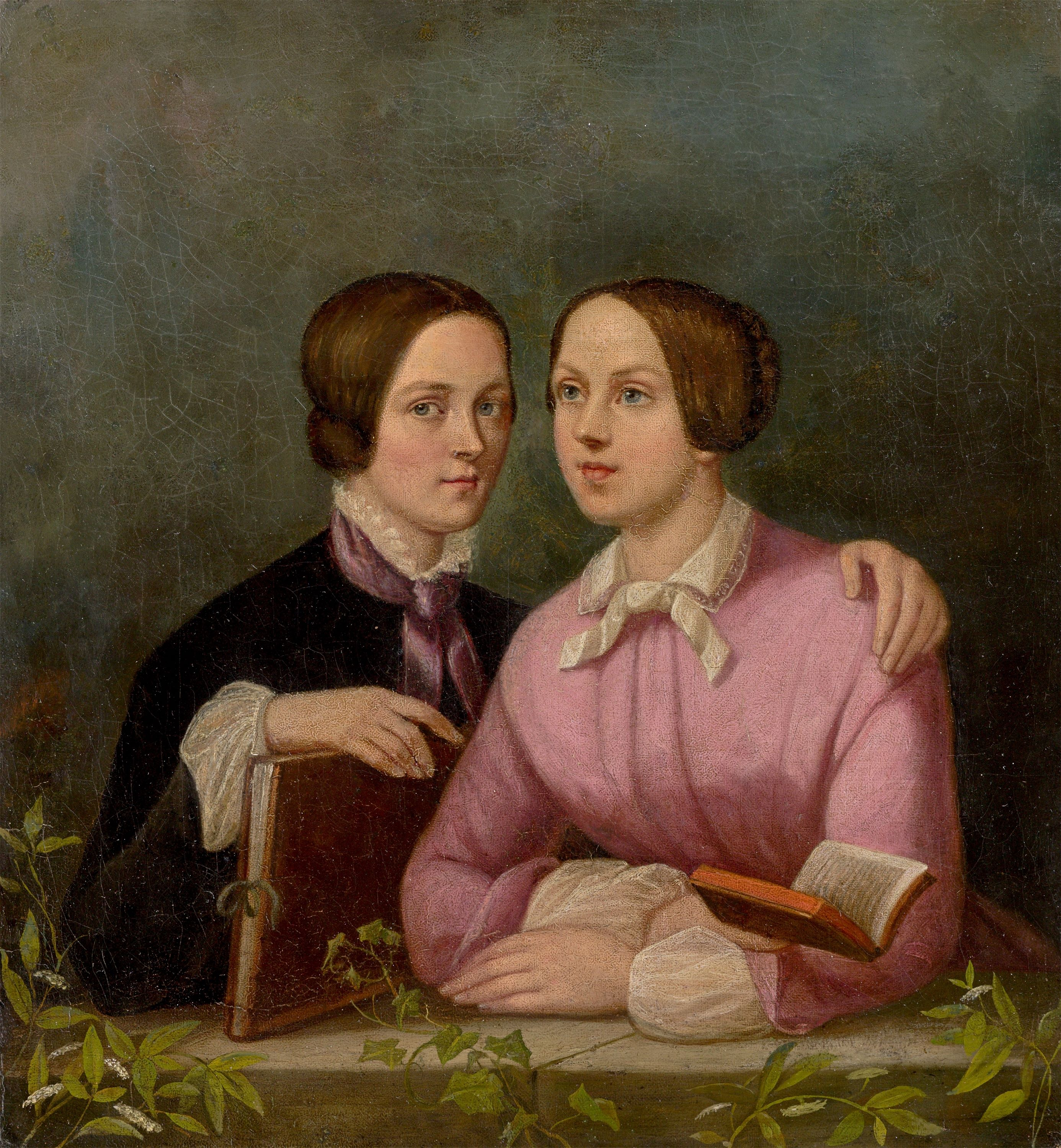
Double portrait of the nieces Bardua, 1850

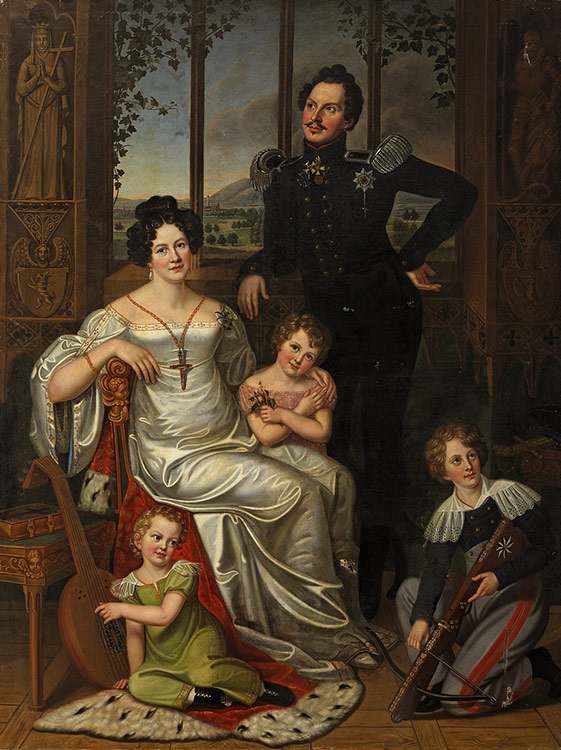
Prince Wilhelm of Prussia with his wife, Princess Marianne of Hesse-Homburg and his children, 1820s

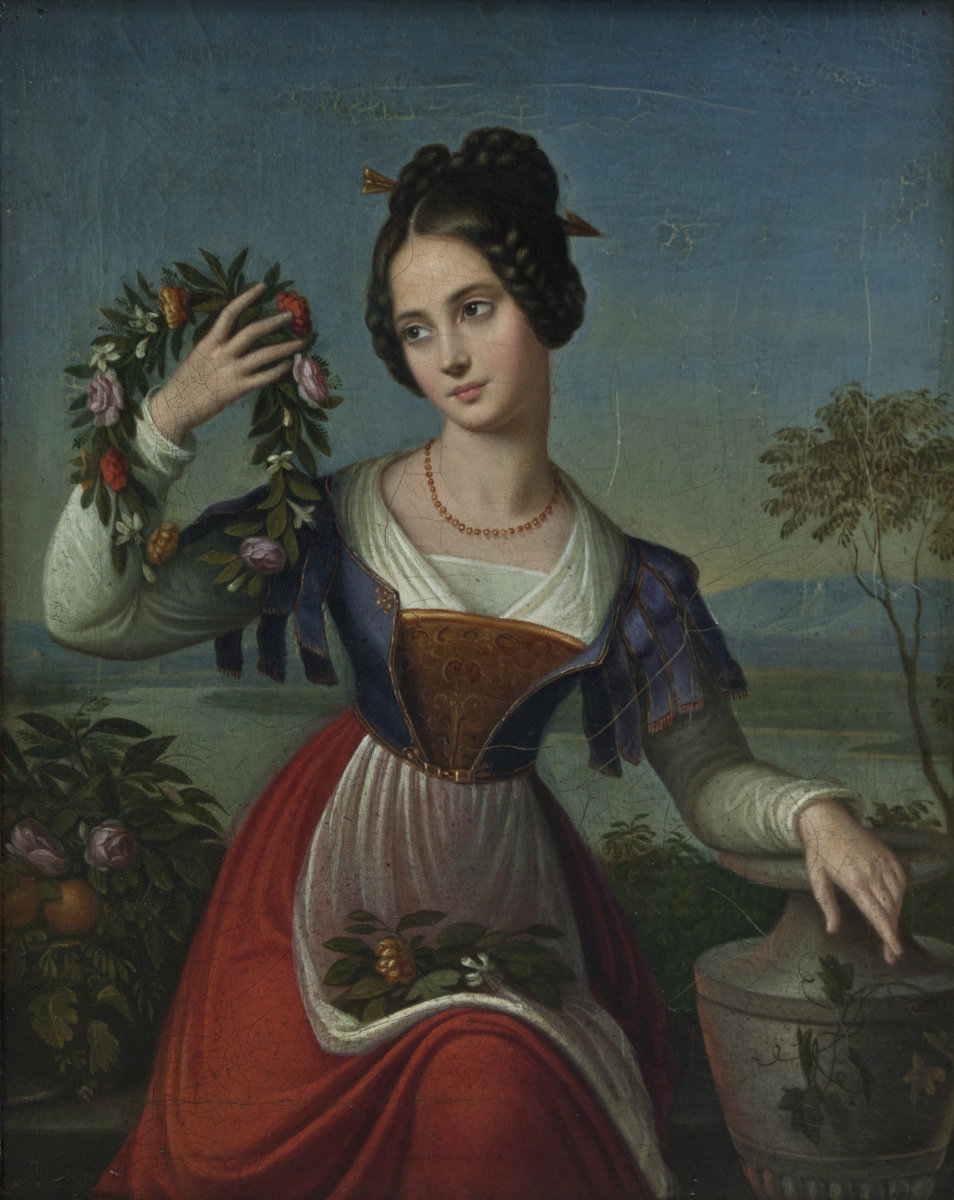
A possible model for this depiction was Maximiliane von Arnim, daughter of Bettina von Arnim

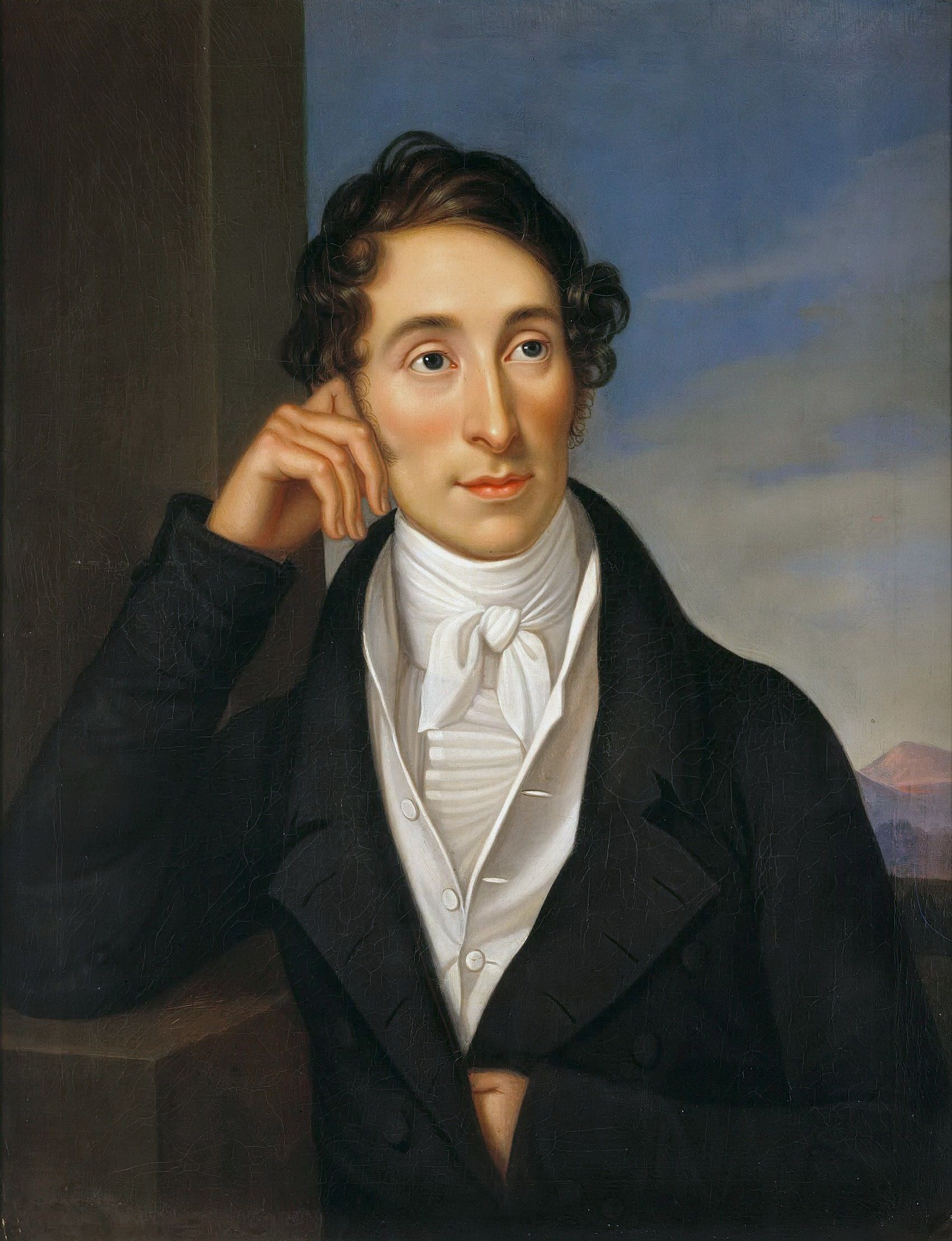
Carl Maria von Weber, 1821

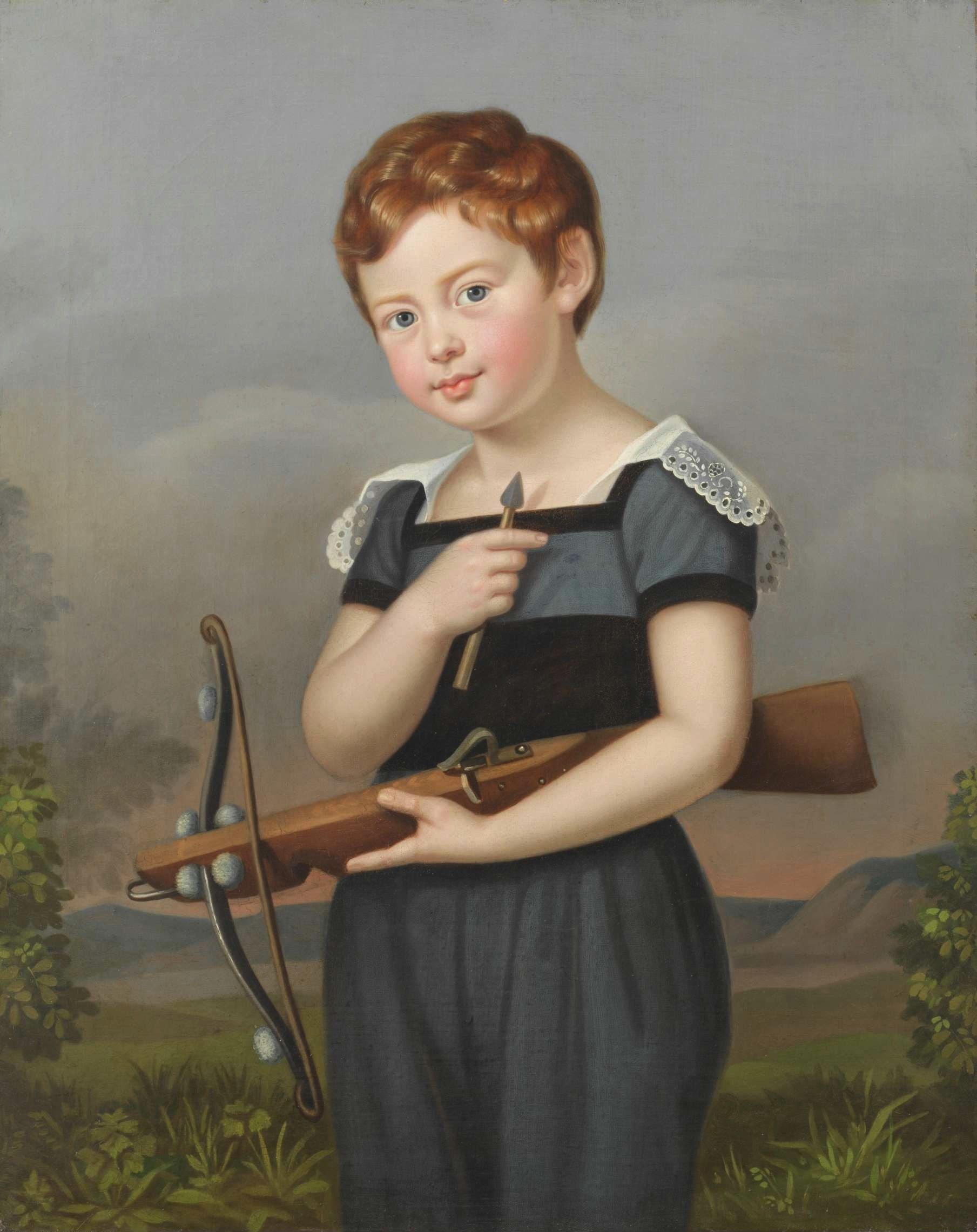
Raphael Oskar van Herzeele, 1817

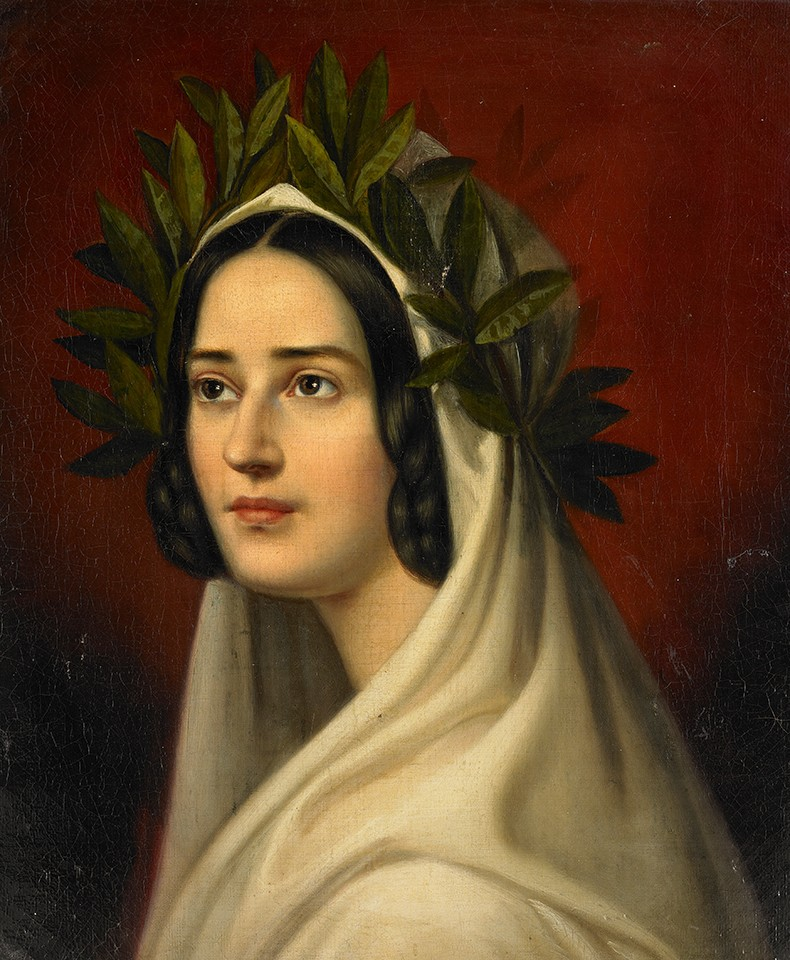
Maximiliane von Arnim, 1840/1843

== Bibliography ==
All of the following sources are in German.

- Wilhelmine Bardua: Jugendleben der Malerin Caroline Bardua. Mit dem Bildniß der Caroline Bardua. Nach einem Manuskript ihrer Schwester Wilhelmine Bardua herausgegeben von Walter Schwarz. Hoffmann, Breslau 1874.
- Hans Peper: Karoline Bardua. In: Mitteldeutsche Lebensbilder, 2nd volume Lebensbilder des 19. Jahrhunderts, Magdeburg 1927, pages 107–116.
- Wilhelmine Bardua: Die Schwestern Bardua. Bilder aus dem Gesellschafts-, Kunst- und Geistesleben der Biedermeierzeit. Aus Wilhelmine Barduas Aufzeichnungen gestaltet von Johannes Werner. Koehler & Amelang, Leipzig 1929.
- Pfarrer Jung, Mußbach: Auf den Spuren einer alten Hugenotten-Familie in Mußbach. Zum 200-jährigen Geburtstag von Johann Adam Pardua, geboren am 24. August 1739 in Mußbach-Lobloch. (Nach den Familienforschungen des Oberstleutnants der Gend. Bardua in Bad Ems). Buchdruckerei Carl Bockfeld, Neustadt an der Weinstraße 1939.
- Petra Wilhelmy-Dollinger: Caroline und Wilhelmine Bardua, zwei namhafte Ballenstedterinnen. Stadtverwaltung Ballenstedt 1993 (Kulturhistorische Schriften Ballenstedt. 1).
- Inga Leuwer-Bardua: Bardua. Deutsches Geschlechterbuch, Volume 206, Fünfundfünfzigster Allgemeiner Band, C.A. Starke, Limburg an der Lahn 1998, ISBN 3-7980-0206-1.
- Martin Stolzenau: Die Malerin Karoline Bardua porträtierte geistige Größen ihrer Zeit. In: Mitteldeutsche Zeitung. 20. Februar 2002.

== See also ==
- List of German painters
- List of German women artists
