= Oebisfelde-Calvörde =

Former collective municipality in Saxony-Anhalt, Germany

Coordinates: 52°26′N 10°59′E

Oebisfelde-Calvörde was a Verwaltungsgemeinschaft ("collective municipality") in the Börde district, in Saxony-Anhalt, Germany. It was situated east of Wolfsburg. The seat of the Verwaltungsgemeinschaft was in Oebisfelde. It was disbanded on 1 January 2010.

The Verwaltungsgemeinschaft Oebisfelde-Calvörde consisted of the following municipalities (population in 2006 between brackets):

1. Berenbrock (284)
2. Bösdorf (461)
3. Calvörde (1.777)
4. Dorst (174)
5. Eickendorf (200)
6. Etingen (512)
7. Grauingen (157)
8. Kathendorf (267)
9. Klüden (299)
10. Mannhausen (285)
11. Oebisfelde (7.295)
12. Rätzlingen (790)
13. Velsdorf (197)
14. Wegenstedt (398)
15. Wieglitz (191)
16. Zobbenitz (344)
