= Concertino (composition) =

Small or short concerto

Concertino is the diminutive of concerto, thus literally a small or short concerto. As there is no accepted scholarly definition of what comprises a concertino, the term is instead here defined by various examples from noted composers.

== Examples ==
Listed by composer:

- Hendrik Andriessen:
  - Concertino for oboe and string orchestra (1970)
  - Concertino for cello and chamber orchestra (1970)
- Jurriaan Andriessen:
  - Concertino for bassoon and winds (1962)
  - Concertino for piano and orchestra (1962)
  - Concertino for sousaphone and orchestra (1967)
- Alexander Arutiunian: Concertino for piano and orchestra (1951)
- Kees van Baaren: Concertino for piano and orchestra (1934)
- Henk Badings: Concertino for piano trio (violin, cello, and piano) and chamber orchestra (1942)
- Marion Bauer: Concertino for oboe, clarinet, and string quartet, Op. 32b
- Luciano Berio: Concertino for clarinet, violin, celesta, harp, and strings (1949, rev. 1951 and 1970)
- Henriëtte Bosmans: Concertino for piano and orchestra (1929)
- Ferrucio Busoni: Concertino for clarinet and small orchestra, BV 276 (Op. 48)
- Cécile Chaminade: Concertino for flute and orchestra in D major
- Ferdinand David: Trombone Concertino
- Hossein Dehlavi: Concertino for santur and orchestra
- Gaetano Donizetti: Concertino in G Major for cor anglais and orchestra (1817)
- Theodore Eisfeld: Concertino for clarinet and orchestra
- David Farquhar: Concertino for piano and strings (1960)
- Lorenzo Ferrero:
  - Three Baroque Buildings, concertino for trumpet, bassoon and string orchestra (1997)
  - Rastrelli in Saint Petersburg, concertino for oboe and string orchestra (2000)
  - Two Cathedrals in the South, concertino for trumpet and string orchestra (2001)
  - Guarini, the Master, concertino for violin and string orchestra (2004)
- Wolfgang Fortner: Concertino for viola and chamber orchestra (1934)
- Jean Françaix:
  - Concertino for piano and orchestra (1932)
  - Concertino for violin and orchestra (1954)
- Roberto Gerhard: Concertino for strings (1927–28)
- Peggy Glanville-Hicks:
  - Concertino da camera for flute, clarinet, bassoon, and piano (1945)
  - Concertino antico for harp and string quartet (1955)
- Michael Haydn: Concertino for trumpet and orchestra
- Hans Werner Henze: Concertino for piano, winds, and percussion (1947)
- Paul Hindemith: Concertino (or: Konzertstück) for trautonium and strings (1931)
- Gilad Hochman: Concertino for string orchestra and flute obbligato (2003)
- Jacques Ibert: Concertino da camera
- John Ireland: Concertino pastorale for string orchestra (1939)
- Leoš Janáček: Concertino for piano and chamber ensemble
- André Jolivet: Concertino for trumpet, strings and piano
- Nikolai Kapustin: Concertino for piano and orchestra, Op. 1 (1957)
- Julius Klengel: Concertino for cello in C major
- István Láng:
  - Concertino for xylophone and orchestra (1961, rev. 1967)
  - Concertino for soprano, trumpet, harp, violin, viola, cello, and electronics
- Lars-Erik Larsson:
  - Concertino No. 1 for flute and strings, Op. 45 No. 1 (1955)
  - Concertino No. 2 for oboe and strings, Op. 45 No. 2 (1955)
  - Concertino No. 3 for clarinet and strings, Op. 45 No. 3 (1957)
  - Concertino No. 4 for bassoon and strings, Op. 45 No. 4 (1955)
  - Concertino No. 5 for horn and strings, Op. 45 No. 5 (1955)
  - Concertino No. 6 for trumpet and strings, Op. 45 No. 6 (1953)
  - Concertino No. 7 for trombone and strings, Op. 45 No. 7 (1955)
  - Concertino No. 8 for violin and strings, Op. 45 No. 8 (1956)
  - Concertino No. 9 for viola and strings, Op. 45 No. 9 (1956)
  - Concertino No. 10 for cello and strings, Op. 45 No. 10 (1956)
  - Concertino No. 11 for double bass and strings, Op. 45 No. 11 (1957)
  - Concertino No. 12 for piano and strings, Op. 45 No. 12 (1957)
- Walter Leigh: Concertino for Harpsichord and String Orchestra
- Ursula Mamlok: Concertino for wind quintet, string orchestra, and percussion
- Bohuslav Martinů:
  - Concertino for cello and chamber ensemble (piccolo, 2 oboes, clarinet, bassoon, horn, trumpet, trombone, piano, timpani, drum, and cymbals) (1924)
  - Concertino for piano left hand and chamber orchestra (1926)
  - Concertino for piano trio and strings, H. 231 (1933)
  - Concertino for piano trio and strings, H. 232 (1933)
  - Concertino for piano and orchestra (1938)
- Darius Milhaud: Les quatre saisons:
  - Concertino de printemps for violin and chamber orchestra, Op. 135 (1934)
  - Concertino d'automne for two pianos and eight instruments, Op. 309 (1951)
  - Concertino d'été for viola and chamber orchestra, Op. 311 (1951)
  - Concertino d'hiver for trombone and string orchestra, Op. 327 (1953)
- Per Nørgård: Concertino No. 2 for piano solo (1950)
- Léon Orthel: Concertino alla burla for piano and orchestra, Op. 12 (1930)
- Vincent Persichetti: Concertino for piano and orchestra, Op. 16 (1941)
- Walter Piston: Concertino for piano and chamber orchestra (1937)
- Francis Poulenc: Concertino for piano four-hands (1931)
- Sergei Prokofiev: Cello Concertino
- Marcel Quinet:
  - Concertino for flute and orchestra (1959)
  - Concertino for oboe, clarinet, bassoon, and orchestra (1960)
  - Concertino for violin and orchestra (1970)
- Ned Rorem:
  - Concertino de Camera for harpsichord and small ensemble (1946)
- Albert Roussel: Concertino for cello and orchestra
- Gunther Schuller: Concertino for jazz quartet (vibraphone, piano, percussion, and double bass) and orchestra (1959)
- Roger Sessions: Concertino for chamber orchestra (1971–72)
- Dmitri Shostakovich: Concertino for two pianos, Op. 94 (1954)
- Nikos Skalkottas:
  - Concertino for solo oboe with piano accompaniment (1939)
  - Concertino for trumpet with piano accompaniment (190–42)
  - Concertino for piano and orchestra in C major (1948)
  - Concertino for two pianos and orchestra (1935)
- Richard Strauss: Duett-Concertino for clarinet, bassoon, strings and harp (1947)
- Igor Stravinsky: Concertino for string quartet (1920), also arrs. for piano four-hands, and for flute, oboe, cor anglais, clarinet, 2 bassons, 2 trumpets, 2 trombones, violin, and cello
- Carlos Surinach:
  - Concertino for piano, stings, and cymbals (1956)
  - Doppio Concertino for violin, piano, and nine instruments (1954)
- Germaine Tailleferre:
  - Concertino for harp and orchestra
  - Concertino for flute, piano and strings
- Virgil Thomson: Autumn, concertino for harp, strings, and percussion (1964)
- Erich Urbanner: Concertino for flute and orchestra (1959)
- Václav Jindřich Veit: Concertino for violin and orchestra, Op. 25 (1844)
- Carl Maria von Weber:
  - Concertino in E-flat major for clarinet and orchestra, Op. 26, J. 109 (1811)
  - Concertino in E minor for horn and orchestra, Op. 45
  - Konzertstück in F minor for piano and orchestra, Op. 79
- Ermanno Wolf-Ferrari:
  - Idillio-concertino in A major for oboe, two horns, and strings, Op. 15 (1933)
  - Suite-concertino in F major for bassoon, two horns, and strings, Op. 16 (1933)
  - Concertino in A♭ major for cor anglais, two horns, and strings, Op. 34 (1947)
- Arthur Wood: Concertino in A major for flute and orchestra (1948)
- Isang Yun: Concertino for accordion and string quartet (1983)
