= Classic 100 Music of France =

In 2012, the Australian radio station ABC Classic FM held a Classic 100 Music of France countdown.

The selection of works that were available in the survey was determined between 14 July 2012 and 17 August 2012 (with the public being able to add works to the list initiated by the station). Voting (by the public) for the finalised list of works was held between 22 August 2012 and 14 September 2012. Each voter could select up to five works from the list of available pieces.

On 30 September Pinchgut Opera held a special concert "Music of France" at the Old Courts at the Art Gallery of New South Wales to celebrate the countdown, along with a private viewing of the exhibition Eugène Atget: Old Paris. The concert was broadcast on ABC Classic FM and via the Internet on 3 October 2012.

The broadcast of the countdown commenced on 8 October 2012 and continued until 14 October 2012.

== Countdown results ==
The results of countdown are as follows:

Rank	Composer	Work	Genre	Instrumentation	Year
100	Satie, Erik	"Je te veux" (Note: Music broadcast for number 100: The piano solo version was first broadcast, however the version for voice (sung by Juliette Noureddine) was later played.)	Song	Piano, voice	1903
99	Debussy, Claude	Petite suite, L. 65	Suite	Piano (four hands)	1889
98	Berlioz, Hector	Roméo et Juliette (Note: Music broadcast for number 98: Orchestral interludes.)	Symphony	Orchestra, chorus	1839
97	Messiaen, Olivier	Vingt regards sur l'enfant-Jésus (Note: Music broadcast for number 97: "Gaze of the Father", "Gaze of the heights" and "Gaze of time".)	Suite	Piano	1944
96	Fauré, Gabriel	Dolly Suite (Note: Music broadcast for number 96: Orchestral version of the suite, scored by Henri Rabaud in 1906.)	Suite	Piano (four hands)	1896
95	Saint-Saëns, Camille	Violin Concerto No. 3 in B minor, Op. 61	Concerto	Violin	1880
94	Poulenc, Francis	Gloria, FP 177	Mass	Orchestra, chorus, soprano	1961
93	Bolling, Claude	Suite for Flute and Jazz Piano Trio (Note: Music broadcast for number 93: "Irlandaise".)	Suite	Flute, piano, string bass, drums	1973
92	Hahn, Reynaldo	"À Chloris"	Song	Piano, voice	1913
91	Massenet, Jules	Manon (Note: Music broadcast for number 91: Act 1.)	Opera	Orchestra, chorus	1884
90	Berlioz, Hector	Les troyens (Note: Music broadcast for number 91: Excerpts from Acts 1 and 4.)	Opera	Orchestra, chorus	1858
89	Ravel, Maurice	Gaspard de la nuit	Suite	Piano	1908
88	Ravel, Maurice	Rapsodie espagnole	Rhapsody	Orchestra	1907
87	Franck, César	Violin Sonata in A major, M. 8 (Note: Music broadcast for number 87: Version for cello. Movement 4. Also see number 38 in the countdown.)	Sonata	Cello, piano	1886
86	Berlioz, Hector	Le carnaval romain, Op. 9	Overture	Orchestra	1843
85	Chaminade, Cécile	Concertino for flute and orchestra in D major, Op. 107	Concerto	Flute	1902
84	Franck, César	Variations symphoniques, M. 46	Symphonic variations	Piano, orchestra	1885
83	Berlioz, Hector	La damnation de Faust (Note: Music broadcast for number 83: Exceprts from Parts 1 and 2.)	Dramatic legend	Orchestra, chorus, solo voices	1846
82	Saint-Saëns, Camille	Introduction and Rondo Capriccioso in A minor, Op. 28	Introduction, rondo	Violin, orchestra	1863
81	Rouget de Lisle, Claude	"La Marseillaise"	Anthem	Orchestra	1792
80	Debussy, Claude	Images, Set 1, L. 110	Impressionist	Piano	1905
79	Lully, Jean-Baptiste	Le bourgeois gentilhomme	Suite	Orchestra	1670
78	Debussy, Claude	Pelléas et Mélisande, L. 88 (Note: Music broadcast for number 78: Act 5.)	Opera	Orchestra, chorus	1902
77	Ravel, Maurice	Ma mère l'oye	Suite	Orchestra	1911
76	Couperin, François	Les baricades mistérieuses	Rondo	Harpsichord	1717
75	Lalo, Édouard	Symphonie espagnole in D minor, Op. 21	Concerto	Violin	1874
74	Fauré, Gabriel	Sicilienne, Op. 78	Siciliana	Piano, cello	1898
73	Gounod, Charles	Messe solennelle à Sainte Cécile	Mass	Orchestra, chorus	1855
72	Poulenc, Francis	Flute sonata, FP. 164	Sonata	Flute, piano	1957
71	Boieldieu, François-Adrien	Harp concerto in C major	Concerto	Harp	1801
70	Debussy, Claude	Deux arabesques, L. 66	Arabesque	Piano	1891
69	Saint-Saëns, Camille	Cello Concerto No. 1 in A minor, Op. 33	Concerto	Cello	1872
68	Berlioz, Hector	Te Deum, Op. 22 / H.118	Te Deum	Orchestra, chorus	1849
67	Charpentier, Marc-Antoine	Te Deum, H. 146 (Note: Music broadcast for number 67: Excerpts.)	Te Deum	Orchestra, chorus	1698
66	Godard, Benjamin	"Oh! ne t'éveille pas encore" from Jocelyn	Aria	Orchestra, tenor	1888
65	Rameau, Jean-Phillipe	Les Indes galantes (Note: Music broadcast for number 65: Orchestral suite from the opera-ballet.)	Opera-ballet	Orchestra, chorus	1736
64	Litolff, Henry	Concerto Symphonique No. 4 in D minor, Op. 102 (Note: Music broadcast for number 64: Scherzo.)	Concerto	Piano	1852
63	Debussy, Claude	Cello Sonata, L. 135	Sonata	Cello, piano	1915
62	Ravel, Maurice	Piano Concerto for the Left Hand in D major	Concerto	Piano	1930
61	Offenbach, Jacques	Gaîté parisienne (Note: Music broadcast for number 61: Excerpts.)	Ballet	Orchestra	1938
60	Duruflé, Maurice	Requiem, Op. 9 (Note: Music broadcast for number 60: Excerpts (but "the bulk").)	Mass, Requiem	Orchestra, chorus	1947
59	Jarre, Maurice	Lawrence of Arabia soundtrack (Note: Music broadcast for number 59: Excerpts.)	Soundtrack	Orchestra	1962
58	Jarre, Maurice	Doctor Zhivago soundtrack (Note: Music broadcast for number 58: Excerpts.)	Soundtrack	Orchestra	1965
57	Poulenc, Francis	Organ Concerto in G minor	Concerto	Organ, timpani, strings	1938
56	Debussy, Claude	String Quartet in G minor, Op. 10, L. 85	String quartet	Strings	1893
55	Ravel, Maurice	Piano Trio in A minor	Trio	Piano, violin, cello	1914
54	Ravel, Maurice	Shéhérazade	Song cycle	Orchestra, soprano (or tenor)	1903
53	Berlioz, Hector	Grande messe des morts, Op. 5	Mass, Requiem	Orchestra, chorus	1837
52	Berlioz, Hector	L'enfance du Christ, Op. 25 (Note: Music broadcast for number 52: Part 2.)	Oratorio	Orchestra, chorus	1854
51	Messiaen, Olivier	Turangalîla-Symphonie (Note: Music broadcast for number 51: First six movements.)	Symphony	Orchestra, piano	1948
50	Ravel, Maurice	Le tombeau de Couperin (Note: Music broadcast for number 50: Orchestrated version of the 1917 piano suite.)	Suite	Orchestra	1919
49	Debussy, Claude	Nocturnes, L. 91	Impressionist	Orchestra, chorus (female)	1899
48	Franck, César	Panis angelicus	Hymn	Orchestra, chorus	1872
47	Marais, Marin	Sonnerie de Ste-Geneviève du Mont-de-Paris	Chaconne	Viol, violin, harpsichord, basso continuo	1723
46	Fauré, Gabriel	"Clair de lune", Op. 46, No. 2	Song	Voice, piano	1887
45	Berlioz, Hector	Harold en Italie, Op. 16	Symphony	Orchestra	1834
44	Berlioz, Hector	Les nuits d'été (Note: Music broadcast for number 44: Orchestrated version of the 1841 original piano and voice song cycle.)	Song cycle	Orchestra, soprano	1846
43	Saint-Saëns, Camille	Piano Concerto No. 5 in F major, Op. 103	Concerto	Piano	1896
42	Franck, César	Symphony in D minor, M. 48	Symphony	Orchestra	1888
41	Saint-Saëns, Camille	Piano Concerto No. 2 in G minor, Op. 22	Concerto	Piano	1868
40	Debussy, Claude	Children's Corner, L. 103	Suite	Piano	1908
39	Chabrier, Emmanuel	España	Impressionist	Orchestra	1883
38	Franck, César	Violin Sonata in A major, M. 8 (Note: Music broadcast for number 38: Original version (for violin). Also see number 87 in the countdown.)	Sonata	Violin, piano	1886
37	Adam, Adolphe	Giselle (Note: Music broadcast for number 37: Excerpts.)	Ballet	Orchestra	1841
36	Bizet, Georges	Symphony in C major	Symphony	Orchestra	1855
35	Berlioz, Hector	"La Marseillaise" (arrangement)	Arrangement	Orchestra, chorus	1830
34	Offenbach, Jacques	Orphée aux enfers (Note: Music broadcast for number 34: Excerpts.)	Operetta	Orchestra, chorus	1858
33	Gounod, Charles	Ave Maria (on a Bach prelude in C major)	Song	Piano, voice	1853
32	Gounod, Charles	Faust (Note: Music broadcast for number 32: Excerpts from Act 4.)	Opera	Orchestra, chorus	1859
31	Ravel, Maurice	Daphnis et Chloé	Ballet	Orchestra, chorus	1912
30	Fauré, Gabriel	Cantique de Jean Racine, Op. 11	Cantata	Orchestra, organ	1865
29	Saint-Saëns, Camille	Samson et Dalila (Note: Music broadcast for number 29: Excerpts from Acts 2 and 3.)	Opera	Orchestra, chorus	1877
28	Delibes, Léo	Coppélia (Note: Music broadcast for number 28: Act 1.)	Ballet	Orchestra	1870
27	Bizet, Georges	L'Arlésienne (Note: Music broadcast for number 27: Suite compiled by Bizet from his incidental music.)	Suite	Orchestra	1872
26	Dukas, Paul	L'apprenti sorcier	Symphonic poem	Orchestra	1897
25	Adam, Adolphe	"Cantique de Noël"	Carol	Orchestra, chorus	1847
24	Messiaen, Olivier	Quatuor pour la fin du temps (Note: Music broadcast for number 24: First five movements.)	Quartet	Clarinet, violin, cello, piano	1941
23	Fauré, Gabriel	Pavane in F-sharp minor, Op. 50	Dance	Orchestra, flute	1887
22	Satie, Erik	Trois Gnossiennes	Dance	Piano	1890
21	Ravel, Maurice	Piano Concerto in G major	Concerto	Piano	1931
20	Ravel, Maurice	String Quartet in F major	Quartet	Strings	1903
19	Widor, Charles-Marie	Symphony for Organ No. 5 in F minor, Op. 42, No. 1 (Note: Music broadcast for number 19: Movement 5 (Toccata).)	Symphony	Organ	1879
18	Debussy, Claude	Préludes, Book 1, L. 117 (Note: Music broadcast for number 18: * La fille aux cheveux de lin * La sérénade interrompue * La cathédrale engloutie * La danse de Puck * Minstrels.)	Impressionist	Piano	1910
17	Offenbach, Jacques	Les contes d'Hoffmann (Note: Music broadcast for number 17: Excerpts.)	Opera	Orchestra, chorus	1881
16	Saint-Saëns, Camille	Danse macabre	Tone poem	Orchestra	1874
15	Delibes, Léo	Lakmé (Note: Music broadcast for number 15: Flower Duet (Act 1) and Bell Song (Act 2).)	Opera	Orchestra, chorus	1882
14	Massenet, Jules	Thaïs (Note: Music broadcast for number 14: The Intermezzo (Méditation), and an excerpt from the end of the opera.)	Opera	Orchestra, chorus	1894
13	Ravel, Maurice	Pavane pour une infante défunte (Note: Music broadcast for number 13: Version orchestrated by Ravel from his 1899 piano original.)	Dance	Orchestra	1910
12	Debussy, Claude	La mer, L. 109	Impressionist	Orchestra	1905
11	Debussy, Claude	Suite bergamasque, L. 75	Suite	Piano	1905
10	Saint-Saëns, Camille	Le carnaval des animaux (Note: Music broadcast for number 10: An "Australianised" narrated version.)	Suite	Orchestra	1886
9	Ravel, Maurice	Boléro	Dance	Orchestra	1928
8	Canteloube, Joseph	Chants d'Auvergne (Note: Music broadcast for number 8: Excerpts.)	Songs	Orchestra, soprano	1930
7	Berlioz, Hector	Symphonie fantastique, Op. 14	Symphony	Orchestra	1830
6	Debussy, Claude	Prélude à l'après-midi d'un faune, L. 86	Symphonic Poem	Orchestra	1894
5	Bizet, Georges	Au fond du temple saint	Aria	Orchestra, tenor, baritone	1863
4	Satie, Erik	Gymnopédies	Impressionist	Piano	1890
3	Fauré, Gabriel	Requiem in D minor, Op. 48	Mass	Orchestra, chorus	1890
2	Saint-Saëns, Camille	Symphony No. 3 in C minor, Op. 78	Symphony	Orchestra, organ	1886
1	Bizet, Georges	Carmen (Note: Music broadcast for number 1: Excerpts during the countdown, and the complete opera performed in the evening.)	Opera	Orchestra, chorus	1875

== Programming ==
For more information about the works broadcast (including performers and recording details), see ABC Classic FM's programming notes:

- Day 1: Numbers 100 to 84
- Day 2: Numbers 83 to 69
- Day 3: Numbers 68 to 54
- Day 4: Numbers 53 to 43
- Day 5: Numbers 42 to 29
- Day 6: Numbers 28 to 10
- Day 7: Numbers 9 to 1

== By composer ==
The following 34 composers featured in the countdown:

Composer	Works in countdown
Adam, Adolphe	2
Berlioz, Hector	11
Bizet, Georges	4
Boieldieu, François-Adrien	1
Canteloube, Joseph	1
Bolling, Claude	1
Chabrier, Emmanuel	1
Chaminade, Cécile	1
Charpentier, Marc-Antoine	1
Couperin, François	1
Debussy, Claude	12
Delibes, Léo	2
Dukas, Paul	1
Duruflé, Maurice	1
Fauré, Gabriel	6
Franck, César	5
Godard, Benjamin	1
Gounod, Charles	3
Hahn, Reynaldo	1
Jarre, Maurice	2
Lalo, Édouard	1
Litolff, Henry	1
Lully, Jean-Baptiste	1
Marais, Marin	1
Massenet, Jules	2
Messiaen, Olivier	3
Offenbach, Jacques	3
Poulenc, Francis	3
Rameau, Jean-Philippe	1
Ravel, Maurice	12
Rouget de Lisle, Claude	1
Saint-Saëns, Camille	9
Satie, Erik	3
Widor, Charles-Marie	1

== See also ==
- Classic 100 Countdowns
- List of French classical composers (chronological)
