= Genovefa Weber =

German opera singer

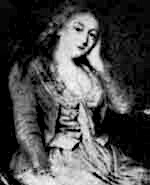
- Born: Genovefa Brenner; 2 January 1764; Oberdorf
- Died: 13 March 1798 (aged 34); Salzburg
- Occupations: Opera singer; Actress
- Known for: Carl Maria von Weber's mother
- Spouse: Franz Anton von Weber
- Parent(s): Marx Brenner; Maria Victoria Hindelang

Genovefa Weber or von Weber (née Brenner; 2 January 1764 – 13 March 1798) was a German opera singer and actress. She was born in Oberdorf, Allgäu, Holy Roman Empire and died in Salzburg, Holy Roman Empire. She was the mother of composer Carl Maria von Weber.

== Life ==
Genovefa was baptized into the Roman Catholic faith in Oberdorf (today's Marktoberdorf). At the time she was born, the castle in Oberdorf was the summer residence of Prince-Bishopric of Augsburg, Prince Clemens Wenceslaus of Saxony. She was the fourth child of Marx Brenner, a carpenter working at the Prince Bishop's court, and Maria Victoria Hindelang.

On 20 August 1785, at the age of 21, Genovefa married the 51 year old Franz Anton von Weber (1734-1812) at Schottenkirche, a parish church in Vienna. It was Weber's second marriage. He had two daughters and two sons from his first marriage; and three children with Genovefa. Two of their children died in the childhood.

Franz Anton was in the official service of the Prince-Bishopric of Hildesheim, after which he served as a military officer in the service of the Duchy of Holstein, then, as a music director of a traveling theater group, before became a Kapellmeister at the Princely Court in Eutin, a district capital of Eastern Holstein. Franz Anton was a member of the Freemasons. His brother, Fridolin Weber, who died in 1785, was the father of Mozart's wife, Constanze. Through her marriage to Franz Anton, Genovefa became Constanze Mozart's aunt.

Franz Anton met Genovefa during summer in Vienna of 1783 when he visited his two sons from his first marriage, Fridolin d. J. and Edmund. They were the students of Joseph Haydn. At that time, Genovefa was working as a singer in Vienna. She studied acting and singing under Joseph Lange, and Vincenzo Righini, who was a Kapellmeister in Vienna.

After their marriage, Franz Anton and Genovefa moved to Eutin with the two sons of his first marriage. On 18 or 19 November 1786, Genovefa gave birth to her first son, Carl Maria von Weber. Carl Maria's interest in music was nurtured from a very young age and heavily influenced by his parents’ musical activities. Soon after the birth of Carl Maria in 1787, Genovefa and her husband moved to Hamburg. In 1789, Franz Anton founded a traveling theater company. Their children grew up in the traveling theater environment. Carl Maria was less than five years old when he performed on the stage for the first time. The family gave many performances from Meiningen in 1789, to Nuremberg, Erlangen, Ansbach and Bayreuth from 1791 to 1794, and later to Hildburghausen, Rudolstadt and Weimar in 1794. During this period, Genovefa gave birth to Georg Friedrich Carl in 1789 and Maria Adelheid Antonia in 1797. Georg Friedrich died during infancy while Maria Adelheid died when she was a year old.

While staying in Hildburghausen, Genovefa became severely ill. Due to her illness, her family did not travel frequently for performances. In 1796, Carl Maria continued his piano lessons with Johann Peter Heuschkel (1773-1853) in Hildburghausen.

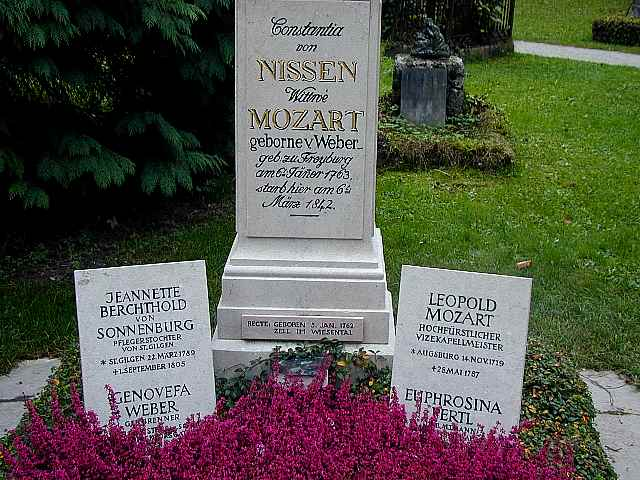
Memorial of Genovefa Weber at St. Sebastian church in Salzburg.

In 1794, Genovefa appeared regularly as a singer in several roles at Johann Wolfgang von Goethe's theater in Weimar. On 5 September 1794, Franz Anton sent a letter from Rudolstadt to Goethe, requesting his wife's early dismissal from her contract. Quoted in his letter, "During the employment, there were so many infinitesimal disorder and things which did not allow us to stay longer". Goethe responded to the request in his letter reply dated 23 September 1794.

At the end of 1797, Weber family moved to Salzburg. Franz Anton had a brief appointment as Kapellmeister and as an impresario, while Carl Maria acquired basic knowledge of the sentence technique of music counterpoint with Michael Haydn, the younger brother of Joseph Haydn.

Genovefa Weber died of tuberculosis at age 34 on 13 March 1798 in Salzburg. She did not have the opportunity to experience Carl Maria's first published work, a series of six fughetta for piano, which he wrote at the age of 12, the same year she died. Her memorial is located at the cemetery of St. Sebastian, Salzburg in an artificial "family grave" of Mozart, created by Johann Evangelist Engl in 1901.

Genoveva-Brenner-Weg is a street in her birthplace, Marktoberdorf, that was named after her to honor her contributions in music.
