= Carl Maria von Weber =

German composer (1786–1826)

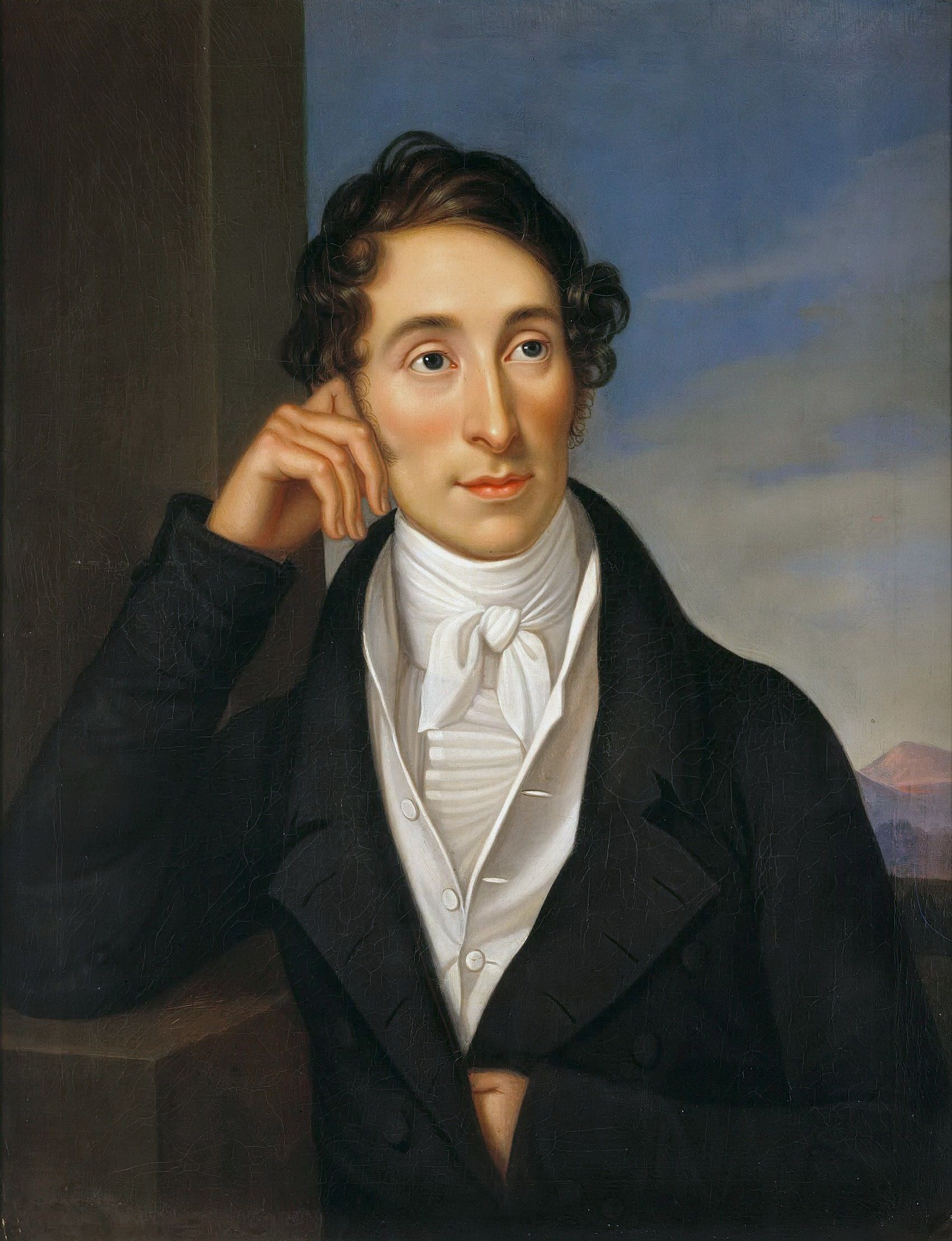
- Portrait by Caroline Bardua, 1821
- Born: Carl Maria Friedrich Ernst von Weber; 18/19 November 1786; Eutin, Prince-Bishopric of Lübeck, Holy Roman Empire
- Died: 5 June 1826 (aged 39); London, England, United Kingdom
- Occupations: Composer; conductor; pianist; guitarist; music critic
- Works: List of compositions

Carl Maria Friedrich Ernst von Weber (18/19 November 1786 – 5 June 1826) was a German composer, conductor, virtuoso pianist, guitarist, and critic in the late Classical and early Romantic eras. Best known for his operas, he was a crucial figure in the development of German Romantische Oper (German Romantic opera).

Throughout his youth, his father, Franz Anton, relentlessly moved the family between Hamburg, Salzburg, Freiberg, Augsburg and Vienna. Consequently, he studied with many teachers—his father, Johann Peter Heuschkel, Michael Haydn, Giovanni Valesi, Johann Nepomuk Kalcher, and Georg Joseph Vogler—under whose supervision he composed four operas, none of which survive complete. He had a modest output of non-operatic music, which includes two symphonies, two concertos and a concertino for clarinet and orchestra, a bassoon concerto, a horn concertino, two concertos and a Konzertstück for piano and orchestra, piano pieces such as Invitation to the Dance; and many pieces that featured the clarinet, usually written for the virtuoso clarinetist Heinrich Baermann.

His mature operas—Silvana (1810), Abu Hassan (1811), Der Freischütz (1821), Die drei Pintos (comp. 1820–21), Euryanthe (1823), Oberon (1826)—had a major impact on subsequent German composers including Marschner, Meyerbeer, and Wagner; his compositions for piano influenced those of Mendelssohn, Chopin and Liszt. His best known work, Der Freischütz, remains among the most significant German operas.

== Life and career ==
=== Childhood ===
Carl Maria Friedrich Ernst von Weber was born around 18 November 1786 in Eutin, Bishopric of Lübeck. He was the eldest of the three children of Franz Anton von Weber and his second wife, Genovefa Brenner, a Viennese singer. He was baptized Catholic on 20 November 1786 with the name Carl Friedrich Ernst; the alternative second name Maria appeared only later. His brother and sister died in infancy. Both parents were Catholic and originally came from the far south of Germany. The "von" was an affectation of his father's, who was not an aristocrat and who claimed descent from a south German noble family which was already extinct at the time.

In April 1779, Franz Anton had been appointed director of the prince-bishopric orchestra, Eutin, which, however, was dissolved in 1781 because of spending cuts. He then took the position of Eutin's municipal music director. Dissatisfied with this position, he resigned in 1787 and founded a theatre company in Hamburg. After a brief stay in Vienna, he joined the theatre company of Johann Friedrich Toscani (husband of Elisabeth Toscani) and Peter Carl Santorini, who performed in Kassel, Marburg, and Hofgeismar. He tried repeatedly to establish a lasting company of his own but had only intermittent success.

Franz Anton's half-brother, Franz Fridolin Weber, married Cäcilia Stamm and had four daughters—Josepha, Aloysia, Constanze, and Sophie—all of whom became notable singers. Wolfgang Amadeus Mozart attempted to woo Aloysia, composing several pieces for her. After she rejected his advances, Mozart went on to marry Constanze; thus Mozart's wife was a cousin of Carl Maria von Weber.

A gifted violinist, Franz Anton had ambitions of turning Weber into a child prodigy like Mozart. Weber was born with a congenital hip disorder and did not begin to walk until he was four. But by then, he was already a capable singer and pianist.

=== Education ===
Franz Anton gave Weber a comprehensive education, which was frequently interrupted by the family's moves. In 1796, Weber continued his musical education in Hildburghausen, Thuringia, where he was instructed by the oboist Johann Peter Heuschkel. After moving to Salzburg in autumn 1797, Weber studied from 1798 with Michael Haydn, younger brother of the better-known Joseph Haydn, who agreed to teach Weber free of charge.

His time in Salzburg was overshadowed by the death of his mother Genovefa, who succumbed to tuberculosis on 13 March 1798, and that of his one-year-old sister Antonetta on 29 December 1798 in Munich. After the death of Carl's mother, his paternal aunt Adelaide took over the care of him.

A visit to Joseph Haydn in Vienna, presumably in hope of advanced teaching, was fruitless. In autumn 1798, Weber moved to Munich where he studied singing with Johann Evangelist Wallishauser and composing with Johann Nepomuk Kalcher, who supervised Weber's first opera, Die Macht der Liebe und des Weins (The Power of Love and Wine). Like his other compositions of that period, this opera is lost. Six fughettas for piano of the twelve-year-old Weber were published in Leipzig.

Weber's musical education was extended by a mastering of lithography which he learned in the workshop of Alois Senefelder (the inventor of the process) and Franz Gleißner (autumn 1799). A set of his Variations for the Pianoforte was lithographed by Weber himself.

In 1800, the family moved to Freiberg in Saxony, where Weber, then 14 years old, wrote an opera called Das stumme Waldmädchen (The Silent Forest Maiden). It was produced at the Freiberg and Chemnitz theatres and later in Saint Petersburg (1804), Vienna (1804/1805) and Prague (1806). The young Weber also began to publish articles as a music critic, for example in the Leipziger Neue Zeitung in 1801.

In 1801, the family returned to Salzburg, where Weber resumed his studies with Michael Haydn. Weber composed his third opera Peter Schmoll und seine Nachbarn (Peter Schmoll and His Neighbours) of which his teacher approved. After a concert tour in 1802 the Webers returned to Augsburg where it is believed Peter Schmoll premiered.

In mid 1803, Weber continued his studies in Vienna with Abbé Vogler, founder of important music schools in Mannheim, Stockholm, and Darmstadt. Another famous pupil of Vogler in Darmstadt was Jakob Meyer Beer, later known as Giacomo Meyerbeer, who became a close friend of Weber. In letters they addressed each other as "brother".

=== Early career 1804–1810 ===
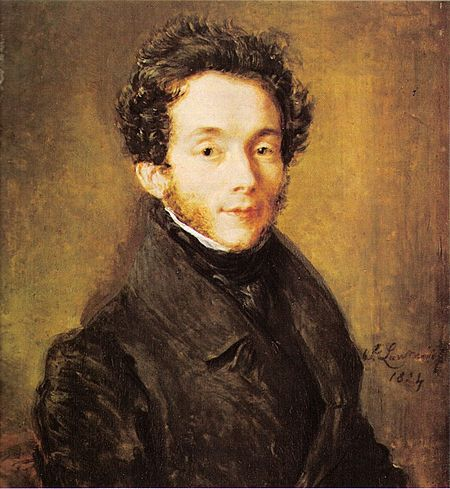
Carl Maria von Weber (1814) Painting by Thomas Lawrence

Vogler recommended the 17-year-old Weber for the post of Director at the Breslau Opera in 1804; Weber was offered and accepted the post. He sought to reform the Opera by pensioning off older singers, expanding the orchestra, and tackling a more challenging repertoire. His ambitious and dedicated work as director of the orchestra was acknowledged, though his tempi were frequently criticized as too fast. As the daily routine did not leave sufficient time for his own creative work, Weber did not seek to extend his two-year appointment.

After an interlude at the court of Duke Eugen of Württemberg, who resided in Silesia, Weber served from 1807 to 1810 in Stuttgart as private secretary to Duke Ludwig, brother of King Frederick I of Württemberg. Weber's time in Württemberg was plagued with troubles. He fell deeply into debt and became entangled in the financial manipulations of his employer, e.g. the sale of confirmations of ducal service which exempted the purchaser from military service. Weber was arrested and charged with embezzlement and bribery. As he could disprove the allegations, the case was brought under civil law to avoid compromising the de facto manipulator, the brother of the king. Weber agreed to pay the costs (the last payment was made in 1816) and was banished from Württemberg together with his father.

Weber kept a diary from February 26, 1810 to three days before he died. It lists his expenses and correspondence, and makes some comments on events in his life.

Weber remained prolific as a composer during this period, writing a quantity of religious music, mainly for the Catholic mass. This, however, earned him the hostility of conservatives working for the re-establishment of traditional chant in liturgy. In his biography of Weber, Warrack notes that Weber was an accomplished guitarist. It was in this year that his first song with guitar accompaniment, "Liebeszauber", was printed. Some of his most original and innovative songs were written during the following years, including "Er an Sie" (1808) and "Was zieht zu deinem Zauberkreise" (1809).

=== Later career 1810–1826 ===
In 1810, Weber visited several cities throughout Germany; 1811 was a pivotal year in his career when he met and worked with the Munich court clarinetist Heinrich Baermann and composed the Concertino in E♭ Major, Op. 26, J. 109, and the two concerti J. 114 and J. 118 for him; from December 1811 through March 1812, Weber went on tour with Baermann playing the clarinet works, and it was some of the final concerts on this tour that changed public, critical, and royal opinions of Weber's work, and helped him to mount a successful performance of Silvana in Berlin later that year.

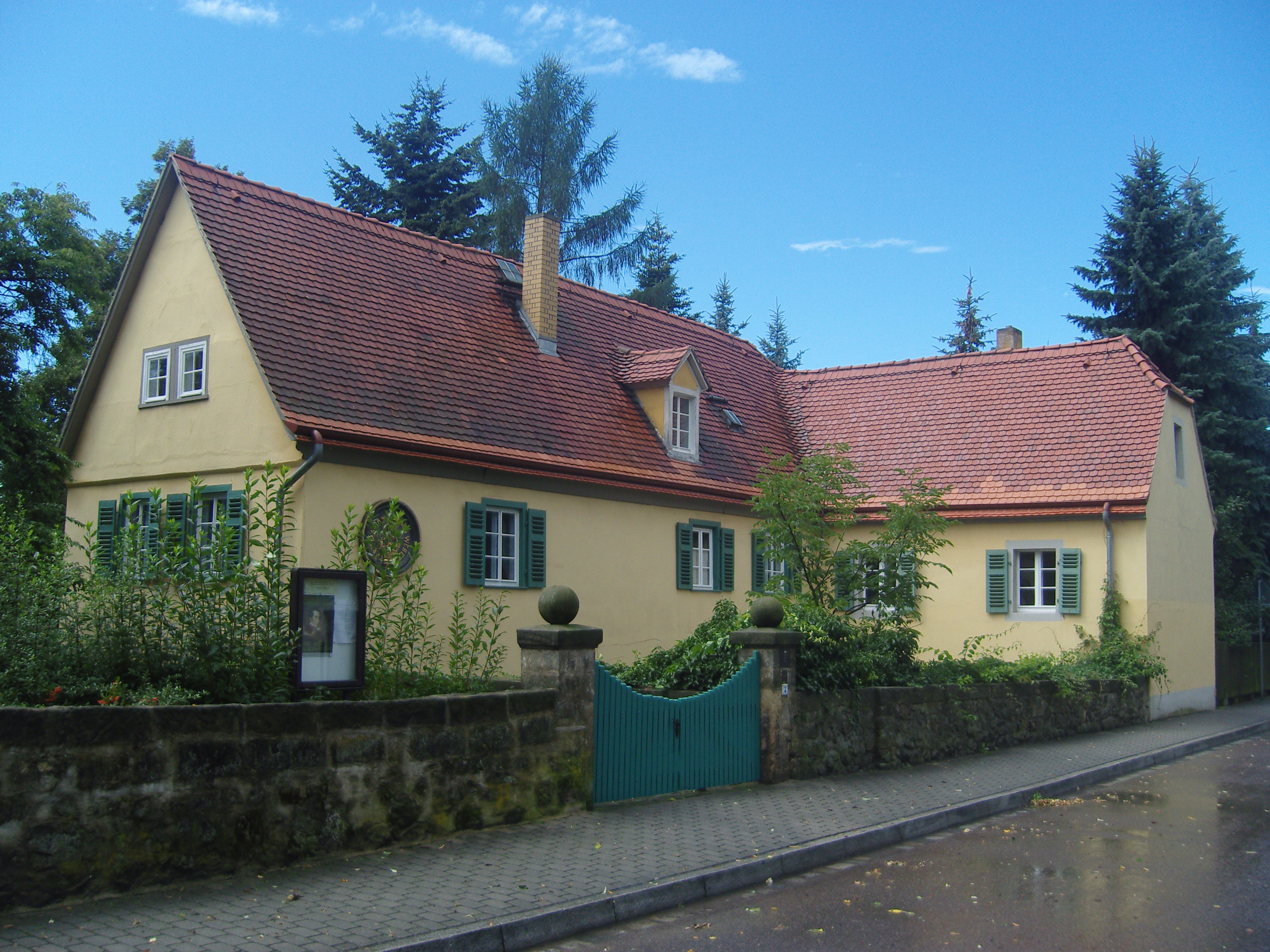
Weber's summer home (1818–1824) near Dresden; the Carl Maria von Weber Museum

From 1813 to 1816, he was director of the Opera in Prague; from 1816 to 1817 he worked in Berlin, and from 1817 onwards he was director of the prestigious Opera in Dresden, working hard to establish a German opera, in reaction to the Italian opera which had dominated the European music scene since the 18th century. He was inspired in this endeavour by the ideals of the Sturm und Drang period, and also by the German folk song collection "Des Knaben Wunderhorn" by Arnim and Brentano. It was in 1816 that he wrote the Duet Op. 38 for guitar and piano, possibly inspired by similar works printed in Vienna by such composers as Hummel and Diabelli. On 4 November 1817, he married Caroline Brandt, a singer who created the title role of Silvana. In 1818, in Dresden on the 20th of September, he premiered his Jubel-Ouvertüre ('Jubilee Overture'), incorporating God Save the King at its climax, though this theme is earlier than Weber. Page 552 of the 1745 October issue of The Gentleman’s Magazine prints the melody in musical notation, with the opening words “God save great George our King". The Jubilee itself celebrates Frederick Augustus I of Saxony. In 1819, he wrote perhaps his most famous piano piece, Invitation to the Dance.

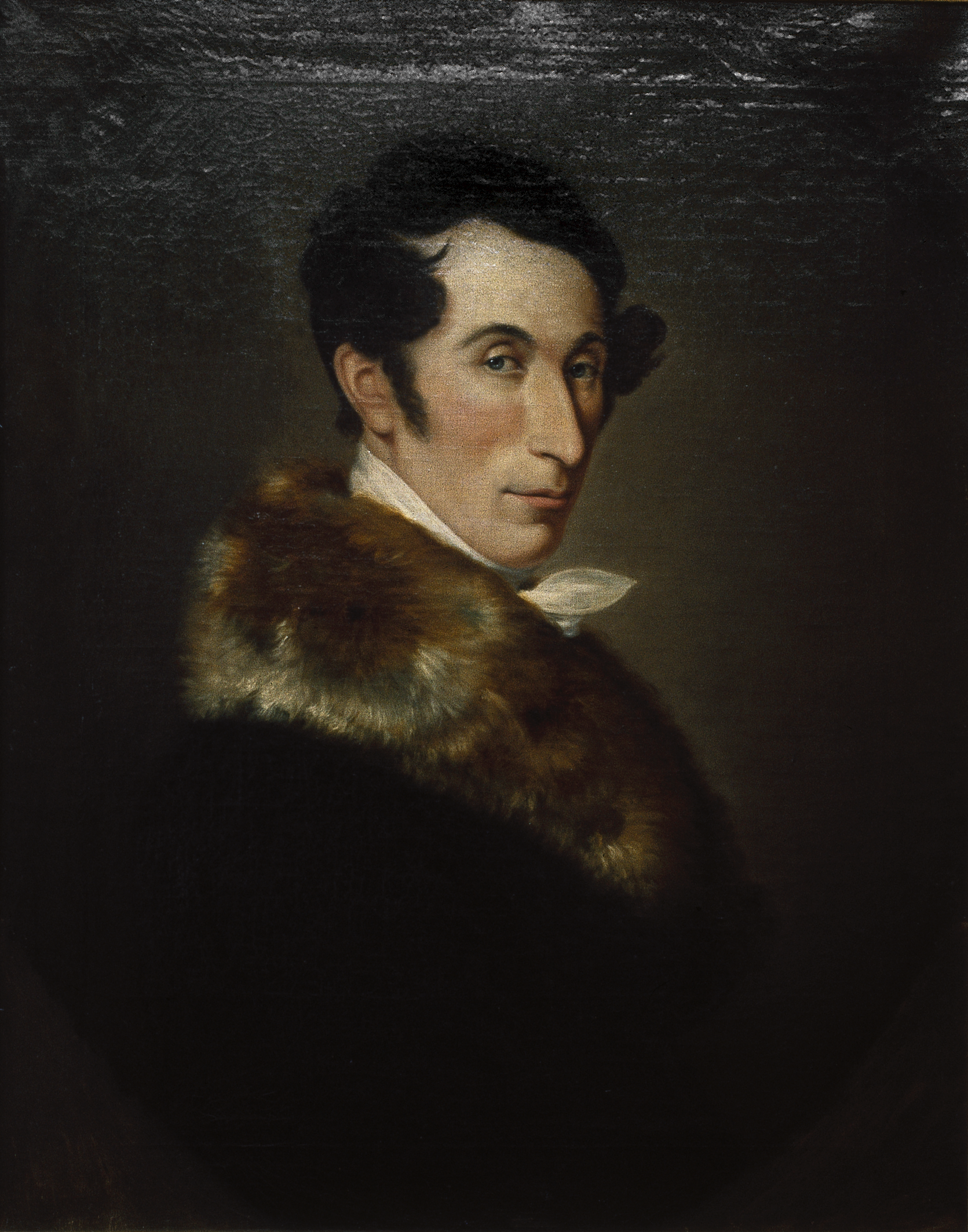
Carl Maria von Weber (1825) Portrait by Ferdinand Schimon, Dresden, Städtische Galerie

The successful premiere of Der Freischütz on 18 June 1821 in Berlin led to performances all over Europe. On the very morning of the premiere, Weber finished his Konzertstück in F minor for Piano and Orchestra, and he premiered it a week later.

In 1823, Weber composed his first (and only) full-length, through-composed opera Euryanthe to a libretto by Helmina von Chézy, several passages of which (notably the music for the villainous couple Lysiart and Eglantine) anticipate the early, romantic operas of Richard Wagner. In 1824, Weber received an invitation from The Royal Opera, London, to compose and produce Oberon, based on Christoph Martin Wieland's poem of the same name. Weber accepted the invitation, and in 1826 he travelled to England, to finish the work and conduct the premiere on 12 April.

Weber was already suffering from tuberculosis when he visited London. He conducted the premiere and twelve sold-out performances of Oberon in London during April and in May, and despite his rapidly worsening health, he continued to fulfil commitments for private concerts and benefits.

He died in his sleep during the night on 5 June 1826 at the home of his good friend and host Sir George Smart; he was 39 years old. He was buried in London in the vaults beneath St Mary Moorfields, on 21 June 1826. Amongst the chief mourners were many notable musicians and theatre actors of the day including: Anton Furstenau who had accompanied Weber to London, Ignaz Moscheles, Christian Kramer, Charles Kemble, John Duruset, Johann Stumpff and James Planché.

Eighteen years later, in December 1844, his remains were transferred to the family burial plot in the Old Catholic Cemetery in Dresden at the side of his youngest son Alexander, who at the age of 19 had died of measles seven weeks before. The simple gravestone, designed by Gottfried Semper, lies against the northern boundary wall. Wagner composed a eulogy "An Weber's Grabe" WWV 72 for the reburial. The piece for male choir a cappella was premiered on 16 December 1844 in Dresden. For this occasion Wagner also composed Funeral Music for Winds after Themes from "Euryanthe" of Weber, WWV 73.

Weber's unfinished comic opera Die drei Pintos (The Three Pintos) was originally given by his widow to Meyerbeer for completion; it was eventually completed by Gustav Mahler, who conducted the first performance in Leipzig on 20 January 1888.

== Legacy ==
Weber's operas Der Freischütz, Euryanthe, and Oberon greatly influenced the development of the Romantische Oper (Romantic opera) in Germany. Der Freischütz came to be regarded as the first German opera, Euryanthe developed the leitmotif technique to an unprecedented degree, while Oberon may have influenced Mendelssohn's music for A Midsummer Night's Dream and, at the same time, revealed Weber's lifelong interest in the music of non-Western cultures. This interest was first manifested in Weber's incidental music for Schiller's translation of Gozzi's Turandot, for which he used a Chinese melody, making him the first Western composer to use an Asian tune that was not of the pseudo-Turkish kind popularized by Mozart and others.

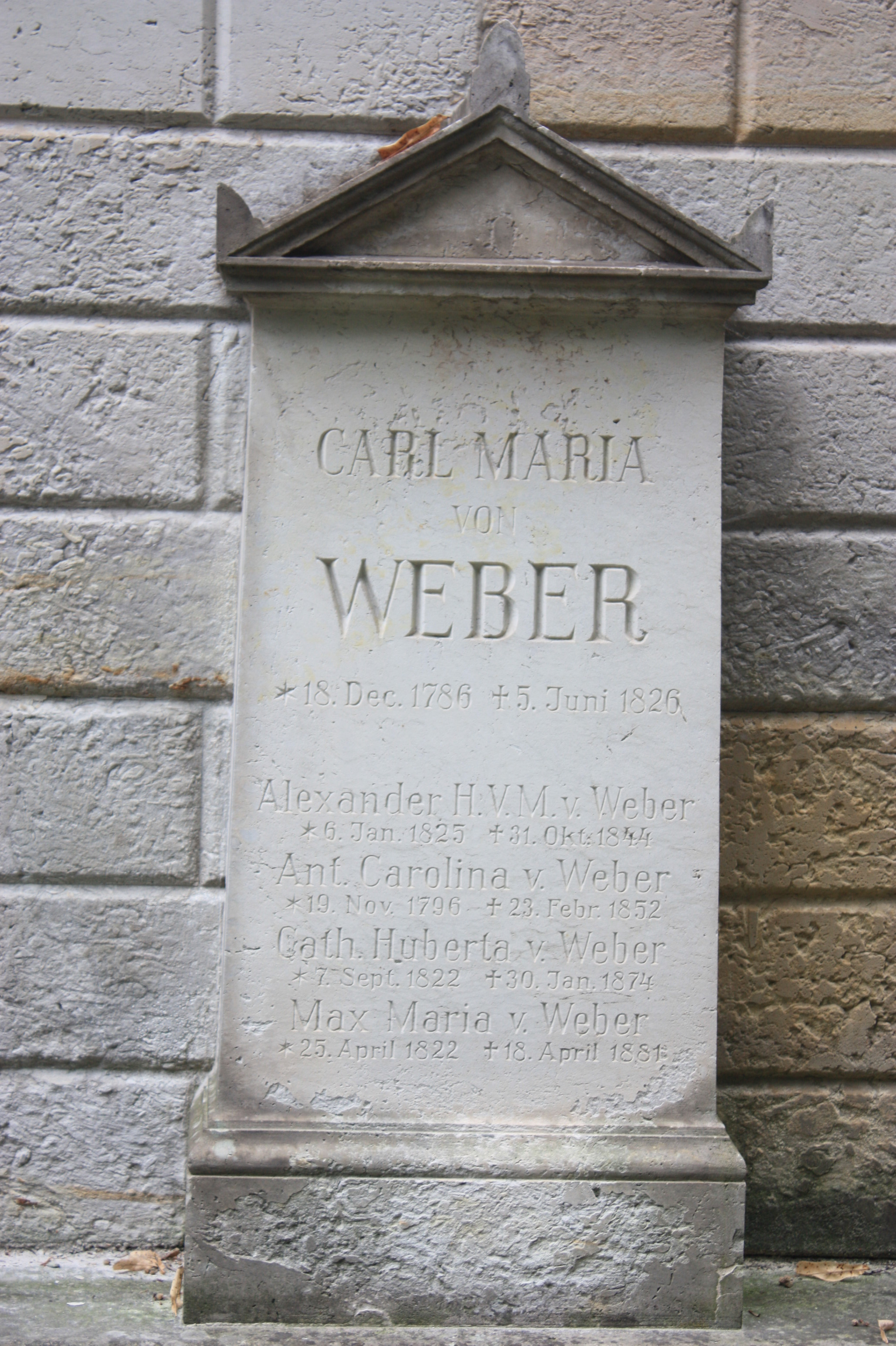
Weber's grave in the Old Catholic Cemetery in Dresden

Weber's compositions for clarinet, bassoon, and horn occupy an important place in the musical repertoire. His compositions for the clarinet, which include two concertos, a concertino, a quintet, a duo concertante, and variations on a theme from his opera Silvana, are regularly performed today. His Concertino for Horn and Orchestra requires the performer to simultaneously produce two notes by humming while playing—a technique known as "multiphonics". His bassoon concerto and the Andante e Rondo ungarese (a reworking of a piece originally for viola and orchestra) are also popular with bassoonists.

Weber's contribution to vocal and choral music is also significant. His body of Catholic religious music was highly popular in 19th-century Germany, and he composed one of the earliest song cycles, Die Temperamente beim Verluste der Geliebten ([Four] Temperaments on the Loss of a Lover). Weber was also notable as one of the first conductors to conduct without a piano or violin.

Weber's orchestration has also been highly praised and emulated by later generations of composers—Berlioz referred to him several times in his Treatise on Instrumentation while Debussy remarked that the sound of the Weber orchestra was obtained through the scrutiny of the soul of each instrument.

His operas influenced the work of later opera composers, especially in Germany, such as Marschner, Meyerbeer, and Wagner, as well as several nationalist 19th-century composers such as Glinka. Homage has been paid to Weber by many 20th-century composers, such as Debussy and Stravinsky. Mahler completed Weber's unfinished comic opera Die drei Pintos and made revisions of Euryanthe and Oberon while Hindemith composed the popular Symphonic Metamorphosis of Themes by Carl Maria von Weber, based on Weber's lesser-known keyboard works and the incidental music to Turandot.

Weber also wrote music journalism and was interested in folksong, and learned lithography to engrave his own works.

External audio
- You may hear Weber's opera Oberon Here on Archive.org
- You may hear Weber's "Invitation to the Dance" as orchestrated by Hector Berlioz and performed in 1963; Here on Archive.org

A virtuoso pianist himself, (Note: Sources that note Weber's virtuosity as a pianist include: Brown 2002a: "Johann Peter Heuschkel... laid the foundations of Weber's pianistic virtuosity" Morgan 2017, p. xiii: "he was also many other things, including... virtuoso pianist" Warrack 1976, p. 123: "a touring virtuoso...") Weber composed four sonatas, two concertos, and the Konzertstück in F minor (Concert Piece), which inspired composers such as Chopin, Liszt, and Mendelssohn. The Konzertstück provided a new model for the one-movement concerto in several contrasting sections (such as Liszt's, who often played the work), and was acknowledged by Stravinsky as the model for his Capriccio for Piano and Orchestra. Weber's shorter piano pieces, such as the Invitation to the Dance, were later orchestrated by Berlioz, while his Polacca Brillante was later set for piano and orchestra by Liszt. However, Weber's piano music all but disappeared from the repertoire. There are several recordings of the major works for the solo piano, including complete recordings of the piano sonatas and the shorter piano pieces, and there are recordings of the individual sonatas by Claudio Arrau (1st sonata), Alfred Cortot and Emil Gilels (2nd sonata), Sviatoslav Richter (3rd sonata), and Leon Fleisher (4th sonata). The Invitation to the Dance, although better known in Berlioz's orchestration (as part of the ballet music for a Paris production of Der Freischütz), has long been played and recorded by pianists (e.g., by Benno Moiseiwitsch [in Carl Tausig's arrangement]). Invitation to the Dance also served as the thematic basis for Benny Goodman's swing theme song for the radio program Let's Dance.

== Works ==
Der Freischütz – Overture
Skidmore College Orchestra

Grand Duo Concertant for clarinet and piano
1. Allegro con fuoco

2. Andante con moto

3. Allegro
Performed by William McColl (clarinet) and Joseph Levine (piano)

== Sources ==
=== Books ===
- Morgan, Joseph E. (2017). Experiencing Carl Maria Von Weber: A Listener's Companion. Lanham, Maryland: Rowman & Littlefield Publishers. ISBN 978-1-4422-5557-9.
- von Weber, Max Maria (1864). Carl Maria von Weber – Ein Lebensbild (in German). Leipzig: Ernst Keil.
- von Weber, Max Maria (1865). Carl Maria von Weber: The Life of an Artist. Translated by Simpson, John. London: Chapman & Hall. Two volumes.
- Warrack, John (1976). Carl Maria Von Weber. Cambridge, England: Cambridge University Press. ISBN 978-0-521-29121-7.

=== Articles ===
- Brown, Clive (2002a) [1992]. "Weber, Carl Maria (Friedrich Ernst) von". Grove Music Online. Oxford, England: Oxford University Press. doi:10.1093/gmo/9781561592630.article.O004022. ISBN 978-1-56159-263-0. (subscription, Wikipedia Library access or UK public library membership required)
- Brown, Clive (2002f) [1992]. "Freischütz, Der". Grove Music Online. Oxford, England: Oxford University Press. doi:10.1093/gmo/9781561592630.article.O007222. ISBN 978-1-56159-263-0. (subscription, Wikipedia Library access or UK public library membership required)

=== Web ===
- "Carl Maria von Weber – Biographie". Carl-Maria-von-Weber-Gesamtausgabe (in German). Mainz, Germany: Schott Music.
