= Op. 107 =

In music, Op. 107 stands for Opus number 107. Compositions that are assigned this number include:

- Beethoven – Ten National Airs with Variations for Flute and Piano
- Chaminade – Flute Concertino
- Dvořák – The Water Goblin
- Mendelssohn – Symphony No. 5
- Schumann – 6 Gesänge
- Shostakovich – Cello Concerto No. 1
