= Giovanni Valesi =

German opera singer

Giovanni Valesi (born Johann Evangelist Wallishauser, Walleshauser or Wellesberger; pseudonym also spelled Walesi or Vallesi) (28 April 1735, Hattenhofen – 10 January 1816, Munich) was a German tenor. In 1756 he entered the service of Duke Clemens Franz at Munich and was sent to Italy for training. A court singer at Munich from 1770 to 1798, he took part in the first performances of Mozart's La finta giardiniera and Idomeneo re di Creta. Afterwards, he took up teaching. His pupils included Johann Valentin Adamberger, Carl Maria von Weber, Luigi Lablache and his five children, born from his marriage in 1775 to Leni Mindl.
