= Concertino for Clarinet (Weber) =

1811 composition by Carl Maria von Weber

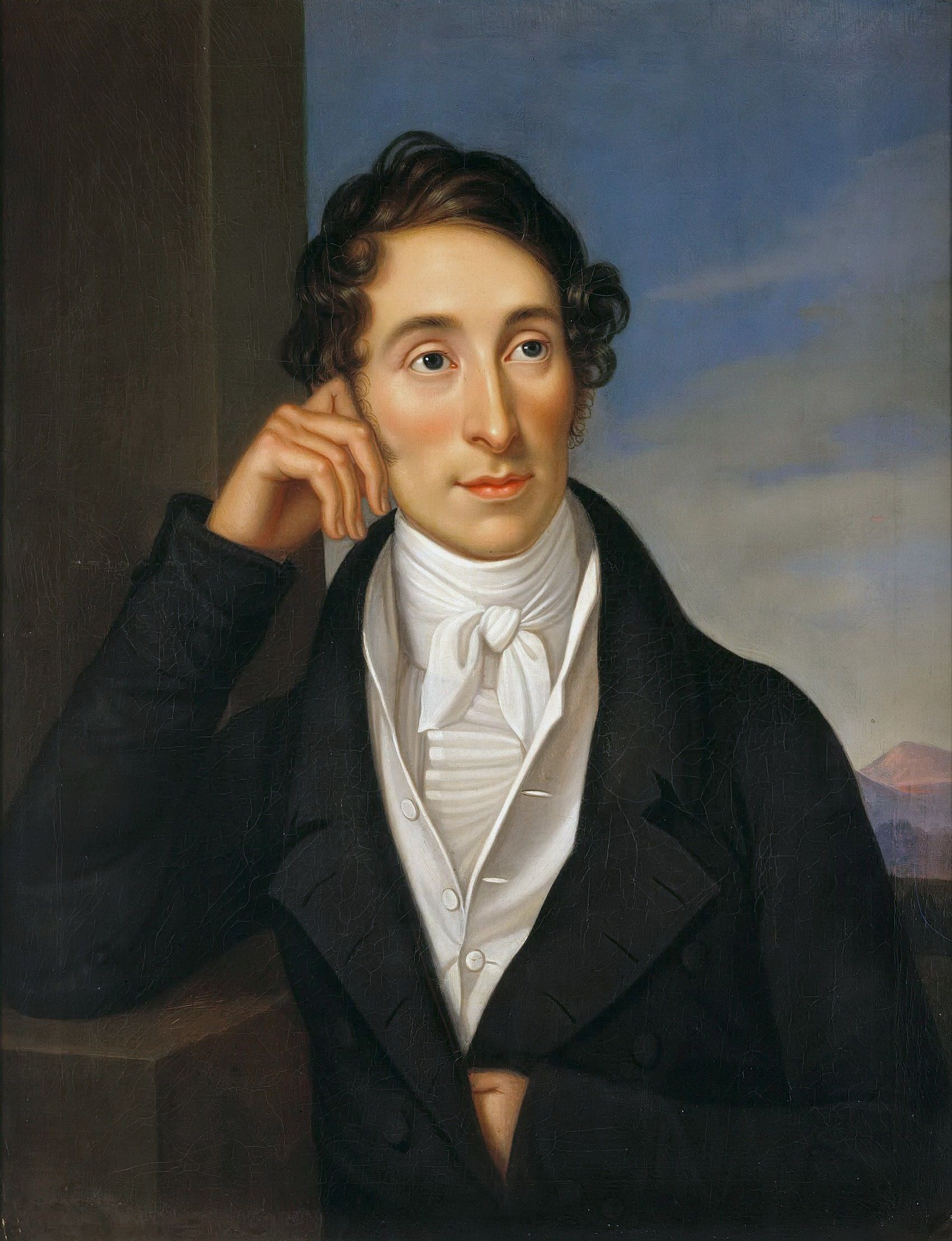
Carl Maria von Weber (1821) Painting by Caroline Bardua

Carl Maria von Weber wrote his Concertino for Clarinet in E♭ major, Op. 26, J. 109, for clarinettist Heinrich Bärmann in 1811. Weber wrote the work in three days between March 29 and April 3. Bärmann learned the work over the next three days and the command performance, for which King Maximilian I of Bavaria purchased 50 tickets, took place on the evening of April 5.

== Structure ==
The concertino unfolds in one movement. The form is theme and variations. The piece begins with a slow introduction in C minor. The E♭ major theme is sixteen bars in length. The next section is marked poco più vivo. In some editions, what follows is "Variation I", though it could be argued that the previous section is actually the first variation. In any event, the so-called Variation I presents variations of the theme in triplets. Variation II is marked poco più vivo and presents sixteenth notes. The following variation is slow and in the parallel minor. The next variation is in 6/8 time. The piece concludes with a section marked con fuoco.
