= Franz Anton von Weber =

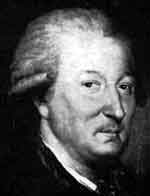
von Weber by an unknown painter.

Franz Anton von Weber (26 September 1734 - 16 April 1812) was a German musician, chapel master and theatre director, also notable for his several travels.

He was uncle to the Weber sisters: Aloysia, Constanze, Sophie and Josepha. His second marriage was to the actress and singer Genovefa Brenner, with whom he had the future composer Carl Maria von Weber.

== Life ==
He was born in Zell im Wiesental. His ancestors originated in Lörrach. Although he was not born noble, he granted himself a noble title, pretending to descend from an already-extinct south German family of the same name. He went to the Jesuit school in Freiburg im Breisgau, where he received his musical training and took supplementary courses in the violin under his father Fridolin (known as Fridolin Weber I to differentiate himself from Franz's other son Franz Fridolin) until the latter's death in 1754. Though there is no evidence to confirm it, he may have come into contact with the Mannheim school during his military service - his brother Franz Fridolin was already playing there. In 1758 Weber became an advisor to the prince bishop of Hildesheim and Steuerwald.

After gaining his licentiate in 1768, he had a large enough fortune not to need to work and stayed in Hildesheim, from which he made plans and carried out several concert tours as a violinist and an violist. In 1776 he became musical director of Johann Friedrich Stöffler's theatre company, which regularly put on plays in Hildesheim, Celle, Lüneburg, Stade, Hanover, Eutin and Lübeck.

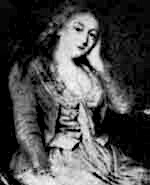
Genovefa Weber, Franz Anton's second wife and mother of Carl Maria.

In April 1779 he became chapel master to the prince-bishop of Eutin, but that orchestra was dissolved in 1781 due to budgetary issues. In 1785 he was made a city musician but was authorised to retain his title as court musical director. He also worked for travelling theatre companies and stayed in Hamburg and Vienna several times.

In summer 1783 he visited his sons Fridolin and Edmund, who were then taking lessons from Joseph Haydn in Vienna. There he met 19-year-old Genovefa Brenne, who was enjoying a certain success as a singer in Vienna. They married at the city's Schottenkirche - the witnesses were actor Joseph Lange and the composer Vincenzo Righini. Weber's first marriage had produced eight children, of whom four were still alive at the time of his second marriage, including Fridolin II and Edmund). With his second wife he had three more children, of which the last two died in infancy.

The couple left for Eutin with the two sons from Franz Anton's first marriage. His first child with Genovefa, Carl Maria, was born in 1786. The family was in Hamburg again from 1787 to 1789, at the end of which Franz Anton not only became chapel master to Johann Friedrich Toscani and Peter Carl Santorini's dramatic company in Cassel, Marburg and Hofgeismar, but also founded his own theatre troupe, which took him to places such as Meiningen, Nuremberg and Amberg.

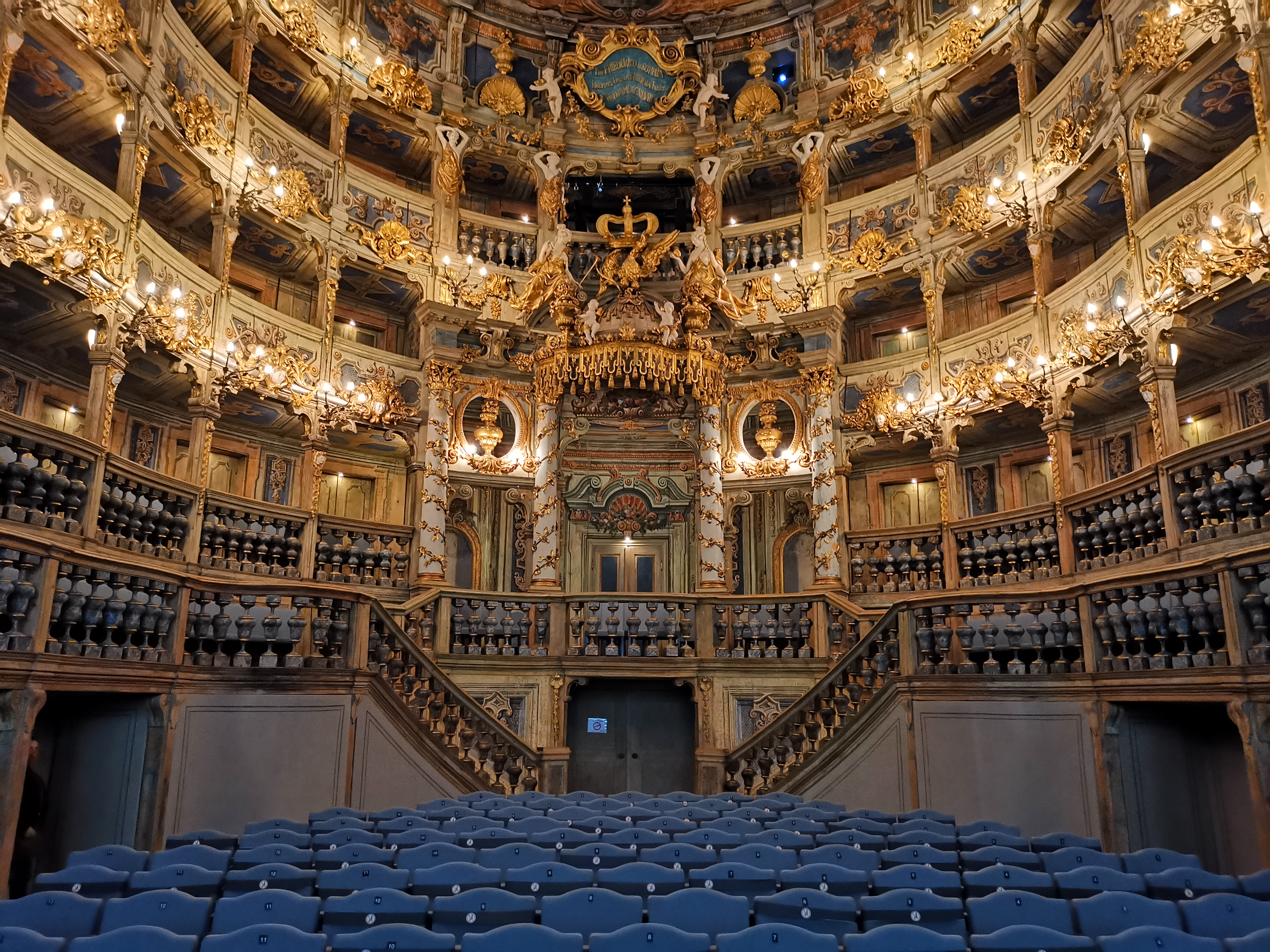
Interior of the Margravial Opera House in Bayreuth, where von Weber's troupe put on plays.

In March 1793 he arrived in Bayreuth with his musical and theatrical ensemble, where they put on shows at the Margravial Opera House and the Reithaus Theatre. Genovefa and Carl Maria, the latter aged five, accompanied him to Bayreuth. The seasons were in March–June 1793 and October 1793-spring 1794, interrupted by a summer season at Erlangen in June–September 1793. The troupe produced equal numbers of comedies, dramas and operas. Carl Maria played prince John in Albrecht III Achilles, Margrave of Brandenburg. In spring 1794 the troupe put on Mozart's The Magic Flute (Mozart's wife Constanze was Franz Anton's niece). Karl August von Hardenberg, governor general of Ansbach-Bayreuth (then in the Kingdom of Prussia) and a cousin of Novalis, pronounced in favour of making the ensemble a permanent fixture but in May 1794 Franz Anton surrendered his role to the director Daniel Gottlieb Quandt.

Franz Anton visited Weimar and Rudolstadt in 1794, where his wife put on shows in Johann Wolfgang von Goethe's theatres. In 1794-95 Franz Anton was chapel master to Franz Xaver Glöggl's dramatic company and tried again to found a theatre troupe of his own in 1795–1796. After some time in Hildburghausen the family returned to Salzburg, with Genovefa dying there in 1798, the same year as Carl Maria began studying under Michael Haydn.

Franz Anton made other artistic trips, such as to Munich (1798–1800), Freiberg (1800–1801), back to Salzburg (1801–1802), northern Germany (1802), Augsburg (1802–1803), Vienna (1803–1804) and finally Breslau (1804–1806), where Carl Maria got a job as a conductor, interrupted by stays in Carlsruhe in Silesia (1806–1807). Carl Maria set up home in Stuttgart in 1807, with his father following later, though the later spent his last years in Mannheim, where he died.
