= List of compositions by Henry Litolff =

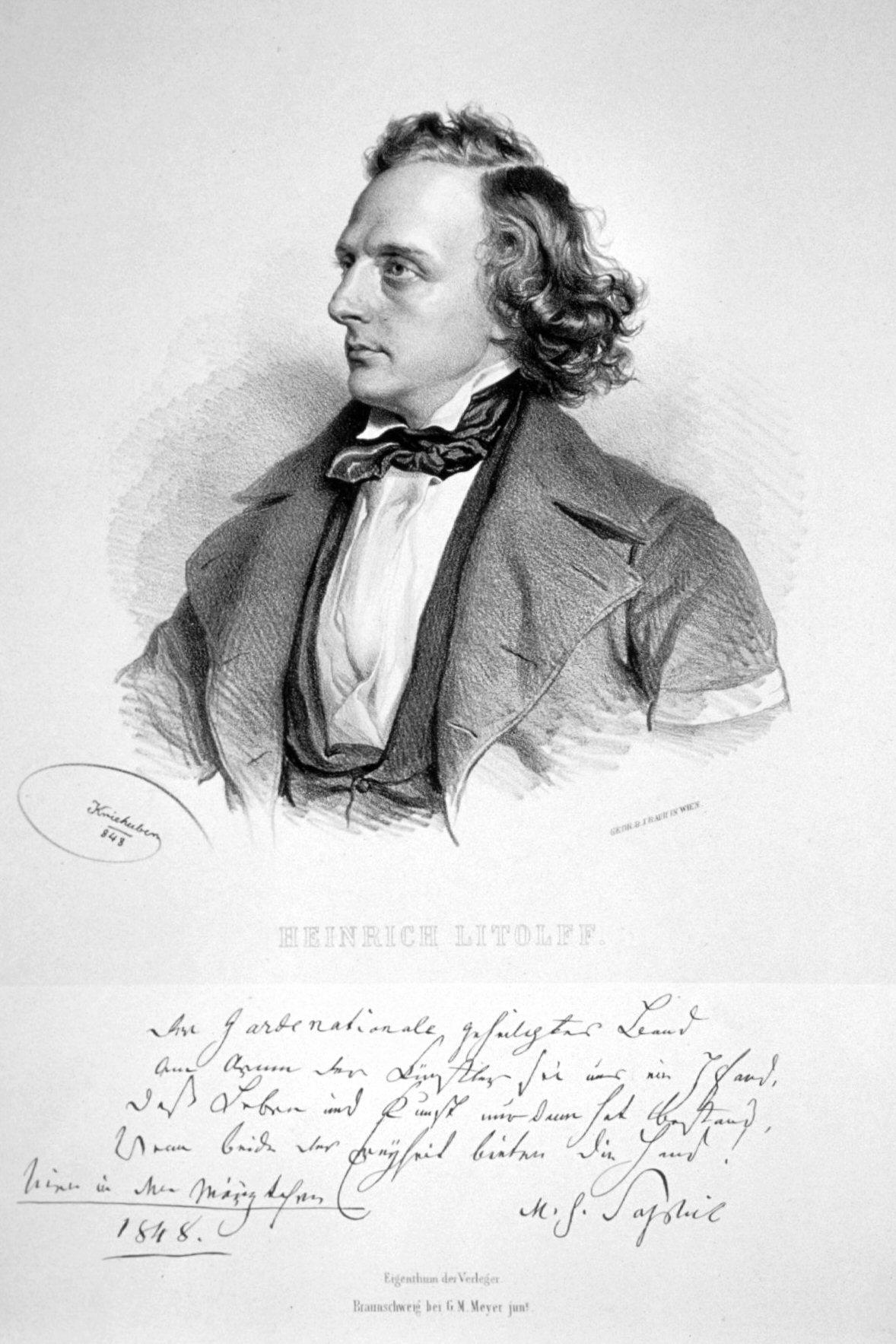
Heinrich Litolff, lithography by Josef Kriehuber, 1843

This is a list of compositions by Henry Litolff.

== Orchestral ==
- Concerto Symphonique No.1 for piano and orchestra in D minor [lost]
- Concerto Symphonique No.2 for piano and orchestra in B minor, Op. 22 (1844)
- Rêve d’un captif, for violin and orchestra, Op. 41
- Eroica, concerto symphonique for violin and orchestra, Op. 42 (c.1846)
- Concerto Symphonique No.3 (National Hollandais) for piano and orchestra in E♭ major, Op. 45 (c.1846)
- Rêve d’amour, for violin and orchestra, Op. 53
- Le Dernier Jour de la Terreur (later retitled Maximilien Robespierre), drame symphonique No.1 (later styled Ouverture zum Trauerspiel), Op. 55 (c.1850-52)
- Serenade, for violin and orchestra, Op. 61
- Les Girondins (Die Girondisten), drame symphonique No.2 (later styled Ouverture zum Trauerspiel), Op. 80 (c.1850-52)
- Les Guelfes (later retitled Das Welfenlied von Gustav von Meyern), drame symphonique No.3 (later styled Ouverture heroique), Op. 99 (c.1850-52)
- Chant des Belges, drame symphonique No.4 (later styled Ouverture dramatique), Op. 101 (c.1850-52)
- Concerto Symphonique No.4 for piano and orchestra in D minor, Op. 102 (1851–52)
- A la mémoire de Meyerbeer, marche funèbre, Op. 116 (1864)
- Concerto Symphonique No.5 for piano and orchestra in C minor, Op. 123 (c.1867)

== Chamber music ==
- Piano Trio No.1 in D minor, Op. 47 (1850)
- Piano Trio No.2 in E♭, Op. 56 (c.1850)
- String Quartet in C, Op. 60 (1851)
- Serenade for violin and piano (or cello and piano), Op. 91 (1851)
- Piano Trio No.3 in C minor, Op. 100 (c.1854)

== Piano solo ==
- Rondo élégant, Op. 2
- Grande Marche fantastique, Op. 3
- Rèverie au Bal, grande valse, Op. 5
- Fantasia on Rossini's Othello, Op. 6
- 3 Mazurkas, Op. 17
- 2 Etudes de Concert, Op. 18
- Souvenir de Lucia de Lammermoor, Op. 19
- Grande Caprice de Concert de Lucrezia Borgia, Op. 20
- Grande Fantaisie-Caprice de Concert de Robert le Diable, Op. 21
- 6 Opuscules, Op. 25 (published 1846)
- 3 Caprices en forme de Valse, Op. 28
- Moments de Tristesse, 2 nocturnes
- Invitation à la Polka, Op. 31 (1846)
- 3 Lieder ohne worte, Op. 31 [sic]
- Die Preußische Post, Op. 35
- Invitation à la Tarantelle, Op. 36
- Grand Caprice de Concert en forme de l'Étude, Op. 37
- Souvenirs de la Pologne, 3 mazurkas, Op. 40
- Souvenirs d'Harzburg, Op. 43
- Promenade du Soir au Bord du Rhin, fantasia, Op. 44
- Feuille d'Album, Op. 50
- 3 Lieder ohne worte, Op. 51
- 3 Morceaux caractéristiques, Op. 54
- Terpsichore, étude de bravoure, Op. 57
- Souvenir d'Enfance, Op. 59
- Sérénade, Op. 61
- Nocturne, Op. 62
- Le Retour, pièce de concert, Op. 63
- Elégie, Op. 64
- 6 Arabesques, Op. 65 (published 1854)
- Valse de Bravoure, Op. 66
- 3 Idylles, Op. 70
- 3 Aquarelles, Op. 71
- La Harpe d'Eole, Op. 72
- Ballade, op.73
- Souvenir d'un beau Jour, pensée musicale, Op. 74
- Une Fleur du Bal, Op. 77 (published 1853)
- Chant d'amour, étude, Op. 78
- Tarantelle infernale, Op. 79
- Spinnlied No.1, Op. 81 (1850)
- 3 Esquisses musicales, Op. 82
- 6 Lieder ohne worte, Op. 83
- Grande Valse brillante, Op. 89
- Romance, Op. 90
- Perles harmoniques, Op. 95
- Chant du Printemps, impromptu, Op. 96
- Bacchanale, scherzo, Op. 97
- 3 Impromptus, Op. 98
- Spinnlied No.2, Op. 104 (1860)
- Maitau, Lied ohne worte, Op. 105
- Les Octaves, concert piece, Op. 106 (1860)
- Valse élégante, Op. 107 (published 1861)
- Polka caractéristique, Op. 108
- La Mazurka, impromptu, Op. 109 (1861)
- Andante, Op. 110
- La Chasse, étude de concert, Op. 111
- Le Carnaval de Paris, Op. 112
- Melodie, Op. 113
- Souvenir de Vienne, caprice, Op. 114
- Scherzo, Op. 115 (published 1862)
- A la mémoire de Meyerbeer, marche funèbre, Op. 116 (1864)
- Impressions de Voyage, Op. 117
- Neckende Geister, impromptu, Op. 124
- Dernière Aurore, Lied ohne worte, Op. 125
- Frascati-Valse, Op. 126
- Der Abendstern, valse, Op. 127

== Choral ==
- Ruth et Boaz, oratorio (1869)
- Scenen aus Goethe's Faust, for solo voices, chorus and orchestra, Op. 103 (c.1875)

== Vocal ==
- 3 Lieder (O Herz lass ab zu zagen; Wolle keiner mich fragen; Das sterbende Kind), Op. 46
- Das neue Lied, Op. 48
- 3 Lieder (Nächtliche Wanderung; Liebesahnung; Trennung von der Geliebten), Op. 49
- 3 Lieder (Mein Herz; Abendlied; Einsamkeit), Op. 52
- 3 Lieder (Widmung; Vergissmeinnicht; Meine Furcht), Op. 58
- 2 Lieder (Mein Herz allein; Des Schäfers Sonntagslied), Op. 67
- Mein Herz ist krank, Op. 76

== Opera ==
- Salvator Rosa (1845)
- Catherine Howard (1847)
- Die Braut von Kynast, grand romantic opera in 3 acts (1847)
- Le chevalier Nahal, ou La gageure du diable, opera comique in 3 acts (1866)
- La boîte de Pandore, opéra-bouffe in 3 acts (1871)
- Héloïse et Abélard, opéra-comique in 3 acts (1872)
- La belle au bois dormant, opéra féerie in 3 acts (1874)
- La fiancée du roi de Garbe, opéra-comique in 4 acts (1874)
- La mandragore, opéra-comique in 3 acts (1875–76)
- Les templiers, opera in 5 acts (1885–86)
- L'escadron volant de la reine, opéra-comique in 3 acts (1888)
- Le roi Lear, opera in 3 acts (1890) [unfinished]
