= Johann Peter Heuschkel =

German musician (1773–1853)

Johann Peter Heuschkel (4 January 1773 – 5 December 1853) was a German oboist, organist, music teacher and composer.

Heuschkel was born in Harras (Eisfeld) near Eisfeld. From 1792 he was oboist and later also organist in Hildburghausen. He is best remembered for being the teacher of Carl Maria von Weber (1796). He also taught music to the children of Duke Frederic. In 1818 he became court music teacher at Biebrich, where in later years he taught his grandson Wilhelm Dilthey. As a composer, Heuschkel wrote mostly wind music, oboe concertos, piano sonatas, and songs. He died, aged 80, in Biebrich.
