= Flute Concertino (Chaminade) =

1902 Concerto by Cécile Chaminade

- by Cécile Chaminade
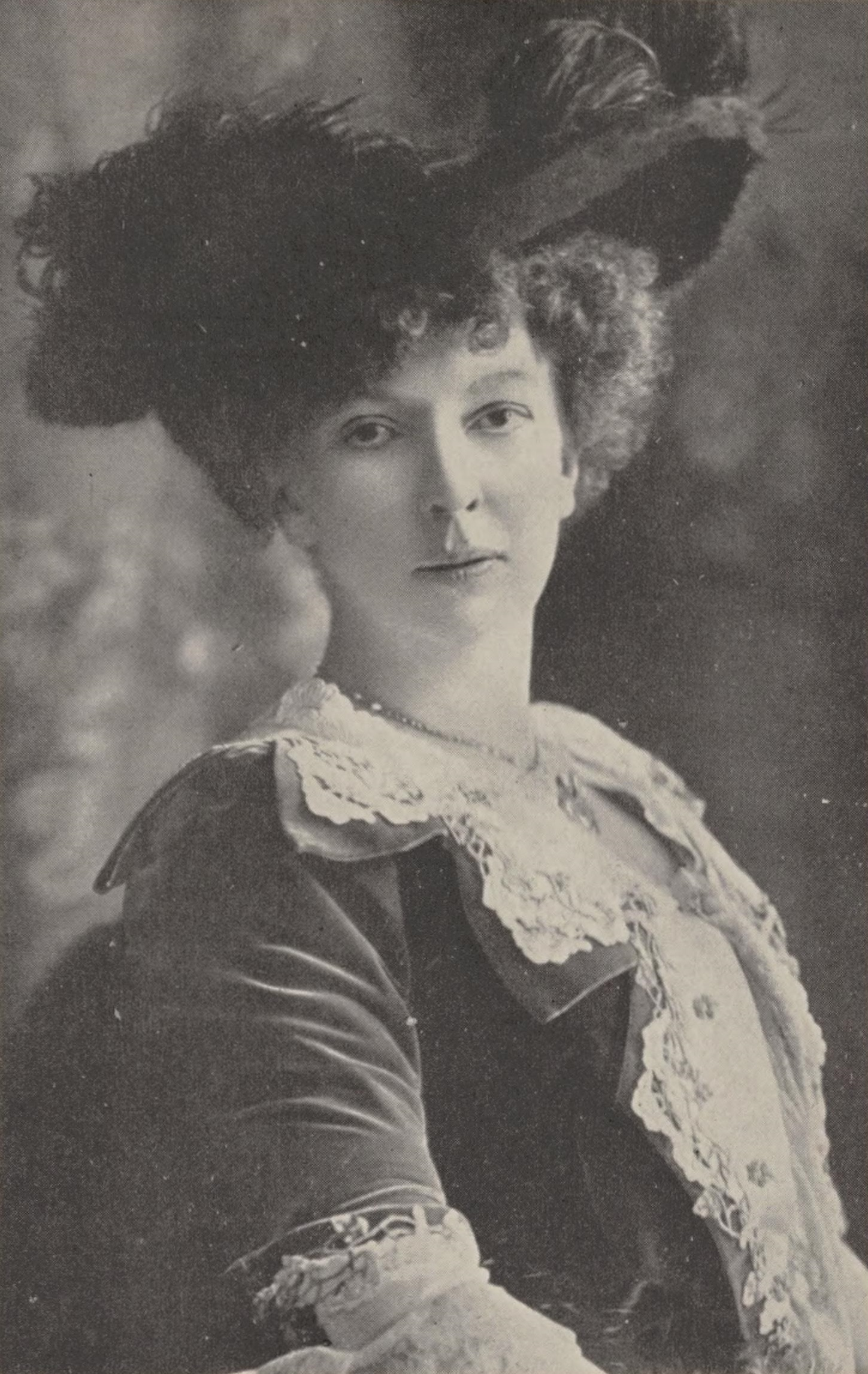
- Portrait of Cécile Chaminade
- Key: D major
- Opus: 107
- Composed: 1902
- Movements: 1
- Flute Concertino Op. 107. Performed by Alex Murray (flute) and Martha Goldstein (piano)

The Flute Concertino in D major, Op. 107, is a concertino composed in 1902 by French composer Cécile Chaminade. It was originally written for flute and piano, but Chaminade later arranged it for flute and orchestra.

The piece remains a standard and popular part of the flute repertoire. For example, it was voted #85 in a 2012 survey of the best French classical music by the Australian radio station ABC Classic FM. It also remains one of Chaminade's only pieces in contemporary repertoire.

== Background ==
Scholarship indicates that the Concertino was commissioned by the Paris Conservatoire in 1902, presumably as an examination piece for flute students, where the celebrated French flautist and teacher Paul Taffanel, to whom the Concertino was dedicated, taught. Not long after composing it, Chaminade orchestrated it for a London concert played by her friend, flautist Marguerite de Forest Anderson.

== Structure ==
The concertino is scored for solo flute, with piano or orchestral accompaniment, with a flute (besides the solo instrument), a piccolo, two oboes, two clarinets, two bassoons, four horns, three trombones, tuba, timpani, harp, and strings. Lawrence Gilman wrote that "A remarkable feature of the work is its use of the orchestra's heaviest artillery in the accompaniment, for which three trombones and tubas are requisitioned (the trumpets take a holiday)."

The composition opens with a broad melody that has a highly decorative solo part and is regarded as quite demanding for the flautist. After a more active central section, marked Più animato agitato in the score, there is a short oboe phrase that leads into a cadenza for the soloist. The piece concludes with a reprise of the opening melody and an animated coda. Although some suggest it is in rondo form, it is more likely in the form ABCA, with a codetta separating sections B and C, and a coda following the final A section. Following section C and before the flute cadenza, there is a 15 measure "section" where the original melody of section A returns. The main characteristic of rondo form is the return to the A section after each new idea has been presented. In the Concertino, however, the original melody does not appear again until after section C, just before the cadenza, and then again after the cadenza, with the final return to section A at measure 112.
