= Concertino for Horn and Orchestra (Weber) =

Composition by Carl Maria von Weber

- by C. M. von Weber
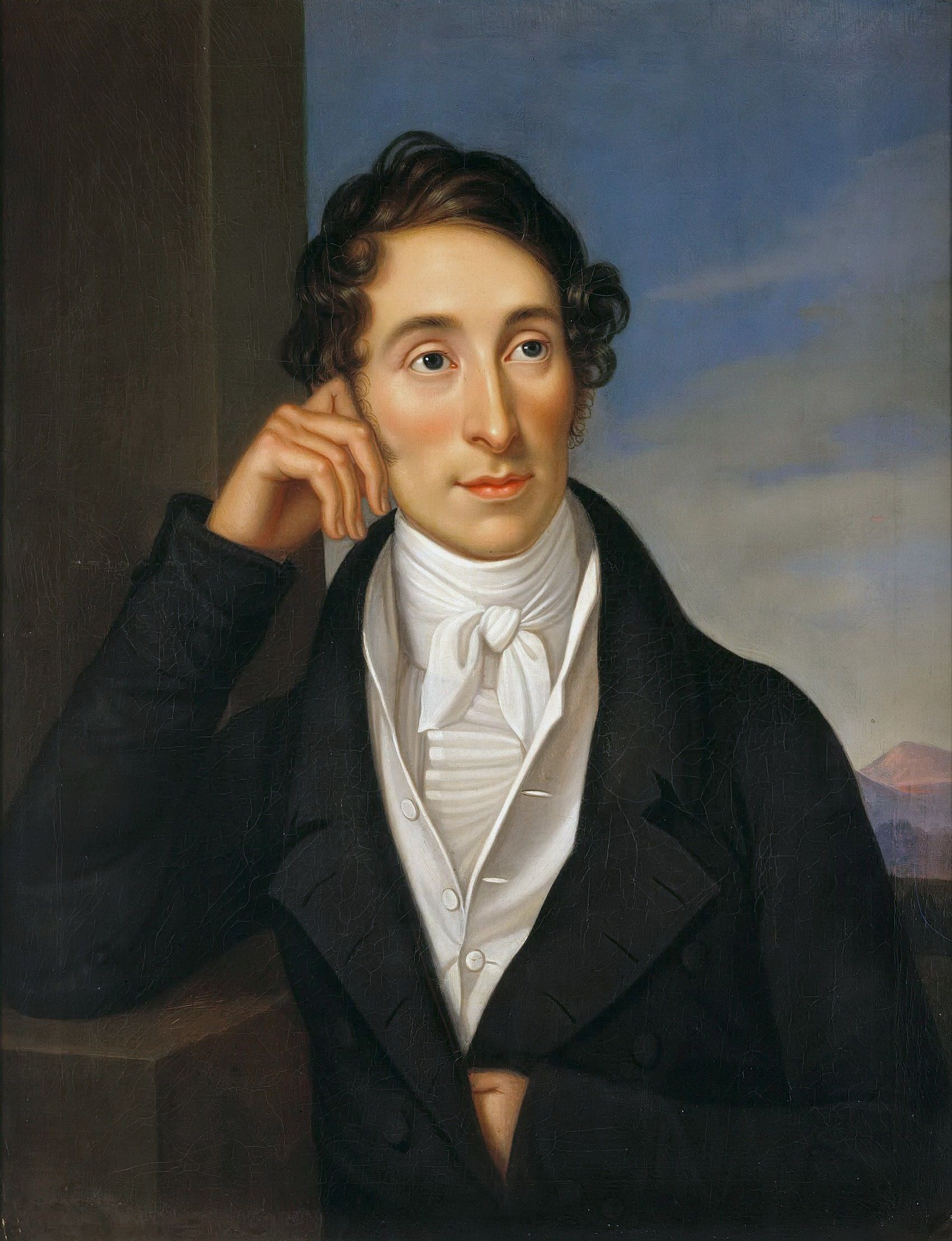
- Portrait of Weber by Caroline Bardua, 1821
- Key: E minor
- Catalogue: J. 188
- Composed: 1806
- Dedication: Dautrevaux
- Duration: c. 16 minutes
- Movements: 3
- Scoring: Solo horn and orchestra

The Concertino for Horn and Orchestra in E minor, J. 188 (Op. 45), was composed in 1806 for the Karlsruhe player Dautrevaux, and revised for the Munich virtuoso Rauch in 1815 (completed on 31 August) by Carl Maria von Weber (Warrack 1976, p. 167). It is an extremely taxing work, whether played on the natural horn for which it was written, or on the modern valve horn. The soloist is accompanied by a small orchestra. It requires, among other feats, that the player produce what is in effect a four-note chord using the interplay between humming and the sound from the instrument, a technique known as multiphonics.

The autograph manuscript of the work is preserved in the Berlin State Library.

The work is widely recorded and performed, appearing in the repertoire of well-known horn players including Hermann Baumann, Barry Tuckwell and David Pyatt.

It was originally written for the natural horn, and the authentic performance movement still sees it played on this instrument; for example, by Anthony Halstead with the Hanover Band, or by Hector McDonald with the Wiener Akadamie.

== Music ==
The Concertino is scored for a small orchestra of 1 flute, 2 clarinets, 2 bassoons, 2 horns, 2 trumpets, timpani and strings.

The form is loosely constructed and can be described as (slow) introduction, (andante) theme, variations, recitative, polonaise (Warrack 1976, p. 168).
