= Klüden =

- Ortsteil of Calvörde
- Coat of arms
- Interactive map of Klüden
- Location within Germany Location within Saxony-Anhalt
- Coordinates: 52°25′N 11°24′E
- Country: Germany
- State: Saxony-Anhalt
- District: Börde
- Municipality: Calvörde

Area
  - Total: 17.25 km^{2} (6.66 sq mi)
- Elevation: 69 m (226 ft)

Population (2006-12-31)
  - Total: 299
  - Density: 17.3/km^{2} (44.9/sq mi)
- Time zone: UTC+01:00 (CET)
  - Summer (DST): UTC+02:00 (CEST)
- Postal codes: 39638
- Dialling codes: 039056
- Vehicle registration: BK

Klüden is a village and a former municipality in the Börde district in Saxony-Anhalt, Germany.

Since 1 January 2010, it is part of the municipality Calvörde.
