= Gustav von Meyern-Hohenberg =

German jurist and playwright (1820–78)

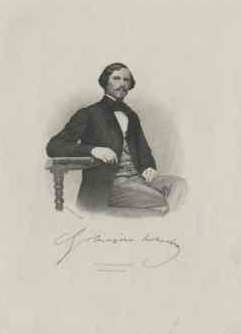
- Lithograph, 19th century
- Born: 10 September 1820; Calvörde, Brunswick
- Died: 1 March 1878 (aged 57); Konstanz, Baden, German Empire
- Occupation: Playwright
- Writing career
- Notable work: Heinrich von Schwerin (1859)

Gustav Freiherr von Meyern-Hohenberg (10 September 1820 – 1 March 1878) was a German jurist and playwright.

Baron Meyern applied himself to legal studies at the universities of Göttingen and Berlin. In 1843 he took service with Duke Ernest I of Saxe-Coburg and Gotha as appointed Geheimrat and General Intendant of the Coburg court theatre from 1860 to 1868. Meyern was unsuccessful with his dramas, which have vanished into oblivion.

== Works ==
- Ein Kaiser (1857)
- Heinrich von Schwerin, Schauspiel in 5 Akten (1859)
- Ein Kind des Elsaß, Drama in 2 Akten (1873)
- Das Ehrenwort, Schauspiel in 5 Akten (1873)
- Das Haus Posa, Schauspiel in 5 Akten (1874)
- Die Cavaliere, Schauspiel in 5 Akten (1874)
- Welfenlied (1854), melodized by Henry Litolff
