= Wegenstedt =

- Ortsteil of Calvörde
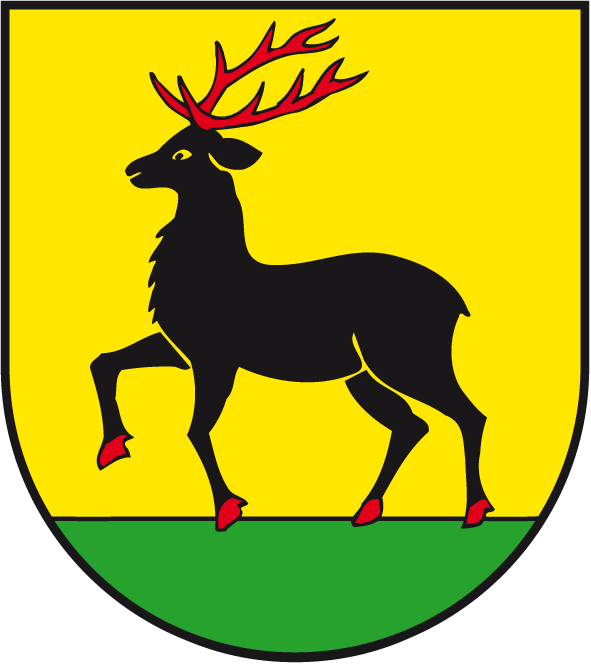
- Coat of arms
- Interactive map of Wegenstedt
- Location within Germany Location within Saxony-Anhalt
- Coordinates: 52°23′17″N 11°12′5″E
- Country: Germany
- State: Saxony-Anhalt
- District: Börde
- Municipality: Calvörde

Area
  - Total: 12.21 km^{2} (4.71 sq mi)
- Elevation: 84 m (276 ft)

Population (2006-12-31)
  - Total: 398
  - Density: 32.6/km^{2} (84.4/sq mi)
- Time zone: UTC+01:00 (CET)
  - Summer (DST): UTC+02:00 (CEST)
- Postal codes: 39359
- Dialling codes: 039059
- Vehicle registration: BK

Wegenstedt is a village and a former municipality in the Börde district in Saxony-Anhalt, Germany. Since 1 January 2010, it is part of the municipality Calvörde.
