= Calvörde =

German municipality of the Saxony-Anhalt district

- Municipality
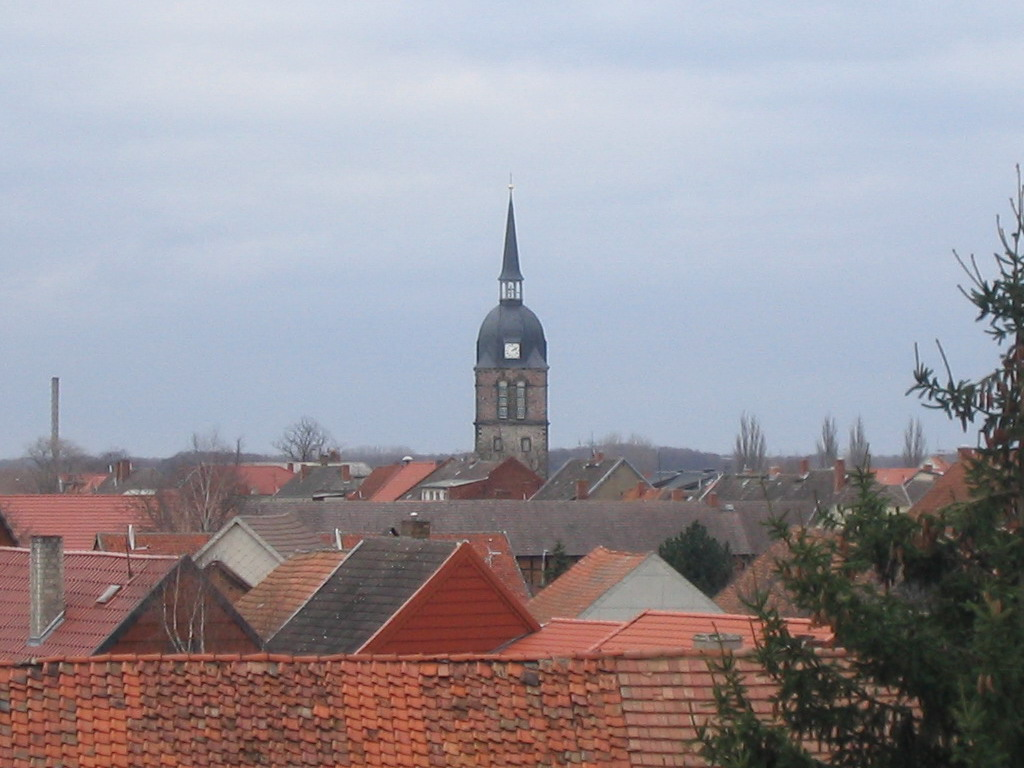
- Calvörde roofs with St George's Church

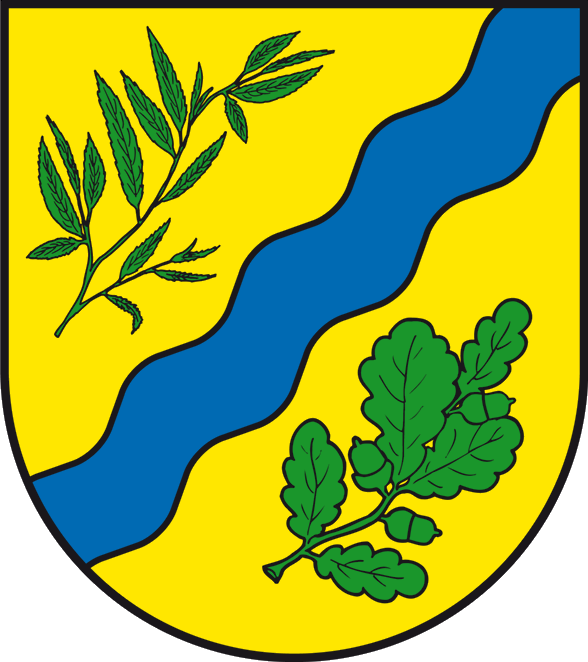
- Coat of arms

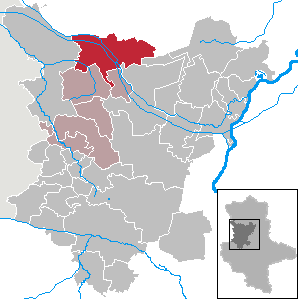
- Location of Calvörde within Börde district
- Interactive map of Calvörde
- Location within Germany Location within Saxony-Anhalt
- Coordinates: 52°23′44″N 11°17′48″E
- Country: Germany
- State: Saxony-Anhalt
- District: Börde
- Municipal assoc.: Flechtingen

Government
  - Mayor (2023–30): Hubertus Nitzschke

Area
  - Total: 122.09 km^{2} (47.14 sq mi)
- Elevation: 52 m (171 ft)

Population (2025-12-31)
  - Total: 3,141
  - Density: 25.73/km^{2} (66.63/sq mi)
- Time zone: UTC+01:00 (CET)
  - Summer (DST): UTC+02:00 (CEST)
- Postal codes: 39359, 39638
- Dialling codes: 039051, 039056, 039058, 039059
- Vehicle registration: BK
- Website: www.calvoerde.de

Calvörde (German pronunciation: [ˈkalˌføːɐ̯də]) is a municipality in the Börde district of Saxony-Anhalt, Germany. It is part of the Verbandsgemeinde ("collective municipality") Flechtingen.

== Geography ==
Calvörde is situated approximately 15 kilometres (9.3 miles) northwest of Haldensleben and 37 km (23 mi) northwest of the state capital Magdeburg. It is located between the Drömling range in the west and the Flechtingen Hills in the south. In the north, it borders on Gardelegen in the Altmarkkreis Salzwedel district. The main settlement Calvörde proper lies between the Ohre River and the parallel Midland Canal.

The municipal area comprises 11 localities (Ortsteile):

- Berenbrock
- Calvörde
- Dorst
- Elsebeck
- Grauingen
- Klüden
- Lössewitz
- Mannhausen
- Velsdorf
- Wegenstedt
- Zobbenitz

== History ==
Archaeological excavations in the area date back to the Iron Age Jastorf culture about 600-300 BC. The settlement itself was first documented in 1196, probably named after a ford crossing the Ohre river at the place where today still is a bridge. A trade route which came from Leipzig and Magdeburg in the southeast crossed the river here, leading northwestwards to Lüneburg and Hamburg, with a branch-off to Braunschweig in the west. Calvörde is possibly derived from "bleak (kahl) ford", however, according to local tradition, the emergence of the ford is attributed to a man named Kale and the historic meaning is "Kale's ford".

In the 11th century, the area was located in the eastern borderland of the Kingdom of Germany with the lands of the Polabian Slavs (Wends), who had reconquered the lands of the Northern March east of the Elbe River in the Great Slav Rising of 983. The forces of the Saxon nobles were able to repulse further Slav attacks and to control the way across the Ohre River. A fortress was erected, which from 1208 was held by the noble House of Regenstein.

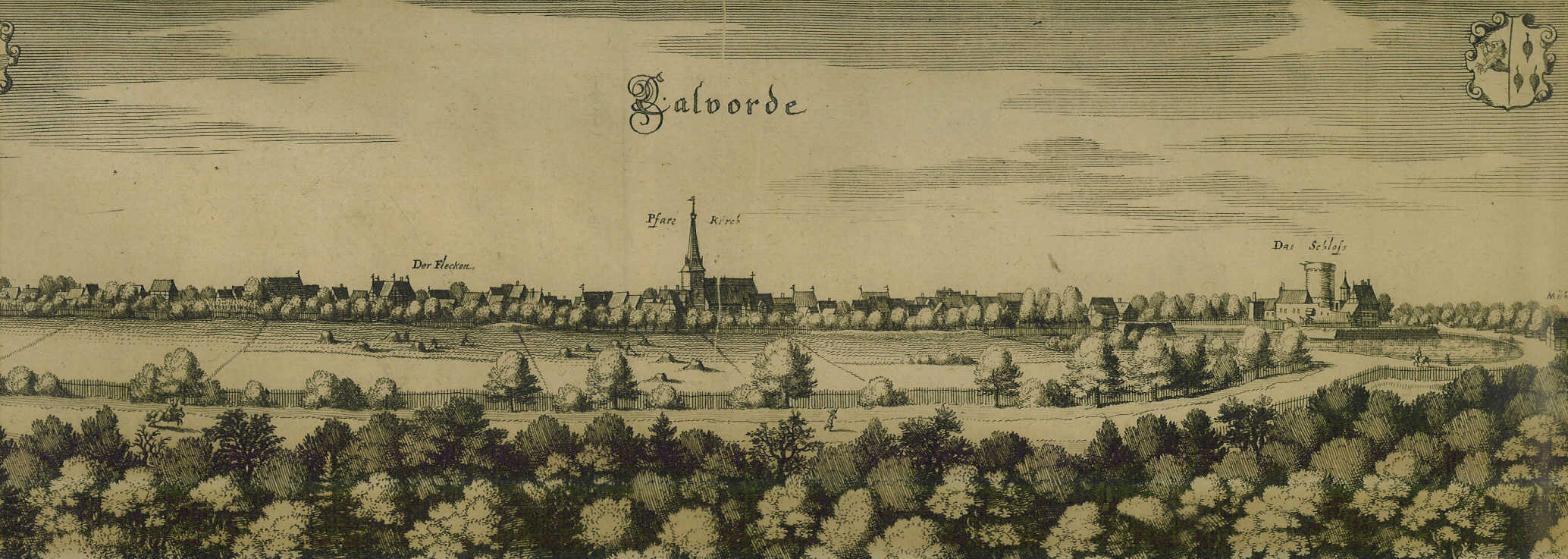
Calvorde, Matthäus Merian, c. 1654

Calvörde Castle was first mentioned in the late 13th century. From 1318 it was held by Duke Otto of Brunswick. The Welf dukes repeatedly gave Calvörde Castle in pawn to local nobles like the House of Alvensleben, while the adjacent settlement (Flecken) prospered, with town walls, a city council and seal. In 1571 Calvörde passed to the Principality of Wolfenbüttel under Duke Julius of Brunswick. With several surrounding villages and manors, it was reorganised as the Amt Calvörde, which remained an eastern exclave of the Duchy of Brunswick-Lüneburg between the Brandenburgian Altmark in the north and the Archbishopric of Magdeburg in the south.

Under the unlucky rule of Duke Frederick Ulrich of Brunswick, Calvörde was devastated by Imperial troops in the Thirty Years' War, until it passed into the allodial possessions of his wife Duchess Anna Sophia. Entirely surrounded by Brandenburg-Prussian territory from 1680, the Calvörde exclave by resolution of the 1815 Vienna Congress became part of the newly established Duchy of Brunswick, the Free State of Brunswick after the German Revolution of 1918–19. After World War II, however, according to the 1945 Potsdam Agreement, it fell with the Prussian Province of Saxony to the Soviet occupation zone and from 1949 was part of East Germany.

On 1 January 2010 Calvörde absorbed the former municipalities Berenbrock, Dorst, Grauingen, Klüden, Mannhausen, Velsdorf, Wegenstedt and Zobbenitz.

== Notable people ==
- Gustav von Meyern-Hohenberg (1820–1878), jurist and playwright
- Wilhelm von Bode (1845–1929), art historian and curator
- Friedrich Voss (1872–1953), civil engineer
