= Konzertstück in F minor (Weber) =

Concertante work for piano and orchestra

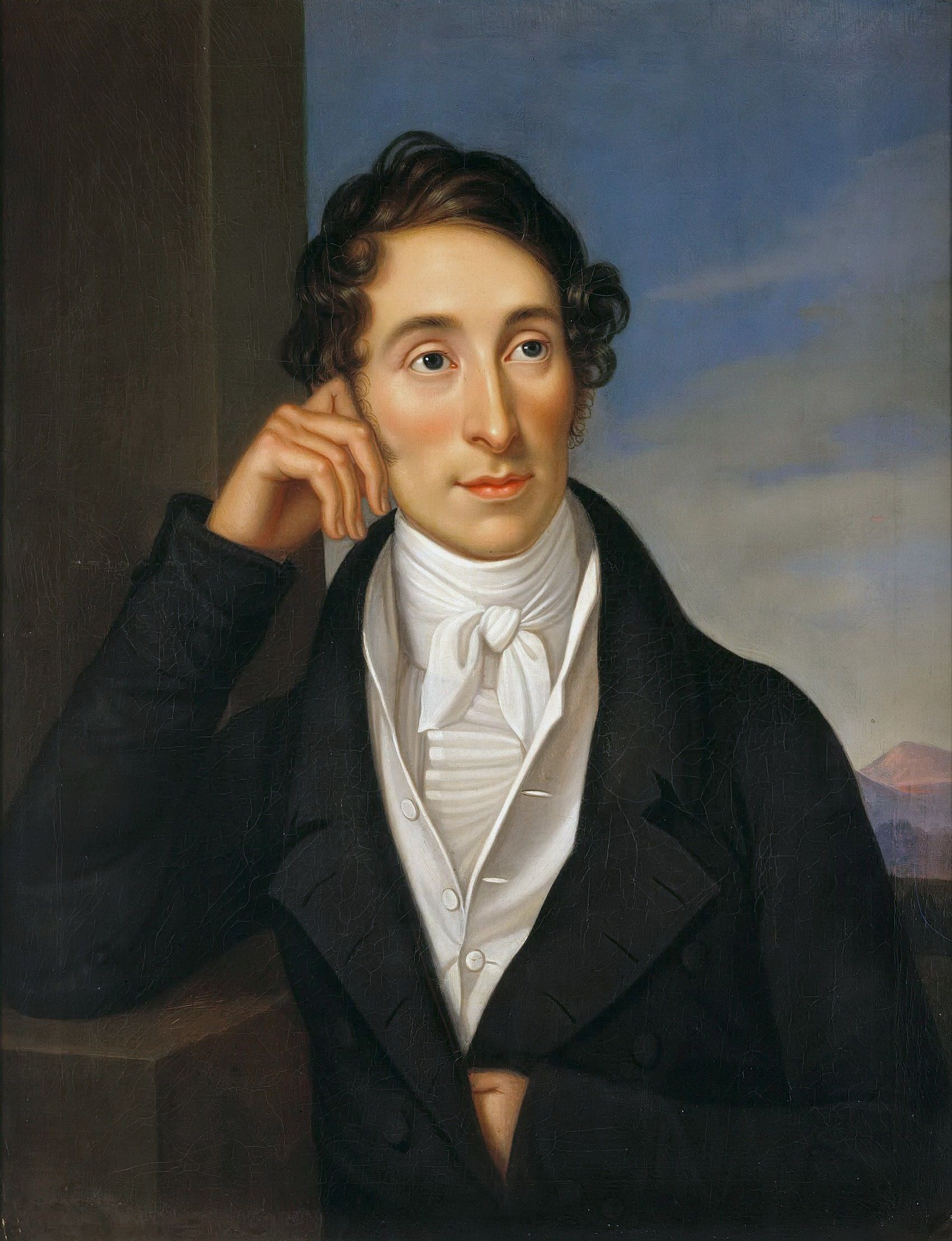
Portrait of Carl Maria von Weber by Caroline Bardua, 1821

The Konzertstück in F minor for Piano and Orchestra, Op. 79, J. 282, was written by Carl Maria von Weber. He started work on it in 1815, and completed it on the morning of the premiere of his opera Der Freischütz, 18 June 1821. He premiered it a week later, on 25 June, at his farewell Berlin concert.

== Background ==
The Konzertstück started out as a third piano concerto; however, because it is in one continuous movement (in four sections) and has an explicit program, Weber decided not to name it "concerto" but "Konzertstück" (Concert Piece). The score calls for flutes, oboes, clarinets, bassoons, horns, and trumpets in pairs, bass trombone, timpani, and strings. It takes about 17 minutes to perform and a brilliant technique is called for.

== Structure and Programme ==
On the morning of the Der Freischütz premiere, Weber played the Konzertstück through to his wife Caroline and his pupil Julius Benedict, and told them the program:

(F minor; Larghetto affetuoso): "A châtelaine sits alone on her balcony, gazing off in the distance. Her knight has gone on a Crusade to the Holy Land. Years have passed, battles have been fought; is he still alive? Will she ever see him again?"

(F minor; Allegro passionato): "Her excited imagination summons a vision of her noble husband lying wounded and forsaken on the battlefield. Could she not fly to his side and die with him? She falls back, unconscious. Then from the distance comes the sound of a trumpet. There in the forest something flashes in the sunlight as it comes nearer and nearer"

(C major: Tempo di marcia): "Knights and squires, with the Crusaders' cross and banners waving, are acclaimed by the crowd. And there her husband is among them! She sinks into his arms."

(F major, Presto gioioso): "Happiness without end! The woods and waves sing a song of love, while a thousand voices proclaim its victory".

The theme of separation and joyous return was one that Ludwig van Beethoven had explored in 1810 in his Piano Sonata No. 26 in E flat Les Adieux, Op. 81a.

The 12-year-old Felix Mendelssohn almost certainly attended the premiere and the piece became a staple of his concert repertoire. He first played it at age 18, on 20 February 1827, in his first public concert, at which his A Midsummer Night's Dream Overture was premiered.

Among the technical tricks in the piano-writing are three upward octave glissandi—one in the third movement, and two in the finale.

Franz Liszt thoroughly revised the solo piano part to take into account the more expansive possibilities of the newer pianos of Liszt's day, as well as the new limitations (e.g. octave glissandi are more uncomfortable on the pianos from Liszt's time onward). Liszt also made a solo piano transcription of the Konzertstück (S. 576a).

The Konzertstück has been recorded many times and is a favourite of the piano concerto repertoire.
