= Mannhausen =

- Ortsteil of Calvörde
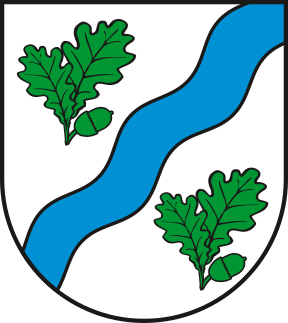
- Coat of arms
- Interactive map of Mannhausen
- Location within Germany Location within Saxony-Anhalt
- Coordinates: 52°25′0″N 11°13′26″E
- Country: Germany
- State: Saxony-Anhalt
- District: Börde
- Municipality: Calvörde

Area
  - Total: 11.01 km^{2} (4.25 sq mi)
- Elevation: 67 m (220 ft)

Population (2006-12-31)
  - Total: 285
  - Density: 25.9/km^{2} (67.0/sq mi)
- Time zone: UTC+01:00 (CET)
  - Summer (DST): UTC+02:00 (CEST)
- Postal codes: 39359
- Dialling codes: 039059
- Vehicle registration: BK

Mannhausen is a village and a former municipality in the Börde district in Saxony-Anhalt, Germany.

Since 1 January 2010, it is part of the municipality Calvörde.
