= Velsdorf =

- Ortsteil of Calvörde
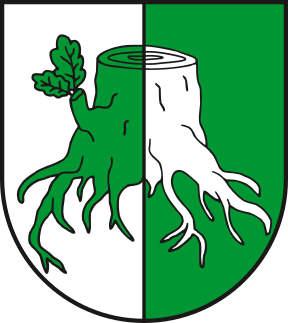
- Coat of arms
- Interactive map of Velsdorf
- Location within Germany Location within Saxony-Anhalt
- Coordinates: 52°24′27″N 11°14′50″E
- Country: Germany
- State: Saxony-Anhalt
- District: Börde
- Municipality: Calvörde

Area
  - Total: 6.78 km^{2} (2.62 sq mi)
- Elevation: 59 m (194 ft)

Population (2006-12-31)
  - Total: 197
  - Density: 29.1/km^{2} (75.3/sq mi)
- Time zone: UTC+01:00 (CET)
  - Summer (DST): UTC+02:00 (CEST)
- Postal codes: 39359
- Dialling codes: 039051, 039059
- Vehicle registration: BK

Velsdorf is a village and a former municipality in the Börde district in Saxony-Anhalt, Germany.

Since 1 January 2010, it is part of the municipality Calvörde.
