= Zobbenitz =

- Ortsteil of Calvörde
- Coat of arms
- Interactive map of Zobbenitz
- Location within Germany Location within Saxony-Anhalt
- Coordinates: 52°24′N 11°22′E
- Country: Germany
- State: Saxony-Anhalt
- District: Börde
- Municipality: Calvörde

Area
  - Total: 13.53 km^{2} (5.22 sq mi)
- Elevation: 64 m (210 ft)

Population (2006-12-31)
  - Total: 344
  - Density: 25.4/km^{2} (65.9/sq mi)
- Time zone: UTC+01:00 (CET)
  - Summer (DST): UTC+02:00 (CEST)
- Postal codes: 39638
- Dialling codes: 039056

Zobbenitz is a village and a former municipality in the district of Börde in Saxony-Anhalt, Germany. Since 1 January 2010, it has been part of the municipality Calvörde.
