= Grauingen =

- Ortsteil of Calvörde
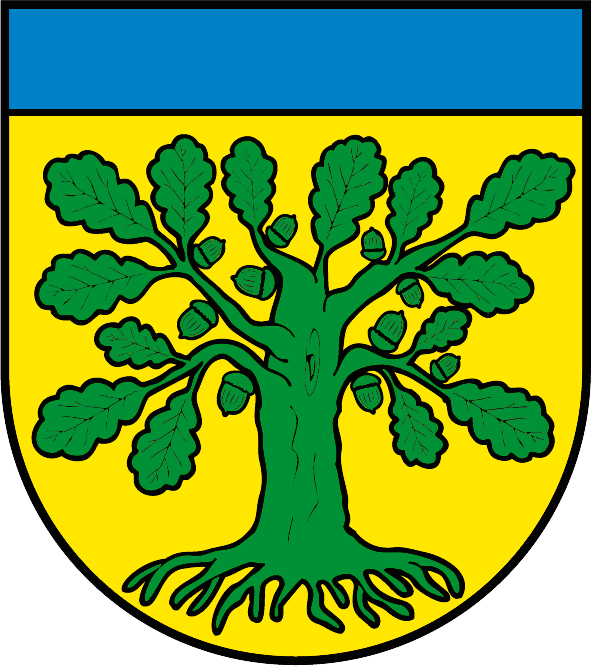
- Coat of arms
- Interactive map of Grauingen
- Location within Germany Location within Saxony-Anhalt
- Coordinates: 52°22′N 11°13′E
- Country: Germany
- State: Saxony-Anhalt
- District: Börde
- Municipality: Calvörde

Area
  - Total: 6.94 km^{2} (2.68 sq mi)
- Elevation: 79 m (259 ft)

Population (2006-12-31)
  - Total: 157
  - Density: 22.6/km^{2} (58.6/sq mi)
- Time zone: UTC+01:00 (CET)
  - Summer (DST): UTC+02:00 (CEST)
- Postal codes: 39359
- Dialling codes: 039059
- Vehicle registration: BK

Grauingen is a village and a former municipality in the Börde district in Saxony-Anhalt, Germany.

Since 1 January 2010, it is part of the municipality Calvörde.
