= Johann Andreas Stumpff =

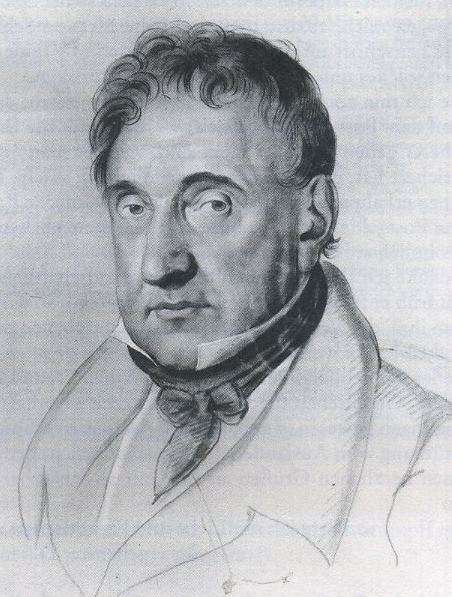
Johann Andreas Stumpff

Johann Andreas Stumpff (27 January 1769 – 2 November 1846), born in Germany, was a maker of pianos and harps in London. He met and supported Ludwig van Beethoven in the composer's later years.

== Life ==
He was born in Ruhla, Thuringia in 1769, a son of a maker of keyboard instruments. In 1789 he moved to Hamburg, and in the following year moved to London, settling there as a manufacturer of harps and pianos. He had a workshop on Great Portland Street, and styled himself "J. A. Stumpff, Harpmaker to His Majesty".

In 1814 he returned to Germany, visiting Weimar where he briefly met Johann Wolfgang von Goethe; it was probably during this visit to Germany that he bought the manuscripts of Wolfgang Amadeus Mozart's ten last string quartets, from the music publisher Johann Anton André. They remained in his possession during his lifetime.

Stumpff furthered his acquaintance with Goethe, meeting him in 1824 when he gave him presents of editions of Goethe's works, and again in 1829, when he spent every evening for a week in his company. Stumpff read aloud to Goethe his poem about a steam engine, Der Kampf der Elemente (The Battle of the Elements); Goethe published this and other poems by Stumpff in the Weimar literary periodical Chaos.

Stumpff visited Vienna in 1824, and Andreas Streicher gave him a letter of recommendation to Ludwig van Beethoven. Stumpff had a cordial meeting with him, during which it was clear that England was occupying the composer's thoughts. "Beethoven had an exaggerated opinion of London, and its highly cultured inhabitants", he wrote. Beethoven said to him, "England stands high in culture. In London everybody knows something and knows it well, but the man of Vienna can only talk of eating and drinking, and sings and pounds away at music of little significance or of his own making."

In 1826 Stumpff sent Beethoven Samuel Arnold's 40-volume edition of Handel's complete works. Beethoven thanked him in a letter of 8 February 1827, in which he also wrote that he was ill and unable to write a note of music, and was in financial difficulty. Stumpff obtained from the Royal Philharmonic Society an advance of money for Beethoven, informing the composer of this in a letter of 1 March; however the help was too late, as Beethoven died on 26 March of that year.

== Death ==
Johann Andreas Stumpff died in London in 1846.
