= Cécile Chaminade =

French composer and pianist (1857–1944)

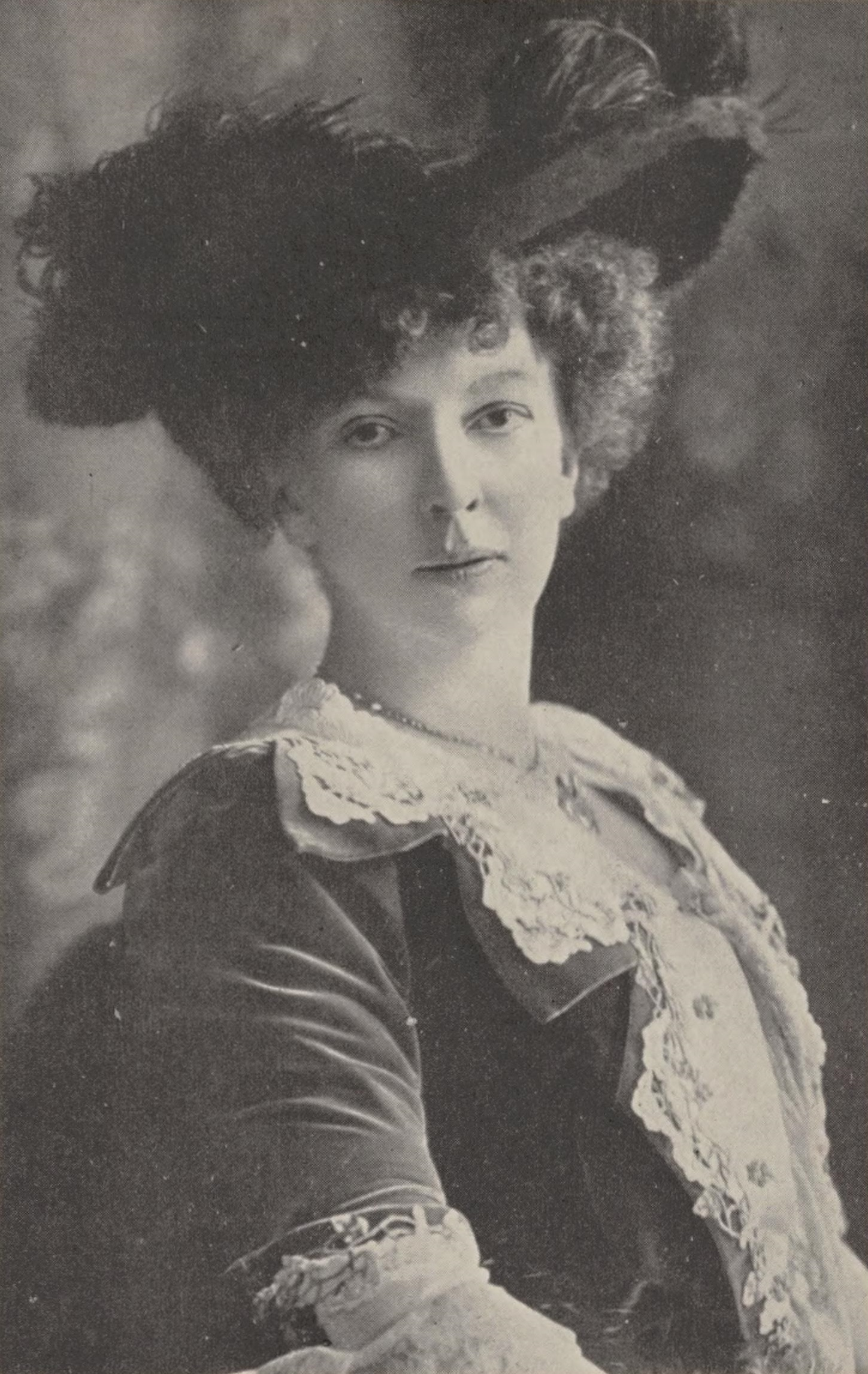
- Portrait of Cécile Chaminade
- Born: 8 August 1857; Paris, France
- Died: 13 April 1944 (aged 86); Monte Carlo, Monaco

Cécile Louise Stéphanie Chaminade (8 August 1857 – 13 April 1944) was a French composer and pianist. In 1913, she was awarded the Légion d'Honneur, a first for a female composer.

== Biography ==
Born in Batignolles (a village then outside Paris), Chaminade was raised in a musical family. She received her first piano lessons from her mother. Around age 10, Chaminade was assessed by Félix Le Couppey of the Conservatoire de Paris, who recommended that she study music at the Conservatoire. Her father forbade it because he believed it was improper for a girl of Chaminade's class. Her father did, however, allow Chaminade to study privately with teachers from the Conservatoire: piano with Le Couppey, violin with Martin Pierre Marsick, and music composition with Marie Gabriel Augustin Savard and Benjamin Godard.

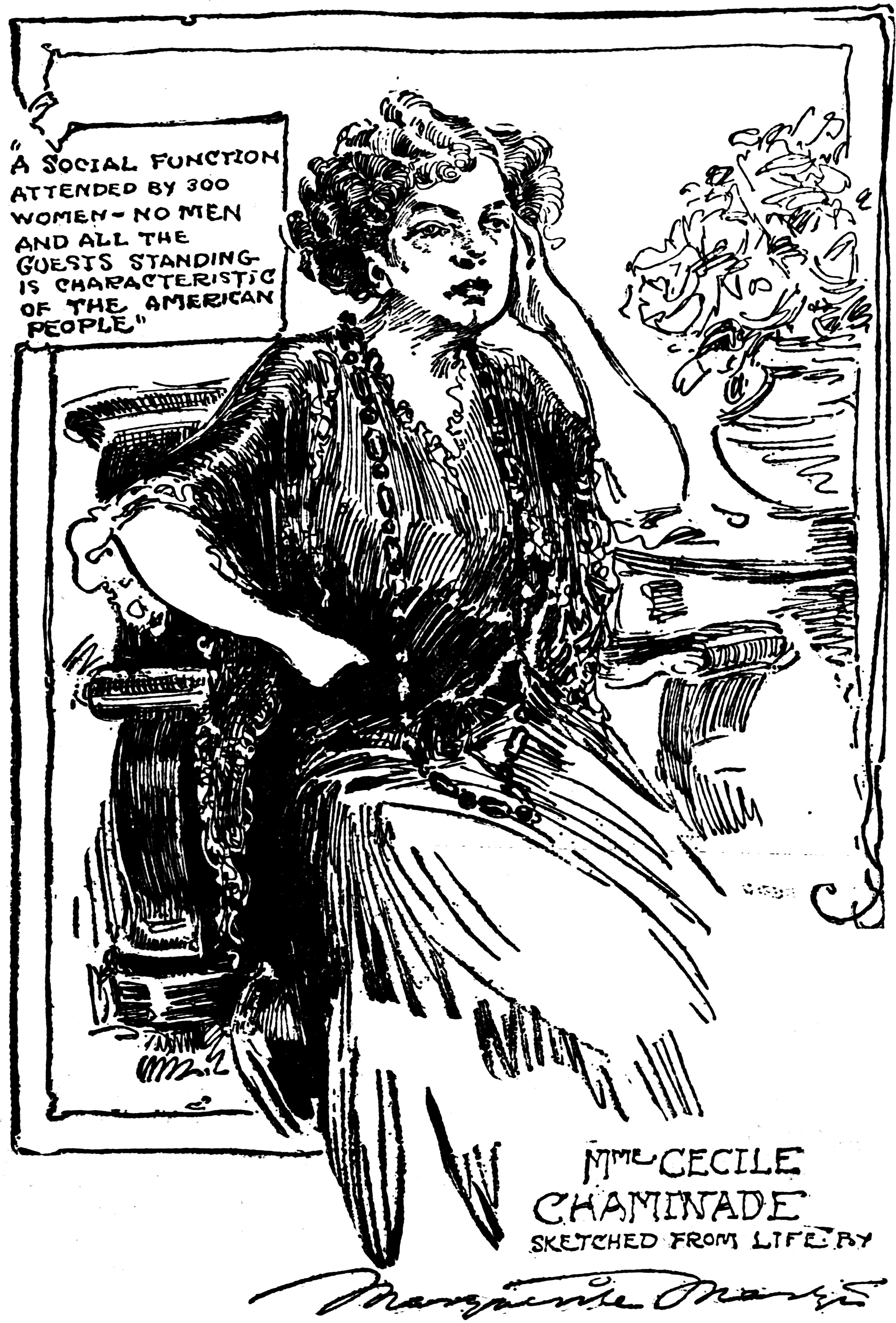
Chaminade as sketched in St. Louis by Marguerite Martyn, November 1908

Chaminade experimented in composition as a young child, composing pieces for her cats, dogs and dolls. In 1869, she performed some of her music for Georges Bizet, who was impressed with her talents. In 1878, Chaminade gave a salon performance under the auspices of her professor, Le Couppey, consisting entirely of her compositions. This performance marked the beginning of her emergence as a composer and became the archetype for the concerts she gave for the rest of her career in which she only performed her own works.

During the 1870s and 1880s several of her works were programmed by the prestigious Société nationale de musique. In her early years, she gave recitals throughout France, Switzerland, Belgium and Holland. In 1892, she debuted in England, where her work was popular. Isidor Philipp, head of the piano department at the Conservatoire de Paris, championed her works. She repeatedly returned to England in the 1890s, premiering her compositions with such singers as Blanche Marchesi and Pol Plançon. She visited England again in 1907 and performed at the Aeolian Hall in London, and in Bath. Queen Victoria was known to enjoy Chaminade's music and in 1901 at her funeral, the Prélude for Organ, Op. 78, by Chaminade was played.

Chaminade married a music publisher from Marseille, Louis-Mathieu Carbonel, in 1901. Given his advanced age, it was rumored to be a marriage of convenience and Chaminade prescribed strict marriage conditions: they were to live separately (he in Marseille and she near Paris) and their marriage was to remain platonic. Carbonel died in 1907 from a lung disease. Chaminade never remarried.

In 1908, she performed concerts in twelve cities in the United States. Her compositions were tremendous favorites with the American public, and such pieces as the "Scarf Dance" or the Ballet No. 1 were to be found in the music libraries of many lovers of piano music of the time. She composed a Konzertstück for piano and orchestra, the ballet music to Callirhoé and other orchestral works. Her songs, such as "The Silver Ring" and "Ritournelle", were also great favorites.

Chaminade was the recipient of numerous honours, both in France and abroad. In 1888 and 1892, she was honoured by the Académie Française. In 1897, she was honoured by Queen Victoria and given the Jubilee Medal. She received the Laurel Wreath from the Athens Conservatory and the Order of the Chefakat by Sultan Abdul Hamid II of the Ottoman Empire. In 1913, she was elected a Chevalier of the National Order of the Legion of Honour, a first for a female composer.

In London in November 1901, she made gramophone recordings of seven of her compositions for the Gramophone and Typewriter Company; these are among the most sought-after piano recordings by collectors, though they have been reissued on compact disk. Before and after World War I, Chaminade recorded many piano rolls, but as she grew older, she composed less and less, dying in Monte Carlo on 13 April 1944, where she was first buried. Chaminade is now buried in Passy Cemetery in Paris.

Chaminade was relegated to obscurity for the second half of the 20th century, her piano pieces and songs mostly forgotten, with the exception being the Concertino for flute and orchestra in D major, Op. 107, composed for the 1902 Conservatoire de Paris flute competition; it is her most popular piece today.

Chaminade's sister married Moritz Moszkowski, also a well-known composer and pianist like Cécile.

== Critical reception ==
Many of Chaminade's piano compositions received good reviews from critics, some of her other endeavours and more serious works were less favourably evaluated, perhaps on account of gender prejudices.

Ambroise Thomas said in 1878, "C'est n'est pas une jeune fille qui compose, c'est un compositeur" ("This is not a young girl who composes, this is a composer"). This is also quoted as "Ce n'est pas une femme compositeur, c'est un compositeur femme." ("This is not a woman who composes, but a composer who is a woman.")

Most of her compositions were published during her lifetime and were financially successful.

== Compositional style ==
Chaminade affiliated herself with nationalist composers such as Camille Saint-Saëns and Charles Gounod. Her musical style was rooted in both Romantic and French tradition throughout her career and her music has been described as tuneful, highly accessible and mildly chromatic. In describing her own style, Chaminade wrote, "I am essentially of the Romantic school, as all my work shows."

== Selected works ==
=== Opera ===
- Op. 19 La Sévillane, comic opera (1882)

=== Orchestral ===
Flute Concertino, Op. 107
Performed by Alex Murray (flute) and Martha Goldstein (piano)

- Op. 20 Suite d'Orchestre (1881)
- Op. 26 Symphonie Dramatique Les Amazones (1884)
- Op. 37 Callirhoë, ballet symphonique (1888)
- Op. 40 Konzertstück in C-sharp minor for piano and orchestra (1888)
- Op. 107 Concertino for flute and orchestra in D major (1902)

=== Choral ===
- Op. 44 Les Feux de la Saint-Jean for soloists, women's chorus and piano (1890)
- Op. 45 Sous l'Aile Blanche des Voiles for soloists, women's chorus and piano (1890)
- Op. 46 Pardon Breton for soloists, women's chorus and piano (1890)
- Op. 47 Noce Hongroise for soloists, women's chorus and piano (1890)
- Op. 48 Noël des Marins for soloists, women's chorus and piano (1890)
- Op. 49 Les Filles d'Arles for soloists, women's chorus and piano (1890)

=== Piano ===
Six Études de Concert, Op. 35, No. 2: "Automne"

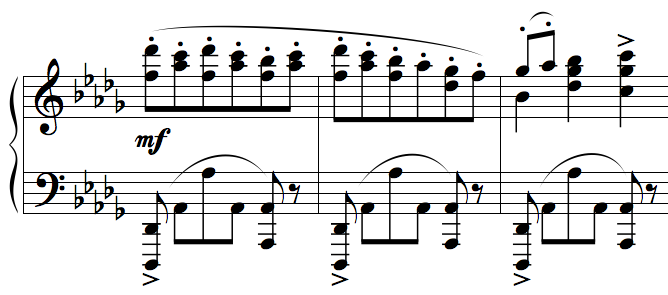
Lolita (Caprice espagnol) Op. 54

- Op. 21 Piano Sonata in C minor (1893)
- Op. 35 Six Études de Concert (1886)
- Op. 39 Toccata (1887)
- Op. 54 Lolita. Caprice espagnol (1890)
- Op. 60 Les Sylvains (1892)
- Op. 61 Arabesque (1892)
- Op. 89 Thème varié (1898)
- Op. 120 Variations sur un thème original (1906)
- Op. 117 Duo Symphonique for 2 pianos (1905)
- Op. 123 Album des enfants, première série (1906)
- Op. 126 Album des enfants, deuxième série (1907)

=== Piano duets ===
- Op. 55 Six Pièces Romantiques, Op. 55 (1890)

=== Two pianos, four hands ===
- Op. 59 Andante et Scherzettino (from Callirhoë) (1889)
- Op. 73 Valse Carnavalesque (1894)
- Op. 117 Duo Symphonique (1905)
- WU 19 Marche Hongroise (1880), unpublished

=== Solo instrument with piano ===
- Op. 18 Capriccio for violin and piano (1890)
- Op. 19 Trois Morceaux for violin and piano (1885)
- Op. 97 Rondeau for violin and piano (1899)
- Op. 107 Concertino for flute and Piano (1902)
- Op. 142 Sérénade aux étoiles for flute and piano (1911)

=== Chamber music ===
- Op. 11 Piano Trio No. 1 in G minor (1880)
- Op. 34 Piano Trio No. 2 in A minor (1886)

=== Songs ===
- "Chanson slave" (1890)
- "Les rêves" (1891)
- "Te souviens-tu?" (1878)
- "Auprès de ma mie" (1888)
- "Voisinage" (1888)
- "Nice la belle" (1889)
- "Rosemonde" (1878)
- "L'anneau d'argent" (1891)
- "Plaintes d'amour" (1891)
- "Viens, mon bien-aimé" (1892)
- "L'Amour captif" (1893)
- "Ma première lettre" (1893)
- "Malgré nous" (1893)
- "Si j'étais jardinier" (1893)
- "L'Été" (1894)
- "Mignonne" (1894)
- "Sombrero" (1894)
- "Villanelle" (1894)
- "Espoir" (1895)
- "Ronde d'amour" (1895)
- "Chanson triste" (1898)
- "Mots d'amour" (1898)
- "Alléluia" (1901)
- "Écrin" (1902)
- "Bonne humeur!" (1903)
- "Menuet" (1904)
- "La lune paresseuse" (1905)
- "Je voudrais" (1912)
- "Attente (Au pays de provence)" (1914)
