= Clarinet concerto =

Musical composition for solo clarinet

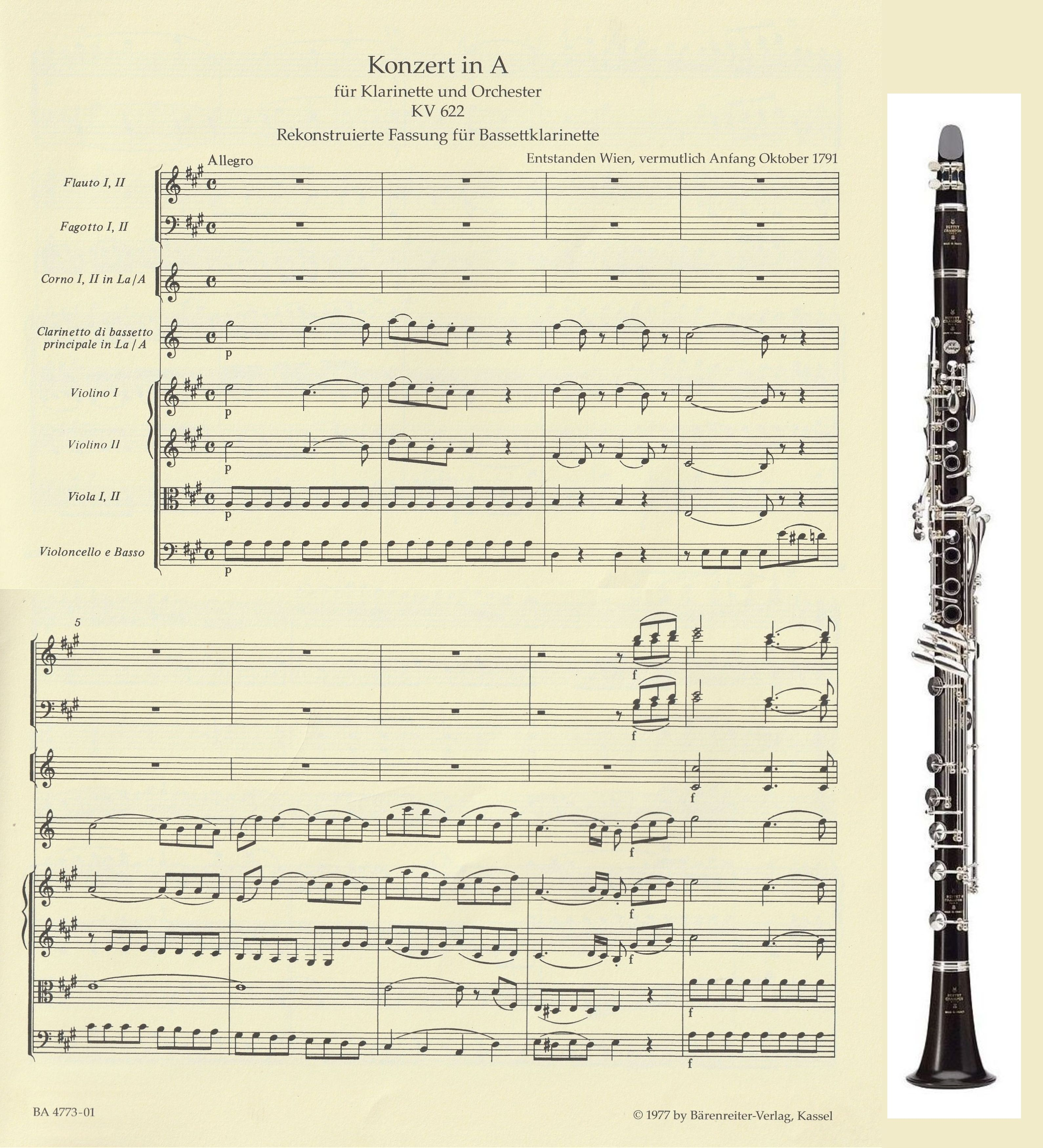
Score of Mozart's Clarinet Concerto with basset clarinet (Buffet Crampon)

A clarinet concerto is a concerto for clarinet; that is, a musical composition for solo clarinet together with a large ensemble (such as an orchestra or concert band). Albert Rice has identified a work by Giuseppe Antonio Paganelli as possibly the earliest known concerto for solo clarinet; its score appears to be titled "Concerto per il Clareto" and may date from 1733. It may, however, be intended for soprano chalumeau. There are earlier concerti grossi with concertino clarinet parts including two by Johann Valentin Rathgeber, published in 1728.

Famed publishing house Breitkopf & Härtel published the first clarinet concerto in 1772. The instrument's popularity soared and a flurry of early clarinet concertos ensued. Many of these early concertos have largely been forgotten, though German clarinettist Dieter Klocker specialized in these "lost" works. Famous clarinet concertos of the Classical and early Romantic era include those of Wolfgang Amadeus Mozart, Carl Maria von Weber and Louis Spohr.

Relatively few clarinet concertos, or wind instrument concertos generally, were produced during the middle and late Romantic music era, but the form became more popular in the twentieth century, with famous clarinet concertos from Carl Nielsen and Aaron Copland, as well as more recent ones by composers such as John Adams, Kalevi Aho, Elliott Carter, John Corigliano, Magnus Lindberg, Donald Martino, Christopher Rouse, and John Williams.

== Baroque period ==
The modern clarinet did not exist before about 1700. There are, however, a number of concertos written for its antecedent, the chalumeau.

The discovery of six clarinet concertos by Johann Melchior Molter (1696–1765) — the first of which may date from 1743 — and three concerti grossi for clarinet and oboe written by Antonio Vivaldi (1678–1741) as far back as 1711 have led music historians to revise the common view that the first concerto for the instrument was written by Johann Stamitz around 1755.

== Classical period ==
- Johann Georg Heinrich Backofen (1768–1830?)
  - Concerto in B♭ major for clarinet and orchestra, Op.3 (1809?)
  - Sinfonie Concertante in A major, Op.10 for Two Clarinets and Orchestra (1810?)
  - Clarinet Concerto in E♭ Major, Opus 16 (1809?)
  - Clarinet Concerto in E♭ Major, Opus 24 (1821?)
  - Concerto in F major for Basset-horn and Orchestra
- Joseph Beer (1744–1812)
  - Clarinet Concerto No. 1
  - Two other clarinet concertos and two double concertos
- Matthäus (Frédéric) Blasius (1758–1829)
  - Concerto No. 1 in C major for Clarinet and Orchestra
- Antonio Casimir Cartellieri (1772–1807)
  - Concerto No. 1 in B♭ major for Clarinet and Orchestra
  - Concerto No. 2 in B♭ major for Clarinet and Orchestra
  - Concerto No. 3 in E♭ major for Clarinet and Orchestra
  - Concerto for Two Clarinets & Orchestra in B♭ Major (1797)
- Bernhard Hendrik Crusell (1775–1838)
  - Concerto No. 1 in E♭ major, Op.1 (1807)
  - "Grand" Concerto No. 2 in F minor, Op.5 (1815)
  - Concerto No. 3 in B♭ major, Op.11 (c.1807–1820)
- Sébastien Demar (1763–1832)
  - Concerto in E♭ major for Clarinet and Orchestra
- François Devienne (1759–1803)
  - Concertino in B♭ major for two Clarinets and Orchestra Op.25
- Franz Anton Dimmler (1753–1827)
  - Concerto in B♭ major for Clarinet and Orchestra
- Joseph Leopold Eybler (1765–1846)
  - Concerto in B♭ major for Clarinet and Orchestra (1798)
- Josef Fiala (1748–1816)
  - Concertante in B♭ major for Clarinet and Cor Anglais
- Carl Andreas Göpfert (1768–1818)
  - Concerto in E♭ Major, Op.14
  - Concerto in B♭ Major, Op.20
  - Concerto in E♭ Major, Op.35
- Franz Anton Hoffmeister (1754–1812)
  - Clarinet Concerto in B♭ major for Clarinet and Orchestra (1782–1784?)
  - Concerto in E♭ major for two Clarinets and Orchestra (1782–1784?)
- James Hook (1746–1827)
  - Clarinet Concerto in E♭ major (1812), this is actually by Lefèvre, his Concerto No. 3 in E♭ major
- Leopold Kozeluch (1747–1818)
  - Two clarinet concertos both in E♭ major
- Franz Krommer (1759–1831)
  - Concerto in E♭ Op.36 for clarinet and orchestra (1803)
  - Concerto for two clarinets and orchestra in E♭, Op.35, (1802)
  - Concerto for two clarinets and orchestra in E♭, Op.91 (1815)
  - Konzertstück for two clarinets and orchestra
- Karol Kurpinski (1785–1857)
  - Concerto for Clarinet and Orchestra (performed 1820) (Grove: Jim Samson)
- Ludwig August Lebrun (1752–1790)
  - Concerto in one movement in B♭ major for Clarinet and Orchestra
- Jean-Xavier Lefèvre (1763–1829)
  - Clarinet Concertos No. 4 and No. 6 (1796)
- Peter Joseph von Lindpaintner (1791–1856)
  - Concertino in E♭ major for Clarinet and Orchestra
- John Mahon (c. 1748–1834)
  - Clarinet Concerto No. 2 in F major
- Wolfgang Amadeus Mozart (1756–1791)
  - Clarinet Concerto (1791)
  - Sinfonia Concertante in E♭ major for Four Winds (possibly spurious)
- Iwan Müller (1786–1854)
  - Concertante Op.23 in E♭ major for two Clarinets and Military Band
- Carlo Paessler (1774–1865)
  - Concerto con variazioni in E♭ major for Clarinet and Strings
  - Concerto in C minor for Clarinet and Orchestra
  - Concerto in B♭ major for Clarinet and Orchestra
- Ignaz Pleyel (1757–1831)
  - Concerto in C major for Clarinet in C
- František Xaver Pokorný (1729–1794)
  - Concerto in B♭ major for Clarinet and Orchestra
- Antonín Reicha (1770–1836)
  - Concerto in G minor for Clarinet and Orchestra
  - Introduction and Variations on a Theme by Dittersdorf in B♭ major for Clarinet and Orchestra
- Carl Gottlieb Reissiger (1798–1859)
  - Concertino in E♭ major Op.63 for Clarinet and Orchestra
- Alessandro Rolla (1757–1841)
  - Concerto for Bassethorn and Orchestra
- Antonio Rosetti (1750–1792)
  - Concerto No. 1 in E♭ major for Clarinet and Orchestra
  - Concerto No. 2 in E♭ major for Clarinet and Orchestra
  - Two additional clarinet concertos
- Theodor von Schacht (1748–1823)
  - Clarinet Concerto in B♭ major for clarinet and orchestra
- Georg Abraham Schneider
  - Concerto No. 1 for basset horn and orchestra, Op.90. (1820?)
  - Concerto No. 2 for basset horn and orchestra, Op.105.
- Pedro Étienne Solère (1753–1817)
  - Concerto in E♭ major for two Clarinets and Orchestra
  - Concerto in E♭ major for Clarinet and Orchestra
  - Concerto Espagnol in B♭ major for Clarinet and Orchestra
- Carl Stamitz (1745–1801)
  - 11 Clarinet Concertos
- Franz Xaver Süßmayr (1766–1803)
  - Concerto movement in D major for Basset Clarinet and Orchestra
- Franz Tausch (1762–1817)
  - Concertante Op.26 No. 2 in B♭ major for two Clarinets and Orchestra
  - Concertante Op.27 No. 1 in B♭ major for two Clarinets and Orchestra
  - Concerto in E♭ major for Clarinet and Orchestra
- Johann Vogel (1756–1788)
  - Concerto in B♭ Major
- Johann Wilhelm Wilms (1772-1847)
  - Konzert für Klarinette und Orchester B-Dur, op. 40
- Peter von Winter (1754–1825)
  - Concerto in E♭ major for Clarinet and Orchestra
- Michèl Yost (1754–1786)
  - Concerto No. 11 in B♭ major for Clarinet and Orchestra
  - Concerto No. 8 in E♭ major for Clarinet and Orchestra
  - Concerto No. 9 in B♭ major for Clarinet and Orchestra
  - Concerto No. 7 in B♭ major for Clarinet and Orchestra

Other concertos from the Classical era include those by Deshayes, Fuchs, Jan Kalous, Joseph Lacher, Lang, Philipp Meissner, Pfeilsticker, J.B. Wanhal, Wenzel Pichel, Johan Stich, and J.C. Stumpf.

== Romantic period ==
- Heinrich Joseph Bärmann (1784–1847)
  - Concertstück in G minor for Clarinet and Orchestra
  - Concertino in C minor for Clarinet and Orchestra
  - Concertino in E♭ major Op.27 for Clarinet and Orchestra (1828?)
- Carl Bärmann (1810–1885)
  - Konzertstück for two Clarinets and Orchestra
  - Concerto Militaire for Clarinet and Orchestra
- Max Bruch
  - Concerto for Clarinet, Viola, and Orchestra in E minor, Op.88 (1910)
- Gaetano Donizetti
  - Concertino for Clarinet and Orchestra in B♭ major
- Donato Lovreglio's (1847–1907)
  - Fantasia Da Concerto Su Motivi De La Traviata (Fantasia for Clarinet and Orchestra on the Opera, La Traviata) for Clarinet and Orchestra (Original music/opera by Giuseppe Verdi)
- Felix Mendelssohn (1809–1847)
  - Concert Piece No. 1 for Clarinet, Basset Horn, and Orchestra in F minor, Op.113 (1833)
  - Concert Piece No. 2 for Clarinet, Basset Horn, and Orchestra in D minor, Op.114 (1833)
- Saverio Mercadante (1795–1870)
  - Clarinet Concerto in B♭ major
  - Clarinet Concerto in E♭ major
- Julius Rietz (1812–1877)
  - Concerto in G minor Op.29 for Clarinet and Orchestra (c.1840s)
- Nikolai Rimsky-Korsakov (1844–1908)
  - Concertstück for Clarinet and Military Band (1878)
- Gioachino Rossini (1792–1868)
  - Introduction, Theme and Variations in E♭ major/B♭ major for Clarinet and Orchestra
  - Variations for Clarinet and Small Orchestra in C major (1809)
  - Concerto No. 1 in C minor/A♭ major/E♭ major for two Clarinets and Orchestra
  - Introduction, Theme and Variations in B minor/B♭ major for Clarinet and Orchestra
  - Fantasie in E♭ major for Clarinet and Orchestra
  - Concerto No. 2 in E♭ major/A♭ major/E♭ major for two Clarinets and Orchestra
- Louis Schindelmeisser (1811–1864)
  - Sinfonia Concertante for four Clarinets and Orchestra, Op.2 (1833)
- Louis Spohr (1784–1859)
  - Clarinet Concerto No. 1 C Minor, Op.26 (1808)
  - Clarinet Concerto No. 2 in E♭ Major, Op.57 (1810)
  - Clarinet Concerto No. 3 in F Minor, WoO 19 (1821)
  - Clarinet Concerto No. 4 in E Minor, WoO 20 (1828)
  - Fantasia and Variations on a Theme of Danzi, Op.81
  - Potpourri for Clarinet and Orchestra in F Major, Op.80 (1811)
  - Variations on a Theme from "Alruna" for Clarinet and Orchestra (1809)
- Charles Villiers Stanford (1852–1924)
  - Clarinet Concerto in A minor Op.80 (1902)
- Richard Strauss (1864-1949)
  - Duet concertino for clarinet and bassoon (1947)
- Sergey Ivanovich Taneyev (1856–1915)
  - Canzona for Clarinet and Strings in F minor
- Carl Maria von Weber (1786–1826)
  - Concertino for clarinet and orchestra
  - Clarinet Concerto No. 1
  - Clarinet Concerto No. 2 (all 1811)

== 20th/21st century ==
- John Adams
  - Gnarly Buttons (1996)
- Kalevi Aho
  - Clarinet Concerto (2005)
- Joan Albert Amargós
  - Clarinet Concerto
- Malcolm Arnold
  - Clarinet Concerto No. 1 (1948)
  - Clarinet Concerto No. 2 (1974)
- Jacob Avshalomov
  - Evocations, Concerto for Clarinet and Chamber Orchestra
- Sérgio Azevedo
  - Clarinet Concerto (2013)
- Nicolas Bacri
  - Concerto da Camera Op.61 (1999) for Clarinet and String Orchestra
- Jean Balissat
  - Cantabile for Clarinet and Strings (1995)
- Karol Beffa
  - Clarinet Concerto (2014)
- Michael Berkeley
  - Clarinet Concerto (1991)
- Leonard Bernstein
  - Prelude, Fugue, and Riffs (1946)
- Jean Binet
  - Petit Concert for Clarinet and Strings (1950)
- Howard Blake
  - Clarinet Concerto
- William Bolcom
  - Clarinet Concerto (1988)
- Jacques Bondon
  - Concerto d'Octobre for Clarinet and String Orchestra
  - Concerto des Offrandes for Clarinet and Orchestra
- Eugène Bozza
  - Concerto for Clarinet and Small Orchestra
- Benjamin Britten
  - Movement for Clarinet and Orchestra (1942/3)
- James Francis Brown
  - Lost Lanes, Shadow Groves (2008)
- Ferruccio Busoni
  - Concertino for Clarinet and Chamber Orchestra, Op.48 (1918)
- Ann Callaway
  - Concerto for Bass Clarinet and Chamber Orchestra (1985–1987)
- Elliott Carter
  - Clarinet Concerto (1996)
- Arnold Cooke
  - Concerto for Clarinet and Orchestra
- Aaron Copland
  - Clarinet Concerto (1948)
- John Corigliano
  - Clarinet Concerto (1977)
- Peter Maxwell Davies
  - Strathclyde Concerto No. 4 (1990)
  - The Seas of Kirk Swarf for bass clarinet and strings (2007)
- Claude Debussy
  - Première rhapsodie
- Miguel del Aguila
  - Clarinet Concerto (1990)
- Norman Dello Joio
  - Concertante for Clarinet and Orchestra
- Edison Denisov
  - Concerto for Clarinet and Orchestra (1989)
- Daniel Dorff
  - Summer Solstice for Clarinet and String Orchestra (1994)
- Einar Englund
  - Clarinet Concerto
- Dietrich Erdmann
  - Concerto for bass clarinet and orchestra.
- Richard Festinger
  - Equinox for Clarinet and Small Orchestra (2009)
- Gerald Finzi
  - Clarinet Concerto (1949)
- Jean Françaix
  - Clarinet Concerto (1968)
- Gunnar de Frumerie
  - Concerto Op.51 (1957–1958) for Clarinet, Strings, Harp and Percussion
- Jeremy Gill
  - Notturno Concertante for clarinet and large orchestra (2014)
- Radamés Gnattali
  - Choro for Clarinet in B♭ and Orchestra
- Berthold Goldschmidt
  - Clarinet Concerto
- Osvaldo Golijov
  - Dreams and Prayers of Isaac the Blind for solo clarinetist (soprano clarinets, basset horn, and bass clarinet) and string quartet, later arranged for solo clarinetist and string orchestra.
- Ida Gotkovsky
  - Concerto for clarinet and orchestra (1968) or clarinet and wind orchestra (1997)
  - Concerto lyrique for clarinet and orchestra (1982) or clarinet and wind orchestra (1994)
- Helen Grime
  - Clarinet Concerto (2009)
- Kimmo Hakola
  - Concerto for Clarinet and Orchestra (2001)
- Stephen Hartke
  - Concerto for Clarinet and Orchestra "Landscapes with Blues" (2001)
- Patrick Hawes
  - Clarinet Concerto for Emma Johnson (2015)
- Paul Hindemith
  - Clarinet Concerto (1947)
- Hendrik Hofmeyr
  - Clarinet Concerto (2012)
- Anthony Iannaccone
  - Concertante for Clarinet and Orchestra (1995)
- Gordon Jacob
  - Mini-concerto for Clarinet and String Orchestra
- Shigeru Kan-no
  - Bassetklarinette Koncerto (2006)
- Helmut Lachenmann
  - Accanto (1976)
- Lowell Liebermann
  - Concerto for Clarinet and Orchestra Op.110 (2009)
- Magnus Lindberg
  - Clarinet Concerto (2002)
- David Maslanka
  - Desert Roads: Four Songs for Clarinet and Wind Ensemble (2005)
- Scott McAllister
  - X (1996)
  - Black Dog (2003)
  - Free Birds (2009)
- Ian McDougall
  - Concerto for Clarinet & String Orchestra
- William Thomas McKinley
  - Concerto for Clarinet No. 3 The Alchemical (1994)
- James MacMillan
  - Ninian for Clarinet and Orchestra (1996)
- Elizabeth Maconchy
  - Concertino No. 1 for Clarinet and Orchestra
  - Concertino No. 2 for Clarinet and Orchestra
- Dimitris Maronidis
  - Clarinet Concerto for Cl, String Orchestra and Electronics (2020)
- Donald Martino
  - Triple Concerto for clarinet, bass clarinet, and contrabass clarinet.
- Rolf Martinsson
  - Concert Fantastique Clarinet Concerto No. 1, Op.86 (2010)
- Krzysztof Meyer
  - Concerto for Clarinet and Orchestra (2002)
- Jacob Mühlrad
  - SEMA (2024)
- Thea Musgrave
  - Clarinet Concerto (1979)
  - Concerto for bass clarinet and orchestra
- Lior Navok
  - Clarinet Concerto (1996)
- Carl Nielsen
  - Clarinet Concerto (1928)
- Jim Parker
  - Concerto for Clarinet and Strings
- Krzysztof Penderecki
  - Clarinet Concerto
- Lorenzo Perosi
  - Concerto per clarinetto e orchestra
- Walter Piston
  - Concerto for Clarinet and Orchestra (1967)
- Marcel Poot
  - Concerto for Clarinet and Orchestra (1977)
- Kevin Puts
  - Clarinet Concerto with Strings, Harp, and Percussion (2008–9)
- Einojuhani Rautavaara
  - Clarinet Concerto (2001)
- Alan Rawsthorne
  - Concerto for Clarinet and String Orchestra
- Jean Rivier
  - Concerto for Clarinet and String Orchestra
- John Robertson
  - Concerto #1 for Clarinet and String Orchestra Op. 27 (1989)
  - Concerto #2 for Clarinet and Small Orchestra Op. 83 (2022)
- Christopher Rouse
  - Clarinet Concerto (2000)
- Jonathan Russell
  - Bass Clarinet Double Concerto (2007)
  - Bass Clarinet Concerto (2014)
- Armin Schibler
  - Concertino for Clarinet and Strings Op.49 (1956)
- Mátyás Seiber
  - Concertino for Clarinet and String Orchestra
- Elie Siegmeister
  - Clarinet Concerto
- Artie Shaw
  - Concerto for Clarinet (Shaw)
- Frederick Speck
  - Concerto for Clarinet and Orchestra (1993)
- Yevhen Stankovych
  - Concerto for Clarinet solo
- Igor Stravinsky
  - Ebony Concerto for clarinet and jazz band (1945)
- Aurel Stroe
  - Concerto for Clarinet and Orchestra
- Toru Takemitsu
  - Fantasma/Cantos for clarinet and orchestra
- Josef Tal
  - Concerto for clarinet and orchestra
- Alexandre Tansman
  - Concertino for Oboe, Clarinet and Strings (1952)
  - Clarinet Concerto (1957)
- İstemihan Taviloğlu
  - Concerto for Clarinet and Orchestra
- Boris Tchaikovsky
  - Concerto for clarinet and chamber orchestra (1957)
- Frank Ticheli
  - Clarinet Concerto (2010)
- Henri Tomasi
  - Concerto for Clarinet and String Orchestra
  - Clarinet Concerto (2016)
- Joan Tower
  - Clarinet Concerto (1988)
- Unsuk Chin
  - Clarinet Concerto (2014)
- Sándor Veress
  - Clarinet Concerto
- Rolf Wallin
  - Clarinet Concerto (1998)
- Douglas Weiland
  - Clarinet Concerto, Op.30 (2001)
- Alex Weiser
  - Tfiles Clarinet Concerto (2024)
- Norma Wendelburg
  - Concerto for Clarinet and Orchestra
- John Williams
  - Clarinet Concerto for Michele Zukovsky (1991)
- Isang Yun
  - Clarinet Concerto (1981)
- Marilyn J. Ziffrin
  - Clarinet Concerto
- Ellen Taaffe Zwilich
  - Clarinet Concerto (2002)

== See also ==
- List of concert works for saxophone
- Oboe concerto
- Bassoon concerto
