= Clarinet Concerto (disambiguation) =

Clarinet Concerto is any concerto for clarinet.

Clarinet Concerto may also refer to:

- Clarinet Concerto (Carter)
- Clarinet Concerto (Copland)
- Clarinet Concerto (Corigliano)
- Clarinet Concerto (Eybler)
- Clarinet Concerto (Francaix)
- Clarinet Concerto (Hindemith)
- Clarinet Concerto (Lindberg)
- Clarinet Concerto (Mozart)
- Clarinet Concerto (Nielsen)
- Clarinet Concerto (Piston)
- Clarinet Concerto (Rouse)
- Clarinet Concerto (Tower)
- Clarinet Concerto (Zwilich)

== See also ==
- Clarinet Concerto No. 1 (disambiguation)
- Clarinet Concerto No. 2 (disambiguation)
