= List of compositions by Jean Françaix =

Below is a sortable list of compositions by Jean Françaix. The works are categorized by genre, date of composition and titles.

Scores by Françaix are published mainly by Schott Music, Éditions Transatlantiques, Éditions Max Eschig and Éditions Gérard Billaudot.

Genre	Date	Original title (French title)	English title	Scoring	Notes
Vocal	1932	Cinq chansons pour les enfants	5 Songs for Children	children's chorus (2 voices) and piano	words by the composer
Concertante	1932	Concertino pour piano et orchestre	Concertino	piano and orchestra	dedicated to Nadia Boulanger; choreographed by George Balanchine as the ballet Concertino in 1952
Keyboard	1932	Scherzo	Scherzo	piano	dedicated to Isidor Philipp
Ballet	1933	Beach	Beach		libretto after René Kerdyk
Chamber music	1933	Divertissement pour trio à cordes et piano	Divertissement	violin, viola, cello and piano	
Chamber music	1933	Quatuor à vents	Quartet for Winds	flute, oboe, clarinet and bassoon	
Ballet	1933	Scuola di ballo	Scuola di ballo		based on themes by Luigi Boccherini; libretto after the comedy La scuola di ballo (The Dance School) by Carlo Goldoni; written for Ballets Russes de Monte-Carlo
Keyboard	1933, 1966	Scuola di ballo	Scuola di ballo	2 pianos	originally a ballet
Chamber music	1933	Septett	Septet	flute, oboe, bassoon, 2 violins, cello and piano	
Chamber music	1933	Trio à cordes	String Trio	violin, viola and cello	
Chamber music	1934	Quintette n° 1 pour flûte, harpe et trio à cordes	Flute Quintet No. 1	flute, violin, viola, cello and harp	
Orchestral	1934	Sérénade pour petit orchestre	Sérénade	chamber (small) orchestra	choreographed by George Balanchine as the ballet À la Françaix in 1951
Chamber music	1934	Sérénade pour violoncelle et piano	Sérénade	cello and piano	adapted by Maurice Gendron from the Sérénade for chamber orchestra
Chamber music	1934	Sonatine pour violon et piano	Sonatina	violin and piano	
Concertante	1934	Suite pour violon et orchestre	Suite	violin and orchestra	
Vocal	1934	Trois duos: 1. Les oiseaux 2. Prière de sulpicia 3. Les grenouilles	3 Duos	2 sopranos, 2 violins, viola and cello	1. words by Aristophanes; 2. words by Sainte Tulle; 3. words by Homer
Concertante	1935	Divertissement pour trio à cordes et orchestre	Divertissement	violin, viola, cello and orchestra (winds, percussion, harp and double basses)	
Concertante	1935	Fantaisie pour violoncelle et orchestre	Fantaisie	cello and orchestra	
Ballet	1935	Le roi nu	The Naked King		in 1 act, 4 scenes; libretto and choreography by Serge Lifar after The Emperor's New Clothes by Hans Christian Andersen
Ballet	1935	Les malheurs de Sophie	Sophie's Misfortunes		in 3 scenes; libretto by G. Flévitzky after the novel by Comtesse de Ségur; dedicated to Madame la Comtesse Jean Pastré
Chamber music	1935	Petit quatuor de saxophones	Little Quartet of Saxophones	4 saxophones	
Chamber music	1935, 1992	Petit quatuor pour clarinettes et cor de basset	Little Quartet	2 clarinets, basset horn and bass clarinet	original for 4 saxophones
Concertante	1935	Quadruple concerto	Quadruple Concerto	flute, oboe, clarinet, bassoon and orchestra	
Keyboard	1936	Cinq portraits de jeunes filles	5 Portraits of Young Girls	piano	dedicated to Isidor Philipp
Concertante	1936	Concerto pour piano et orchestre	Concerto	piano and orchestra	dedicated to Nadia Boulanger
Ballet	1936	La lutherie enchantée	La lutherie enchantée		in 1 scene; dedicated to Sonja Korty
Ballet	1936	Le jeu sentimental	Le jeu sentimental		in 7 movements; libretto by the composer
Opera	1937	Le diable boiteux	The Devil upon Two Sticks	tenor, bass and chamber orchestra	Comic Chamber Opera after the novel by Alain-René Le Sage; dedicated to Princesse Edmond de Polignac
Film score	1937	Les perles de la couronne	The Pearls of the Crown		directed by Sacha Guitry and Christian-Jaque
Chamber music	1937	Musique de cour	Musique de cour	flute, violin and piano	also for flute, violin and orchestra
Concertante	1937	Musique de cour	Musique de cour	flute, violin and orchestra	also for flute, violin and piano
Ballet	1938	Le jugement d'un fou	Le jugement d'un fou		in 1 act; libretto after François Rabelais
Chamber music	1938	Quatuor à cordes	String Quartet	2 violins, viola and cello	
Ballet	1938	Verreries de Venise	Glassworks of Venice		in 1 scene after Mme. Fauchier-Magnan
Vocal	1938	Trois épigrammes: 1. À une demoiselle malade 2. Levez ces couvre-chefs 3. Belaud, mon petit chat gris	3 Epigrams	soprano or tenor and piano (or string quintet, or string orchestra)	1. words by Clément Marot; 2. words by Charles d'Orléans; 3. words by Joachim du Bellay
Choral	1939	L'apocalypse selon St. Jean	The Apocalypse according to St. John	4 soloists, mixed chorus and 2 orchestras	Oratorio fantastique in 3 parts; setting of the Revelation of Saint John the Divine
Keyboard	1939	L'apocalypse selon St. Jean	The Apocalypse according to St. John	organ and 2 trumpets	Suite arranged by Jürgen Essl (1994)
Opera	1940	L'apostrophe	The Apostrophe		Musical Comedy; libretto after Honoré de Balzac
Vocal	1941	L'adolescence clémentine, Cinq poêmes de Clément Marot: 1. De Jan-jan; 2. Mon cœur est tout endormy 3. D'une vieille dame fort pâle et d'un vieil gentilhomme 4. Complainte; 5. Avant naissance	L'Adolescence clémentine, 5 Poems of Clément Marot	baritone and piano	words by Clément Marot; dedicated to Pierre Bernac and Francis Poulenc
Chamber music	1942	Divertissement pour basson et quintette à cordes	Divertissement	bassoon, 2 violins, viola, cello and double bass	dedicated to William Waterhouse
Concertante	1942	Divertissement pour basson et orchestre à cordes	Divertissement	bassoon and string orchestra	dedicated to William Waterhouse
Film score	1942	Le Lit à colonnes	Le Lit à colonnes		directed by Roland Tual
Chamber music	1944	Mouvement perpétuel	Mouvement perpétuel	cello and piano	
Opera	1945	La main de gloire	The Hand of Glory		after the novel by Gérard de Nerval
Vocal	1946	Cinq poémes de Charles d'Orléans: 1. En regardant ces belles fleurs 2. Laissez-moi penser à mon aise 3. Petit mercier! Petit pannier!; 4. Je ne vois rien qui ne m'ennuie 5. Encore est vive la souris	5 Poems of Charles d'Orléans	voice and piano	words by Charles d'Orléans
Vocal	1946	Invocation à la volupté	Invocation à la volupté	baritone and orchestra	words by Jean de La Fontaine
Orchestral	1946	La douce France, Suite pour orchestre	La douce France, Suite	orchestra	
Orchestral	1946	Les bosquets de Cythère, Sept valses pour orchestre	The Groves of Cythera, 7 Waltzes	orchestra	
Concertante	1946	Rhapsodie pour alto et orchestre	Rhapsodie	viola and orchestra	transcribed for viola and piano by the composer in 1993
Chamber music	1993	Rhapsodie pour alto et piano	Rhapsodie	viola and piano	original for viola and orchestra (1946)
Chamber music	1947	Divertissement pour hautbois, clarinette et basson (ou trio d'anches)	Divertissement	oboe, clarinet and bassoon	
Vocal	1947	Juvenalia, Scènes de la Rome antique	Juvenalia, Scenes from Ancient Rome	soprano, alto, tenor, bass and piano 4-hands	words by Juvenal
Keyboard	1947	Éloge de la danse, Six épigraphes de Paul Valéry	In Praise of Dancing, 6 Epigraphs by Paul Valéry	piano	dedicated to François Valéry
Chamber music	1947	L'heure du berger, Musique de brasserie	The Shepherd's Hour, Brewery Music	flute, oboe, clarinet, bassoon, horn and piano	also arranged for flute, oboe, 2 clarinets, 2 bassoons, horn, trombone and piano by Friedrich Wanek (1972)
Concertante	1947	L'heure du berger, Musique de brasserie: 1. Les vieux beaux 2. Pin-up Girls; 3. Les petits nerveux	The Shepherd's Hour, Brewery Music	piano and orchestra	
Vocal	1947	Prière du soir et Chanson: 1. Prière du soir 2. Chanson	Prière du soir and Chanson	tenor and guitar (or piano)	dedicated to Hugues Cuénod and Hermann Leeb; 1. words by Agrippa d'Aubigné; 2. words by Clément Marot
Ballet	1948	Les demoiselles de la nuit, Ballet de chats	The Ladies of the Night, Ballet for Cats		in 1 act, 2 scenes; based on an idea by Jean Anouilh
Chamber music	1948	Quintette à vent n° 1	Wind Quintet No. 1	flute, oboe, clarinet, bassoon and horn	
Orchestral	1948	Symphonie d'archets	Symphonie d'archets (Symphony of Bows)	string orchestra	
Vocal	1949	Huit anecdotes de Chamfort: 1. L'évêque d'Autun; 2. Les coups de pieds 3. Le critique 4. Le cauchemar 5. Les cinq doigts 6. Le magistrat suisse 7. De quelques Français; 8. Le chanoine Récupéro	8 Anecdotes of Chamfort	baritone and piano	words by Nicolas Chamfort; dedicated to Alexis Roland-Manuel
Vocal	1949	Scherzo impromptu	Scherzo impromptu	baritone or bass and piano	song from the collaborative work Mouvements du cœur: Un hommage à la mémoire de Frédéric Chopin, 1849–1949; words by Louise Lévêque de Vilmorin
Ballet	1950	Die Kamelien	The Camellias		Pantomime for actors in 6 scenes with string orchestra; libretto by Sonia Korty
Film score	1950	Les fêtes galantes (Watteau)	Les fêtes galantes (Watteau)		short film directed by Jean Aurel
Orchestral	1950	Les zigues de Mars, Petit ballet militaire à la mémoire de Courteline	Les zigues de Mars, Little Military Ballet in Memory of Courteline	orchestra	dedication: "Pour Paul Bonneau et son orchestre"
Choral	1950	L'ode à la Gastronomie	L'ode à la Gastronomie	mixed chorus (16 voices) a cappella	words by the composer after La physiologie du goût by Jean Anthelme Brillat-Savarin
Concertante	1950	Variations de concert	Variations de Concert	cello and string orchestra	
Chamber music	1950	Sonatine pour trompette et piano	Sonatina	trumpet and piano	withdrawn; revised in 1975 as Prélude, sarabande et gigue
Ballet	1951	À la Françaix	À la Françaix		choreographed by George Balanchine using the 1934 orchestral score Sérénade pour petit orchestre
Transcription	1951	Introduction et polonaise brillante, Op. 3	Introduction and Polonaise brillante, Op. 3	cello and orchestra	original work for cello and piano by Frédéric Chopin
Chamber music	1951	Nocturne	Nocturne	cello and piano	adapted by Maurice Gendron from the ballet "Les demoiselles de la nuit"
Vocal	1952	La cantate de Méphisto	La cantate de Méphisto	bass and string orchestra	words from Mon Faust by Paul Valéry; dedicated to American bass Doda Conrad
Ballet	1952	Le roi Midas	King Midas		libretto after Jean-Étienne Daviel
Chamber music	1953	Berceuse	Berceuse	cello and piano	adapted by Maurice Gendron from the opera "L'apostrophe"
Chamber music	1953	Canon à l'octave	Canon in Octave	horn and piano	
Chamber music	1953	Divertimento pour flûte et piano	Divertimento	flute and piano	dedicated to Jean-Pierre Rampal; orchestrated in 1974 at the request of Ransom Wilson.
Concertante	1974	Divertimento pour flûte et orchestre	Divertimento	flute and orchestra	original for flute and piano (1953; orchestrated at the request of Ransom Wilson. The orchestral version includes substantial changes in the solo flute part.
Chamber music	1953	Les vacances: 1. Le départ 2. Les devoirs de vacances 3. L'invité de marque 4. La petite camarade 5. La promenade en voiture 6. Faîtes de beaux rêves	Les vacances	2 violins, cello and piano	
Keyboard	1953	L'insectarium: 1. La scolopendre 2. La coccinelle 3. L'argyronète; 4. Les talitres 5. Le scarabée 6. Les fourmis	The Insectarium: 1. The Scolopendra; 2. The Ladybird; 3. The Diving Bell Spider; 4. The Sand Hoppers; 5. The Beetle; 6. Ants	harpsichord	
Chamber music	1953	Rondino staccato	Rondino staccato	cello and piano	adapted by Maurice Gendron from the opera "Le diable boiteux"
Film score	1953	Si Versailles m'était conté	Royal Affairs in Versailles		directed by Sacha Guitry; released in 1954
Keyboard	1953	Si Versailles m'était conté: 1. Henry IV; 2. Louis XIII; 3. Monsieur de Montespan; 4. La Voisin; 5. Le grand Trianon; 6. Jeune fille 7. Ronde Louis XV (à 4 mains); 8. Le beau Fersen; 9. Le Hameau (à 4 mains); 10. Napoléon; 11. Les cent marches	Si Versailles m'était conté	piano 2- and 4-hands	Suite from the film score Royal Affairs in Versailles: 7. for piano 4-hands; 9. for piano 4-hands
Orchestral	1953, 1954	Si Versailles m'était conté	Si Versailles m'était conté	orchestra	Suite from the film Royal Affairs in Versailles
Orchestral	1953	Symphonie en sol majeur	Symphony in G major	orchestra	"À la mémoire de Joseph Haydn" (In memory of Joseph Haydn); dedicated to Nikolai Sokoloff and the Musical Arts Orchestra of La Jolla
Keyboard	1954	Napoléon: 1. Marche militaire enfantine 2. Brienne; 3. La soirée chez Barras; 4. La Monaco; 5. Musique arabe 6. La fuite des cinq-cents 7. Marche française 8. Marche autrichienne 9. Berceuse du Roi de Rome; 10. Mazurka; 11. Polonaise en ré 12. Marie Walewska; 13. Marche tragique 14. Valse viennoise 15. Louis XVIII; 16. Marche Impériale	Napoléon	piano 4-hands	Suite from the film by Sacha Guitry
Opera	1954	Paris, à nous deux!, ou Le nouveau Rastignac	Paris, à nous deux!, ou Le nouveau Rastignac	soloists, chorus and 4 saxophones	Opera buffa in 1 act, 2 scenes; libretto by France Roche and the composer
Film score	1955	Napoléon	Napoléon		directed by Sacha Guitry
Orchestral	1955	Sérénade B E A	Sérénade B E A	string orchestra	
Orchestral	1956	Au musée Grévin	At the Musée Grévin	orchestra	Suite from the short film by Jacques Demy
Vocal	1956	Déploration de tonton (Chien fidèle)	Lamentation of Tonton (Faithful Dog)	mezzo-soprano and string ensemble (3 violins, 3 violas, cello and double bass)	words by Georges Ravon
Keyboard	1956	Marche solennelle (Marche du sacre)	Marche Solennelle (Marche du Sacre)	organ	transcribed for wind orchestra by Paul Semler-Collery
Chamber music	1956	Prélude en la mineur	Prélude in A minor	guitar solo	
Film score	1956	Si Paris nous était conté	If Paris Were Told to Us		directed by Sacha Guitry
Orchestral	1956	Six grandes marches dans le style du Premier Empire: 1. March française 2. March autrichienne 3. Marche polonaise 4. Marche du sacre 5. Marche russe 6. Marche européenne	6 Grand Marches	orchestra	Suite from the film Napoléon by Sacha Guitry: 6. transcribed for wind orchestra by Paul Semler-Collery
Keyboard	1956	Six grandes marches dans le style du Premier Empire: 1. March française 2. March autrichienne 3. Marche polonaise 4. Marche du sacre 5. Marche russe 6. Marche européenne	6 Grand Marches	piano	from the film Napoléon by Sacha Guitry
Film score	1957	Assassins et voleurs	Lovers and Thieves		directed by Sacha Guitry
Vocal	1957	La chatte blanche	The White Cat	tenor and piano or chamber orchestra	based on the fairy tale by Madame d'Aulnoy
Keyboard	1957	Huit danses exotiques	8 Exotic Dances	2 pianos	transcription for wind ensemble (1981)
Chamber music	1981	Huit danses exotiques	8 Exotic Dances	flute, piccolo, 2 oboes, 2 clarinets, 2 bassoons, 2 horns, trumpet and percussion	original for 2 pianos (1951)
Ballet	1957	La dame dans la lune	The Lady in the Moon	orchestra	libretto on an idea of Roland Petit
Keyboard	1958	Danse des trois arlequins	Danse des trois arlequins	piano	
Film score	1958	Le Musée Grévin	Le Musée Grévin	orchestra	short film directed by Jacques Demy
Concertante	1959	Concerto pour clavecin et orchestre	Harpsichord Concerto	harpsichord and instrumental ensemble (flute and string orchestra)	dedicated to Nadia Boulanger
Concertante	1959	Divertimento pour cor et orchestre	Divertimento	horn and orchestra	
Chamber music	1959	Divertimento pour cor et piano	Divertimento	horn and piano	
Film score	1959	La prima notte	Venetian Honeymoon	orchestra	directed by Alberto Cavalcanti; French title: Les noces vénitiennes
Concertante	1959	L'horloge de flore	L'horloge de flore (The Flower-Clock)	oboe and orchestra	
Film score	1960	Le dialogue des carmélites	Dialogue with the Carmelites		directed by Philippe Agostini and Raymond Léopold Bruckberger
Orchestral	1960	Le dialogue des carmélites	Dialogue with the Carmelites	orchestra	Suite from the film
Orchestral	1960	Ode sur la naissance de Vénus	Ode sur la naissance de Vénus	string orchestra	
Chamber music	1960	Scuola di celli, Dix pièces	Scuola di celli (School of Cellos), 10 Pieces	10 cellos	
Keyboard	1960	Sonate pour piano	Sonata	piano	dedicated to İdil Biret
Transcription	1960	Souvenir de Munich [sic]	Souvenir de Munich [sic]	orchestra	original for piano 4-hands, Souvenirs de Munich (1885–1886), by Emmanuel Chabrier
Keyboard	1960	Suite carmélite: 1. Sœur Blanche; 2. Mère Marie de l'Incarnation; 3. Sœur Anne de la Croix; 4. Sœur Constance; 5. Sœur Mathilde; 6. Mère Marie de Saint-Augustin	Suite carmélite	organ	dedicated to Pierre Cochereau
Film score	1960	XYZ	XYZ		short film directed by Philippe Lifchitz
Chamber music	1961	Cinq danses exotiques	5 Exotic Dances	alto saxophone and piano	dedicated to Marcel Mule
Film score	1962	La croix et la bannière	La croix et la bannière		directed by Philippe Ducrest
Transcription	1962	L'Histoire de Babar, le petit éléphant	The Story of Babar, the Little Elephant	narrator and orchestra	original for narrator and piano by Francis Poulenc
Chamber music	1962	Suite pour flûte	Suite	flute solo	
Chamber music	1962	Fantaisie pour violoncelle et piano	Fantaisie	cello and piano	piano reduction from Fantaisie (1935) for cello and orchestra
Vocal	1963	La grenouille qui se veut faire aussi grosse que le bœuf	The Frog Who Wished to Be as Big as an Ox	soprano or tenor and piano, or 2 tenors, 2 baritones and piano	story by Jean de La Fontaine
Choral	1963	La grenouille qui se veut faire aussi grosse que le bœuf	The Frog Who Wished to Be as Big as an Ox	male chorus and piano	story by Jean de La Fontaine
Vocal	1963	Le coq et le renard	The Rooster and the Fox	soprano or tenor and piano, or 2 tenors, 2 baritones and piano	story by Jean de La Fontaine
Choral	1963	Le coq et le renard	The Rooster and the Fox	male chorus and piano	story by Jean de La Fontaine
Chamber music	1963	Le coq et le renard	The Rooster and the Fox	4 bassoons (and piano)	Though stated as being for 4 bassoons, the parts are identical to those of the male chorus parts and therefore require the piano accompaniment.
Orchestral	1963	Six préludes	6 Préludes (Sei preludi)	string orchestra	
Opera	1964	La princesse de Clèves	La Princesse de Clèves		in 4 acts; based on the novel by Madame de La Fayette
Transcription	1964	Preludio et momento capriccioso	Preludio et Momento capriccioso	2 violins, viola, cello and harp	original for piano by Carl Maria von Weber
Ballet	1965	Adages et variations	Adages et Variations		after Histoire de Babar by Jean de Brunhoff
Keyboard	1965	Cinq "Bis": 1. Pour allécher l'auditoire 2. Pour les dames sentimentales 3. En cas de succès 4. En cas de triomphe 5. En cas de délire	5 Encores	piano	dedicated to Nadia Boulanger
Concertante	1965	Concerto pour deux pianos et orchestre	Concerto	2 pianos and orchestra	
Film score	1965	Lady L	Lady L		directed by Peter Ustinov
Concertante	1966	Concerto pour flûte et orchestre	Concerto	flute and orchestra	
Concertante	1967	Concerto pour clarinette et orchestre	Concerto	clarinet and orchestra	dedicated to Fernand Oubradous; premiere given by clarinetist Jacques Lancelot in 1968
Ballet	1967	Le croupier amoureux	Le croupier amoureux		in 1 act; libretto by François-Régis Bastide
Transcription	1967	24 Préludes, Op. 28	24 Préludes, Op. 28	orchestra	original for piano by Frédéric Chopin
Concertante	1969	Jeu poétique en six mouvements	Jeu poétique en six mouvements	harp and orchestra	dedicated to Pearl Chertok
Concertante	1970	Concerto n° 1 pour violon et orchestre	Violin Concerto No. 1	violin and orchestra	dedicated to Roger André
Chamber music	1970	Quatuor pour cor anglais, violon, alto et violoncelle	English horn Quartet	English horn, violin, viola and cello	dedicated to Janet Craxton
Vocal	1971	Les inestimables chroniques du bon géant Gargantua	The Inestimable Chronicles of the Good Giant Gargantua	narrator and string orchestra	story after Gargantua by François Rabelais
Keyboard	1971	Quinze portraits d'enfants d'Auguste Renoir: 1. Le bébé à la cuiller 2. Jeune Bretonne; 3. Adolescente se peignant 4. Fillette lisant 5. Les deux sœurs 6. Au Jardin du Luxembourg; 7. Fillette au chapeau bleu 8. Fillette à la gerbe 9. Mademoiselle Cahen d'Anvers; 10. La petite pêcheuse 11. Mademoiselle Grimprel au ruban bleu 12. Au piano 13. Fillette au chapeau à plume rose 14. Les enfants de Madame Charpentier; 15. Le petit collégien	15 Portraits of Children from Auguste Renoir	piano 4-hands	inspired by pictures of children by Auguste Renoir; suitable for teaching
Orchestral	1971	Quinze portraits d'enfants d'Auguste Renoir	15 Portraits of Children from Auguste Renoir	string orchestra	inspired by pictures of children by Auguste Renoir
Chamber music	1971	Sept danses, Dixtuor à vent	7 Dances, Wind Dectet	2 flutes, 2 oboes, 2 clarinets, 2 horns and 2 bassoons	after the 1935 ballet Les malheurs de Sophie; dedicated to Klaus Rainer Schöll
Orchestral	1971	Thème et variations pour orchestre	Theme and Variations	orchestra	
Chamber music	1971	Trio pour flûte, harpe et violoncelle	Trio	flute, cello and harp	dedicated to Trio Nordmann
Chamber music	1972	Octuor	Octet	clarinet, bassoon, horn, 2 violins, viola, cello and double bass	"dédié à l'Octuor de Paris et composé à la mémoire vénérée de Franz Schubert"
Orchestral	1973	La ville mystérieuse, Fantaisie pour grand orchestre	La ville mystérieuse, Fantasy	orchestra	based on a novella by Jules Verne
Chamber music	1973	Neuf pièces caractéristiques, Dixtuor à vent	9 Character Pieces, Wind Dectet	2 flutes, 2 oboes 2 clarinets, 2 bassoons and 2 horns	
Transcription	1973	Six impromptus et moments musicaux	6 Impromptus and Moments Musicaux	flute, violin, viola, cello and harp	original works for piano by Franz Schubert
Chamber music	1974	Aubade	Aubade	12 cellos	dedicated to the cello section of the Berlin Philharmonic "pour mes célèbres Interprètes (et néanmoins Amis)"
Concertante	1974	Concerto pour contrebasse et orchestre	Concerto	double bass and orchestra	dedicated to double bassist Wolfgang Güttler
Concertante	1974	Impromptu pour flûte et orchestre à cordes	Impromptu	flute and string orchestra (11 players)	published 1983
Concertante	1974	Le gay Paris	Le gay Paris	trumpet and wind instruments (flute, 2 oboes, 2 clarinets, 2 horns, bassoon, contrabassoon)	
Chamber music	1974	Passacaille	Passacaille	guitar solo	
Chamber music	1974	Tema con variazioni	Theme and Variations	clarinet and piano	orchestrated in 1978
Concertante	1978	Tema con variazioni	Theme and Variations	clarinet and orchestra	original version for clarinet and piano (1974)
Orchestral	1975	Cassazione per 3 orchestre	Cassazione	3 orchestras	
Transcription	1975	Cinq sonates	5 Sonatas	flute, violin, viola, cello and harp	original for piano by Domenico Scarlatti
Chamber music	1975	Cinque piccoli duetti	5 Little Duets	flute and harp	dedicated to Christian Lardé and Marie-Claire Jamet
Keyboard	1975	De la musique avant toute chose, Dix pièces enfantines (Zehn Stücke für Kinder zum Spielen und Träumen)	10 Pieces for Children to Play and Dream	piano	
Chamber music	1975	Prélude, sarabande et gigue	Prélude, sarabande et gigue	trumpet and piano	revision of Sonatine pour trompette et piano (1952); also orchestrated
Concertante	1975	Prélude, sarabande et gigue	Prélude, sarabande et gigue	trumpet and orchestra	original for trumpet and piano; revision of Sonatine pour trompette et piano (1952)
Concertante	1976	Chaconne	Chaconne	harp and 11 string instruments	
Concertante	1976	Concerto grosso	Concerto grosso	flute, oboe, clarinet, bassoon, horn, 2 violins, viola, cello, double bass and orchestra	
Vocal	1976	La promenade à Versailles, Cantate	La promenade à Versailles, Cantata	2 tenors, 2 baritones and 11 string instruments	words by Jean de La Fontaine
Chamber music	1976	Thème varié	Theme and Variations	double bass solo	
Concertante	1976	Variations sur un thème plaisant	Variations sur un thème plaisant	piano and 2 flutes, 2 oboes 2 clarinets, 2 horns and 2 bassoons (contrabassoon)	
Keyboard	1977	Deux pièces pour clavecin	2 Pieces	harpsichord	dedicated to Joël Forgues
Chamber music	1977	Quintette pour clarinette en si♭ et quatuor à cordes	Clarinet Quintet	clarinet, 2 violins, viola and cello	dedicated to Eduard Brunner
Chamber music	1977	Sept impromptus	7 Impromptus	flute and bassoon	
Concertante	1978	Concerto pour deux harpes et orchestre	Concerto	2 harps and orchestra	
Vocal	1978	La cantate des Vieillards: 1. La vieille tante de Rouen; 2. Menuet; 3. Un congrès féministe	La cantate des Vieillards	tenor, bass and 11 string instruments	based on works by Guy de Maupassant
Orchestral	1978	Ouverture anacréontique	Ouverture anacréontique (Anacreontic Overture)	orchestra	
Chamber music	1978	Quasi improvvisando	Quasi improvvisando	flute, piccolo, 2 oboes, clarinet, bass clarinet, bassoon, contrabassoon, 2 horns and trumpet	dedicated to conductor Heinz Zeebe
Chamber music	1978	Serenata	Serenata (Serenade)	guitar solo	
Chamber music	1978	Suite pour harpe	Suite	harp solo	dedicated to Bernard Galais
Concertante	1979	Concerto pour basson et 11 instruments à cordes (ou piano)	Bassoon Concerto	bassoon and 11 string instruments (or piano)	dedicated to bassoonist and composer Maurice Allard
Concertante	1979	Concerto n° 2 pour violon et ensemble instrumental	Violin Concerto No. 2	violin and instrumental ensemble	
Chamber music	1979	Les petits Paganini	Les petits Paganini	violin solo and 4 violins	
Chamber music	1979	Petite valse européenne pour tuba et double quintette à vents	Little European Waltz	tuba and double wind quintet (2 flutes, 2 oboes, 2 clarinets, 2 bassoons and 2 horns)	
Chamber music	1980	Duo baroque	Duo baroque	double bass and harp	
Chamber music	1980	Huit bagatelles	8 bagatelles	2 violins, viola, cello and piano	premiered by the composer and the Kolisch Quartet at the Vienna Konzerthaus
Chamber music	1980	Marche triomphale	Marche Triomphale	4 trumpets and organ	
Ballet	1980	Pierrot ou les secrets de la nuit	Pierrot ou les secrets de la nuit (Pierrot or the Secrets of the Night)	orchestra	in 1 act for 3 dancers; libretto by Michel Tournier
Chamber music	1980	Tema con 8 variazioni	Theme and 8 Variations	violin solo	dedicated to Michael Goldstein
Chamber music	1981	Mozart new-look, Petite fantaisie pour contrebasse et instruments à vent sur la Sérénade de "Don Giovanni"	Mozart New-Look, Little Fantasy on the Serenade from "Don Giovanni"	double bass and wind dectet (2 flute, 2 oboes, 2 clarinets, bassoon, contrabassoon, 2 horns)	based on the aria "Deh, vieni alla finestra" from Don Giovanni by Wolfgang Amadeus Mozart and also quotes the aria "Près des remparts de Séville" from act I of Carmen by Georges Bizet
Vocal	1981	Psyché, Féerie pour récitant et orchestre	Psyché, Fable	narrator and orchestra	story by Jean de La Fontaine
Chamber music	1982	Divertissement pour deux guitares	Divertissement	2 guitars	
Keyboard	1982	Huit variations sur le nom de Johannes Gutenberg	8 Variations on the Name of Johannes Gutenberg	piano	thematic material is a musical cryptogram on the name of Johannes Gutenberg
Chamber music	1982	Onze variations sur un thème de Haydn	11 Variations on a Theme of Haydn	2 oboes, 2 clarinets, 2 horns, 2 bassoons, 2 horns, trumpet and double bass	based on movement I of the Surprise Symphony by Joseph Haydn
Choral	1982	Trois poèmes de Paul Valéry: 1. Aurore; 2. Cantique des colonnes 3. Le sylphe	3 Poems of Paul Valéry	mixed chorus a cappella	words by Paul Valéry
Concertante	1982–1983	Concerto pour guitare et orchestre à cordes	Guitar Concerto	guitar and string orchestra	premiered by Narciso Yepes on May 25, 1984 at the Schwetzinger Festspiele
Concertante	1983	Concerto pour trombone et 10 instruments à vent	Trombone Concerto	trombone and 10 wind instruments (2 flutes, 2 oboes, clarinet, bass clarinet, bassoon, contrabassoon and 2 horns)	recording premiere by Mark Eager and BBC NOW in 1995
Keyboard	1983	Trois esquisses sur les touches blanches, de difficulté progressive, à l'intention des jeunes pianistes: 1. Le chérubin provisoire 2. Le rêveur 3. Le diablotin libéré	3 Sketches on the White Keys	piano	progressive difficulty; intended for students
Transcription	1984	Huit pièces pittoresques	8 Pièces pittoresques	2 flutes, oboe, English horn, clarinet, bass clarinet, bassoon, contrabassoon and 2 horns	original Pièces pittoresques for piano by Emmanuel Chabrier
Chamber music	1984	Hommage à l'ami Papageno, Fantaisie sur les thèmes favoris de "La flûte enchantée" de W.A. Mozart pour piano et dix instruments à vent	Homage to Our Friend Papageno, Fantasia on Favorite Themes of "The Magic Flute" by Mozart	2 flutes (piccolo), oboe, English horn, clarinet, bass clarinet, bassoon, contrabassoon, 2 horns and piano	based on various themes from The Magic Flute ("Ein Mädchen oder Weibchen", "Der Vogelfänger bin ich ja", "Pa … pa … pa ...", etc.) by Wolfgang Amadeus Mozart
Chamber music	1984	Musique pour faire plaisir: 1. Petit valse – Introduction; 2. Élégie; 3. L'embarquement pour Cythère, Grande valse démocratique	Musique pour faire plaisir (Music to Give Pleasure)	2 flutes, 2 oboes, 2 clarinets, 2 bassoons and 2 horns	based on piano works of Francis Poulenc; 1. Valse en ut from Album des Six (1919); 2. Élégie for 2 pianos (1959) and Mélancholie (1940); 3. L'embarquement pour Cythère for 2 pianos (1951)
Chamber music	1984	Sonate pour flûte à bec (ou flûte) et guitare	Flute Sonata	recorder (or flute) and guitar	dedicated to Charles Limouse and Alain Prévost
Keyboard	1984	Suite profane	Suite profane	organ	
Orchestral	1985	Ode à la Liberté	Ode à la Liberté (Ode to Liberty)	wind orchestra	
Transcription	1985	Élégie	Élégie	2 violins, viola, cello and double bass	original work by Emmanuel Chabrier
Transcription	1985	Habanera	Habanera	cello and piano	original for piano by Emmanuel Chabrier
Keyboard	1986	Messe de mariage	Messe de Mariage (Wedding Mass)	organ	composed for the wedding of composer and organist Thomas Daniel Schlee at Église Saint-Sulpice, Paris
Chamber music	1986	Trio pour violon, violoncelle et piano	Piano Trio	violin, cello and piano	
Chamber music	1987	Dixtuor pour quintette à vent et quintette à cordes	Dectet	flute, oboe, clarinet, bassoon, horn, 2 violins, viola, cello and double bass	
Transcription	1987	Trois marches militaires	3 Milatary Marches	flute, piccolo, 2 oboes, 2 clarinets, bassoon, contrabassoon and 2 horns	original work by Franz Schubert
Keyboard	1987	La promenade d'un musicologue éclectique	The Eclectic Musicologist Takes a Stroll	piano	dedicated to Emile Naoumoff
Chamber music	1987	Noël nouvelet et Il est né, le Divin Enfant, Deux improvisations	Noël nouvelet and Il est né, le Divin Enfant, 2 Improvisations	12 cellos	dedicated to the cello section of the Berlin Philharmonic
Chamber music	1987, 1990	Notturno e Divertimento	Notturno e Divertimento	4 horns	
Orchestral	1987	Pavane pour un génie vivant	Pavane pour un génie vivant (Pavane for a Living Genius)	orchestra	dedication: "À la mémoire de Maurice Ravel, si présent parmi nous..." ("In memory of Maurice Ravel, so present among us...")
Chamber music	1987	Quintette à vent n° 2	Wind Quintet No. 2	flute, oboe, clarinet, bassoon and horn	dedicated to the Aulos Wind Quintet
Concertante	1988	Concerto pour quinze solistes et orchestre	Concerto for 15 Soloists and Orchestra	flute, oboe, clarinet, bassoon, contrabassoon, horn, trumpet, trombone, tuba, harp, 2 violins, viola, cello, double bass and orchestra	"Suivi d'une surprise" ("Followed by a surprise")
Chamber music	1988	Quintette pour flûte à bec (ou flûte), 2 violons, violoncelle et clavecin	Quintet for flute, string trio and harpsichord	recorder, 2 violins, cello and harpsichord	dedicated to Carl Dolmetsch
Transcription	1989	Cortège burlesque	Cortège burlesque	flute, piccolo, oboe, English horn, clarinet, bass clarinet, bassoon, contrabassoon and 2 horns	original for piano 4-hands by Emmanuel Chabrier
Chamber music	1989	Le colloque des deux perruches	Le colloque des deux perruches	flute and alto flute	dedicated to Roberto Fabbriciani
Chamber music	1989	Quintette n° 2 pour flûte, harpe et trio à cordes	Flute Quintet No. 2	flute, violin, viola, cello and harp	
Transcription	1989	Trois écossaises et variations sur un air populaire allemand	3 Écossaises et variations sur un air populaire allemand	2 flutes, 2 oboes, 2 clarinets, 2 bassoons and 2 horns	by Frédéric Chopin
Chamber music	1990	Élégie pour 10 instruments à vent	Élégie	flute, alto flute, oboe, English horn, basset horn, bass clarinet, bassoon, contrabassoon and 2 horns	"Pour commémorer le bicentenaire de la mort de W.A. Mozart" ("To commemorate the bicentennial of the death of Wolfgang Amadeus Mozart")
Chamber music	1990	Trio pour clarinette, alto et piano	Clarinet Trio	clarinet, viola and piano	
Chamber music	1990	Suite pour quatuor de saxophones	Suite	4 saxophones	
Concertante	1991	Double concerto pour flûte, clarinette et orchestre	Double Concerto	flute, clarinet and orchestra	dedicated to Dagmar Becker and Wolfgang Meyer
Orchestral	1991	Quatre-vingt cinq mesures et un Da Capo	Eighty-Five Measures and a Da Capo	chamber orchestra	
Chamber music	1991	Sixtuor	Wind Sextet	flute, oboe, clarinet, bass clarinet, bassoon and horn	
Vocal	1991	Triade de toujours, 3 Duos: 1. Débat du cœur et du corps de Villon; 2. Tircis et Amarante; 3. Vif entretien entre la dèche et l'argent	Triade de toujours	soprano, baritone, wind quintet, string quintet and harp	1. words by François Villon; 2. words by Jean de La Fontaine; 3. words by Aristophanes
Concertante	1993	Concerto pour accordéon et orchestre	Accordeon Concerto	accordion and orchestra	dedicated to Pascal Contet
Keyboard	1994	Nocturne	Nocturne	piano	dedication: "À la mémoire du grand Frédéric Chopin" ("In memory of the great Frédéric Chopin")
Chamber music	1994	Pour remercier l'auditoire	Pour remercier l'auditoire	flute, clarinet, horn, violin, cello and piano	
Chamber music	1994	Quatuor pour clarinette, cor de basset, clarinette basse et piano	Clarinet Quartet	clarinet, basset horn, bass clarinet and piano	
Chamber music	1994	Trio pour hautbois, basson et piano	Trio	oboe, bassoon and piano	dedicated to William Waterhouse
Transcription	1995	Nocturne et polonaise	Nocturne and Polonaise	orchestra	Nocturne in C minor, Op. 48 No. 1 and Polonaise in A♭ major, Op. 53 originally for piano by Frédéric Chopin; dedicated to Dr. Peter Hanser-Strecker
Chamber music	1995	Nonetto	Nonetto	oboe, clarinet, bassoon, horn, 2 violins, viola, cello and double bass	based on the Quintet in E♭ major for winds and piano, KV 452 by Wolfgang Amadeus Mozart
Chamber music	1995	Trio pour flûte, violoncelle et piano	Trio	flute, cello and piano	
Chamber music	1996	Célestes Schubertiades, Fantaisie sur des thèmes de Schubert	Célestes Schubertiades, Fantasy on Themes of Schubert	2 flutes (piccolo), oboe, English horn, 2 clarinets (bass clarinet), 2 bassoons (contrabassoon) and 2 horns	based on themes by Franz Schubert
Chamber music	1996	Deux pièces pour basson et piano	2 Pieces	bassoon and piano	dedicated to Cathérine Marchèse and Emile Naoumoff
Chamber music	1996	Sonate pour flûte et piano	Flute Sonata	flute and piano	
Vocal	1997	Neuf historiettes	9 Historiettes	baritone, tenor saxophone and piano	words by Gédéon Tallemant des Réaux
