= Clarinet Concerto No. 2 =

Clarinet Concerto No. 2 may refer to:

- Clarinet Concerto No. 2 (Arnold)
- Clarinet Concerto No. 2 (Weber)

== See also ==
- Clarinet Concerto (disambiguation)
- Clarinet Concerto No. 1 (disambiguation)
