= Introduction and Polonaise brillante (Chopin) =

1829 cello and piano piece by Frédéric Chopin

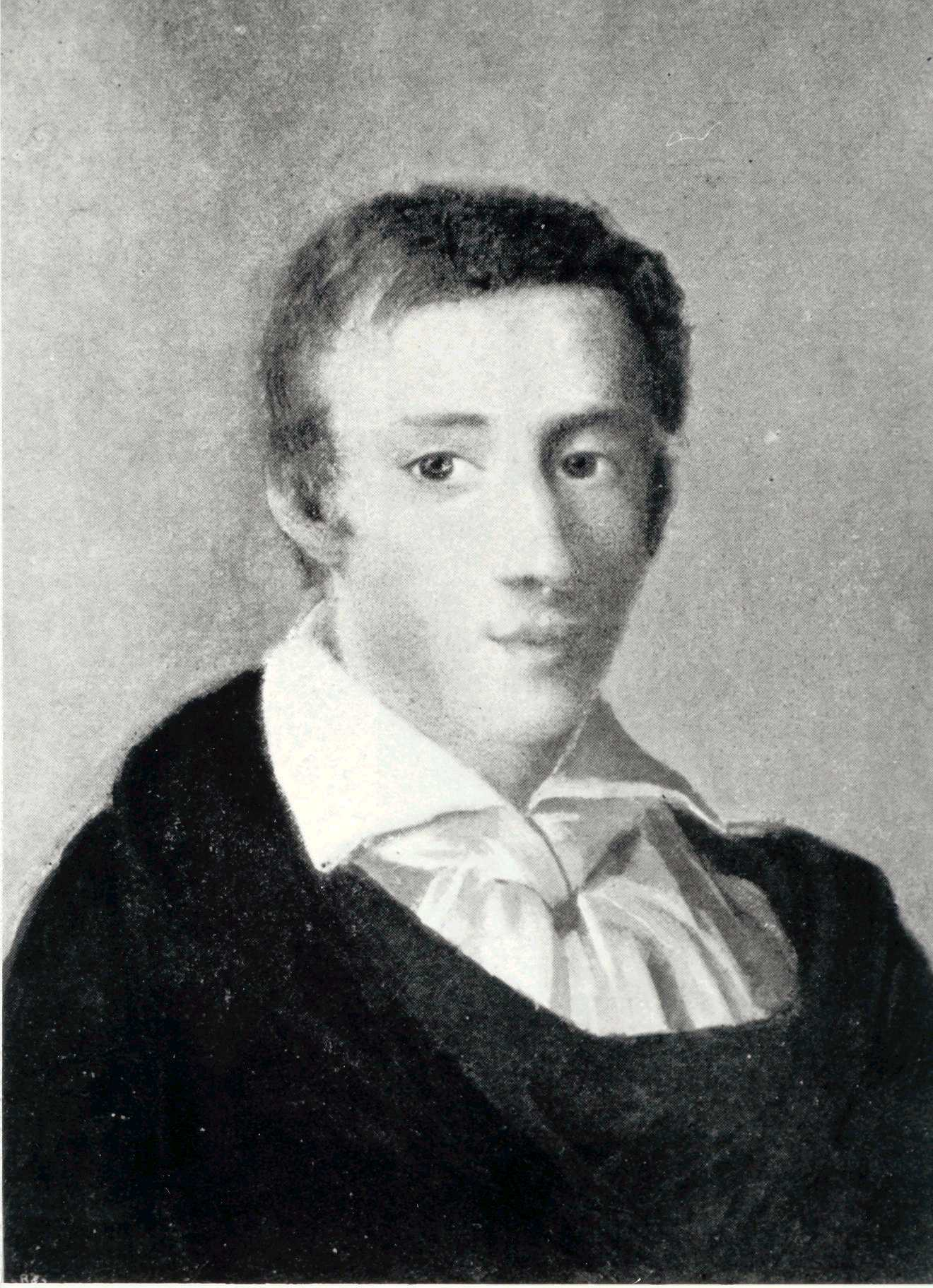
Frédéric Chopin, by Mieroszewski, 1829

Introduction and Polonaise brillante in C major, Op. 3, is a composition for cello and piano by Frédéric Chopin. It was one of Chopin's first published compositions.

The Polonaise was written between 20 and 28 October 1829 during a visit to the estate of Antoni Radziwiłł in Antonin. In a letter to Chopin's friend Tytus Woyciechowski, Chopin indicated that he wanted Princess Wanda, the daughter of Prince Antoni, to practice it. The Introduction was written in April 1830. The work was published in 1831 and dedicated to the Austrian cellist Joseph Merk. In a letter, Chopin wrote "On Thursday there was a soiree at Fuchs’s, when Limmer introduced some of his own compositions for four violoncellos. Merk as usual made them more beautiful than they really were by his playing, which is so full of soul. He is the only violoncellist I really respect".

A typical performance lasts about eight and a half minutes, although the total performance time may vary. Due to the relative simplicity of the cello part, many cellists often heavily embellish the melody, sometimes to the point of complete distinction from the original melody.

Jean Françaix orchestrated the work in 1951 in collaboration with Maurice Gendron. The score is published by Schott Music.
