= List of compositions by Leopold Koželuch =

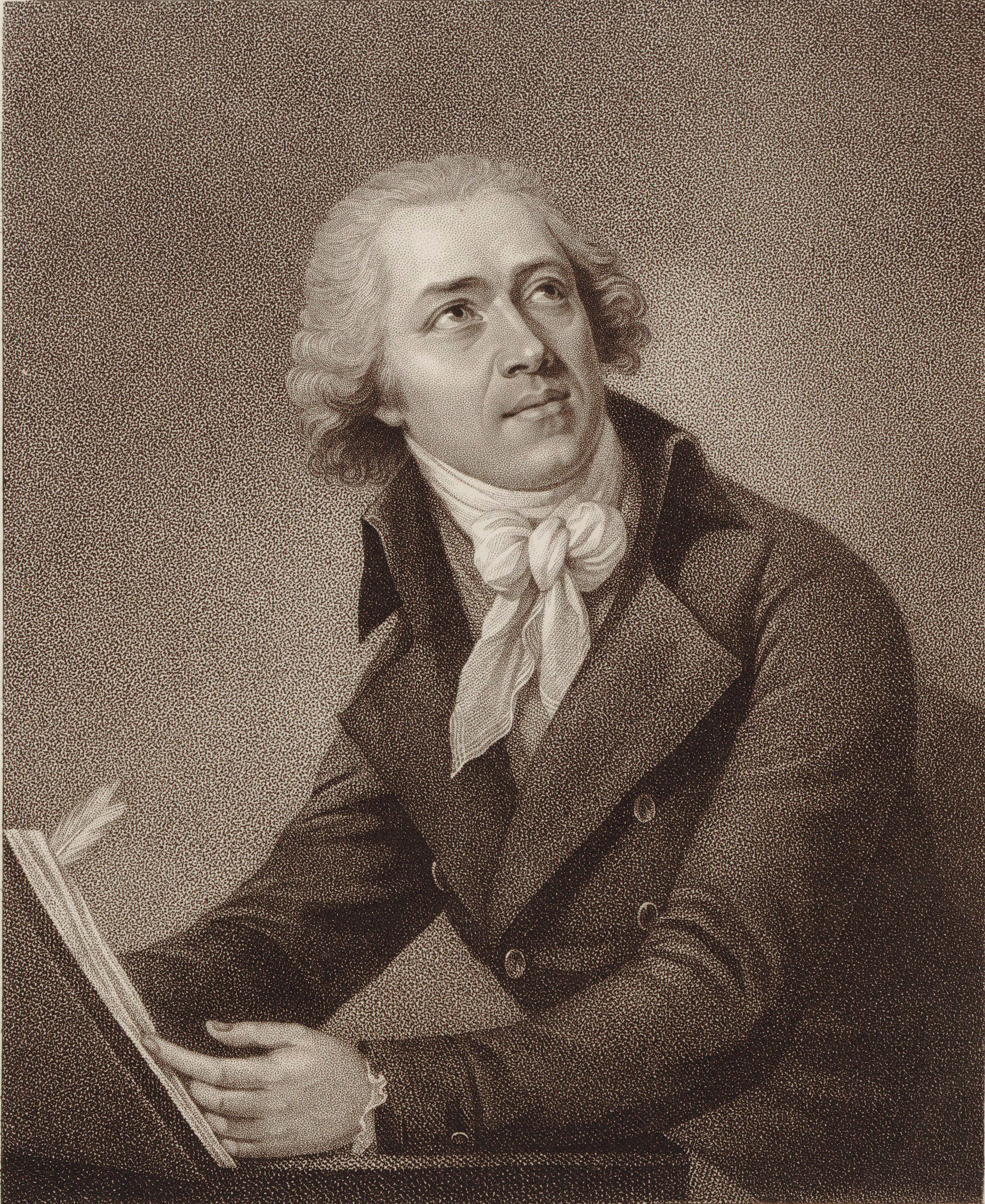
Leopold Koželuch

The classical composer Leopold Koželuch left around 400 compositions. Among these there are about thirty symphonies, twenty-two piano concertos, including a concerto for piano four-hands, arguably one of the best examples of this rare genre, two clarinet concertos, twenty-four violin sonatas, sixty-three piano trios, six string quartets, two oratorios (one of which, Moses in Ägypten, has recently been produced and recorded), nine cantatas and various liturgical works. Among his music there are also operas and works for ballet, which—with the exception of one opera —have yet to be heard in recent years. Numerous arrangements by him of Scottish songs for the Edinburgh collector George Thomson were popular, and some of these have also been recorded.

Koželuch's substantial output of keyboard compositions reflected the promotion of his reputation as a specialist keyboard virtuoso. By contrast, the musicologist Allan Badley labels Koželuch's symphonic compositions as "modest by the standards of the time".

His works are currently cataloged using Poštolka numbers, after the work of the musicologist Milan Poštolka.

== Symphonies and overtures ==
- P I: 1. Symphony in D major "L'Arlechino"
- P I: 2. Symphony in C major
- P I: 3. Symphony in D major Op. 22 No. 1
- P I: 4. Symphony in F major Op. 22 No. 2
- P I: 5. Symphony in G minor Op. 22 No. 3
- P I: 6. Symphony in C major Op. 24 No. 1
- P I: 7. Symphony in A major Op. 24 No. 2
- P I: 8. Symphony in G major Op. 24 No. 3
- P I: 9. Symphony in C major
- P I:10. Symphony in A major "A la Française"
- P I:11. Symphony in B♭ major "L'irresoluto"
- P I:A1. Symphony in A major
- P I:D1. Symphony in D major (lost)
- P I:D2. Symphony in D major
- P I:D3. Symphony in D major
- P I:E1. Symphony in E major
- P I:F1. Symphony in F major
- P I:G1. Symphony in G major
- P II:1. Sinfonia concertante in E♭ major for mandolin, trumpet in E♭, double bass, piano and orchestra
- P II:2. Sinfonia concertante in C major for piano, flute, oboe, bassoon, cello and orchestra
- P III:1. Overture in G major
- P III:1. Overture Op. 9 in G major
- P III:2. Overture in D major

== Concertos ==
- P IV: 1. Keyboard Concerto Op. 12 in F major
- P IV: 2. Keyboard Concerto Op. 13 in B♭ major
- P IV: 3. Keyboard Concerto Op. 11 in G major
- P IV: 4. Keyboard Concerto Op. 16 in A major
- P IV: 5. Keyboard Concerto Op. 15 in E♭ major
- P IV: 6. Keyboard Concerto in C major
- P IV: 7. Keyboard Concerto Op. 25 in D major
- P IV: 8. Concerto for keyboard 4 hands in B♭ major
- P IV: 9. Harpsichord Concerto in D major
- P IV:10. Harpsichord Concerto in D major
- P IV:11. Rondo Concerto for harpsichord in E♭ major
- P IV:12. Harpsichord Concerto in E major
- P IV:13. Harpsichord Concerto in F major
- P IV:14. Keyboard Concerto in F major
- P IV:15. Keyboard Concerto Op. 36 in C major
- P IV:16. Keyboard Concerto Op. 45 in E♭ major
- P IV:17. Piano Concerto in C major
- P IV:18. Piano Concerto in C major
- P IV:19. Fantasia for piano & orchestra in D minor
- P IV:20. Harpsichord Concerto in E major
- P IV:D1. Harpsichord Concerto in D major
- P IV:D2. Piano Concerto in D major
- P IV:F1. Harpsichord Concerto in F major
- P V: 1. Clarinet Concerto in E♭ major
- P V: 2. Clarinet Concerto in E♭ major
- P V: 3. Sonata for clarinet & orchestra in E♭ major
- P V:B1. Bassoon Concerto in B♭ major
- P V:C1. Bassoon Concerto in C major

== Serenades and parthias ==
- P VI: 1. Serenade Op. 11 No. 1 in D major
- P VI: 2. Serenade Op. 11 No. 2 in E♭ major
- P VI: 3. Parthia in F major
- P VI: 4. Divertimento for wind quintet in D major
- P VI: 5. Divertimento for wind quintet in D major
- P VI: 6. Notturno in D major
- P VI: 7. Divertimento for wind quintet in E♭ major
- P VI: 8. Parthia in F major
- P VI: 9. Divertimento for piano & winds in E♭ major
- P VI:10. Divertimento for piano & winds in E♭ major
- P VI:B1. Parthia a la Camera in B♭ major
- P VI:B2. Parthia a la Camera in B♭ major
- P VI:B3. Parthia a la Camera in B♭ major
- P VI:c1. Parthia a la Camera in C minor
- P VI:d1. Parthia a la Camera in D minor
- P VI:D1. Wind Symphony in D major
- P VI:d2. Parthia a la Camera in D minor
- P VI:Es1. Cassation in E♭ major
- P VI:Es2. Wind quintet in E♭ major
- P VI:Es3. Parthia in E♭ major
- P VI:F1. Parthia in F major (lost)

== Dances and marches ==
- P VII:1. 6 Contredanses
- P VII:2. 12 German Dances
- P VII:3. 15 German Dances
- P VII:4. 15 German Dances
- P VII:5. 12 German Dances
- P VII:6. March for Wiener Freykorps in C major

== String quartets ==
- P VIII:1. String Quartet Op. 32 No. 1 in B♭ major
- P VIII:2. String Quartet Op. 32 No. 2 in G major
- P VIII:3. String Quartet Op. 32 No. 3 in E♭ major
- P VIII:4. String Quartet Op. 33 No. 1 in C major
- P VIII:5. String Quartet Op. 33 No. 2 in A major
- P VIII:6. String Quartet Op. 33 No. 3 in F major

== Keyboard trios ==
- P IX: 1. Piano Trio Op. 3 No. 1 in D major
- P IX: 2. Piano Trio Op. 3 No. 2 in F major
- P IX: 3. Piano Trio Op. 3 No. 3 in E♭ major
- P IX: 4. Piano Trio Op. 6 No. 1 in C major
- P IX: 5. Piano Trio Op. 6 No. 2 in G major
- P IX: 6. Piano Trio Op. 6 No. 3 in B♭ major
- P IX: 7. Piano Trio Op. 21 No. 1 in C major
- P IX: 8. Piano Trio Op. 21 No. 2 in A major
- P IX: 9. Piano Trio Op. 21 No. 3 in E♭ major
- P IX:10. Piano Trio Op. 23 No. 1 in G major
- P IX:11. Piano Trio Op. 23 No. 2 in C minor
- P IX:12. Piano Trio Op. 23 No. 3 in F major
- P IX:13. Piano Trio Op. 27 No. 1 in B♭ major
- P IX:14. Piano Trio Op. 27 No. 2 in A major
- P IX:15. Piano Trio Op. 27 No. 3 in G minor
- P IX:16. Piano Trio Op. 28 No. 1 in E♭ major
- P IX:17. Piano Trio Op. 28 No. 2 in D major
- P IX:18. Piano Trio Op. 28 No. 3 in E minor
- P IX:19. Piano Trio in G major
- P IX:20. Piano Trio in E♭ major
- P IX:21. Piano Trio in C major
- P IX:22. Piano Trio in E♭ major
- P IX:23. Piano Trio in F major
- P IX:24. Piano Trio Op. 34 No. 1 in B♭ major
- P IX:25. Piano Trio Op. 34 No. 2 in G major
- P IX:26. Piano Trio Op. 34 No. 3 in C major
- P IX:27. Piano Trio Op. 36 in C major
- P IX:28. Piano Trio Op. 37 No. 1 in D major
- P IX:29. Piano Trio Op. 37 No. 2 in F major
- P IX:30. Piano Trio Op. 37 No. 3 in G major
- P IX:31. Piano Trio Op. 40 No. 1 in F major
- P IX:32. Piano Trio Op. 40 No. 2 in C major
- P IX:33. Piano Trio Op. 40 No. 3 in E minor
- P IX:34. Piano Trio Op. 41 No. 1 in B♭ major
- P IX:35. Piano Trio Op. 41 No. 2 in D major
- P IX:36. Piano Trio Op. 41 No. 3 in G major
- P IX:37. Piano Trio Op. 44 No. 1 in F major
- P IX:38. Piano Trio Op. 44 No. 2 in G major
- P IX:39. Piano Trio Op. 44 No. 3 in D major
- P IX:40. Piano Trio Op. 46 No. 1 in G major
- P IX:41. Piano Trio Op. 46 No. 2 in B♭ major
- P IX:42. Piano Trio Op. 46 No. 3 in F major
- P IX:43. Piano Trio Op. 47 No. 1 in C major
- P IX:44. Piano Trio Op. 47 No. 2 in A major
- P IX:45. Piano Trio Op. 47 No. 3 in G minor
- P IX:46. Piano Trio Op. 48 No. 1 in E♭ major
- P IX:47. Piano Trio Op. 48 No. 2 in A major
- P IX:48. Piano Trio Op. 48 No. 3 in B♭ major
- P IX:49. Piano Trio Op. 49 No. 1 in D major
- P IX:50. Piano Trio Op. 49 No. 2 in E♭ major
- P IX:51. Piano Trio Op. 49 No. 3 in C major
- P IX:52. Piano Trio Op. 50 No. 1 in B♭ major
- P IX:53. Piano Trio Op. 50 No. 2 in D major
- P IX:54. Piano Trio Op. 50 No. 3 in E♭ major
- P IX:55. Piano Trio Op. 63 No. 1 in B♭ major
- P IX:56. Piano Trio Op. 63 No. 2 in F major
- P IX:57. Piano Trio Op. 63 No. 3 in C major
- P IX:58. Piano Trio Op. 64 No. 1 in D major
- P IX:59. Piano Trio Op. 64 No. 2 in G major
- P IX:60. Piano Trio Op. 64 No. 3 in E♭ major
- P IX:61. Piano Trio Op. 52 No. 1 in D major
- P IX:62. Piano Trio Op. 52 No. 2 in C major
- P IX:63. Piano Trio Op. 52 No. 3 in B♭ major
- P IX:A1. Piano Trio in A major
- P IX:D1. Piano Trio in D major
- P IX:F1. Piano Trio in F major
- P IX:G1. Piano Trio in G major

== Keyboard sonatas ==
The complete sonatas for keyboard instrument by Leopold Koželuh was published in four volumes by Bärenreiter, the editor was Christopher Hogwood.

- P X: 1. Keyboard Sonata with violin in D major
- P X: 2. Keyboard Sonata with violin in F major
- P X: 3. Keyboard Sonata with violin in E♭ major
- P X: 4. Keyboard Sonata with violin Op. 10 No. 1 in E♭ major
- P X: 5. Keyboard Sonata with violin Op. 10 No. 2 in C major
- P X: 6. Keyboard Sonata with violin Op. 17 No. 1 in F minor
- P X: 7. Keyboard Sonata with violin Op. 17 No. 2 in A major
- P X: 8. Keyboard Sonata with violin Op. 17 No. 3 in E♭ major
- P X: 9. Keyboard Sonata with violin in A major
- P X:10. Keyboard Sonata with violin Op. 20 No. 1 in D major (lost)
- P X:11. Keyboard Sonata with violin Op. 20 No. 2 in C major (lost)
- P X:12. Keyboard Sonata with violin Op. 20 No. 3 in G major (lost)
- P X:13. Keyboard Sonata with violin Op. 18 No. 1 in G minor
- P X:14. Keyboard Sonata with violin Op. 18 No. 2 in C major
- P X:15. Keyboard Sonata with violin Op. 18 No. 3 in A♭ major
- P X:16. Keyboard Sonata with violin Op. 16 No. 1 in G major
- P X:17. Keyboard Sonata with violin Op. 16 No. 2 in C minor
- P X:18. Keyboard Sonata with violin Op. 16 No. 3 in F major
- P X:19. Keyboard Sonata with violin Op. 23 No. 1 in E major
- P X:20. Keyboard Sonata with violin Op. 23 No. 2 in G major
- P X:21. Keyboard Sonata with violin Op. 23 No. 3 in D major
- P X:22. Keyboard Sonata with violin Op. 23 No. 4 in B♭ major
- P X:23. Keyboard Sonata with violin Op. 23 No. 5 in F minor
- P X:24. Keyboard Sonata with violin Op. 23 No. 6 in G major
- P XI:1. Sonata for keyboard 4 hands Op. 4 in F major
- P XI:2. Sonata for keyboard 4 hands Op. 8 No. 3 in B♭ major
- P XI:3. Sonata for keyboard 4 hands Op. 19 in F major
- P XI:4. Sonata for keyboard 4 hands Op. 29 in B♭ major
- P XI:5. Sonata for keyboard 4 hands Op. 12 No. 1 in C major
- P XI:6. Sonata for keyboard 4 hands Op. 12 No. 2 in F major
- P XI:7. Sonata for keyboard 4 hands Op. 12 No. 3 in D major
- P XII: 1. Harpsichord Sonata in F major
- P XII: 2. Keyboard Sonata in A major
- P XII: 3. Keyboard Sonata Op. 13 No. 1 in E♭ major
- P XII: 4. Keyboard Sonata in F major
- P XII: 5. Keyboard Sonata in C major
- P XII: 6. Keyboard Sonata Op. 13 No. 3 in E minor
- P XII: 7. Keyboard Sonata Op. 13 No. 2 in G major
- P XII: 8. Keyboard Sonata Op. 1 No. 1 in F major
- P XII: 9. Keyboard Sonata Op. 1 No. 2 in E♭ major
- P XII:10. Keyboard Sonata Op. 1 No. 3 in D major
- P XII:11. Keyboard Sonata Op. 2 No. 1 in B♭ major
- P XII:12. Keyboard Sonata Op. 2 No. 2 in A major
- P XII:13. Keyboard Sonata Op. 2 No. 3 in C minor
- P XII:14. Keyboard Sonata in D major
- P XII:15. Keyboard Sonata Op. 8 No. 1 in E♭ major
- P XII:16. Keyboard Sonata Op. 8 No. 2 in C major
- P XII:17. Keyboard Sonata Op. 15 No. 1 in G minor
- P XII:18. Keyboard Sonata Op. 15 No. 2 in C major
- P XII:19. Keyboard Sonata Op. 15 No. 3 in A♭ major
- P XII:20. Keyboard Sonata Op. 17 No. 1 in F minor
- P XII:21. Keyboard Sonata Op. 17 No. 2 in A major
- P XII:22. Keyboard Sonata Op. 17 No. 3 in E♭ major
- P XII:23. Keyboard Sonata Op. 20 No. 1 in F major
- P XII:24. Keyboard Sonata Op. 20 No. 2 in C major
- P XII:25. Keyboard Sonata Op. 20 No. 3 in D minor
- P XII:26. Keyboard Sonata Op. 26 No. 1 in D major
- P XII:27. Keyboard Sonata Op. 26 No. 2 in A minor
- P XII:28. Keyboard Sonata Op. 26 No. 3 in E♭ major
- P XII:29. Keyboard Sonata Op. 30 No. 1 in B♭ major
- P XII:30. Keyboard Sonata Op. 30 No. 2 in G major
- P XII:31. Keyboard Sonata Op. 30 No. 3 in C minor
- P XII:32. Keyboard Sonata Op. 35 No. 1 in F major
- P XII:33. Keyboard Sonata Op. 35 No. 2 in A major
- P XII:34. Keyboard Sonata Op. 35 No. 3 in G minor
- P XII:35. Keyboard Sonata Op. 38 No. 1 in E♭ major
- P XII:36. Keyboard Sonata Op. 38 No. 2 in C major
- P XII:37. Keyboard Sonata Op. 38 No. 3 in F minor
- P XII:38. Piano Sonata Op. 51 No. 1 in E♭ major
- P XII:39. Piano Sonata Op. 51 No. 2 in C minor
- P XII:40. Piano Sonata Op. 51 No. 3 in D minor
- P XII:41. Harpsichord Sonata in C major
- P XII:42. Harpsichord Sonata in E♭ major
- P XII:43. Piano Sonata in B♭ major (lost)
- P XII:44. Piano Sonata in A major (lost)
- P XII:45. Piano Sonata in E minor (lost)
- P XII:46. Keyboard Sonata Op. 53 No. 1 in G major
- P XII:47. Keyboard Sonata Op. 53 No. 2 in F major
- P XII:48. Keyboard Sonata Op. 53 No. 3 in E♭ major
- P XII:49. Piano Sonata in G major (lost)
- P XII:50. Piano Sonata in G major
- P XII:C1. Harpsichord Sonata in C major
- P XII:D1. Harpsichord Sonata in D major
- P XII:Es1. Harpsichord Sonata in E♭ major
- P XII:Es2. Harpsichord Sonata in E♭ major
- P XII:G1. Harpsichord Sonata in G major
- P XII:G2. Harpsichord Sonata in G major

== Keyboard pieces ==
- P XIII: 1. Andante & March for harpsichord
- P XIII: 2. La Chasse for keyboard Op. 5 in B♭ major
- P XIII: 3. Caprice for piano Op. 45 No. 1 in E♭ major
- P XIII: 4. Caprice for piano Op. 45 No. 2 in B♭ major
- P XIII: 5. Caprice for piano Op. 45 No. 3 in C minor
- P XIII: 6. Piece for piano Op. 43 No. 1 in A minor
- P XIII: 7. Piece for piano Op. 43 No. 2 in C major
- P XIII: 8. Piece for piano Op. 43 No. 3 in C major
- P XIII: 9. Piece for piano Op. 43 No. 4 in C major
- P XIII:10. Piece for piano Op. 43 No. 5 in F major
- P XIII:11. Piece for piano Op. 43 No. 6 in G major
- P XIII:12. Piece for piano Op. 43 No. 7 in G major
- P XIII:13. Piece for piano Op. 43 No. 8 in C major
- P XIII:14. Piece for piano Op. 43 No. 9 in A minor
- P XIII:15. Piece for piano Op. 43 No. 10 in B minor
- P XIII:16. Piece for piano Op. 43 No. 11 in D minor
- P XIII:17. Piece for piano Op. 43 No. 12 in E♭ major
- P XIII:a1. Sicilienne for keyboard in A minor
- P XIII:C1. Bernoise for keyboard in C major
- P XIII:F1. La chasse au sanglier for keyboard in F major (is Rondo Allegretto of Sonata Op. 53 No. 2)
- P XIII:g1. Pastorale for keyboard in G minor
- P XIII:G1. Romance for keyboard in G major
- P XIII:G2. Air cosaque for keyboard in G major
- P XIV: 1. 13 Menuets for harpsichord
- P XIV: 2. Menuetto angloise for harpsichord in F major
- P XIV: 3. Polonese for harpsichord in C major
- P XIV: 4. 9 Menuets for harpsichord
- P XIV: 5. 6 Contredanses for keyboard
- P XIV: 6. Wachtel Menuett for keyboard in F♯ minor
- P XIV: 7. 12 Menuets for keyboard
- P XIV: 8. 15 German Dances for keyboard
- P XIV: 9. 15 German Dances & 6 Ecossaises for piano
- P XIV:10. Marsch für das Corps der Freywilligen des Handelstandes von Wien in C major
- P XIV:11. 12 German Dances for piano
- P XIV:C1. 12 Ländler for keyboard in C major
- P XIV:D1. 10 German Dances & 12 Ländler for piano
- P XIV:Es1. 10 Ländler & Coda for piano in E♭ major
- P XIV:F1. 7 Polonaises for piano

== Other chamber music ==
- P XV:1. Violin Duet in D major
- P XV:2. Violin Duet in B♭ major
- P XV:3. Violin Duet in G major
- P XV:4. Trio for flute, violin & cello in G major
- P XV:5. Hunting Fanfare for 3 horns in C major
- P XV:6. Duet for violin & viola in D major
- P XV:7. Duet for flute & cello in E minor
- P XV:8. Duet for flute & cello in C major
- P XV:9. Duet for flute & cello in D major

== Oratorios ==
- P XVI:1. Moisè in Egitto
- P XVI:2. La Giuditta (lost)

== Choral pieces and part-songs ==
- P XVII:1. Chorus for La Galatea P XIX:7 in C major
- P XVIII:1. Notturno Op. 42 No. 1 in C minor
- P XVIII:2. Notturno Op. 42 No. 2 in G minor
- P XVIII:3. Notturno Op. 42 No. 3 in B♭ major
- P XVIII:4. Notturno Op. 42 No. 4 in D minor
- P XVIII:5. Notturno Op. 42 No. 5 in E♭ major
- P XVIII:6. Notturno Op. 42 No. 6 in C major
- P XVIII:B1. Quartet: Dum ti dum in B♭ major

== Secular cantatas and arias ==
- P XIX:1. Denis Klage auf den Todt Marien Theresien
- P XIX:2. Cantata: Quanto è mai tormentosa
- P XIX:3. Cantata Op. 11: Joseph, der Menschheit Segen
- P XIX:4. Cantata to Maria Theresia Paradis
- P XIX:5. Cantata Op. 8: Chloe, siehst du nicht voll grausen
- P XIX:6. Cantata for the Coronation of Leopold II
- P XIX:7. La Galatea (lost)
- P XIX:8. In un fiero contrasto
- P XIX:9. Cantata pastorale per la Natività di Nostro Signor Gesù Christo (lost)
- P XX:1. Caro bene in E♭ major
- P XX:2. Misero me! che veggo in E♭ major
- P XX:3. Se mai senti in G major

== Songs ==
- P XXI: 1. 15 Lieder
- P XXI: 2. 12 Lieder
- P XXI: 3. The happy Pair in A♭ major
- P XXI: 4. 12 Ariette Op. 31
- P XXI: 5. De l'arbre ces fruits in G major
- P XXI: 6. Marschlied für das Wiener Freycorps in C major
- P XXI: 7. Marschlied für das akademische Bürgercorps in B♭ major
- P XXI: 8. 3 Airs François
- P XXI: 9. Hört! Maurer, auf der Weisheit lehren in A major
- P XXI:10. In questa tomba oscura in C minor
- P XXI:11. 12 Canzonette
- P XXI:12. Mein Mädchen in D major
- P XXI:13. Des Kriegers Abschied in C major
- P XXI:14. Leiser nannt' ich deinen Namen in C minor
- P XXI:15. Let the declining damask rose in G major
- P XXI:C1. Aufruf an die Böhmen in C major
- P XXI:C2. 27 Solfeggi
- P XXII:1. Scottish, Irish & Welsh Songs
- P XXII:2. Welsh Songs
- P XXII:A1. Scottish Melodies arranged for keyboard

== Operas ==
- P XXIII:1. Le Muzet (lost)
- P XXIII:2. Debora e Sisara (lost)
- P XXIII:3. Didone abbandonata (lost)
- P XXIII:4. Télémaque dans l'île de Calypso (opera) (lost)
- P XXIII:5. Judith und Holofernes (lost)
- P XXIII:6. Gustav Vasa

== Ballets ==
- P XXIV:1. Ballet Op. 39: La ritrovata figlia di Ottone II
- P XXIV:2. Arlechino (lost)
- P XXIV:3. Ballet in C major
- P XXIV:4. Ballet in F major
- P XXIV:5. Pantomime in A minor
- P XXIV:6. Télémaque dans l'île de Calypso (ballet) (lost)

== Sacred music ==
- P XXV: 1. Mass in C major
- P XXV: 2. Tantum ergo in F major
- P XXV: 3. Mandavit Deus in E♭ major
- P XXV: 4. Quaeso ad me veni in E♭ major
- P XXV: 5. Umbra noctis orbem tangit in B♭ major
- P XXV: 6. Domine non sul dignus in E♭ major
- P XXV: 7. Gottes Liebe in C♯ minor
- P XXV:A1. Mass in A major
- P XXV:A2. Offertory in A major
- P XXV:A3. Aeh quanta vis amoris in A major
- P XXV:A4. Mater dolorosa in A major
- P XXV:B1. Ad hoc festum chori in B♭ major
- P XXV:B2. Omni die Mariae in B♭ major
- P XXV:B3. Magne Deus audi in B♭ major
- P XXV:C1. Missa brevis in C major
- P XXV:D1. Missa brevis in D major
- P XXV:D2. Amati quaeso montes in D major
- P XXV:Es1. Cernis o anima in E♭ major
- P XXV:g1. Mass in G minor
