= Le diable à quatre =

Le diable à quatre (The devil to pay) may refer to:

- Le diable à quatre (ballet), an 1845 ballet by the choreographer Joseph Mazilier and the composer Adolphe Adam
- Le diable à quatre (opera), a 1759 opera by Christoph Willibald Gluck
- Le diable à quatre, a 1937 opera by Jean Françaix
- Le diable à quatre, ou La Femme acariâtre, an 1809 opera by Jean-Pierre Solié
- Le diable à quatre, a 1987 Canadian film starring Lucie Laurier
