= André Bloch (composer) =

French composer and music educator (1873–1960)

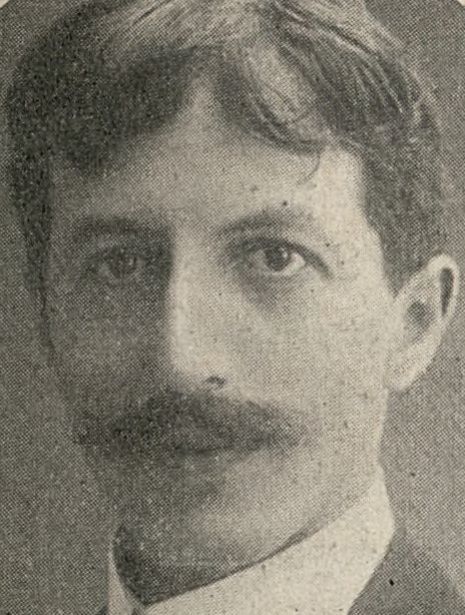
From a 1909 publication

André Bloch (14 January 1873 – 7 August 1960) was a French composer and music educator.

== Biography ==
André Bloch was born on 14 January 1873, in Wissembourg, now in Alsace, at the time part of the German Empire. He was Jewish, and the son of a rabbi. Bloch studied with André Gedalge, Ernest Guiraud, and Jules Massenet at the Conservatoire de Paris.

In 1893, he won the Prix de Rome for his cantata Antigone which used a text by Ferdinand Beissier. The prize enabled him to pursue further studies at the French Academy in Rome. In 1898, he joined the faculty of the Conservatoire de Paris as a professor of harmony. One of his notable pupils at that school was Jehan Alain. He later taught at American Conservatory in Fontainebleau. His private students included the composer Fernand Oubradous.

Bloch was known primarily as an opera composer. His first opera, Maïda, premiered in 1909, and his last opera, Guignol, was created in 1939 and premiered in 1949 at the Opéra-Comique in Paris. He also composed symphonic works, ballets, chamber music, piano works, and chansons.

He died on 7 August 1960, in Viry-Chatillon in Île-de-France, France.
