= Clarinet Concerto No. 1 =

Clarinet Concerto No. 1 may refer to:

- Clarinet Concerto No. 1 (Spohr)
- Clarinet Concerto No. 1 (Weber)

== See also ==
- Clarinet Concerto (disambiguation)
- Clarinet Concerto No. 2 (disambiguation)
