= Chu Yibing =

Chinese cellist

Chu Yibing (Chinese: 朱亦兵; born 1966) is a Chinese cellist. He contributed to spreading ensemble music all over China. His ensemble China Philharmonic Cellists, made up of 12 Chinese cellists, gives concerts all over the country.

== Biography ==
He was imparted rudimentary knowledge of music by his parents, both of whom were professors in the Central Conservatory of Music in Beijing, when he was a child. His mother is half-Swiss half-Chinese. Chu's father was an excellent cellist and a strict teacher, so Chu laid a solid foundation before he studied abroad in Europe.

He went to Europe to pursue music studies in 1983. In France, he studied with Maurice Gendron. In 1986, he was awarded several prizes in an international cello competition in Geneva, which made him the first Chinese cellist that had won an international competition. Chu graduated from the Conservatoire de Paris in 1987 with Premier Prix, becoming the third Chinese musician (after Ma Sicong and Xian Xinghai) who ever got a degree with merit from the Conservatoire de Paris. Then, Chu began to study on 20th-century music, working with Inter Contemporain and Pierre Boulez.

Chu became the principal cellist of Sinfonieorchester Basel, Switzerland, in 1989. In 1999, he was the guest principal cellist of Symphonieorchester des Bayerischen Rundfunks. Chu was invited by his German cellist friends as one of the 6 members of the Cologne Philharmonic Cellists and gave many performances all over Germany. A large amount of traditional works have been revised by this group into cello ensemble works, with modern perspectives and popular styles. Besides, as an outstanding cellist, Chu had opportunities to play with other great cellists such as Rostropovich, Greenhouse, etc.

Chu Yibing

For knowing music from a new approach, he decided to study conducting at the Basel Music Academy. Then, he began to conduct symphony orchestras in Switzerland. Chu has conducted the Hallé, Britain's longest-established symphony orchestra, Munich Symphony Orchestra, Düsseldorf Symphony Orchestra and Berlin Symphony Orchestra.

In 2004, after 21 years studying and playing in Europe, Chu came back to China and was appointed as Professor of Cello at the Central Conservatory of Music. After that, he and his followers began to spread music as well as ideas of music education over China by giving concerts in various forms and propagating western music studies.

Chu founded the China Philharmonic Cellists, a group that tours around the country. His efforts have been well-recognized and highly appraised by mainstream media in China.
