= Gnarly Buttons =

1996 composition for solo clarinet and chamber ensemble by John Adams

Gnarly Buttons is a composition for solo clarinet and chamber ensemble by the American composer John Adams. The London Sinfonietta and Present Music (Milwaukee, Wisconsin) co-commissioned the work. The work received its premiere at the Queen Elizabeth Hall in London on October 19, 1996, with the London Sinfonietta, Michael Collins as solo clarinetist and the composer conducting. The work received its first Proms performance on 23 July 1998, conducted by Markus Stenz. The New York City premiere was in October 1997, with David Shifrin as the clarinet soloist and Ransom Wilson conducting musicians of the Chamber Music Society of Lincoln Center.

Gnarly Buttons is composed of three movements, with the following titles:

1. The Perilous Shore
2. Hoedown (Mad Cow)
3. Put Your Loving Arms Around Me

In addition to the solo clarinet, the work is scored for thirteen musicians, including a banjo player (who doubles on mandolin and guitar), a cor anglais, a bassoon, a trombone, piano, two sampling keyboards (loaded with samples that include accordion, clarinet, and cow), and strings. Adams has said “The three movements are each based on a 'forgery' or imagined musical model.” He has also stated that Gnarly Buttons was influenced in part by his father's passing due to Alzheimer's disease.

Adams has provided a short explanation for the title, claiming that it was a reference to the "gnarly buttons" on many trees, as well as the keys on a clarinet.

== Sources ==
- May, Thomas. The John Adams Reader (ISBN 1-57467-132-4)
- Taylor, Anthony G. "John Adams's 'Gnarly Buttons': Issues of History, Performance and Style." Doctoral document, University of Cincinnati, 2007. Electronic library access at: https://www.ohiolink.edu/etd/view.cgi?ucin1185548983
