= Clarinet Concerto No. 2 (Arnold) =

Composition by Malcolm Arnold

Clarinet Concerto No. 2 was the second clarinet concerto written by English composer Malcolm Arnold, his Opus 115. It was commissioned in 1974 by clarinetist Benny Goodman, who had given the American premiere of Arnold's Clarinet Concerto No. 1 in 1967.

In the late 1960s, Goodman telephoned Arnold to commission the concerto; however, Arnold, believing the call to be a prank, yelled "Sod off!" and hung up on him. After this confusion was resolved, Arnold agreed to compose the piece. Upon its completion in April 1974, Goodman travelled to Dublin to collect the score. Arnold left it in his hotel room with flowers and a bottle of Jack Daniel's whiskey. Several hours later he received a call from Goodman, who noted: "I may be a bit stoned but I think your concerto is just great!"

The concerto is tailored to Goodman's jazz background: the first movement, "Allegro vivace", includes a cadenza marked "as jazzy and way out as you please". "Lento", the second movement, is more lyrical, although Paul Serotsky suggests that "this might have 'graced' some horror film". The final movement, "Allegro non troppo", is also known as the "Pre-Goodman Rag", and is characterized by ragtime rhythms.

The concerto was premiered at the Red Rocks Music Festival with Goodman and the Denver Symphony Orchestra. When it was first composed, few classical clarinetists were willing to attempt a performance because of the "outrageous" quality of the final movement. Jack Brymer was among the first, other than Goodman, to perform the work publicly, but did not record it. There have since been several recordings made by various musicians.

== Instrumentation ==
The piece is scored for solo clarinet, piccolo, two oboes, two bassoons, two horns, timpani, trap set, and strings.
