= Clarinet Concerto (Eybler) =

1798 composition by Joseph Leopold Eybler

Joseph Leopold Eybler composed the Clarinet Concerto in B♭ major in 1798, probably for Mozart's clarinetist Anton Stadler. It is catalogued by Herrmann as HV 160.

The concerto for clarinet and orchestra is in three movements:

1. Allegro maestoso
2. Adagio
3. Rondo alla turca: Allegro

== Discography ==
Eduard Brunner and Bamberg Symphony recorded it for the Tudor label in 1993.

Along with clarinet concertos by Franz Xaver Süssmayr and Mozart (Clarinet Concerto), it was recorded on the Novalis label by Dieter Klöcker and the English Chamber Orchestra in 1994.

It was also recorded in 2000 on the Cavalli Records label by Peter Rabl and Concilium Musicum Vienna (on period instruments) conducted by Paul Angerer, along with a serenade of Michael Haydn and a symphony of Ignaz Pleyel.
