= Donato Lovreglio =

Italian flautist and composer

Donato Lovreglio (6 December 1841, in Bari – May 1907, in Naples) was an Italian flautist and composer, mainly of music for his own instrument and other woodwinds. He was a native of Bari, and later moved to Naples, where he died. Among his compositions are numerous concert fantasies and arrangements of themes from a number of Giuseppe Verdi's operas, including Simon Boccanegra, Don Carlos, and La traviata.
