= Joseph Leopold Eybler =

Austrian composer

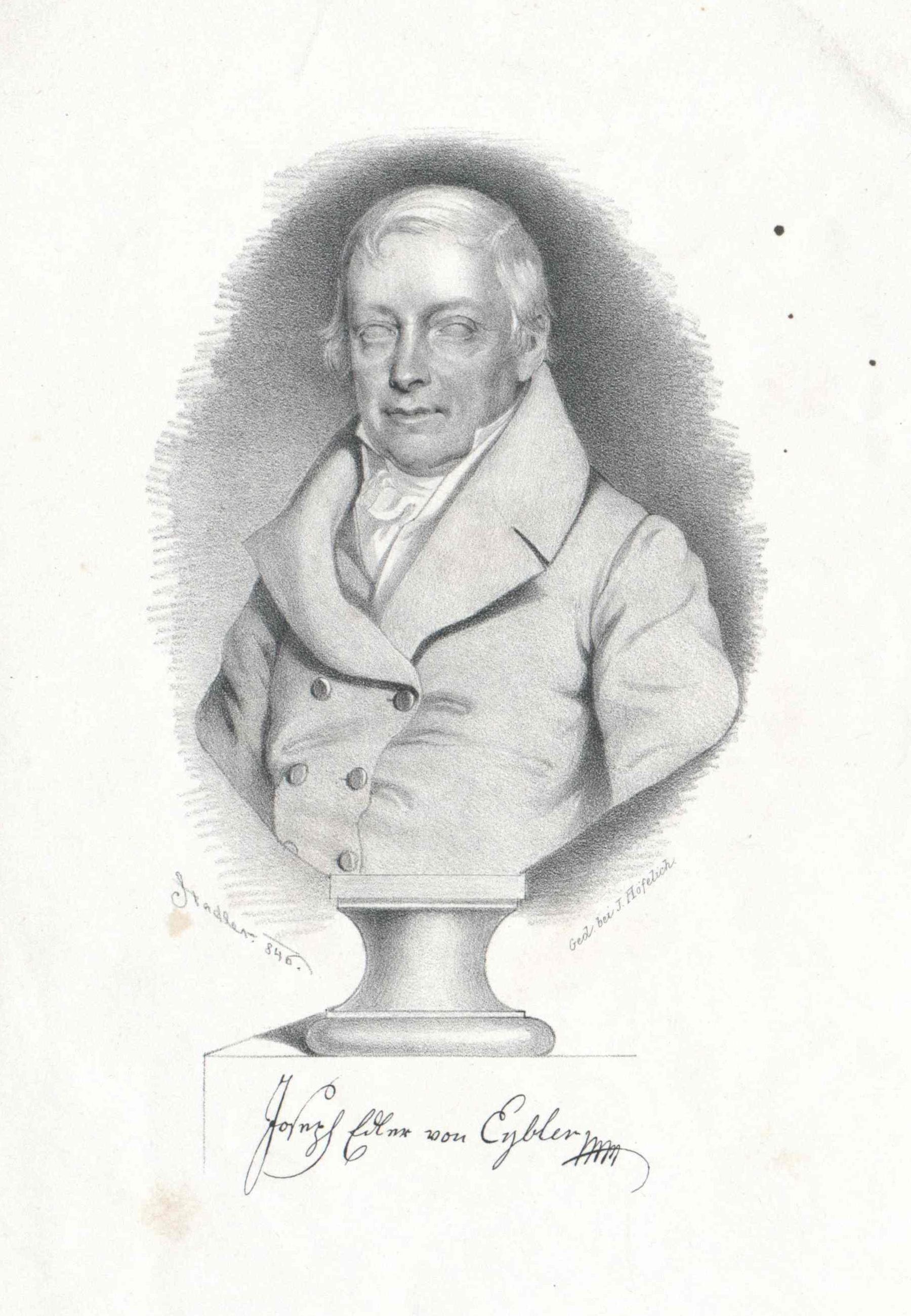
Joseph Edler von Eybler, 1846

Joseph Leopold Eybler (8 February 1765 – 24 July 1846) was an Austrian composer and contemporary of Wolfgang Amadeus Mozart.

== Life ==
Eybler was born into a musical family in Schwechat near Vienna. His father was a teacher, choir director and friend of the Haydn family. Joseph Eybler studied music with his father before attending Stephansdom (the cathedral school of St. Stephen's Boys College) in Vienna. He studied composition under Johann Georg Albrechtsberger, who declared him to be the greatest musical genius in Vienna apart from Mozart. He also received praise from Haydn who was his friend, distant cousin and patron.

In 1792 he became choir director at the Karmeliterkirche (Carmelite Church) in Vienna. Two years later he moved to the Schottenkloster, where he remained for the next thirty years (1794–1824). Eybler also held court posts, including that of court Kapellmeister (chapel master) (1824–33). The Empress Marie Therese commissioned many works from him, including the Requiem in C minor (1803).

== Friendship with Mozart ==
Through Joseph Haydn, Eybler met Mozart, who gave him some lessons and entrusted him with the rehearsal of his opera Così fan tutte. Eybler also conducted some performances of Così fan tutte.

On May 30, 1790, Mozart wrote a testimonial for the young Eybler: "I, the undersigned, attest herewith that I have found the bearer of this, Herr Joseph Eybler, to be a worthy pupil of his famous master Albrechtsberger, a well-grounded composer, equally skilled at chamber music and the church style, fully experienced in the art of the song, also an accomplished organ and clavier player; in short a young musician such, one can only regret, as so seldom has his equal."

Mozart and Eybler remained friends to the end. As Eybler wrote: "I had the good fortune to keep his friendship without reservation until he died, and carried him, put him to bed and helped to nurse him during his last painful illness."

After Mozart's death, Constanze Mozart asked Eybler to complete her husband's Requiem. Eybler tried but could not complete the commission perhaps, it is thought, because of his great respect for the music of his friend Mozart. (Franz Xaver Süßmayr completed the task).

== Last years ==
In 1833 Eybler had a stroke while conducting Mozart's Requiem and thereafter could not fulfill his duties at the Court. For his service to the Court, Eybler was raised to the nobility in 1835 and was known henceforth as Joseph Leopold, Edler von Eybler. He died in Vienna on 24 July 1846.

== Works ==
Eybler's main compositions were sacred music, including oratorios, masses, cantatas, offertories, graduals, and his requiem. His other works include an opera, instrumental music (especially his string quintets), and songs.

Of special note may be the Clarinet Concerto (HV160) he wrote most probably for "Mozart's" clarinetist Anton Stadler. A recording of this concerto by Dieter Klöcker is available on the Novalis music label.

=== Works list ===
- HV 1. Missa Sancti Hermani in C major
- HV 2. Missa Sancti Michaelis in C major
- HV 3. Missa Sancti Ludovici in C major
- HV 4. Missa Sancti Mauritii in C major
- HV 5. Missa Coronationis Ferdinandi V Regis Hungariae in C major
- HV 6. Missa Sancti Alberti in C major
- HV 7. Missa in C major
- HV 8. Missa Sancti Bennonis in C minor
- HV 9. Missa Sancti Caroli in C minor
- HV 10. Missa Sancti Joannis in C minor
- HV 11. Missa Sancti Wolfgangi in D minor
- HV 12. Missa Sancti Leopoldi in D minor
- HV 13. Missa Sancti Ignatii in E♭ major
- HV 14. Missa Sanctae Andreae in E♭ major
- HV 15. Missa Sanctorum Apostolorum in E♭ major
- HV 16. Missa Sancti Clementis in E major
- HV 17. Missa Sancti Josephi in F major
- HV 18. Missa Sancti Maximiliani in F major
- HV 19. Missa Sancti Rudolphi in F major
- HV 20. Missa Sancti Raineri in F major
- HV 21. Missa Sancti Sigismundi in F major
- HV 22. Missa Sanctae Eleonorae in G major
- HV 23. Missa Sancti Georgii in G major
- HV 24. Missa Sanctae Sophiae in G major
- HV 25. Missa pro Sabbato Sancto in G major
- HV 26. Missa Sancti Ferdinandi in G minor
- HV 27. Missa Sancti Thaddaei in A♭ major
- HV 28. Missa Sanctae Elisabethae in A minor
- HV 29. Missa Sanctae Theresiae in B♭ major
- HV 30. Missa Sancti Francisci in B♭ major
- HV 31. Missa Sancti Theodori in B♭ major
- HV 32. Missa Sancti Antonii in B♭ major
- HV 33. Missa Sanctae Annae in B♭ major
- HV 34. Gloria & Incarnatus for Michael Haydn's Missa in D minor
- HV 35. Kyrie ad Missam in Coena Domini in E minor
- HV 36. Sanctus in C major
- HV 37. Requiem in C minor
- HV 38. Graduale: Quem tuus amor ebriat in C major
- HV 39. Graduale: Cantate Domino in C major
- HV 40. Graduale: Omnes de Saba venient in C major
- HV 41. Graduale: Sperate in Deo omnis in C major
- HV 42. Graduale: Domine Deus omnium creator in C major
- HV 43. Graduale: Unam petii in C major
- HV 44. Graduale: Per te Dei Genitrix in C major
- HV 45. Graduale: Lauda Sion salvatorem in C major
- HV 46. Graduale: Os justi meditabitur sapientiam in C minor
- HV 47. Graduale: Nocte surgentes vigilemus omnes in D major
- HV 48. Graduale: Ecce sacerdos magnus in D major
- HV 49. Graduale: Te summe Jesu fontem amoris in D major
- HV 50. Graduale: Tua est potentia in E♭ major
- HV 51. Graduale: Omni die dic Mariae laudes in E♭ major
- HV 52. Graduale: Pater noster in E♭ major
- HV 53. Graduale: Specie tua in F major
- HV 54. Graduale: Christus factus est pro nobis in F major
- HV 55. Graduale: Benedicam Dominum in omni tempore in F major
- HV 56. Graduale: Non in multitudine est virtus tua Domine in F major
- HV 57. Graduale: Alma redemptoris Mater in G major
- HV 58. Graduale: Victimae paschali laudes in G major
- HV 59. Graduale: Beata gens cuius est Deus in G major
- HV 60. Graduale: Peccata dimittis in G major
- HV 61. Graduale: Dies sanctificatus illuxit nobis in G major
- HV 62. Graduale: Dominus in Sina in sancto in G major
- HV 63. Graduale: Tu Domine Pater noster in G major
- HV 64. Graduale: Benedictus es in A♭ major
- HV 65. Graduale: Ave Maria gratia plena in A major
- HV 66. Graduale: Cantate Domino in A major
- HV 67. Graduale: Magnificate Dominum mecum in B♭ major
- HV 68. Graduale: Exaltate Dominum Deum in B♭ major
- HV 69. Graduale: Iste est qui ante Deum in B♭ major
- HV 70. Graduale: Justus ut palma florebit in B♭ major
- HV 71. Graduale: Bone Deus amor Deus in B♭ major
- HV 72. Graduale: Populum humilem salvum in B♭ major
- HV 73. Graduale: Alleluia confitemini Domino in B♭ major
- HV 74. Graduale: Reges Tharsis et Saba in D major (doubtful)
- HV 75. Graduale: Domine cor mundum (doubtful, maybe composed by Oehlinger)
- HV 76. Offertory: Nos populus tuus in C major
- HV 77. Offertory: Jubilate Deo in C major
- HV 78. Offertory: Tui sunt coeli et tua est terra in C major
- HV 79. Offertory: Confirma hoc Deus in C major
- HV 80. Offertory: Ascendit Deus in C major
- HV 81. Offertory: Tres sunt qui testimonium in C major
- HV 82. Offertory: Audite vocem magnam dicentem in C major
- HV 83. Offertory: Surrexit vere tumulo in C major
- HV 84. Offertory in C major (text missing)
- HV 85. Offertory: Terra tremuit et quievit in C minor
- HV 86. Offertory: Si consistent adversum me castra in C minor
- HV 87. Offertory: Timebunt gentes nomen tuum Domine in C minor
- HV 88. Offertory: Domine si observaveris iniquitates in C minor
- HV 88. Offertory: Haec est dies qua candida in D major
- HV 90. Offertory: Summe Deus te semper laudum in D major
- HV 91. Offertory: Jubilate Deo omnis terra in D major
- HV 92. Offertory: Fremit mare cum furore in D minor
- HV 92. Offertory: Laus sit Deo in excelsis in D major
- HV 94. Offertory: Tremit mare in D minor
- HV 95. Offertory: Lux est orta in E♭ major
- HV 96. Offertory: Ad te o summa bonitas in E♭ major
- HV 97. Offertory: Levavi oculos meos in E major
- HV 98. Offertory: Ad te levavi animam meam in F major
- HV 99. Offertory: Confitebor Domino in F major
- HV 100. Offertory: O Maria virgo pia in G major
- HV 101. Offertory: Domine Deus salutis meae in G major
- HV 102. Offertory: Lauda Sion salvatorem in G major (incorrectly attributed to Eybler; correctly: Michael Haydns Offertory Lauda Sion, MH 215)
- HV 103. Offertory: Tecum principium in die virtutis tuae in G major
- HV 104. Offertory: Levavi in montes oculos meos in G minor
- HV 105. Offertory: Confitebor tibi Domine in A major
- HV 106. Offertory: Laudate pueri Dominum in B♭ major
- HV 107. Offertory: Reges Tharsis et insulae munera in B♭ major
- HV 108. Offertory: Magna et mirabilia sunt opera in B♭ major
- HV 109. Offertory: Emitte spiritum tuum in B♭ major
- HV 110. Antiphon: Regina coeli laetare in C major
- HV 111. Antiphon: Regina coeli laetare in D major
- HV 112. Antiphon: Salve Regina in F major
- HV 113. Antiphon: Salve Regina in G major
- HV 114. Te Deum in C major (1807)
- HV 115. Te Deum in C major (1814)
- HV 116. Te Deum in C major (1824)
- HV 117. Te Deum in C major
- HV 118. Te Deum in D major (1800)
- HV 119. Te Deum in D major (1819)
- HV 120. Te Deum in B♭ major
- HV 121. Hymn: Veni sancte spiritus in C major
- HV 122. Hymn: Alleluia in C major
- HV 123. Hymn: Tristes erant apostoli in C minor
- HV 124. Hymn: Iste confessor in D minor
- HV 125. Hymn: Ecce quo modo moritur justus in F major
- HV 126. Hymn: Coelestis urbs Jerusalem in F major
- HV 127. Hymn: Exultet orbis gaudiis in F major
- HV 128. Hymn: Tantum ergo in F major
- HV 129. Hymn: Veni sancte spiritus in G major
- HV 130. Hymn: Jesu nostra redemptio in G major
- HV 131. Hymn: Asperges me Domine
- HV 132. De profundis clamavi in G minor
- HV 133. Laudate Dominum in A minor
- HV 134. Miserere in D minor
- HV 135. Litaniae in F major
- HV 136. Tibi aeterno Deo haec cantica in G major
- HV 137. Die vier letzten Dinge
- HV 138. Die Hirten bei der krippe zu Bethlehem
- HV 139. Dich Schöpfer sanfter Harmonie
- HV 140. Il sacrifizio
- HV 141. Die Macht der Tonkunst
- HV 142. Der Zauberschwert
- HV 143. Overture to Der Zauberschwert for piano in B♭ major
- HV 144. Lied: Ein Weibchen das den ganzen Tag in C major
- HV 145. Lied: Es liebt sich so traulich in E♭ major
- HV 146. Lied: Ich bin in den Blühmond der Rosen in F major
- HV 147. Lied: Von Millionen eine allein in G minor
- HV 148. Lied: Ich will nichts von Liebe wissen in G major
- HV 149. Lied: Sogleich empfand ich beym Erblicken in B♭ major
- HV 150. Lied: Von der treue Arm umwunden in E minor
- HV 151. Scena ed aria for Coriolan
- HV 152. Scena ed quartetto for Coriolan
- HV 153. Vanne torna altro...Combattero da forte in D major
- HV 154. Dov'è la sposa mia...Svenami pur in E♭ major
- HV 155. Sposa d'Emireno tu sei...L'ombra incerta in E♭ major
- HV 156. Die Familie des T.C. Gracchus
- HV 157. Ouverture in C minor, Op. 8
- HV 158. Symphony in C major
- HV 159. Symphony in D major
- HV 160. Clarinet Concerto in B♭ major
- HV 161. Divertimento für die Faschingsdienstag in D major
- HV 162. 12 Minuets with trios for orchestra
- HV 163. 12 Minuets with trios for orchestra
- HV 164. 12 Minuets for orchestra
- HV 165. 12 Minuets with trios for orchestra
- HV 166. 12 Minuets with trios for orchestra
- HV 167. 12 Minuets for orchestra
- HV 168. 8 Minuets with trios for orchestra
- HV 169. 8 Minuets with trios for orchestra
- HV 170. 7 Minuets with trios for orchestra
- HV 171. 5 Minuets with trios for orchestra (2 are lost)
- HV 172. 13 German Dances for orchestra
- HV 173. 12 German Dances for orchestra
- HV 174. 12 German Dances with trios for orchestra (lost)
- HV 175. 12 German Dances for orchestra (lost)
- HV 176. 8 German Dances with trios for orchestra
- HV 177. Contredanze con 6 alternativi for orchestra
- HV 178. 3 Contredances for orchestra
- HV 179. Eccossè con 6 alternativi for orchestra
- HV 180. Dances for orchestra
- HV 181. Polonaise for orchestra in C major
- HV 182. String Sextet in D major
- HV 183. String Quintet Op. 5 in E♭ major
- HV 184. Viola d'amore Quintet in D major
- HV 185. Viola d'amore Quintet in D major
- HV 186. String Quintet in D major
- HV 187. String Quintet Op. 6 No. 2 in A major
- HV 188. String Quintet Op. 6 No. 1 in B♭ major
- HV 189. Flute Quintet in D major
- HV 190. String Quartet Op. 1 No. 1 in D major
- HV 191. String Quartet Op. 1 No. 2 in C minor
- HV 192. String Quartet Op. 1 No. 3 in B♭ major
- HV 193. String Quartet Op. 10 No. 1 in E♭ major
- HV 193a. String Quartet Op. 2 in E♭ major
- HV 194. String Quartet Op. 10 No. 2 in A major
- HV 194a. String Quartet Op. 3 in A major
- HV 195. String Quartet Op. 10 No. 3 in C major
- HV 195a. String Quartet Op. 4 in C major
- HV 196. Variations "Augustin" for string quartet in G major
- HV 197. String Trio Op. 2 in C major
- HV 198. Piano Trio Op. 4 in E♭ major
- HV 199. Sonata for piano & violin Op. 9 No. 1 in C major
- HV 200. Sonata for piano & violin Op. 9 No. 2 in F major
- HV 201. Sonata for piano & violin Op. 9 No. 3 in B♭ major
- HV 202. Sonata for piano & violin in E♭ major
- HV 203. Sonata for 2 cellos Op. 7 No. 1 in G major
- HV 204. Sonata for 2 cellos Op. 7 No. 2 in D minor
- HV 205. 12 Minuets for piano
- HV 206. 12 German Dances with trios for piano
- HV 207. 12 German Dances with trios for piano
- HV 208. 12 Minuets with trios for piano
- HV 209. 12 German Dances for piano
- HV 210. 8 German Dances with trios for piano
- HV 211. 12 Dances for piano
- HV 212. 9 Dances for piano "Alexander's Favorit"
- HV 213. 10 Variations for piano in F major
- HV 214. 12 Variations for piano in A major
- HV 215. 12 Variations for piano
- HV 216. 3 Marches for piano
- HV 217. 12 Lieder
- HV 218. Lied: Auf Weihnacht in E major
- HV 219. Lied: Klagtöne in A♭ major
- HV 220. Lied: Das Wohltun (lost)
- HV 221. Lied: Von allen Sterblichen auf Erden (lost)
- HV 222. Studies for voice & continuo
- HV 223. Lied: Getröstetes Heimweh in E major
- HV 224. Lied: Danklied an Gott in E major
- HV 225. Lied: Ich will vertrauen in F major
- HV 226. Auf Brüder auf in B♭ major
- HV 227. Des Volkes Wunsch in C major
- HV 228. Canon: Frau Mutter schönen Namenstag in G major
- HV 229. Canon: Des Lebens sich zu freuen in B♭ major
- HV 230. Canon: Wann i a Räuscherl hab in B♭ major
- HV 231. Canon: Wohin du reisest, sei glücklich
- HV 232. Choral: Hymne an Gott in E major
- HV 233. Choral: Abendlied an einen Freund in A minor
- HV 234. Choral: Leichengesang in A♭ major
- HV 235. Ode an Joseph Haydn vom Fräulein Gabriele von Baumberg in C major
- HV 236. Ode an Joseph Haydn vom Fräulein Gabriele von Baumberg in A minor
- HV 237. Choral: Freimaurerkantate in F major
- HV 238. Choral: Aus dem blühenden Vereine (fragment)
- HV 239. Choral: Zufriedenheit mit Wenigen in B♭ major
- HV 240. Es töne dann in rascher Saiten Sturme in D major
- HV 241. Arrangement of Mozart's requiem in D minor
- HV 242. Arrangement of Haydn's Gott erhalte Franz for orchestra in G major
- HV 243. Choral after Haydn's Schöpfung (lost)
- HV 244. Arrangement of Pergolesi's Stabat Mater in F minor
- HV 245. Arrangement of Weigl's overture to Nachtigal und Rabe for piano in F major
- HV 246. Sketches of a Kyrie and a Gloria for a Mass
- HV 247. Mythological Ballet in E♭ major (fragment)
- HV 248. String Trio in E♭ major (fragment)
- HV 249. Choral: Laßt uns ihr Brüder in F major (fragment)
- HV 250. Choral: Der Wanderer in C major (fragment)
- HV 251. Missa Sancti Buon Compleannon in G major for piano

== Notes ==
=== References ===
- Eva Badura-Skoda with Hildegard Herrmann-Schneider (n.d.) "Eybler, Joseph [Josef] Leopold, Edler von". Grove Music Online (subscription required)
- Entry for Eybler in The Grove Concise Dictionary of Music, 1994, Oxford University Press, Inc.
- Program notes by Cordula Timm-Hartmann for Eybler's String Quintet and String Trio, 2005 recording by the Quintett Momento Musicale (MDG 603 1321-2)
- Joseph Eybler String Quintet Op. 6 No. 1, sound-bites and short bio
- Article on Eybler in Mozart Forum by Gary Smith
