= John Mahon (composer) =

John Mahon (also Mahone, Mahoon; 1749–1834) was an Irish composer, clarinetist, violinist, and viola player.

== Life ==
Mahon was born in Oxford into an Irish family of musicians. His father William Mahon is thought to have gone to Oxford from Salisbury in the 1740s and to have been an orchestral player in the Holywell Music Room. His siblings were James Mahon, William Mahon, and Sarah Mahon, who were likewise musicians.

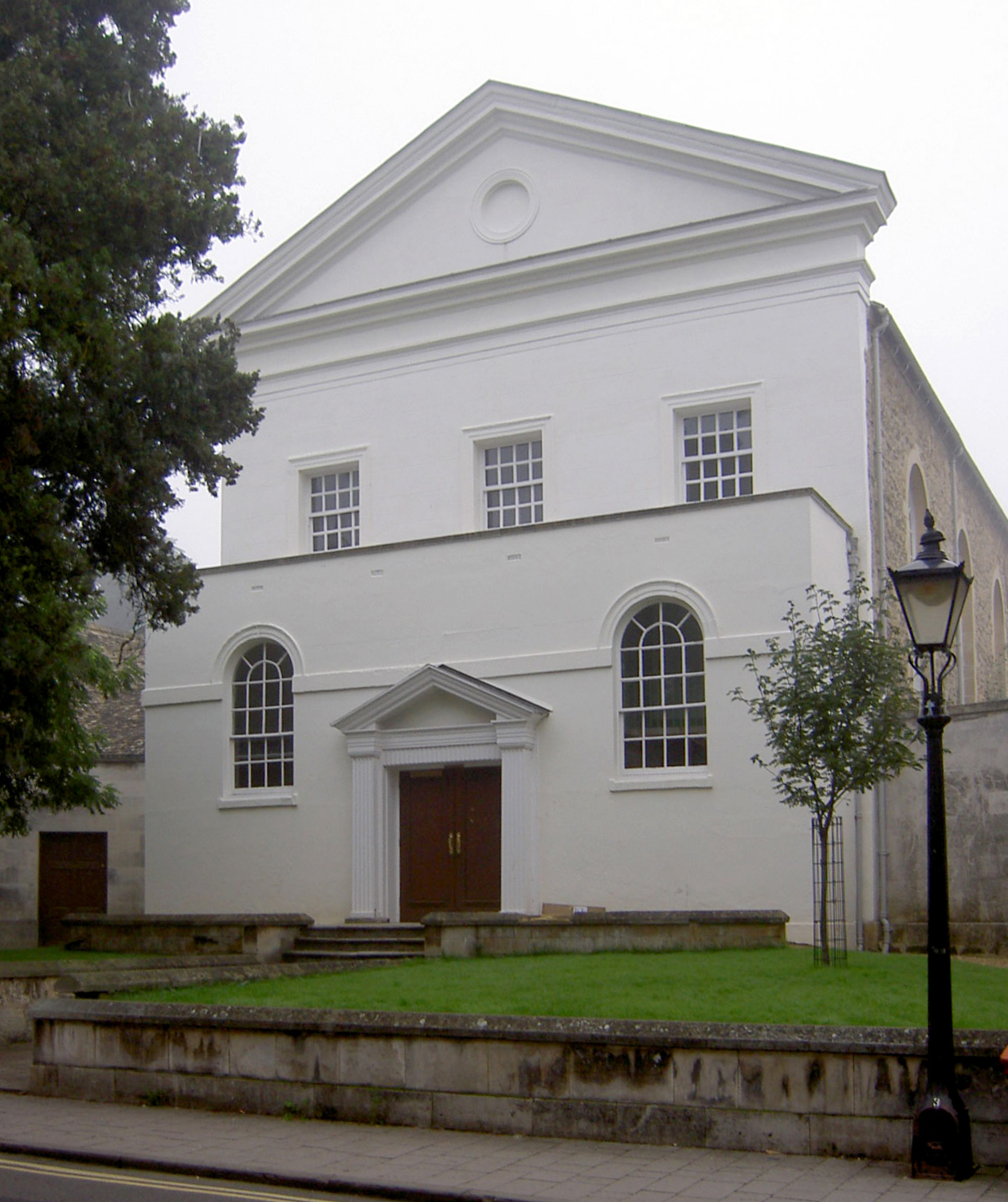
View of the Holywell Music Room (2008)

Mahon performed his clarinet debut at the Holywell Music Room, Oxford, in 1772 with a clarinet concerto. Mahon was a member of the Oxford Volunteers Band. In 1773 he played in London and by 1777 he moved in with his brother William Mahon to live there. In London, John appeared at Covent Garden, Hanover Square, the Haymarket, the Pantheon, and the Ranelagh. John made several lengthy visits to his hometown of Dublin during his life. In 1783 he became a member of the Royal Society of Musicians and played at the annual benefit concerts at St. Paul's Cathedral in May 1794, 1795, and 1797. Mahon married Margaret Perry in Dublin (30 June 1792). John Mahon had many financial troubles in 1814. The Royal Society of Musicians illustrated his difficulties stating he was "infirm" and requested relief, in which he was granted £40. On 6 October 1816, Mahon sent word that he had received a serious wound in his left hand, which would take two to three months to cure and was granted an additional £30. Mahon eventually retired to Dublin in 1825.

Mahon died in Dublin, in January 1834, due to ill health. Mrs. Mahon was granted £1 per month survivor's assistance plus £8 for her own eventual funeral expenses.

== Compositions ==
- Concerto for Clarinet No. 2 in F Major
- Duets (4) for 2 Clarinets: No. 4 in B Flat Major
- Duets (4) for 2 Clarinets: No. 1 in F Major
