= Clarinet Concerto (Hindemith) =

Musical composition by Hindemith

The Clarinet Concerto by Paul Hindemith was premiered on 11 December 1950 by Benny Goodman, for whom it was composed in 1947, with the Philadelphia Orchestra, conducted by Eugene Ormandy. The composer commented that "I tried to give Benny a pleasant and very 'clarinetistic' piece, a piece he would enjoy playing and that would convey his mellow and meaningful virtuosity to the listener." The concerto has four movements and is composed in a "quasi-neo-classical manner". The movements are a sonata-allegro, a scherzo, a variation, and a rondo.
