= Maurice Gendron =

French cellist, conductor and teacher

Maurice Gendron (26 December 1920, near Nice – 20 August 1990, Grez-sur-Loing) was a French cellist, conductor and teacher. He is widely considered one of the greatest cellists of the 20th century. He was an Officer of the Legion of Honor and a recipient of the National Order of Merit. He was an active member of the French Resistance during World War II.

Gendron recorded most of the standard concerto repertoire with conductors such as Bernard Haitink, Raymond Leppard, and Pablo Casals (the only cellist to appear on a commercial recording under Casals's baton), and with orchestras such as the Vienna State Opera Orchestra, the London Symphony Orchestra, and the London Philharmonic Orchestra. He also recorded the sonata repertoire with pianists such as Philippe Entremont and Jean Françaix. For 25 years he was a member of a celebrated piano trio with Yehudi and Hephzibah Menuhin. He also made a famous recording (earning an Edison Award) of J. S. Bach's solo cello suites.

Gendron played with many musical stars of his time, including Benjamin Britten, Dinu Lipatti and Rudolf Serkin. The 1693 Stradivarius he played, which has become known as the ex-Gendron cello, was subsequently on loan to German cellist Maria Kliegel.

Gendron taught at the Musikhochschule Saarbrücken, the Yehudi Menuhin School and at the Paris Conservatoire. His students include Colin Carr, Chu Yibing and Jacqueline du Pré. In 2013 a former student alleged that Gendron was abusive toward young students during his time at the Yehudi Menuhin School in the '60s and '70s. Richard Hillier, the headmaster at YMS, has said he is aware of the allegations but that according to school documents, no concerns were raised about Gendron's behaviour. Other students of Gendron have described him as a very strict, even problematic teacher, but an influential one.

Gendron was the first modern cellist to record Boccherini's Concerto in B-flat in its original form (he discovered the original manuscript in the Dresden State Library) instead of Grützmacher's version. This recording has been widely acclaimed by critics and is considered a classic. He gave the first Western performance of Prokofiev's Cello Concerto with the London Philharmonic Orchestra under Walter Susskind, and was subsequently given exclusive rights to the piece's performance for 3 years.

His approach to cello playing is summed up in his book "L'Art du Violoncelle", written in collaboration with Walter Grimmer and published in 1999 by Schott [ED 9176; ISMN M-001-12682-3].

Gendron is the father of the actor François-Éric Gendron.

Apart from several other currently available recordings, in 2015 Decca launched a 14-CD boxset, "L’Art de Maurice Gendron" (catalogue number 4823849), which comprises all his recordings for Decca and Philips in addition to some of his most relevant work for EMI.

== Links ==
- Maurice Gendron 1961, touring Southern Africa
