= Jean Françaix =

French composer (1912–1997)

- Françaix, in the 1960s
- Born: 23 May 1912; Le Mans, France
- Died: 25 September 1997 (aged 85); Paris, France
- Education: Conservatoire de Paris
- Occupations: Composer; Pianist
- Works: List of compositions
- Awards: Officier de la Légion d'honneur

Jean René Désiré Françaix (French: [fʁɑ̃sɛ]; 23 May 1912 – 25 September 1997) was a French neoclassical composer, pianist, and orchestrator known for his prolific output and vibrant style. Françaix composed for various genres, and is particularly known for his chamber works for piano as well as wind instruments.

== Life ==
Françaix was born in Le Mans. His natural gifts were encouraged from an early age by his family. His father, Alfred Françaix, was Director of the Conservatoire of Le Mans as well as a musicologist, composer, and pianist; His mother, Jeanne Françaix, was a teacher of singing. Jean Françaix studied at the Conservatoire of Le Mans and then at the Paris Conservatory, and was only six when he took up composing, with a style heavily influenced by Ravel. Françaix's first publication, in 1922, caught the attention of a composer working for the publishing house, who steered the gifted boy towards a gifted teacher, Nadia Boulanger (who, after her sister's death in 1918, had given up composing and devoted her life to teaching, conducting, and playing the organ). Boulanger encouraged Françaix's career, considering the young composer to be one of the best, if not the best, of her students. Noted pianist and pedagogue Isidor Philipp also taught him. Françaix himself often played his own works, to public acclaim; notably in the premiere of his Concertino for Piano and Orchestra at the festival of Baden-Baden in 1932.

By 1932, Françaix had his Huit Bagatelles played at the Vienna Festival by the Kolisch Quartet and himself at the piano, while in Paris his Concertino for piano and orchestra was performed in 1933. Françaix's compositions continued to be played during the 1930s in Paris. A string trio (1933), a fantaisie for cello and orchestra, three duos for two sopranos, a sonatine for violin and piano, a quintet, and a serenade for small orchestra (1934). 1935 saw the premiere of his Quadruple Concerto for Flute, Oboe, Clarinet, Bassoon and Orchestra, and of a piano concerto in 1936.

Françaix's music was also used for ballets: Le Roi nu, Les Malheurs de Sophie (both for Paris) and Jeu Sentimental (for Brussels). Les Malheurs de Sophie was composed in 1935 and was based on French children's literature of the same name. This was the composer's third ballet (it was preceded by Scuola di Ballo and Beach, both from 1933) and here at last he found a subject that was ideal for his special brand of brilliant and even childlike invention.

Françaix was an accomplished pianist from an early age, earning a First Prize in Piano at the Paris Conservatory, and toured throughout Europe and the U.S. He performed notably in a duo with the French cellist Maurice Gendron, and also performed Poulenc's Two-Piano Concerto with Francis Poulenc for several engagements when Jacques Février was not available. Françaix even premiered his concerto for two pianos with his daughter, pianist Claude Françaix, in 1964.

Jean Françaix's primary occupation was his extraordinarily active compositional career.

Françaix was named an Officier de la Légion d'honneur in 1991.

He remained prolific throughout his life; even in 1981, Françaix described himself as "constantly composing", barely finishing one piece before beginning another, and continued thus until his death in 1997 in Paris.

== Music ==
Maurice Ravel said of the young Françaix to the boy's parents, "Among the child's gifts I observe above all the most fruitful an artist can possess, that of curiosity: you must not stifle these precious gifts now or ever, or risk letting this young sensibility wither." They did not, and he flourished: Françaix was a prolific composer, writing over 200 pieces in a wide variety of styles.

Since he was a virtuoso pianist, many of his works feature the piano, particularly his numerous chamber works which he wrote for nearly every orchestral instrument and standard ensemble. He was a skilled orchestrator, which was reflected in his use of tone colors. Françaix wrote the majority of his earlier works for saxophone between the mid-1930s and the early 1960s. Françaix wrote pieces in many of the major large musical forms, including concerti, symphonies, opera, theatre, ballet, and works drawing on traditions falling out of favor in the 20th century, such as the cantata. One of his oratorios, entitled L'apocalypse selon St. Jean and written in 1939, "employs choral psalmody and full orchestra, with a second instrumental group that included saxophones, accordion, mandolin, and guitar (depicting Hell); the work was performed at the ISCM in Vienna (1932) and Palermo (1949)". Though he often put his own modern spin on the old modes of expression, he was an avowed neoclassicist who rejected atonality and formless wanderings, and he drew from great literature of the past for his vocal settings. He also wrote ten film scores for director Sacha Guitry.

Françaix's style is marked by lightness and wit, as well as a conversational style of interplay between the musical lines. It changed little throughout his career; while he was influenced by composers he admired (such as Emmanuel Chabrier, Igor Stravinsky, Maurice Ravel, and Francis Poulenc), he integrated what he picked up into his own distinct aesthetic, which was already evident in his early works.

== Selected works ==
For the complete list see List of compositions by Jean Françaix.

- Scherzo (1932), his first mature work for solo piano
- Huit Bagatelles, for piano and string quartet (1932)
- Concertino for piano and orchestra (1932)
- String trio (1933)
- Quartet for winds (1933)
- Beach, ballet (1933)
- Sonatine, for violin and piano (1934)
- Quintet, for flute, harp and string trio (1934)
- Sérénade, for small orchestra (1934)
- Sérénade (Andantino from the 'Sérénade for small orchestra', 1934) – (arr. Maurice Gendron, 1953)
- Petit quatuor, saxophone quartet (1935)
- Le Malheurs de Sophie, ballet (1935)
- Piano concerto (1936)
- Cinq portraits de jeunes filles, piano (1936)
- Le Diable boiteux, Opera (1937)
- Rondino staccato (from the Opera Le Diable boiteux, 1937) – (arr. Maurice Gendron, 1953)
- L'apocalypse selon Saint-Jean, Oratorio (1939)
- L'apostrophe, a musical comedy (1940)
- Berceuse (from 'L'Apostrophe', 1940) – (arr. Maurice Gendron, 1953)
- Divertissement for bassoon and string quintet, or orchestra (1942) – dedicated to William Waterhouse
- L'Arlequin blanc, ballet (1944)
- Mouvement perpétuel (from 'L'Arlequin blanc', 1944) – (arr. Maurice Gendron, 1953)
- L'Heure du Berger, sextet for piano and wind quintet (1947)
- Wind quintet No.1 (1948)
- Les demoiselles de la nuit, ballet (1948)
- Nocturne (from Les demoiselles de la nuit, 1948) – (arr. Maurice Gendron, 1951)
- Symphony in G (1953)
- Divertimento, for horn and piano (1953)
- Divertimento, for flute and piano (1953; orchestrated in 1974)
- Napoléon, film score (1954)
- Si Paris nous était conté film score (1956)
- L'horloge de flore, for oboe and orchestra (1959)
- Harpsichord concerto (1959)
- Suite for solo flute (1962)
- Six preludes, for string orchestra (1963)
- Double piano concerto (1965)
- La princesse de Clèves, Opera (1965)
- Flute concerto (1966)
- Clarinet concerto (1967)
- Violin concerto No.1 (1968)
- Quartet, for cor anglais and string trio (1970)
- Concerto for double bass and orchestra (1974)
- Le gai Paris, for trumpet and winds (1974)
- Cassazione, for three orchestras (1975)
- Cinque piccoli duetti, for flute and harp (1975)
- Variations sur un thème plaisant, for piano and winds (1976)
- Quintet for clarinet and string quartet (1977)
- Serenade, for guitar (1978)
- Concerto for bassoon and 11 strings (1979)
- Impromptu, for flute and 11 strings (1983)
- Concerto, for trombone and 10 wind instruments (1983)
- Sonata for recorder and guitar (1984)
- Double concerto for flute, clarinet, and orchestra (1991)
- Accordion concerto (1993)
- Trio for oboe, bassoon, and piano (1994) – dedicated to William Waterhouse
- Sonate for flute and piano (1996)
- Neuf historiettes de Tallemant des Réaux for baritone voice, tenor saxophone, and piano (1997) -Françaix's last completed work-
- Marche triomphale for 4 trumpets and organ
