= Clarinet Concerto (Françaix) =

Musical composition by Jean Françaix

Jean Françaix's Clarinet Concerto was composed in 1967–68.

Françaix dedicated the concerto to conductor Fernand Oubradous. It premiered on July 20, 1968, and the clarinet soloist was Jacques Lancelot. It is widely considered one of the most difficult in the clarinet repertoire.
