= Fernand Oubradous =

French bassoonist, conductor and composer

Fernand Oubradous (12 February 1903 – 6 January 1986) was a French bassoonist, conductor and composer. Born in Paris, he studied in his native city with André Bloch. He composed a series of tutors called Enseignement Complet du Basson in three parts Published by Alphonse Leduc. He taught at the Conservatoire National Superieur in Paris and at the Mozarteum in Salzburg. He founded the Académie internationale d'été de Nice. He died in Paris.
