= XIX International Chopin Piano Competition =

2025 piano competition

The Nineteenth International Fryderyk Chopin Piano Competition
- Official poster
- Date: 23 April – 4 May 2025 (preliminary round); 2–23 October 2025 (main stage)
- Venue: National Philharmonic, Warsaw, Poland
- Hosted by: Fryderyk Chopin Institute
- Winner: (United States) Eric Lu
- Website: chopincompetition.pl/en

The XIX International Chopin Piano Competition (Polish: XIX Międzynarodowy Konkurs Pianistyczny im. Fryderyka Chopina) was held from 2 to 23 October 2025 in Warsaw, Poland.

The 2025 competition marked the beginning of the International Chopin Piano Competition's centenary celebrations and drew a record 642 applicants. Following a preliminary round, in which 162 candidates were selected to perform, 85 pianists were admitted to the main stage, including 19 prize-winners of other major piano competitions who qualified directly. The competition proceeded through three solo stages, after which eleven pianists advanced to the final. For the first time, finalists were required to perform the Polonaise-Fantaisie, Op. 61, in addition to one of Chopin's two piano concertos with the Warsaw Philharmonic Orchestra.

The competition was won by Eric Lu of the United States, with Kevin Chen of Canada taking second place and Zitong Wang of China third. The jury's verdict was met with some surprise by commentators, as no clear frontrunner had emerged during the competition, in contrast to previous editions. Jury chairman Garrick Ohlsson noted that the deliberations had been long and difficult.

== Background ==
The Chopin Competition is considered Poland's most important musical event and one of the most prestigious piano competitions in the world. Commentators have called the event the "Olympics of the piano world"; Joshua Barone of The New York Times wrote that victory can be "just as glorious as a gold medal". The competition generates a nationwide cultural phenomenon described as "Chopin-mania"; according to the Chopin Institute, tickets released online in October 2024 sold out within 30 minutes, with those for the finals selling out in two minutes. This demand extended to the box office, with hundreds of people queuing for hours, often from before 5 a.m., for a limited number of standby tickets to the daily auditions. Jury member Nelson Goerner called the public's engagement a "kind of national passion", asking, "where else would people queue for hours to hear a dozen pianists perform the same waltz?"

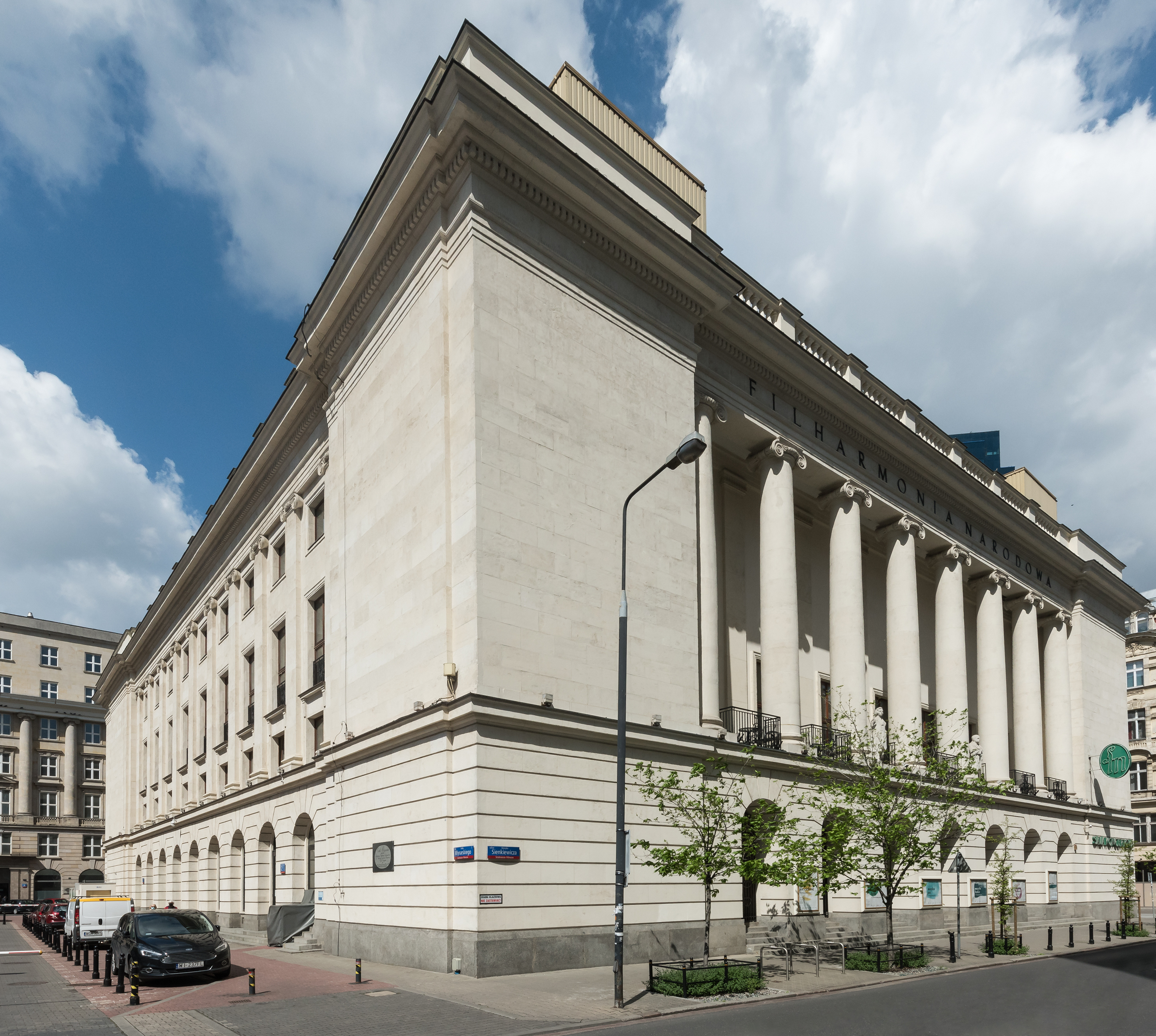
The National Philharmonic in Warsaw hosted the competition.

Pianists born between 1995 and 2009 were eligible to participate. A record 642 pianists applied, which Fryderyk Chopin Institute Director Artur Szklener characterized as a sign of both the expanding pool of excellent pianists and the increasing difficulty talented musicians face in forging careers in a commercialized market. Wojciech Grzędziński, who has served as the competition's official photographer since 2005, noted a significant shift in the profile of the participants. He observed that while competitors in 2005 were often at the very beginning of their careers, the pianists in recent editions are "young professionals" who arrive with established careers and use the competition to "consolidate" their standing in the classical music world. The competitor pool also reflected a notable geographical shift, with Asian pianists particularly prominent.

=== Centenary celebrations ===
The 2025 edition held special significance as it marked the beginning of the competition's centenary celebrations. The official 100th anniversary falls in 2027, but the Fryderyk Chopin Institute initiated a five-year series of events and projects that began on 2 October 2025 and will culminate with the 20th edition in 2030. Director Artur Szklener said the competition represented "a century of musical heritage, a galaxy of the most outstanding pianists of the twentieth and twenty-first centuries, but also a completely new social phenomenon: a sort of nationwide celebration of Chopin's music".

The centenary prompted a number of accompanying events that transformed Warsaw into a city-wide celebration of the composer. Initiatives included "music lover zones" (strefy melomana) where audiences could watch live broadcasts; over 30 establishments creating special Chopin-themed menus, desserts, and cocktails; a multimedia laser show set to Chopin's music at the Polish Army Stadium; jazz concerts at Chopin's birthplace in Żelazowa Wola; and a new film, Chopin, a Sonata in Paris, which premiered at the Gdynia Film Festival. Numerous exhibitions were held across the city, including an immersive experience titled "Romantic Chopin", outdoor displays of archival photographs, and a temporary exhibition at the Fryderyk Chopin Museum organized in collaboration with the Musée de la Vie romantique in Paris. Further plans for the 2027 anniversary include a festival in Warsaw featuring past prize-winners, concerts around the world, and a Global Chopin Gala of interconnected concerts spanning time zones from Tokyo to Vancouver.

=== Russian participants ===
The 2025 competition was the first held since the 2022 Russian invasion of Ukraine. Organizers announced that Russian pianists would be admitted only as "individual neutral pianists", a policy the Chopin Institute compared to that for athletes at the Paris Olympics. Participants from Russia were also required to sign a statement condemning the violation of international law. Two pianists, Philipp Lynov and Andrey Zenin, were admitted under these conditions.

=== Poster competition ===
An international competition organized by the Fryderyk Chopin Institute and the Academy of Fine Arts in Warsaw selected the poster design for promoting the competition. Fifteen artists submitted a total of 30 entries. The jury, consisting of Błażej Ostoja Lniski, Prot Jarnuszkiewicz, Mieczysław Wasilewski, and Artur Szklener, awarded the 40,000 złoty (US$10,000) prize to Marcin Władyka. All submitted poster designs were exhibited from 1 to 31 October 2025 at the Academy's Czapski Palace.

== Preliminary stage ==
The preliminary stage was held from 23 April to 4 May 2025 in the Chamber Music Hall of the National Philharmonic in Warsaw. Participants were required to perform the following works:

Preliminary stage program
One of: Étude Op. 10, No. 1; Étude Op. 10, No. 4; Étude Op. 10, No. 5; Étude Op. 10, No. 8; Étude Op. 10, No. 12; Étude Op. 25, No. 11	One of: Étude Op. 10, No. 2; Étude Op. 10, No. 7; Étude Op. 10, No. 10; Étude Op. 10, No. 11; Étude Op. 25, No. 4; Étude Op. 25, No. 5; Étude Op. 25, No. 6; Étude Op. 25, No. 10	One of: Nocturnes, Op. 9, No. 3; Nocturnes, Op. 27, No. 1 or 2; Nocturnes, Op. 37, No. 2; Nocturnes, Op. 48, No. 1 or 2; Nocturnes, Op. 55, No. 2; Nocturnes, Op. 62, No. 1 or 2; Étude Op. 10, No. 3; Étude Op. 10, No. 6; Étude Op. 25, No. 7	One of: Scherzo No. 1, Op. 20; Scherzo No. 2, Op. 31; Scherzo No. 3, Op. 39; Scherzo No. 4, Op. 54	One of: Mazurkas, Op. 24, No. 4; Mazurkas, Op. 30, No. 3 or 4; Mazurkas, Op. 33, No. 4; Mazurkas, Op. 41, No. 1 or 4; Mazurkas, Op. 50, No. 1 or 3; Mazurkas, Op. 56, No. 1 or 3; Mazurkas, Op. 59, No. 1 or 3

Ultimately, 642 pianists applied to the competition. Of these, 162 contestants from 28 countries were selected to perform in the preliminary stage, with the jury admitting 66 to the main stage. They were joined by an additional 19 pianists who qualified directly to the main stage by winning major piano competitions. Szklener commented on the exceptionally high and even artistic level of the participants in the preliminary round, stating that the jury found it difficult to make selections from what he described as an "exceptional generation of young artists" from around the world.

Competitors of the preliminary round
Competitor	Country	Result
Masaharu Kambara	Japan	
Masaya Kamei	Japan	
Uladzislau Khandohi	Belarus	
David Khrikuli	Georgia	To Stage I
Hayoung Kim	South Korea	
Jeonghwan Kim	Germany	
Jiin Kim	South Korea	
Junhyung Kim	South Korea	
Sunah Kim	South Korea	
Sakurako Kita	Japan	
Elizaveta Kliuchereva	Individual neutral pianist Germany	
Antoni Kłeczek	United States; Poland	To Stage I
Pavle Krstić	Bulgaria; Serbia	
Shushi Kyomasu	Japan	To Stage I
Ariya Laothitipong	Thailand	
Gichang Lee	South Korea	
Kwanwook Lee	South Korea	To Stage I
Bowen Li	China	
Luwangzi Li	China	To Stage I
Tianyou Li	China	To Stage I
Xiaoxuan Li	China	To Stage I
Xinjie Li	China	
Zhexiang Li	China	To Stage I
Juhee Lim	South Korea	
Hao-Wei Lin	Taiwan	To Stage I
Yanan Liu	China	
Ziyu Liu	China	
Jiaqing Luo	China	
Zheng Luo	China	
Tianyao Lyu	China	To Stage I
Zhiqian Lyu	China	
Julia Łozowska	Poland	
Tiankun Ma	China	To Stage I
Megumi Maekawa	Japan United States	
Anastasiya Magamedova	United States; Tajikistan	
Iskandarkhon Mamadaliev	Uzbekistan	
Xuanyi Mao	China	To Stage I
Gregory Martin	United States	
Ruben Micieli	Italy	To Stage I
Nathalia Milstein	France	To Stage I
Maria Moliszewska	Poland	
Yumeka Nakagawa	Japan	To Stage I
Yulia Nakashima	Japan; South Korea	To Stage I
Fanze Yang	China	To Stage I
Juan Mas Choclán	Spain	
Yuya Nishimoto	Japan	To Stage I
Anna Ojiro	Japan	
Vincent Ong	Malaysia	To Stage I
Arisa Onoda	Japan	To Stage I
Wenyuan Pan	China	
Chaelin Park	South Korea	
Jinhyung Park	South Korea	
Yehuda Prokopowicz	Poland	To Stage I
Tommaso Boggian	Italy	
Yangyue Qin	China	
Hao Rao	China	To Stage I
Ingrid Rodrigues Uemura	Brazil	
Zuzanna Sejbuk	Poland	To Stage I
Efe Sen	Turkey	
Hanwen Shi	China	
Kotaro Shigemori	Japan	
Jun Shimada	Japan	To Stage I
Hyojin Shin	South Korea	
Miyu Shindo	Japan	To Stage I
Mana Shoji	Japan	To Stage I
Vitaly Starikov	Israel	To Stage I (Withdrew)
Gabriele Strata	Italy	To Stage I
Eva Strejcová	Czechia	To Stage I
Szu-Yu Su	Taiwan	
Fansum Kenny Sun	China	
Haolun Sun	China	
Yutong Sun	China	
Qianlin Tan	China	
Nachuan Tao	China	
Ziye Tao	China	To Stage I
Hao Tian	China	
Shunshun Tie	China	
Mateusz Tomica	Poland	
Julian Trevelyan	United Kingdom	
Vojtěch Trubač	Czechia	
Eric Guo	Canada	To Stage I
Yubo Deng	China	To Stage I
Kiron Atom Tellian	Austria	
Rikako Tsujimoto	Japan	
Chun Lam U	Hong Kong	To Stage I
Liya Wang	China	
Quanlin Wang	China	
Ryan Wang	Canada	To Stage I
Yuhang Wang	China	
Zitong Wang	China	To Stage I
Jan Widlarz	Poland	To Stage I
Kwan Chai Wong	Individual neutral pianist	
Sze Yuen Wong	China	
Victoria Wong	United States; Canada	To Stage I
Maiqi Wu	China	To Stage I
Yifan Wu	China	To Stage I
Zihao Wu	China	
Lingfei (Stephan) Xie	China	
Kongyan Xin	China	
Miki Yamagata	Japan	To Stage I
Ryota Yamazaki	Japan	To Stage I
Việt Trung Nguyễn	Vietnam; Poland	To Stage I
Jiwon Yang	South Korea	
Yuanfan Yang	United Kingdom	To Stage I
Jialin Yao	China	
Adria Ye	United States	
ZiRui Ye	China	
Yoonji Yeo	South Korea	
Sung Ho Yoo	South Korea	
Jeong Hyun Yoon	South Korea	
Bartłomiej Kokot	Poland	
Yichen Yu	China	To Stage I
Yuewen Yu	China	To Stage I
Andrey Zenin	Individual neutral pianist	To Stage I
Jacky Xiaoyu Zhang	United Kingdom	To Stage I
Junzhe Zhang	China	
Nathaniel Zhang	United States	
Zhiqiao Zhang	China	
Yuxuan Zhao	China	
Yonghuan Zhong	China	To Stage I
Hanyuan Zhu	China	To Stage I
Shio Okui	Japan	
Harmony Zhu	Canada	
Jingting Zhu	China	To Stage I
Vladimir Aćimović	Serbia	
Yuki Amako	Japan	
Yanyan Bao	China	To Stage I
Michał Basista	Poland	To Stage I
Nicolas Bourdoncle	France	
Simon Bürki	Switzerland	
Michelle Candotti	Italy	
Zhiqian Cen	China	
Junho Cha	South Korea	
Kai-Min Chang	Taiwan	To Stage I
Xuehong Chen	China	To Stage I
Hyo Lee	South Korea	To Stage I
Yanjun Chen	China	
Yiyang Chen	China	
Zixi Chen	China	To Stage I
Hoi Leong Cheong	China; Portugal	To Stage I
Mariam Chitanava	Georgia	
Hyena Cho	South Korea	
Raphaël Collard	France	
Diana Cooper	France; United Kingdom	To Stage I
Athena Deng	Canada	To Stage I
Peida Du	China	
YuAng Fan	China	To Stage I
Zhongjin Fang	China	
Yang Gao	China	
Yang (Jack) Gao	China	To Stage I
Inho Gi	South Korea	
Shuguang Gong	China	To Stage I
Yiming Guo	China	
Wei-Ting Hsieh	Taiwan	To Stage I
Xiaoyu Hu	China	To Stage I
Hasan Ignatov	Bulgaria	To Stage I
Ibrahim Ignatov	Bulgaria	
Riko Imai	Japan	
Hina Inazumi	Japan	
Seika Ishida	Japan	
Asaki Iwai	Japan	
Hyun-Gyu Ji	South Korea	
Zihan Jin	China	To Stage I

An additional 19 pianists qualified to the main stage directly by winning major piano competitions:

Competitors admitted directly into the main stage
Competitor	Country	Admission through
Piotr Alexewicz	Poland	(gold) 2020 Polish Fryderyk Chopin National Piano Competition
Jonas Aumiller	Germany	(silver) 2024 Hamamatsu International Piano Competition
Kevin Chen	Canada	(gold) 2023 Arthur Rubinstein International Piano Master Competition
Mateusz Dubiel	Poland	(gold) 2025 Polish Fryderyk Chopin National Piano Competition
Alberto Ferro	Italy	(silver) 2015 Ferruccio Busoni International Piano Competition
Adam Kałduński	Poland	(silver) 2020 Polish Fryderyk Chopin National Piano Competition
Kaito Kobayashi	Japan	(silver) 2021 Leeds International Piano Competition
Mateusz Krzyżowski	Poland	(gold) 2022 International Paderewski Piano Competition
Shiori Kuwahara	Japan	(silver) 2021 Arthur Rubinstein International Piano Master Competition; (silver) 2019 Ferruccio Busoni International Piano Competition
Hyuk Lee	South Korea	(gold) 2016 International Paderewski Piano Competition
Pedro López Salas	Spain	(silver) 2022 International Paderewski Piano Competition
Eric Lu	United States	(gold) 2018 Leeds International Piano Competition
Philipp Lynov	Individual neutral pianist	(gold) 2019 International Paderewski Piano Competition
Piotr Pawlak	Poland	(silver) 2020 Polish Fryderyk Chopin National Piano Competition
Anthony Ratinov	United States	(silver) 2025 National Chopin Piano Competition of the USA; (silver) 2023 Ferruccio Busoni International Piano Competition
Tomoharu Ushida	Japan	(silver) 2018 Hamamatsu International Piano Competition
Andrzej Wierciński	Poland	(gold) 2015 Polish Fryderyk Chopin National Piano Competition
Krzysztof Wierciński	Poland	(silver) 2025 Polish Fryderyk Chopin National Piano Competition
William Yang	United States	(gold) 2025 National Chopin Piano Competition of the USA

== Main stage ==
The main competition from 3 to 20 October consisted of three stages and a final. An inaugural concert was held on 2 October, and the prize-winners' concerts took place from 21 to 23 October.

Calendar (CEST)
2 Oct	3 Oct	4 Oct	5 Oct	6 Oct	7 Oct	8 Oct	9 Oct	10 Oct	11 Oct	12 Oct	13 Oct	14 Oct	15 Oct	16 Oct	17 Oct	18 Oct	19 Oct	20 Oct	21 Oct	22 Oct	23 Oct
Inaugural concert 20:00	Stage I 10:00 (morning session); 17:00 (evening session)						Stage II 10:00 (morning session); 17:00 (evening session)					Stage III 10:00 (morning session); 17:00 (evening session)				Final 18:00			Prize-winners' concerts 19:00		

The 2025 edition introduced a new system for determining the order of performances. In previous competitions, a single letter drawn by lot would set the alphabetical order for all stages. Citing scientific research on judging in international music competitions, organizers modified the procedure to address a potential disadvantage for those performing earliest. According to Szklener, jurors require time to establish an internal scale for the competition's artistic level, which can result in the first performances serving as a baseline and potentially receiving less precise or favorable evaluations. To ensure greater fairness, the starting letter for the performance order was advanced by six letters of the Latin alphabet for each successive stage, distributing the early performance slots more evenly among the participants.

=== Program ===
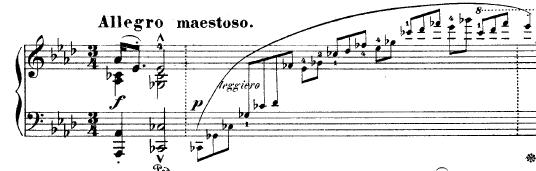
The 2025 edition introduced the Polonaise-Fantaisie, Op. 61, as a required work in the final alongside the piano concerto.

Participants had to select a different program for each stage of the competition. The competition repertoire had to be played from memory and could be performed in any order. Contestants could not play the same piece twice in different stages of the competition, though they could perform pieces they performed in the preliminary round (except the first two etudes) in the main stage. Participants could use any available edition of Chopin's works, though the Chopin National Edition is recommended.

The 2025 edition introduced the Polonaise-Fantaisie, Op. 61, as a required work in the final alongside the piano concerto. According to Szklener, while the piano concertos provide a virtuosic and grand conclusion, they were written early in Chopin's career and offer a limited view of his compositional style at a crucial decision-making stage of the competition. He described the Polonaise-Fantaisie as standing at the opposite pole from the brilliant idiom of the concertos, characterizing it as one of Chopin's last works with quasi-improvisational, dreamlike, and ethereal qualities, featuring harmonically ambiguous passages with almost impressionistic coloring, blurred polonaise rhythm, and an inverted formal structure in which the principal theme serves as the composition's goal rather than its starting point. Szklener said the juxtaposition allows finalists to present a fuller palette of pianistic means and enables jurors to assess their maturity, while the form of the Polonaise-Fantaisie allows for a cohesive artistic narrative in which it paves the way for the concerto, referencing the tradition of the improvised prelude.

Other program changes for 2025 included the addition of a waltz in the first round. Szklener noted that Chopin's waltzes require not just understanding but a profound sense of the gestures of couples on a dance floor. The change also enabled competitors to perform the complete set of 24 Preludes, Op. 28, during the second round. While the complete set could have been played during the previous two competitions in the third round instead of a sonata, the 2025 rules restored the obligatory status of the sonata in the semifinal while extending the maximum duration of the second-round recital to 50 minutes. Szklener expressed satisfaction that 20 participants opted to perform the complete set of preludes, calling the preludes a genre in which Chopin combined references to Bach with a modern compositional approach, investing miniature forms with diverse pianistic and emotional content while transferring architectural relations to the level of the set as a whole.

Competition program
Stage I program
One of: Étude Op. 10, No. 1; Étude Op. 10, No. 2; Étude Op. 25, No. 6; Étude Op. 25, No. 10; Étude Op. 25, No. 11	One of: Nocturnes, Op. 9, No. 3; Nocturnes, Op. 27, No. 1 or 2; Nocturnes, Op. 37, No. 2; Nocturnes, Op. 48, No. 1 or 2; Nocturnes, Op. 55, No. 2; Nocturnes, Op. 62, No. 1 or 2; Étude Op. 10, No. 3; Étude Op. 10, No. 6; Étude Op. 25, No. 7	One of: Grande valse brillante, Op. 18; Waltzes, Op. 34, No. 1; Waltz, Op. 42	One of: Ballade No. 1, Op. 23; Ballade No. 2, Op. 38; Ballade No. 3, Op. 47; Ballade No. 4, Op. 52; Barcarolle, Op. 60; Fantaisie, Op. 49
Stage II program
6 of the Preludes, Op. 28, either No. 7-12 or 13-18 or 19–24	One of: Andante spianato et grande polonaise brillante, Op. 22; Polonaise, Op. 44; Polonaise, Op. 53; Polonaises, Op. 26 (both)	Any other pieces by Chopin to meet the required performing time of 40 to 50 minutes. Performing the full Op. 28 is allowed.	
Stage III program
One sonata: Piano Sonata No. 2, Op. 35; Piano Sonata No. 3, Op. 58	One set of mazurkas: Mazurkas, Op. 17; Mazurkas, Op. 24; Mazurkas, Op. 30; Mazurkas, Op. 33; Mazurkas, Op. 41; Mazurkas, Op. 50; Mazurkas, Op. 56; Mazurkas, Op. 59	Any other pieces by Chopin to meet the required performing time of 45 to 55 minutes	
Final program
Polonaise-Fantaisie, Op. 61		Piano Concerto No. 1, Op. 11 or Piano Concerto No. 2, Op. 21	

=== Piano selection ===
Participants could choose a Steinway, Yamaha, Kawai, Fazioli, or a C. Bechstein. The piano selection process took place from 29 September to 1 October. Each competitor had 15 minutes to make their choice, after which they had to commit to the instrument for the duration of the competition. To ensure a fair and transparent process, the instruments were periodically moved to different positions on stage to account for variations in the hall's acoustics.

Piano selection
Brand		Model	Serial number
S	Steinway & Sons	D-274	D611479
Y	Yamaha	CFX	6524400
F	Fazioli	F278	2783701
K	Shigeru Kawai	SK-EX	2740795
B	C. Bechstein	D-282	219733

== Awards ==
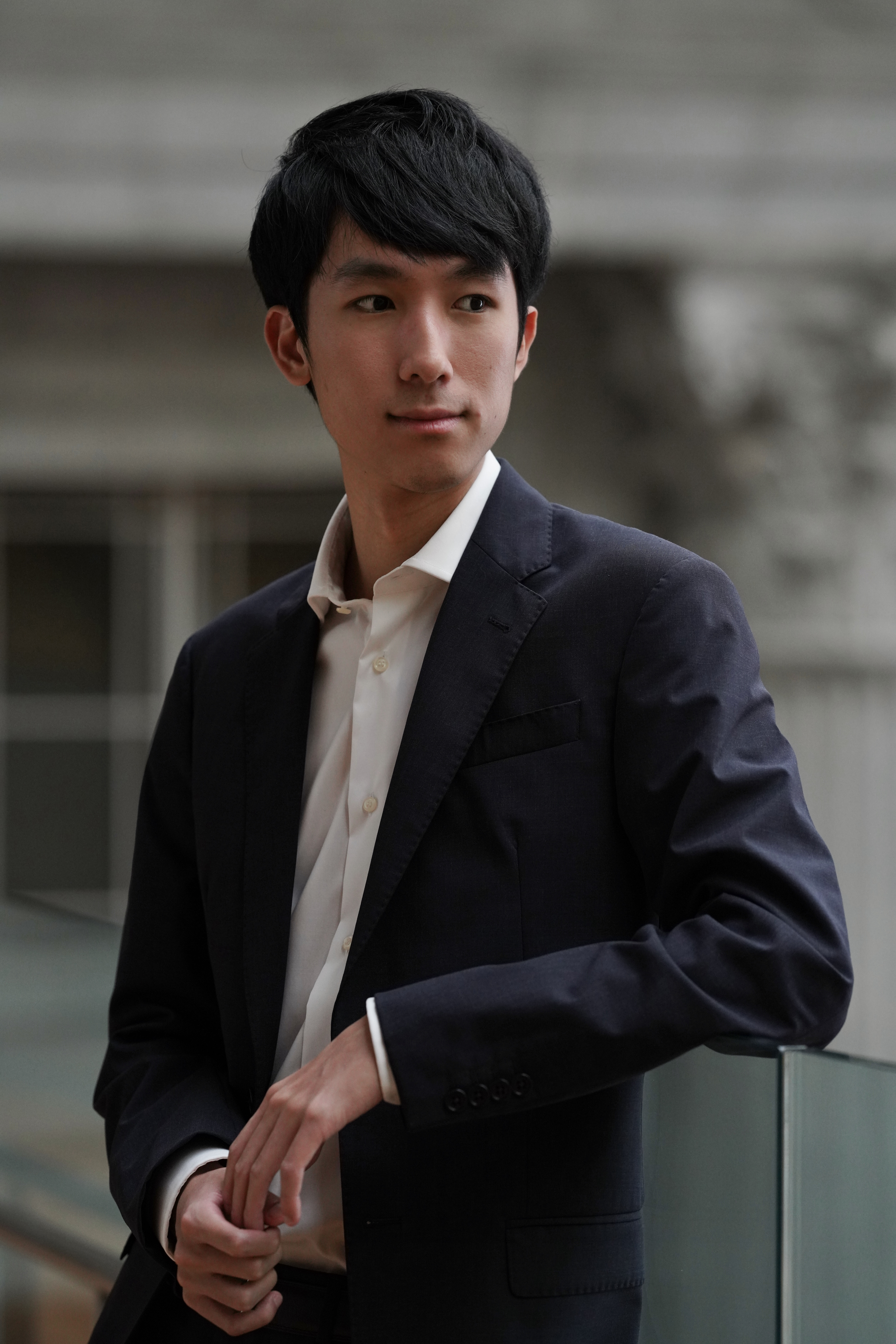
Eric Lu of the United States won the competition

The results of the competition were announced on the night of 20 October following lengthy deliberations by the jury. The first prize was awarded to Eric Lu of the United States, who had previously won fourth prize at the 2015 competition. The second prize was awarded to Kevin Chen of Canada, and the third prize to Zitong Wang of China. The fourth prize was shared ex aequo between Tianyao Lyu of China and Shiori Kuwahara of Japan. The fifth prize was also shared ex aequo between Piotr Alexewicz of Poland and Vincent Ong of Malaysia. The sixth prize was awarded to William Yang of the United States. The remaining three finalists received honourable mentions.

Prize		Winner	
1st place, gold medalist(s)	€60,000	Eric Lu	United States
2nd place, silver medalist(s)	€40,000	Kevin Chen	Canada
3rd place, bronze medalist(s)	€35,000	Zitong Wang	China
4th	€30,000	Tianyao Lyu	China
4th	€30,000	Shiori Kuwahara	Japan
5th	€25,000	Piotr Alexewicz	Poland
5th	€25,000	Vincent Ong	Malaysia
6th	€20,000	William Yang	United States
F	€8,000	David Khrikuli	Georgia
F	€8,000	Tianyou Li	China
F	€8,000	Miyu Shindo	Japan

In addition to the main prizes, several special prizes were awarded for outstanding performances of specific genres. Tianyao Lyu received the prize for the best performance of a concerto. The prize for mazurkas was awarded to Yehuda Prokopowicz, who was eliminated after the third stage. The polonaise prize went to finalist Tianyou Li, and the sonata prize to third-prize winner Zitong Wang. A new prize for the best performance of a ballade, founded by Dmitry Sitkovetsky in the name of Bella Davidovich, was awarded to Adam Kałduński, who was eliminated after the second stage.

Special prize		Founder	Winner	
Best Performance of a Ballade	€7,000	Bella Davidovich	Adam Kałduński	Poland
Best Performance of a Concerto	€7,000	Warsaw Philharmonic	Tianyao Lyu	China
Best Performance of Mazurkas	€7,000	Polish Radio	Yehuda Prokopowicz	Poland
Best Performance of a Polonaise	€7,000	Fryderyk Chopin Society	Tianyou Li	China
Best Performance of a Sonata	€10,000	Krystian Zimerman	Zitong Wang	China

The official Audience Award, determined by a public poll held during the final stage, was won by Piotr Alexewicz of Poland. Vincent Ong of Malaysia placed second in the poll and Tianyao Lyu of China third. In a separate poll conducted by Polskie Radio, listeners selected Piotr Pawlak of Poland as their favourite pianist. Tianyao Lyu of China and Shiori Kuwahara of Japan placed second and third, respectively.

== Results table ==
Competitor results
No	Competitor			P	Stage I 3–7 October		Stage II 9–12 October			Stage III 14–16 October			Final 18–20 October		
No	Name	Age	Country	P	Avg	→II	Avg	Cum	→III	Avg	Cum	→F	Avg	Cum	Result
39	Eric Lu	27	United States	F	21.82	Yes	23.03	22.67	Yes	23.29	23.09	Yes	21.41	22.43	1
6	Kevin Chen	20	Canada	S	22.93	Yes	22.41	22.57	Yes	22.36	22.43	Yes	21.58	22.15	2
66	Zitong Wang	26	China	K	21.03	Yes	20.69	20.79	Yes	22.80	22.20	Yes	20.64	21.45	3
28	Shiori Kuwahara	29	Japan	S	22.03	Yes	21.28	21.51	Yes	21.36	21.41	Yes	21.04	21.30	4
41	Tianyao Lyu	16	China	F	22.06	Yes	20.78	21.16	Yes	21.43	21.36	Yes	21.25	21.30	4
1	Piotr Alexewicz	25	Poland	K	21.02	Yes	21.08	21.06	Yes	20.74	20.84	Yes	21.30	21.03	5
50	Vincent Ong	24	Malaysia	K	22.07	Yes	21.23	21.48	Yes	20.55	20.84	Yes	21.04	21.01	5
76	William Yang	24	United States	S	20.22	Yes	22.38	21.73	Yes	20.69	20.98	Yes	20.48	20.91	6
24	David Khrikuli	24	Georgia	S	20.52	Yes	21.35	21.10	Yes	20.77	20.86	Yes	20.72	20.84	No
34	Tianyou Li	21	China	S	19.69	Yes	21.86	21.21	Yes	21.98	21.73	Yes	19.09	20.72	No
58	Miyu Shindo	23	Japan	S	21.92	Yes	20.82	21.15	Yes	21.06	21.10	Yes	19.72	20.63	No
30	Hyo Lee	18	South Korea	K	21.13	Yes	20.79	20.89	Yes	20.79	20.82	No			
64	Tomoharu Ushida	25	Japan	S	20.81	Yes	21.08	21.00	Yes	20.58	20.70	No			
31	Hyuk Lee	25	South Korea	S	21.13	Yes	20.79	20.89	Yes	20.03	20.29	No			
16	Yang (Jack) Gao	21	China	K	20.51	Yes	21.18	20.98	Yes	19.88	20.20	No			
72	Yifan Wu	16	China	S	21.47	Yes	20.32	20.67	Yes	19.80	20.07	No			
35	Xiaoxuan Li	23	China	S	20.88	Yes	20.30	20.47	Yes	19.85	20.04	No			
18	Eric Guo	23	Canada	S	22.78	Yes	20.32	21.06	Yes	19.54	20.02	No			
53	Yehuda Prokopowicz	19	Poland	S	20.73	Yes	20.36	20.47	Yes	19.49	19.79	No			
52	Piotr Pawlak	27	Poland	K	20.92	Yes	20.59	20.69	Yes	19.31	19.73	No			
55	Anthony Ratinov	27	United States	S	21.06	Yes	20.13	20.41	No						
60	Gabriele Strata	26	Italy	S	19.84	Yes	20.63	20.39	No						
23	Adam Kałduński	29	Poland	F	21.44	Yes	19.72	20.24	No						
5	Kai-Min Chang	24	Taiwan	S	19.59	Yes	20.52	20.24	No						
73	Miki Yamagata	23	Japan	K	19.61	Yes	20.35	20.13	No						
7	Xuehong Chen	25	China	S	20.40	Yes	19.90	20.05	No						
2	Jonas Aumiller	27	Germany	K	20.46	Yes	19.81	20.01	No						
46	Yumeka Nakagawa	23	Japan	K	19.78	Yes	19.98	19.92	No						
45	Nathalia Milstein	30	France	S	21.26	Yes	19.26	19.86	No						
54	Hao Rao	21	China	S	21.27	Yes	19.15	19.79	No						
8	Zixi Chen	23	China	K	20.25	Yes	19.29	19.58	No						
44	Ruben Micieli	28	Italy	S	20.61	Yes	19.12	19.57	No						
22	Zihan Jin	16	China	K	20.53	Yes	19.14	19.56	No						
40	Philipp Lynov	26	INP	S	21.00	Yes	18.71	19.40	No						
81	Jacky Zhang	17	United Kingdom	S	20.75	Yes	18.80	19.38	No						
36	Zhexiang Li	19	China	S	19.89	Yes	19.08	19.32	No						
3	Yanyan Bao	18	China	S	20.35	Yes	18.82	19.28	No						
12	Yubo Deng	23	China	S	19.72	Yes	19.09	19.28	No						
32	Kwanwook Lee	29	South Korea	Y	19.87	Yes	18.72	19.06	No						
20	Xiaoyu Hu	20	China	F	19.60	Yes	18.81	19.05	No						
42	Tiankun Ma	18	China	B	19.45	No									
9	Hoi Leong Cheong	25	China, Portugal	Y	19.39	No									
48	Việt Trung Nguyễn	29	Vietnam, Poland	F	19.37	No									
29	Shushi Kyomasu	29	Japan	Y	19.30	No									
57	Jun Shimada	20	Japan	Y	19.25	No									
13	Mateusz Dubiel	21	Poland	S	19.12	No									
27	Mateusz Krzyżowski	26	Poland	Y	19.03	No									
33	Luwangzi Li	17	China	K	19.03	No									
19	Wei-Ting Hsieh	29	Taiwan	S	19.02	No									
68	Andrzej Wierciński	29	Poland	S	19.02	No									
15	Alberto Ferro	29	Italy	Y	18.98	No									
26	Kaito Kobayashi	29	Japan	Y	18.96	No									
75	Fanze Yang	16	China	K	18.95	No									
59	Mana Shoji	28	Japan	K	18.93	No									
17	Shuguang Gong	27	China	S	18.91	No									
49	Yuya Nishimoto	23	Japan	K	18.84	No									
78	Yichen Yu	23	China	S	18.79	No									
10	Diana Cooper	28	France, United Kingdom	S	18.71	No									
71	Maiqi Wu	21	China	K	18.66	No									
83	Hanyuan Zhu	20	China	F	18.59	No									
43	Xuanyi Mao	29	China	S	18.56	No									
21	Hasan Ignatov	21	Bulgaria	S	18.51	No									
67	Jan Widlarz	23	Poland	K	18.50	No									
79	Yuewen Yu	24	China	K	18.46	No									
62	Ziye Tao	20	China	F	18.41	No									
69	Krzysztof Wierciński	22	Poland	S	18.40	No									
77	Yuanfan Yang	28	United Kingdom	F	18.38	No									
84	Jingting Zhu	23	China	S	18.33	No									
70	Victoria Wong	28	United States, Canada	Y	18.29	No									
61	Eva Strejcová	25	Czechia	Y	18.11	No									
4	Michał Basista	21	Poland	K	17.87	No									
11	Athena Deng	22	Canada	K	17.80	No									
80	Andrey Zenin	30	INP	K	17.78	No									
56	Zuzanna Sejbuk	20	Poland	F	17.72	No									
14	YuAng Fan	20	China	S	17.71	No									
25	Antoni Kłeczek	18	United States, Poland	S	17.64	No									
51	Arisa Onoda	29	Japan	S	17.63	No									
47	Yulia Nakashima	15	Japan, South Korea	B	17.56	No									
74	Ryota Yamazaki	26	Japan	S	17.54	No									
82	Yonghuan Zhong	20	China	S	17.33	No									
37	Hao-Wei Lin	21	Taiwan	S	17.22	No									
65	Ryan Wang	18	Canada	S	17.07	No									
63	Chun Lam U	23	Hong Kong	S	15.79	No									
38	Pedro López Salas	27	Spain	F	15.33	No									

== Timeline ==
=== Inaugural concert ===
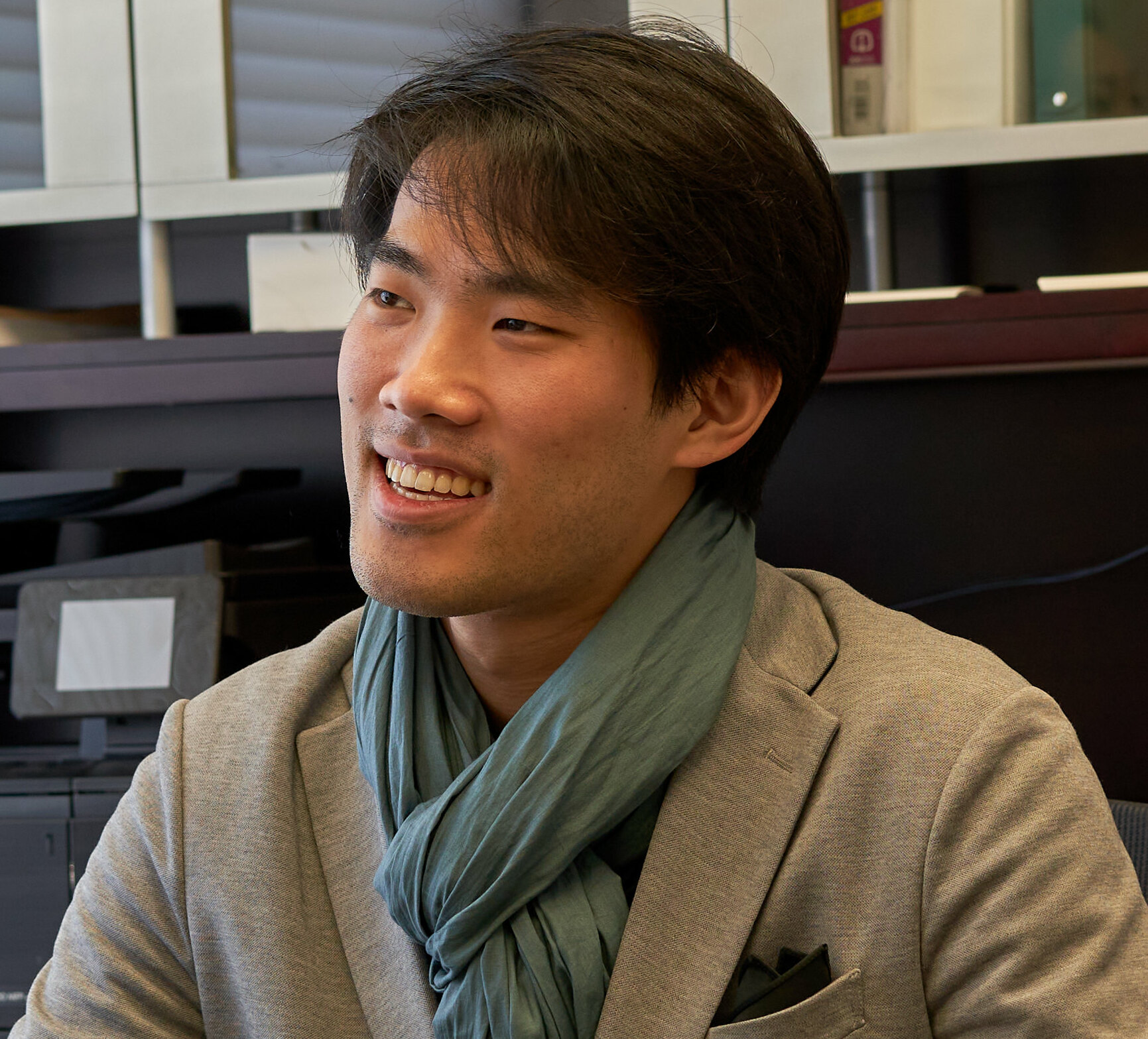
The 2021 winner, Bruce Liu, performed Saint-Saëns's Piano Concerto No. 5 at the inaugural concert.

The competition opened on 2 October with an inaugural concert by the Warsaw Philharmonic Orchestra under the direction of Andrey Boreyko. The program framed Chopin's music with works by composers connected to him: Johann Sebastian Bach, Camille Saint-Saëns, and Francis Poulenc. The concert began with Grzegorz Fitelberg's arrangement of Chopin's Polonaise in A major, Op. 40 No. 1 for orchestra. The 2021 winner, Bruce Liu, performed Saint-Saëns's Piano Concerto No. 5. Jurors Garrick Ohlsson (1970 winner) and Yulianna Avdeeva (2010 winner) performed Poulenc's Concerto for Two Pianos. The evening concluded with Liu, Ohlsson, and Avdeeva being joined by fellow juror and 1980 winner Đặng Thái Sơn for Bach's Concerto for Four Pianos, a performance music critic John Allison hailed as a "moment of pianistic history".

=== Stage I ===
Stage I of the competition took place from 3 to 7 October. Eighty-four pianists each performed a recital of approximately 30 minutes, which included a required étude, nocturne, waltz, and a large-scale work (a ballade, the Barcarolle, or the Fantaisie in F minor). Reviewers noted the challenge for the first participants in setting the standard for the competition, with Jakub Puchalski of the Chopin Courier observing that listeners' expectations are often shaped by recordings of past masters.

==== 3 October ====
On the first day, 3 October, Ryan Wang drew significant praise, with Jed Distler of Gramophone calling his performance the "most striking impression" of the day and a "masterclass in how to contour Chopin's polyphony". Puchalski also commended Wang for "convincingly gauging the drama" of his nocturne. Jan Widlarz was noted by multiple outlets; reviewers for Polskie Radio found his performance reliably and professionally prepared, though perhaps staying "within a safe zone", while Mateusz Ciupka of the Polish music magazine Ruch Muzyczny praised his "retro" style as a continuation of the "old, good Polish school of playing Chopin". Tomoharu Ushida was highlighted by Ciupka as a "pianist of perfect balance" in every musical aspect. Other notable performers included Miki Yamagata, praised by Distler for her "communicative energy", and Victoria Wong, who reviewers from both Gramophone and Polskie Radio noted gave a solid and well-prepared recital on her return to the competition.

==== 4 October ====
On the second day, 4 October, Kevin Chen received exceptional reviews, with Marcin Gmys of the Chopin Courier calling him "the greatest among them", highlighting his Fantaisie in F minor, and Distler describing his playing as "unambiguously transcendental virtuosity on every level". Gmys also identified him as one of the top contenders for the gold medal. At 17, Jacky Zhang impressed reviewers with his maturity; Distler praised his inventive voicings, Łucja Siedlik of the Chopin Courier noted he "breathed life into the music", and Polskie Radio commended his sense of timing. Yanyan Bao was described by Distler as a "rare breed" for her ability to project strong ideas, while Polskie Radio called her a "master of subtlety and poetic mood". Piotr Alexewicz also received positive notices for being in "stellar form", with Gmys later highlighting his "superbly constructed" Fantaisie and calling him a potential finalist.

==== 5 October ====
On 5 October, 16-year-old Zihan Jin was called "the real deal" and a "remarkable talent" by Distler for his "ravishingly contoured" playing. Eric Guo's interpretation was noted for its unique qualities; Distler found his playing "stimulating and refreshing", attributing his lean textures to experience with period instruments, while Anna Chęćka of Ruch Muzyczny praised his masterful use of piano resonance and polyphony. Gmys considered Guo a frontrunner aiming for a "Chopin Grand Slam" after his 2023 victory at the Chopin Competition on Period Instruments. Shiori Kuwahara's recital was hailed by Monika Pasiecznik of Ruch Muzyczny as the "culmination of the entire day," praising her monumental sound and a Ballade in F minor that synthesized her many strengths. Yang (Jack) Gao delivered what Distler called a "strong and memorable set" and Siedlik an "excellent, evenly balanced performance". Adam Kałduński was described as an individualist, with Pasiecznik noting his deep, personal tone and Chęćka praising his artistic maturity.

==== 6 October ====
On 6 October, established artist and returning prize-winner Eric Lu demonstrated what Distler called "formidable mastery". Both Gmys and Chęćka questioned his decision to return, calling it a risky move that could harm his established career. Sixteen-year-old Tianyao Lyu's performance was a highlight, with Gmys calling it a "near revelatory moment" and praising her "dazzling" 'Double Thirds' Etude. Chęćka described her as a "serious talent", while Distler found her Barcarolle "heartfelt, elegant and proportioned". Nathalia Milstein delivered one of the "most consistently satisfying presentations" of the first stage, according to Distler, and Ruben Micieli was praised for communicating the influence of bel canto on Chopin's music.

==== 7 October ====
On the final day of auditions, 7 October, the competition's youngest participant, 15-year-old Yulia Nakashima, delivered a performance where Klaudia Baranowska of the Chopin Courier noted her "impressive technical prowess", and Distler pointed to her "remarkable command" and natural musicality. Yehuda Prokopowicz was praised by Baranowska for his "refined, poetical sound" and "huge artistic potential", while Distler found his Fantasy reminiscent of "Van Cliburn in his prime". Anthony Ratinov's performance was noted by Distler for its "sharpened focus", and by Dorota Szwarcman of the Chopin Courier for excelling in technique and structure. Gabriele Strata was described as a strong personality with a narrative style, with Ciupka comparing his powerful bass sound to that of an "organist in the guise of a pianist". Returning finalist Hao Rao was seen to have matured since the 2021 competition.

==== Results ====
Following the conclusion of Stage I, the jury announced that 40 participants would advance to the second stage. The results were met with some surprise, with Gmys noting the "very strong" impression that the competition was "ruled by chance" due to the elimination of strong contenders such as Mateusz Dubiel, Wei-Ting Hsieh, and Yulia Nakashima. The Polish representation was reduced from 13 to four, while pianists from China formed a significant contingent, with 14 of the 29 Chinese participants advancing.

=== Stage II ===
Stage II of the competition took place from 9 to 12 October. Participants were required to perform a recital of 40 to 50 minutes, which had to include one of several specified polonaises and a group of six consecutive preludes from Op. 28, with the option to perform the entire cycle.

==== 9 October ====
On the first day, 9 October, Kevin Chen's performance of the complete Études, Op. 10, a first for the competition, drew significant attention. Gmys wrote that the audience was "watching history unfold live", and commentators for Polskie Radio compared his technical and expressive command favorably to that of Bruce Liu and Yunchan Lim. Mateusz Ciupka of Ruch Muzyczny noted his performance, "devoid of technical limitations," allowed the works to shine as musically rich miniatures. Distler noted Chen's "superhuman virtuoso display" but questioned if the music was sometimes lost "underneath the stunt". Yanyan Bao received universal acclaim; Distler called her "humanly super" and praised her for conveying "maturity beyond her 18 years", while Klaudia Baranowska of the Chopin Courier found her a "pianist of great artistic maturity, and deep sensitivity". Polskie Radio commentators were "delighted" by her playing, noting her "sparks of imagination". Yang Gao's performance of the complete Op. 28 Preludes was praised by Distler as "consistently satisfying", while Gmys noted that "ideas danced off every page". Piotr Alexewicz's interpretation of the same cycle drew divided responses: Distler was "largely disappointed", whereas Baranowska praised his "more personal and thoughtful vision" and Ciupka highlighted its "cohesive and dark" quality. Polskie Radio also deemed his performance successful. Jonas Aumiller was noted for his "thoughtful, intellectual approach" to programming and what Distler called his "reserved Classicism", though reviewers for Polskie Radio found his Polonaise in F-sharp minor lacked an "oneiric" quality. Zixi Chen was lauded by Distler for his "dazzling fireworks display" in the Rondo in C minor, which Gmys also found "refreshing".

==== 10 October ====
On the second day, 10 October, the morning session was met with reservations from reviewers; commentators for Polskie Radio described it as a "great series of doubts", and Dorota Szwarcman of the Chopin Courier felt the Preludes performances did not reach the level of the previous day. Despite this, individual pianists drew praise. Eric Guo was commended for his mazurkas, with Distler writing that they "truly 'mazurked'". Distler also noted David Khrikuli's improvisatory style and Adam Kałduński's "thoughtful, unhurried interpretations". The evening session featured a standout performance by Shiori Kuwahara, whom Distler described as demonstrating "big, Romantic pianism" and whose A-flat Polonaise he felt Arthur Rubinstein "would have been proud" of. Puchalski also credited her with one of the competition's finest interpretations of the Barcarolle. Tianyou Li was called the "pleasant surprise of the day" by Polskie Radio for his performance of the Sonata No. 1. Returning competitor Hyuk Lee was seen by Puchalski to have matured since 2021, and Krzysztof Stefański of Ruch Muzyczny praised his lyrical and dramatic performance, positioning him as a podium contender. Distler, however, maintained his earlier opinion that Lee's playing, while technically proficient, "doesn't ever surprise you".

==== 11 October ====
On 11 October, returning prize-winner Eric Lu received mixed reviews for his performance of the "Funeral March" Sonata. Distler praised his "utterly mesmerising" third movement but found other parts "sectionalised", commentators for Polskie Radio questioned his program choices and felt he had not recaptured the "subtle poet" quality of his 2015 performance, and Gmys described his sonata as "heavy and indigestible". In contrast, Nathalia Milstein received strong praise for her complete Preludes cycle, with Puchalski noting her traditional approach and clear pedaling, and Distler admiring the "transparency and sinew" of her playing. Ciupka highlighted her ironic and unconventional interpretations. Distler also called Ruben Micieli's performance a "glorious concert", while Ciupka noted his construction of a "highly personal, funereal requiem" from Chopin's works. Zhexiang Li delivered what Distler described as "one virtuoso knockout after another", including a "demonic" Scherzo No. 3. Tianyao Lyu impressed Szwarcman with her "impeccable technique, humour and charisma", while Xiaoxuan Li's Preludes were described by Distler as "jewels". Other notable performances included that of Piotr Pawlak, whose Allegro de concert was described as "symphonic" by Polskie Radio, and Yumeka Nakagawa and Vincent Ong, who both received positive notices for their renditions of the complete Preludes cycle.

==== 12 October ====
On the final day of Stage II, 12 October, William Yang gave a performance that Distler felt "obliterated whatever reservations" he had from the first stage, praising his interpretation as one that "avoids clichés, while embracing the modern piano's sonic and expressive potential". Pasiecznik hailed his unique and consistent vision, stating that he revealed a "new, separate Chopin" to the listener. Chęćka later categorized his style as "Apollonian", describing him as a "humble virtuoso" whose restrained approach created a "profound beauty". Gabriele Strata's recital was highlighted by Baranowska as "one of the most moving moments in the morning session", with a performance of the rarely-heard Boléro that combined "rhythmic precision with engaging freedom". Distler also praised Strata's "fusion of meticulous workmanship, recreative fantasy and obsession with beautiful sound", likening it to that of Ivan Moravec. Yehuda Prokopowicz was lauded for his "poetic" playing and "original" interpretations by Polskie Radio, and Baranowska was particularly impressed by his "well-conceived" performance of the Op. 17 Mazurkas. Zitong Wang garnered attention for her eclectic program and what Gmys called a "courageous" and sensitive interpretation, while Tomoharu Ushida was noted for his "splendid playing, with lovely tone".

==== Results ====
Following the conclusion of Stage II, the jury announced that 20 participants would advance to the third stage. Distler expressed regret over the elimination of Yanyan Bao and Gabriele Strata, but noted that David Khrikuli, William Yang, and Vincent Ong had showcased themselves to "far better advantage" in the second stage, likely factoring into their advancement. Chęćka suggested that Khrikuli's advancement signaled the jury's openness to more "Dionysian", or controversial, performers, while Gmys highlighted Piotr Pawlak's success with the rarely played Allegro de concert and Tianyao Lyu's "gigantic talent". Gmys concluded by observing that no modern competitor attempted to emulate the style of "golden era" masters like Rachmaninoff or Rubinstein, a trend he attributed to the pragmatic expectations of modern juries.

=== Stage III ===
Stage III of the competition took place from 14 to 16 October. The 20 remaining participants were required to perform a recital of 45 to 55 minutes, which had to include one of Chopin's two mature piano sonatas (Op. 35 or Op. 58) and a complete opus of mazurkas. Reviewers noted that the sonatas, in particular, proved to be a significant hurdle for many participants, with Mateusz Ciupka of Ruch Muzyczny observing that several acclaimed pianists struggled with the technical and structural demands of the large-scale works.

==== 14 October ====
On the first day, 14 October, Yang Gao opened the stage with a performance Distler described as "world-class perfection", while commentators for Polskie Radio noted that he "operated more with color than tempo". Eric Guo was called the "most intriguing and complete interpretation of the session" by Puchalski, with Distler praising his "eloquent" and "poetic" playing, particularly in the mazurkas. David Khrikuli's performance was hailed by Polskie Radio as a historic moment: "We were witnesses to something great. Something like this happens... once every few Competitions". Distler also praised his sonata, likening its "mastery of timescale" to that of Emil Gilels, while Stefański noted he excelled in capturing both the "ludic and salon" qualities of the mazurkas. Shiori Kuwahara drew conflicting reviews; Dorota Szwarcman of the Chopin Courier called her "a name to reckon with", and Distler praised her "healthy and generous" interpretations, but Polskie Radio found her playing "forceful" and her mazurkas "one-dimensional". Chęćka later identified her as an "ideal candidate for gold", an artist whose playing "transcends stereotypes". Tianyou Li was a "surprise" for Szwarcman, who called his sonata the "most expressive of the evening" and his Variations, Op. 2, "no less captivating than Bruce Liu's". Hyo Lee and Hyuk Lee both delivered what Szwarcman deemed "excellent performances", though Distler gave a more critical assessment, calling Hyo's recital "uneven" and Hyuk's sonata a "blunt and blustering non-event".

==== 15 October ====
On 15 October, the day's schedule was altered after Eric Lu postponed his performance due to illness. Xiaoxuan Li was praised by Baranowska for the "lyricism and sound sensitivity" of his mazurkas, while Distler noted his gifts as a "tone painter", though he found Li's expressive gestures "somewhat deflated the music's continuity" in the sonata. Polskie Radio commentators also described him as a "cultured, refined pianist" of "great restraint". The 16-year-old Tianyao Lyu's performance elicited differing responses; Baranowska praised her "astonishing" maturity and a "consistently developed, suspenseful narrative" in the sonata, while Chęćka found the performance a moving experience, describing Lyu as a "messenger of musical mystery" and her choice to end with the Berceuse after the sonata's darkness as a profound "gesture of comfort". Distler and commentators for Polskie Radio, however, felt Lyu's interpretation was not yet fully personalized, with the latter noting she had trouble "getting out of a certain corset that she was constrained by". Vincent Ong's recital sharply divided critics. Puchalski called his sonata a "revelation" that "unfolded through stark contrasts", whereas commentators for Polskie Radio were highly critical, calling his playing "mechanical" and questioning the jury's decision to advance him. Distler also found his performance of the Variations, Op. 2 "proficient yet characterless". Yehuda Prokopowicz was praised by Polskie Radio for his "excellent feel for the mazurka idiom" and "great intelligence", though Distler noted that "myriad mishaps" in the sonata threw him "off his game". Miyu Shindo's performance also drew varied commentary; Puchalski wrote that she gave a "deeply emotional account" of her sonata and Ciupka praised her self-control, while Distler found her interpretations "conventional to the point of anonymity", though he acknowledged that "a true personality emerges" when she prioritizes musicality. The day concluded with a widely praised performance by Piotr Pawlak. Distler awarded him a "'third time's the charm' award", highlighting his "dazzling virtuosity" in the rarely-heard Rondo à la Krakowiak and his "altogether more idiomatic" mazurkas. Puchalski noted his "literal" approach created "structural cohesion and order", while Polskie Radio also lauded his "electrifying" performance of the Rondo.

==== 16 October ====
On the final day of Stage III, 16 October, Tomoharu Ushida opened the day with a performance described by commentators for Polskie Radio as technically "almost flawless", though Distler found it "loud and undifferentiated". Zitong Wang's recital drew polarized reviews; Baranowska called her "one of the most captivating personalities" of the competition with an "exquisitely considered vision", and both Stefański and Chęćka praised her excellent mazurkas, while Distler was critical of her tone, finding it "hollow and aggressive" despite a "shimmering and ghostly" finale to her sonata. Yifan Wu, one of the youngest participants, was noted by Distler for delivering one of the competition's top performances of the Ballade No. 2, though Polskie Radio felt his sonata performance revealed his "emotional immaturity". William Yang received universal acclaim for what Distler called a display of "astonishing brilliance and arresting originality". Gmys described him as one of the "most striking eccentrics" with "dazzling virtuosity", with Chęćka noting his playing was an "embodiment of Chopin's principle of simplicity" and marking him as a potential winner. Polskie Radio commentators hailed it as "one of the best performances of Stage III". Piotr Alexewicz delivered what Distler considered his "best playing... so far", with mazurkas played as if he was "inventing the music on the spot", though Gmys felt the recital had "occasional blemishes" and Stefański pointed to issues with "inaccuracy in the realization of the text". Kevin Chen's technically accomplished performance was viewed differently by critics. Stefański declared that Chen "keeps the competition at a distance", and Gmys saw him as a contender for multiple special prizes, while Distler praised his "restraint and mindful music-making". Commentators for Polskie Radio, however, felt a "sense of slight disappointment", finding the interpretation lacked a personal connection to the music. Returning after his illness, Eric Lu gave a performance that divided reviewers. Distler lauded his "technical mastery, rainbow of colours and poetic ardour", calling his rendition of the Op. 56 Mazurkas among the competition's finest. Polskie Radio commentators were split, with one hailing "the return of the poet" while another found it "mannered" and "calculated".

==== Results ====
Following the conclusion of Stage III, the jury announced that 11 participants would advance to the final. Distler expressed gladness at the selection of Shiori Kuwahara, David Khrikuli, and William Yang, but was "greatly disappointed" by the elimination of Yang Gao, whom he considered to have delivered the "most consistently satisfying, probing and committed" interpretations in every round. Commentators for Polskie Radio considered the eliminations of Eric Guo and Hyuk Lee to be the biggest surprises, and noted that unlike in previous competitions, no clear frontrunner had emerged for the title. Chęćka speculated that the jury's selections promoted pianists who blended "aristocratic nobility and the purest musicality".

=== Final ===
The final round took place from 18 to 20 October. Each finalist was required to perform the Polonaise-Fantaisie, Op. 61, followed by one of Chopin's two piano concertos with the Warsaw Philharmonic Orchestra conducted by Andrey Boreyko. Seven finalists opted to perform the Piano Concerto No. 1 in E minor and four chose the Piano Concerto No. 2 in F minor. Monika Pasiecznik of Ruch Muzyczny noted that the inclusion of the Polonaise-Fantaisie, a work of significant interpretative difficulty, raised the threshold for the finalists.

==== 18 October ====
On the first day of the final, 18 October, Tianyou Li's performance received a reserved assessment from Distler, who found his Polonaise-Fantaisie played "carefully and shapelessly" and his Concerto in E minor dogged by a "lack of character and contrast". Pasiecznik characterized Li's playing as technically impeccable yet interpretively safe, resulting in a performance of the concerto that she found exceptionally classical and even Mozartian in character.

Returning prize-winner Eric Lu offered a Concerto in F minor that Puchalski called a "firmly articulated and meticulously shaped vision", and a Polonaise-Fantaisie he deemed the "most coherently" prepared of the evening. Pasiecznik also noted Lu played "more personally and gives himself over to emotions", finding a "touch of madness" in the Polonaise-Fantaisie's finale and praising his concerto for combining melancholy with an attention to detail. Distler noted Lu's "tonal magic" in the Polonaise-Fantaisie, but felt it "lacked rhythmic backbone" and that the concerto's rondo "never managed to dance".

Tianyao Lyu's performance of the Concerto in E minor was deemed the highlight. Distler wrote that only Lyu "brought this concerto to life tonight, with consistent sparkle and rhythmic point in every phrase", praising her interaction with the orchestra. Commentators for Polskie Radio agreed, with Róża Światczyńska stating that "it was precisely the concerto part in which her talent blossomed in all its glory" and that the piece was "as if written by Chopin especially for her". Pasiecznik praised Lyu's understanding of the "Chopin idiom", highlighting the "clear reminiscences of dance" in her Polonaise-Fantaisie and a concerto that impressed with its "youthful energy", in which "delicacy was juxtaposed with an eruption of temperament". Puchalski added that Lyu reminded the audience of what Chopin's concertos truly are: "youthful works of spontaneous inspiration, brilliant in the most natural way, songful and radiant".

The day concluded with Vincent Ong, whose recital drew varied responses. Puchalski praised his Concerto in E minor for its "maturity" and "palette of mysterious colours", writing that in terms of emotional depth, the concerto's Romanza "surely belonged to the Malaysian pianist". Distler, however, found Ong's concerto lacking in contrast, though he credited the pianist as an "idea man" who held his attention in a "dynamically contrasted" Polonaise-Fantaisie. Pasiecznik found Ong's Polonaise-Fantaisie "rather peculiar" and "essentially devoid of dance character", but was intrigued by his "undoubted musicality" in the concerto; she noted that while his use of large contrasts and sudden crescendos harmed the music's fluidity, it imbued the performance with a "particular energy" and a "distinct style".

==== 19 October ====
On the second day, 19 October, Miyu Shindo was praised by Jessica Duchen of the Chopin Courier for her Polonaise-Fantaisie, which had a "powerful sense of atmosphere", and by Distler as the "finest and most authentic playing" he had heard from her in the competition. Her Concerto in E minor, however, was seen by Distler as showcasing "the competitor over the artist", while commentators for Polskie Radio found her cantilena lacked the "fluidity and free-flowing nature" required for the style brillant. Ciupka also found her performance disappointing, calling the Polonaise-Fantaisie a "cycle of unrelated episodes" divided by "mannered rubatos", and felt her concerto wavered between Tchaikovskian pathos and impressionistic explorations, culminating in a frustrating finale.

Zitong Wang's recital received a mixed reception. Her Polonaise-Fantaisie began with what Distler called "a few technical stumbles and highly exposed wrong chords", and commentators for Polskie Radio felt it was a "bad day" for her. Despite this, Duchen praised her for showing "much mature musicianship" and creating a "rapt intensity" that helped the complex work feel "almost like an improvisation", and Ciupka noted that despite memory slips in the Polonaise-Fantaisie, her concerto had "a lot of light and warmth" in place of brillante displays, particularly praising the final rondo as a "celebration of a jaunty krakowiak" with beautifully differentiated articulation. Distler found her most convincing playing came in the concerto's slow movement, where her phrasing "reclaimed the fluidity and eloquence of her finest work", while Andrzej Sułek of Polskie Radio admired her "true, sincere personality".

William Yang's performance drew exceptional praise, with Distler declaring him "a genius" and "in a class by himself" for an interpretation that "eschews received opinion". Ciupka considered him the "greatest phenomenon of this Competition", praising his "flawless" execution and "most coherent interpretation" of the Polonaise-Fantaisie, which he achieved through a style of "feigned improvisation" that rejected sentimentality in favour of creating larger rhetorical wholes. Duchen lauded his Polonaise-Fantaisie, which she considered the "finest" of the competition so far, noting that he "shaped it unerringly", and described his Concerto in F minor as a "blend of filigree delicacy" and "great clarity" with "a completely assured personal concept". In a contrasting assessment, commentators for Polskie Radio felt his performance was "withdrawn" and that in the concerto he was "hidden somewhere behind the orchestra".

The final performer, Piotr Alexewicz, was described by Duchen as an "extrovert player" who "took ownership of the Polonaise-Fantasy in the very first notes". Ciupka contrasted his "extroverted" style, characterized by broad, narrative, and at times Brahmsian phrasing with a "meaty, dark bass", with Yang's introversion, comparing their respective sounds to those of Emil Gilels and Keith Jarrett, though he also noted Alexewicz had "significant stumbles" at the end of the concerto's rondo. Commentators for Polskie Radio hailed him as a "thoroughbred pianist and virtuoso who is not afraid of the orchestra", while Distler noted his "vibrant dynamic contrasts" and "hearty sense of narrative", though he felt the outer movements of the Concerto in F minor "lacked variety in articulation".

==== 20 October ====
On the final day of the competition, 20 October, Shiori Kuwahara's Polonaise-Fantaisie was described by Distler as "full-bodied and amply inflected", while Gmys found it "restrained" but with an "excellent command of the keyboard". Her Concerto in E minor was highly praised by Distler, who wrote that it "sang its heart out in every bar" and was played by "a young pianist with an old soul and a generous sound". Stefański also noted her strength in building dramaturgy, describing a "turbulent" Polonaise-Fantaisie with a deep, sonorous tone, but felt this powerful, earthbound approach deprived the concerto's final krakowiak of lightness, resulting in a few stumbles.

David Khrikuli's performance drew polarized reviews. Gmys called his Polonaise-Fantaisie "exuberant" and his Concerto in F minor a "serious rival" to William Yang's, noting that he "intoned the dramatic recitativo of the Larghetto superbly". Stefański praised him as one of the competition's "most original participants", who successfully combined brillant playing with "strong emotion" and delivered a "jaunty" and "spirited" finale, though he also cautioned that the pianist's "nonchalant" approach sometimes proved "treacherous". Distler found he "drove through the Polonaise-Fantaisie with detached impatience" and that his concerto's "ultra-polished finger work" produced "two-dimensional, undifferentiated results".

The final performance by Kevin Chen was met with surprise. Gmys praised his Polonaise-Fantaisie as "philosophically attuned", with Chen "sculpting silence with exquisite finesse". His interpretation of the Concerto in E minor, however, was described by Gmys as a potential "disappointment" for many, with "moderate, even conservative, tempi" that foregrounded the work's "lyrical qualities" but lacked "youthful verve". Gmys suggested it was a deliberate artistic choice, an "unaffected abdication" from a purely virtuosic display. Stefański wrote that Chen's performance countered perceptions of him as an "emotionless technician", praising the "natural" Larghetto where the pianist "almost breathed with the orchestra" and noting that his technical skill allowed him to shade even the most virtuosic passages, but speculated that minor slips and a "slightly weaker disposition" on the night may have cost him the gold medal. Distler gave a harsher assessment, calling the concerto a "heavy, four-square and charmless" performance that "seemed to go on forever".

==== Results ====
The jury announced the results after a lengthy period of deliberation. American pianist Eric Lu was awarded the first prize, a notable achievement as he had placed fourth in the 2015 competition. Kevin Chen of Canada was awarded the second prize, and Zitong Wang of China the third. Fourth prize was shared by Tianyao Lyu and Shiori Kuwahara, while fifth prize was shared by Piotr Alexewicz and Vincent Ong. William Yang was awarded sixth prize.

The jury's verdict was met with surprise by several commentators. Marcin Majchrowski of Polskie Radio called the result a "considerable surprise for observers and commentators", noting that unlike in the previous two competitions, no clear frontrunner had emerged. Sułek commented on the field being "so even and at the same time so incomplete in terms of a certain ideal... expected from the first prize winner" that he would have found it "fair and appropriate" if no first prize had been awarded. Światczyńska also expressed doubts, noting the difficulty she would have in selecting highlights from the winner's performances for a traditional laureate album. Distler wrote that he "would not have predicted Eric Lu's first prize, nor Kevin Chen placing second", though he acknowledged their "virtuosic prowess and sheer finesse". Distler also expressed surprise at Wang's third prize, felt that Yang "deserved better", and questioned why David Khrikuli did not place given his "overall strength in the solo rounds". Majchrowski voiced similar regret for Khrikuli, who "ignited my imagination in Stage III", and felt that Shiori Kuwahara "shone the most" in the final. He also pointed to comments from jury chairman Garrick Ohlsson about "difficult discussions" and "long deliberations", suggesting a challenging decision-making process.

Stefański noted Lu's victory was like a "film script" after his illness in Stage III, and pointed to the dispersal of special prizes (including to non-finalists Adam Kałduński and Yehuda Prokopowicz) as evidence of the jury's difficult decisions. Gmys categorized the finalists into two interpretive camps based on M. H. Abrams's literary theory: "mirrors", who faithfully reflect the score (Chen, Kuwahara, Lu), and "lamps", who illuminate it with their own personality (Alexewicz, Khrikuli, Wang, Yang). Gmys also addressed public accusations that the competition was biased towards pianists from the Far East, refuting them as a "conspiracy" and attributing the success of these musicians to the constantly rising level of pianism in the region, a trend visible at international competitions worldwide, concluding that the final results were not a "scandal", as "in the face of such a balanced field, someone had to be eliminated".

== Jury ==
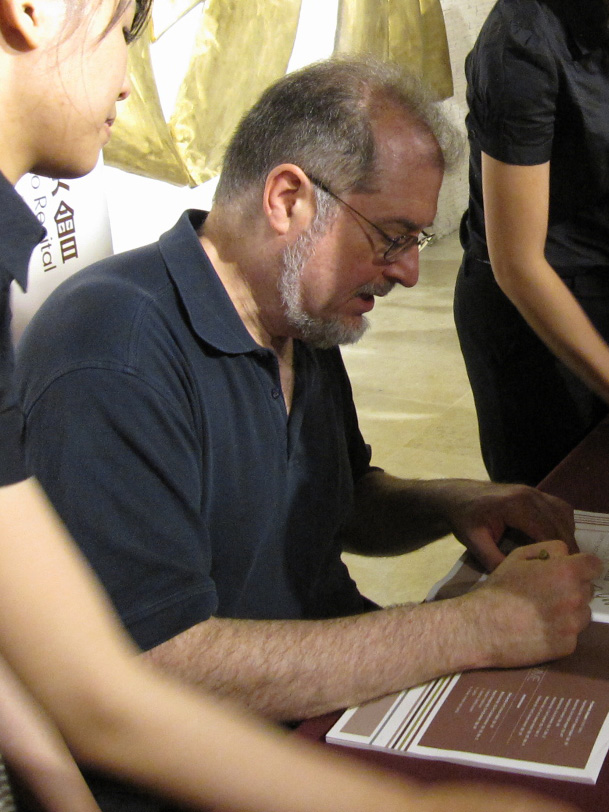
American pianist Garrick Ohlsson, chairman of the jury

The jury was composed of prominent pianists, pedagogues, and past winners of the competition. For the first time, the jury was chaired by a non-Polish musician, the American pianist and 1970 winner Garrick Ohlsson. According to Director Artur Szklener, Ohlsson was selected for his deep analytical approach to music, which combines artistic interpretation with scholarly reflection, with the hope that his leadership would bring a new perspective to the evaluation of Chopin's works.

=== Competition jury ===
The competition jury consisted of:

- (South Africa) John Allison
- (Russia) Yulianna Avdeeva ( (gold) XVI)
- (France) Michel Beroff
- (Japan) Akiko Ebi (5th X)
- (China) Sa Chen (4th XIV)
- (Vietnam) (Canada) Đặng Thái Sơn ( (gold) X)
- (Argentina) Nelson Goerner (HM XIII)
- (Japan) Momo Kodama
- (Poland) Krzysztof Jabłoński ( (bronze) XI)
- (United States) Kevin Kenner ( (silver) XII)
- (United States) Robert McDonald
- (United States) Garrick Ohlsson (chairman; (gold) VIII)
- (Poland) Piotr Paleczny ( (bronze) VIII)
- (Poland) Ewa Pobłocka (5th X)
- (Poland) Katarzyna Popowa-Zydroń (HM IX)
- (United States) John Rink
- (Poland) Wojciech Świtała (HM XII)

=== Preliminary jury ===
The preliminary jury consisted of:

- (Bulgaria) Ludmil Angelov
- (Russia) Nikolai Demidenko
- (Poland) Krzysztof Jabłoński
- (United States) Kevin Kenner
- (France) Marc Laforêt
- (Italy) Alberto Nosè
- (Poland) Piotr Paleczny (chairman)
- (Poland) Ewa Pobłocka
- (Poland) Katarzyna Popowa-Zydroń
- (Poland) Wojciech Świtała

=== Voting procedure ===
Jury members gave each performance 1 to 25 points, with the following rating categories: Perfect (25), Exceptional (23–24), Very good (18–22), Good (16–17), Average (12–15), Below average (6–11), and Poor (1–5). Jury members did not evaluate their own students, defined as participants who had studied with them regularly for more than six months since the 2021 competition or with whom they had a relationship that could affect impartial judgment. To ensure fairness, scores were adjusted using the Correction to the Mean (CMEAN) method: if any juror's score deviated from a contestant's mean by more than 3 points in round one or 2 points in subsequent rounds, it was adjusted to the nearest boundary value. It has been argued that this approach can introduce ranking inconsistencies, reverse jurors' original preferences, and is susceptible to manipulation; the Jurors' Scores Transposition (JST) method, used in several international competitions including the 2025 National Chopin Competition in Miami, has been proposed as an alternative, which normalizes scores by ensuring each juror's set of scores has the same mean and spread, thereby preserving their original rankings and preferences.

Cumulative scores were calculated using different weightings for each stage. After round two, scores were weighted 30% for round one and 70% for round two. After round three, the weighting shifted to 10% for round one, 20% for round two, and 70% for round three. Final scores combined all four stages: 10% round one, 20% round two, 35% round three, and 35% for the final. In principle, no more than 40 participants would advance to round two, 20 to round three, and 10 to the final. After the final performances, the jury chairman proposed a verdict on prize awards, which required approval by at least two-thirds of the jury. The jury could adjust the final ranking by up to one position from the cumulative scores (or two positions with three-quarters approval), and could also modify the distribution of prizes.

For special prizes, each jury member submitted a list of three participants (worth 3, 2, and 1 points respectively), and the prize was awarded to the participant with the highest total, provided they received at least twice as many points as there were voting jury members. If no participant reached this threshold or there was a tie, the chairman would conduct a vote requiring an absolute majority; if this failed, the special prize would not be awarded.
