= Jan Widlarz =

Polish pianist (born 2002)

- Born: 24 June 2002 (age 23); Warsaw
- Citizenship: Polish
- Occupation: pianist

Jan Widlarz (born 24 June 2002) is a Polish pianist.

== Biography ==
He comes from a musical family; his mother took up a job as a music teacher. He studied at the Karol Szymanowski State Music School Complex No. 4 in Warsaw under the supervision of Irina Rumiancewa-Dabrowski. He then began his studies at the Feliks Nowowiejski Music Academy in Bydgoszcz under the supervision of Katarzyna Popowa-Zydroń and Paweł Wakarecy.

As a soloist, he played with the Polish Radio Symphony Orchestra and the Świętokrzyska Philharmonic Orchestra. He has given concerts, among others, at the birthplace of Frédéric Chopin in Żelazowa Wola, the Fryderyk Chopin Museum in Warsaw, the Polish National Radio Symphony Orchestra in Katowice and in Hokkaido.

He received 2nd place in the International Béla Bartók Piano Competition (2010), 1st place in the Warsaw Piano Competition (2011), 1st place in the “Master of the Keyboard” Competition in Warsaw (2011), 1st place in the Bach Competition in Warsaw (2012), 3rd place in the National CEA Auditions (2013), 1st place in the International Janina Garścia Competition in Stalowa Wola (2014), 1st place in the “From Bach to Szymanowski” Competition in Warsaw (2015).

He received 2nd prize in the Roma International Piano Competition (2016), 3rd prize in the "Master of the Keyboard" Competition in Warsaw (2017), 3rd prize in the M. Moszkowski International Competition in Kielce (2017), 3rd prize in the International Piano Competition in Augustów (2018), 1st prize of the K. and A. Szafranek National Forum of Young Instrumentalists in Rybnik (2018), 3rd prize in the J. Brahms International Chamber Music Competition in Gdańsk and Second Prize and the Award of the Rector of the Academy of Music in Łódź for the best performance of a classical sonata at the Władysław Kędra National Piano Competition in Łódź (2018). In 2018 he received the scholarship of the Minister of Culture and Art. In 2024 he was a finalist at the 12th Hamatsu International Piano Competition.

In 2024 he received medal of honor at the 69th Maria Canals International Music Competition in Barcelona. In 2025 he participated in the XIX International Chopin Piano Competition, in which he performed on 3 October 2025.
