= Tianyao Lyu =

Chinese classical pianist (born 2008)

- 呂天瑤
- Lyu in Żelazowa Wola, Poland, in June 2026
- Born: 21 October 2008 (age 18); China
- Occupation: Classical pianist
- Awards: Fourth Prize, XIX International Chopin Piano Competition (2025); Warsaw Philharmonic Prize for Best Performance of a Concerto (2025)
- Musical career
- Genre: Classical
- Instrument: Piano
- Label: Decca Classics

Chinese name
- Traditional Chinese: 呂天瑤
- Simplified Chinese: 吕天瑶
Transcriptions
Standard Mandarin
- Hanyu Pinyin: Lǚ Tiānyáo
- Website: www.tianyaolyu-piano.com

Tianyao Lyu (Chinese: 呂天瑤; pinyin: Lǚ Tiānyáo; born 21 October 2008) is a Chinese classical pianist. She received fourth prize at the XIX International Chopin Piano Competition in Warsaw in 2025, as well as the Warsaw Philharmonic Prize for the best performance of a concerto.

At the Academy of Music in Poznań, where she was the youngest student, Lyu was jokingly given the Polish nickname Marysia. She has used the nickname when introducing herself in Polish media.

== Early life and education ==
Lyu was born in China in 2008. She studied at the school affiliated with the Central Conservatory of Music in Beijing, where she was taught by Chang Hua. In 2025, she was studying under Katarzyna Popowa-Zydroń at the Academy of Music in Poznań.

== Career ==
Lyu has performed with the Salzburg Chamber Soloists and the Ningbo Symphony Orchestra, and has appeared at Carnegie Hall in New York City and the National Centre for the Performing Arts in Beijing.

In 2024, she won first prize at the 19th Ettlingen International Piano Competition in Germany and first prize and the Grand Prix at the 31st International Fryderyk Chopin Piano Competition for Children and Youth in Szafarnia, Poland.

In October 2025, she received fourth prize at the XIX International Chopin Piano Competition in Warsaw, along with the Warsaw Philharmonic Prize for the best performance of a concerto.

In May 2026, Lyu performed with Gidon Kremer and Kremerata Baltica at the Fondation Louis Vuitton in Paris. The following month, she signed an exclusive multi-album recording agreement with Decca Classics.

In August 2026, she toured Japan, performing both of Chopin's piano concertos and giving a solo recital at Suntory Hall in Tokyo. Later that year, she performed with the Warsaw Philharmonic Orchestra under Krzysztof Urbański and The Hallé under Kahchun Wong.

In June 2026, she signed an exclusive multi-album recording agreement with Decca Classics, following her success at the 2025 International Chopin Piano Competition.

In August 2026, Lyu undertook a concert tour of Japan, including performances at Suntory Hall in Tokyo, where she played both of Chopin's piano concertos and gave a solo recital.

In October 2026, she performed Mozart's Piano Concerto No. 23 with the Warsaw Philharmonic Orchestra under Krzysztof Urbański. Later that month and in November, she appeared with The Hallé under Kahchun Wong at Bridgewater Hall in Manchester, performing Chopin's Piano Concerto No. 1.

On 21 October 2026, her eighteenth birthday, Lyu announced her debut studio album, Chopin. Recorded at the Warsaw Philharmonic concert hall in May 2026, the album features works by Frédéric Chopin, including the Barcarolle, Berceuse, three mazurkas from Op. 59, and the Andante spianato et grande polonaise brillante. Its release is scheduled for 12 February 2027.

On 17 November 2026, Lyu performed a piano half-recital at the ceremony conferring an honorary doctorate on her teacher, Katarzyna Popowa-Zydroń, at Aula Nova of the Academy of Music in Poznań.

== Accolades ==
Competition	Year	Award	Location	Reference
19th Ettlingen International Piano Competition	2024	(gold) First Prize (Category A)	Ettlingen, Germany	
31st International Fryderyk Chopin Piano Competition for Children and Youth	2024	(gold) First Prize (Group III) and Grand Prix	Szafarnia, Poland	
XIX International Chopin Piano Competition	2025	Fourth Prize; Warsaw Philharmonic Prize for Best Performance of a Concerto	Warsaw, Poland	
