= Étude Op. 25, No. 5 (Chopin) =

Étude written by Chopin

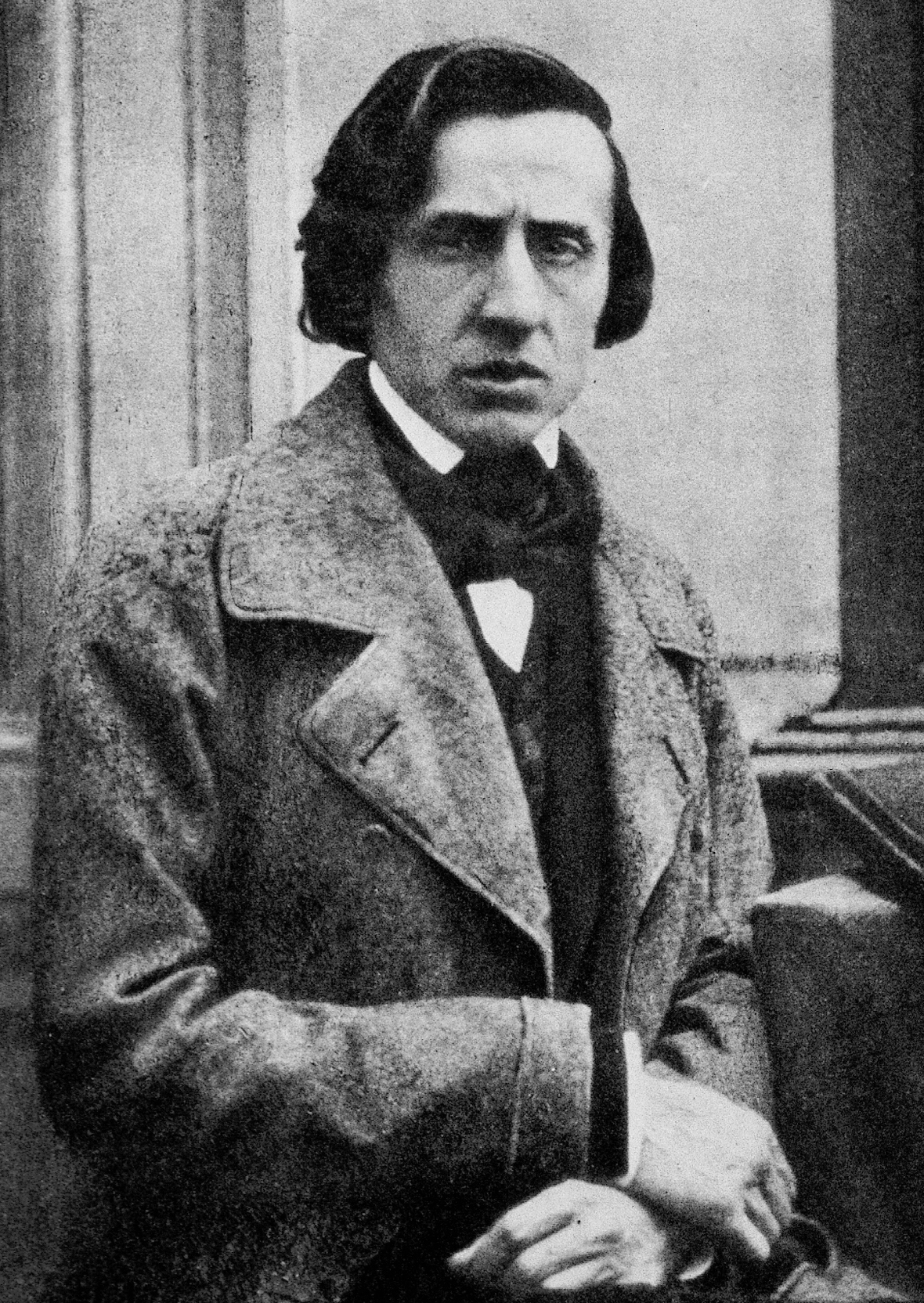
Frédéric Chopin, c. 1849

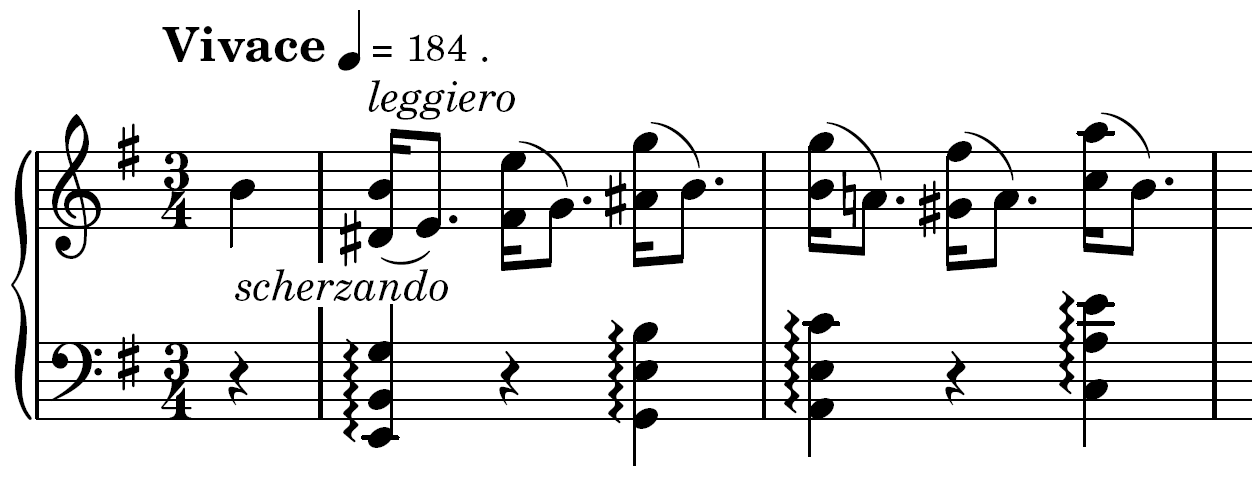
Excerpt from the beginning of the Étude Op. 25, No. 5

Étude Op. 25, No. 5 in E minor, is a technical study composed by Frédéric Chopin in 1837. Marking a serious departure in the expected technique developed previously, Chopin wrote this étude with a series of quick, dissonant minor seconds. The effect has earned the étude the nickname "Wrong Note".

== Structure ==
This piece follows an ABA ternary form. Initially marked schzerando, this etude is structured like a scherzo, featuring a light, jokey section, followed by a slower, more intimate theme, and ending with a recapitulation of the first section.

The first theme itself follows a similar structure, providing an initial dissonance, then entering a waltz-like dance, and finally realizing the initial bars with more dissonance.

After the first theme of 'minor seconds' closes, Chopin introduces a Più Lento section in which a new melody (without dissonant minor seconds) is played in the parallel key, E major. The final section of the piece starts with a recapitulation of the first theme, with climaxes in a coda played in E Major.

Étude Op. 25, No. 5
Martha Goldstein playing on an Erard (1851) - 3456KB

The second section is marked as Più Lento (It. More Slow) despite Chopin's metronome mark of ♩=168, a very quick tempo.

Étude Op. 25, No. 5 features an unusual overall structure, surrounding a major second theme, with the minor main theme. This idea appears only one other time in Chopin's set, in Étude Op. 25, No. 10. Styling the études in this fashion further emphasizes Chopin's deviation from the standard set before him by composers such as Carl Czerny.
