= Zitong Wang =

Chinese classical pianist

- 王紫桐
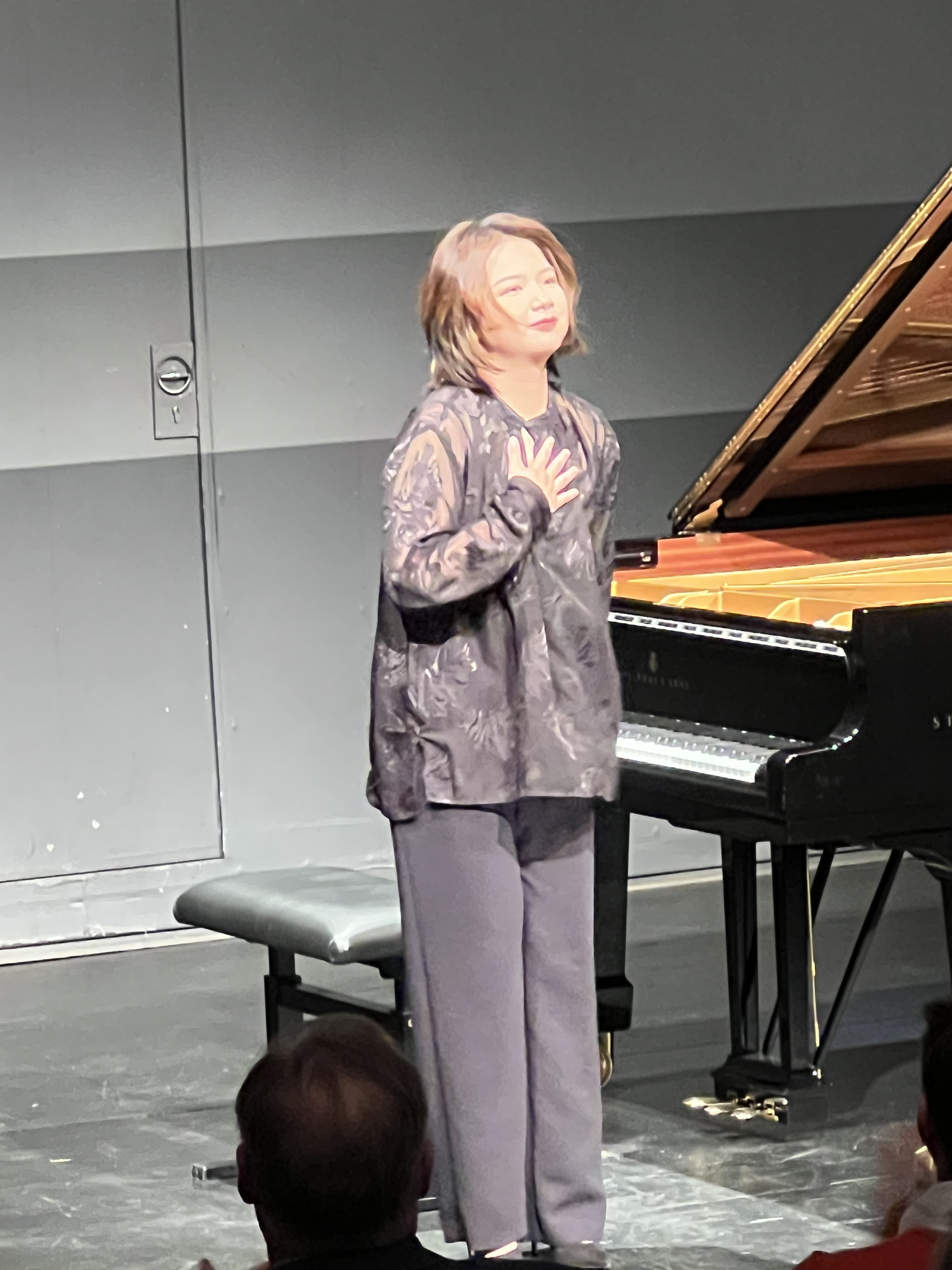
- Zitong Wang in Munich in 2025
- Born: February 3, 1999 (age 27); Hohhot, Inner Mongolia, China
- Education: Curtis Institute of Music; New England Conservatory of Music
- Occupation: Pianist
- Awards: 3rd prize and Krystian Zimerman Award for the best Sonata, XIX International Chopin Piano Competition (2025); 1st prize, Ferrol International Piano Competition (2022); 1st prize, Princeton International Piano Competition (2020)

Chinese name
- Simplified Chinese: 王紫桐
Transcriptions
Standard Mandarin
- Hanyu Pinyin: Wáng Zǐtóng

Zitong Wang (Chinese: 王紫桐; pinyin: Wáng Zǐtóng; born 3 February 1999) is a Chinese classical pianist. She was the third prize winner at the XIX International Chopin Piano Competition in 2025, where she also received the Krystian Zimerman Award for the best performance of a Sonata.

== Early life and education ==
Wang was born on 3 February 1999. She made her solo recital debut at the age of 13 at the Forbidden City Concert Hall in Beijing. That same year, she entered the Curtis Institute of Music where she studied with Meng-Chieh Liu and Eleanor Sokoloff. Wang graduated from Curtis in 2022. She later studied with Vietnamese-Canadian pianist Dang Thai Son at the New England Conservatory of Music in Boston.

== Career ==
Wang has won first prize in several international piano competitions, including the Rosalyn Tureck Bach Competition in New York in 2010 where she won a Rosalyn Tureck Prize, the Princeton International Piano Competition in 2020, and the International Piano Competition in Ferrol, Spain, in 2022. In 2023, she was awarded sixth prize at the Ferruccio Busoni International Piano Competition in Bolzano.

In October 2025, Wang achieved third prize at the XIX International Chopin Piano Competition in Warsaw. In addition to her main prize, she was awarded the Krystian Zimerman Award for the best performance of a Sonata during the competition. Wang also competed in the prior 2021 edition of the competition, the XVIII International Chopin Piano Competition, where she advanced to Stage I.
