= Sergei Redkin =

Russian classical pianist

Sergei Redkin (Russian: Сергей Редькин) (born 27 October 1991) is a Russian classical pianist.

== Life and career ==
Born in Krasnoyarsk, at the age of six Redkin began his studies in piano and composition at the Music Lyceum of Krasnoyarsk and the Special School of Music of the St Petersburg Conservatoire. Since 2009 Redkin studied at St Petersburg State Rimsky-Korsakov Conservatoire in the class of Alexander Sandler (piano) and Alexander Mnatsakanyan (composition), and at the Lake Como International Piano Academy in 2011. After completing his Master's degree at the St Petersburg Conservatory with Alexander Sandler, he further obtained an Artist Diploma at the Queen Elisabeth Music Chapel in Waterloo, Belgium under the guidance of Louis Lortie and Avo Kouyoumdjian. Since 2017, he has been an artist in residence at the Queen Elisabeth Music Chapel.

A winner of numerous international competitions, Redkin has performed with various orchestras and in recitals throughout the world, such as in Russia, Germany, Austria, USA, France, Monaco, Switzerland, Poland, Finland, Sweden and Spain, and has taken part in music festivals including the Lucerne Festival and the Verbier Festival.

== Awards and prizes ==
- Queen Elisabeth Competition, 2nd prize, piano (Brussels, Belgium, 2021).
- Kissinger Klavierolymp, 2nd prize (Bavaria, Germany, 2017)
- International Tchaikovsky competition, 3rd prize (Moscow, Russia, 2015)
- International Prokofiev competition, 1st prize (Saint Petersburg, Russia, 2012)
- International Maj Lind competition, 1st prize (Helsinki, Finland, 2012)
- International Competition of young pianists in the name of I. Paderevskiy (Poland, 2010)
