= Étude Op. 10, No. 6 (Chopin) =

1833 study for solo piano

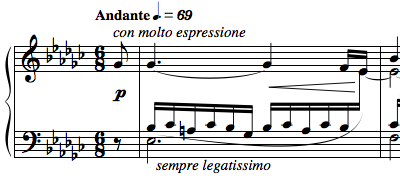
Excerpt from the Étude Op. 10, No. 6

Étude Op. 10, No. 6, in E♭ minor, is a study for solo piano composed by Frédéric Chopin in 1830. It was preceded by the relative key. It was first published in 1833 in France, Germany, and England as the sixth piece of his Études, Op. 10. The tempo Andante in 6/8 and con molto espressione indicate a more moderate playing speed than Chopin's other études with the exception of Op. 10, No. 3 and Op. 25, No. 7. This étude focuses on expressivity and chromatic structuring of the melody as well as polyphonic texture.

== Structure and stylistic traits ==
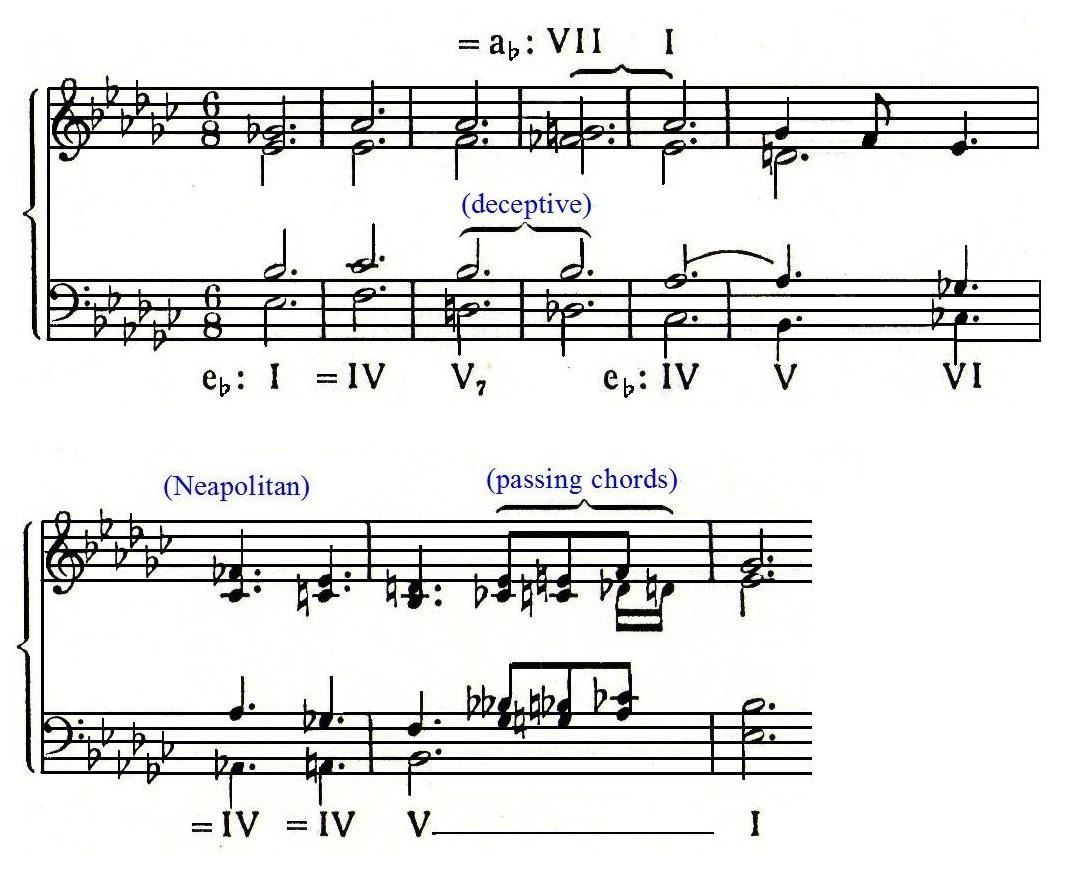
Harmonic reduction (bars 1–9) after Hugo Leichtentritt

Musicologist Hugo Leichtentritt (1874–1951) describes the three- (and sometimes four-) voice texture thus: "A melody of painful, elegiac expression over a slow, almost sluggish, bass, in-between a winding middle voice [in sixteenth notes] which, despite its narrow range adds a great inner agitation." A characteristic trait of the melody are the chromatic auxiliary notes played on the beat and approached by disjunct motion.

Like all of Chopin's other études, this work is in ternary form (A–B–A). The strict periodic structure contains eight-bar periods—two in the A section, forming a regular 16-bar period, three in the middle one and in the final A section a single eight-bar period expanded by five bars. The harmonic relationships in the first eight bars, marked by a deceptive twist to bar 4 and a Neapolitan chord in bar 7, are shown in a harmonic reduction. Bars 9–16 repeat the same progression, ending with an E♭ minor perfect cadence.

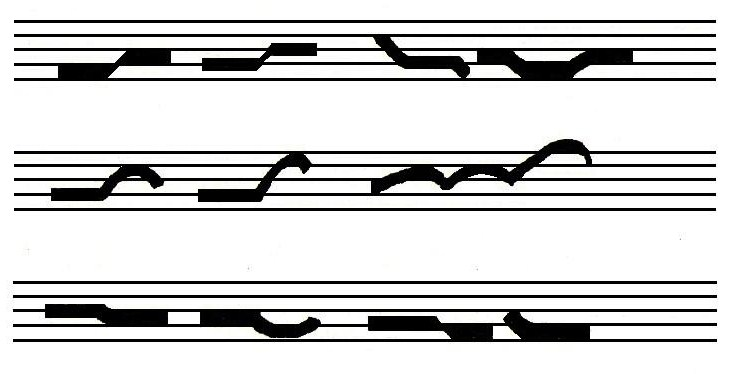
Leichtentritt's graphic sketch of the middle section (bars 17–41) showing the individual design of the three eight-bar periods

The three eight-bar periods of the middle section do each have a particular design. The first one is marked by a rise to the middle and a corresponding descent of the consequent. The irregular second one, leading to the climax, reveals its excited rhythmic nature especially in the consequent, while the third one is a steady chromatic descent from the climax. The effect of the harmonic progression of this middle section is described thus by Leichtentritt: "A magnificent transition from E♭ minor (bar 16) to the mildly shining E major (bar 21) [Chopin has changed the key signature here]; the exciting chains of sequences with their cross-relations (bars 29–32); the wonderfully sonorous decline to E♭ minor so delicately shaded with accents of timbre (bars 33–41)."

The final A section is a shortened repeat of the first one. In the last seven bars a most beautiful effect is produced by the repeated use of the chord of the Neapolitan sixth to delay the final cadence and especially by the "unexpected gleaming" of A major (bar 49) in the E♭ minor cadence. This A major enchantingly reflects the E major of the middle section (bar 24). The piece closes with a Picardy third, in E♭ major.

== Character ==
American music critic James Huneker (1857–1921) calls the étude "a dark doleful nocturne. […] the melody is full of stifled sorrow." Italian composer and editor Alfredo Casella (1883–1947) speaks of "meditated grief" and thinks "it is difficult to conceive an elegy more severe and sober than this study." French pianist Alfred Cortot (1877–1962) on the other hand calls the character of this study "feverish and concentrated" and insists that "below the passionate lament of the upper voice […] we must hear a vital lower part […] uniting with it [yet] preserving its own timbre and its own freedom of rhythm."

== Tempo ==
Chopin's metronome mark, given in the original French and German editions, is . = 69 referring to dotted quarter notes. The English edition has = 69 referring to quarter notes instead. Austrian pianist and composer Gottfried Galston (1879–1950) suggests a tempo of . = 50, as "the carrying power of the modern piano's cantabile allows for a broader layout of the cantilena." He also believes that "the tempo of this étude is subjected to the most multifarious fluctuations." Polish pianist and editor Jan Ekier (born 1913) writes in the Performance Commentary to the Polish National Edition that this étude is "always performed slower or much slower than is indicated by [Chopin's] tempo. […] the tempo becomes as much as three times slower than the authentic one, thus changing the metronomic unit from . = 69 to = 69. The causes could be discerned in certain performance "traditions" prevailing during the second half of the nineteenth century, which had little in common with those derived directly from Chopin."

== Technical difficulties ==
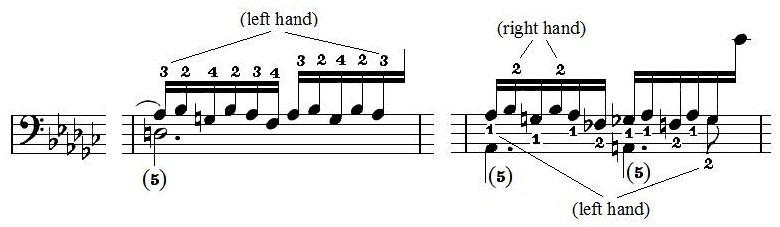
Two examples of Chopin's original fingering (bar 3 and bar 7)

In Schumann's 1836 Neue Zeitschrift für Musik article on piano études, the study, together with Op. 10, No. 3, is classified under the category "melody and accompaniment in one hand simultaneously." Cortot states that the attention of the student should be directed to perfecting polyphonic playing, an expressive intensity of tone and legato and believes that finding the individual tone for each of the simultaneous melodic lines is a particular difficulty. He suggests to produce the tone of the upper part by pressing the keys to the bottom with firm and straight fingers. To ensure even action of the fingers playing the figure in semiquavers he recommends to start practicing in a non legato where the fingers do not lose contact with the key. For the final legato the weight of the hand should bear slightly on each semiquaver to produce a kind of portamento with a timbre that will not merge into the upper melodic line. Cortot also introduces an exercise for flexibility of the foot to produce an "uninterrupted quivering" pedal, but advises to practice the finger legato first without pedal. There are no original pedal marks by Chopin.

== Arrangements ==
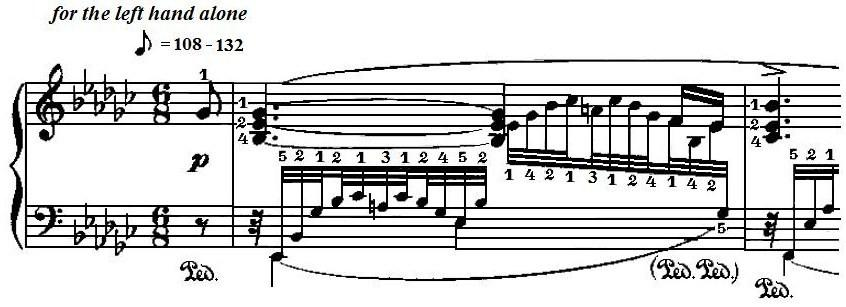
Leopold Godowsky's left hand version, publ. 1909 (opening)

A version for the left hand alone can be found in Leopold Godowsky's 53 Studies on Chopin's Études. Canadian pianist Marc-André Hamelin (born 1961) describes this "most beautiful achievement" thus: "A continuous, rapid line of demisemiquavers snakes its way around and through Chopin's melancholic chorale, enhancing it without being in the least bit obtrusive."
