= Maj Lind =

Finnish philanthropist

Maria (Maj) Lind, née Kopjeff (1876–1942) was a philanthropist, who studied piano in Kuopio and Saint Petersburg. She married a Helsinki businessman, Arvid Lind, and inherited a considerable fortune when he died. She left a bequest "for the development of pianists" to the Sibelius Academy. This money was used to fund the International Maj Lind Piano Competition, which has been held since 1945 and was opened to international competitors in 2002.
