= Garrick Ohlsson =

American pianist (born 1948)

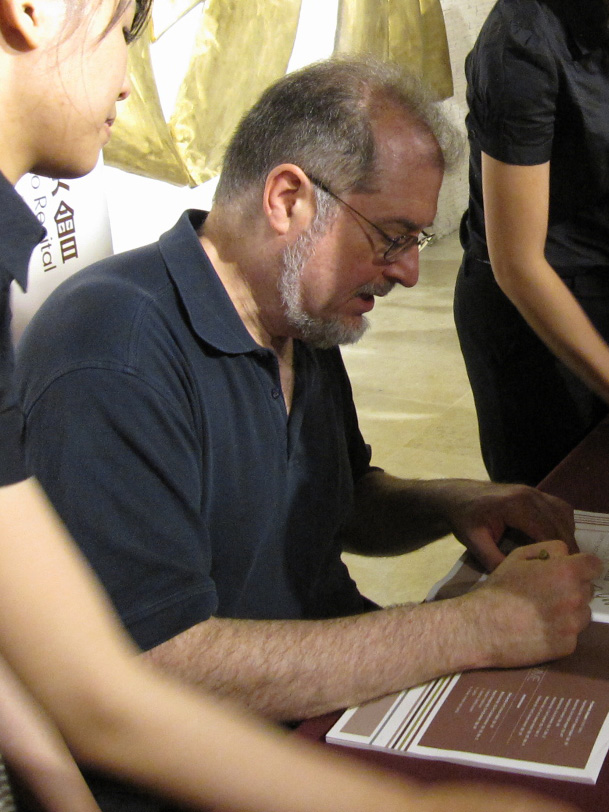
- Ohlsson in 2010

Background information
- Born: April 3, 1948 (age 78); Bronxville, New York, U.S.
- Genres: Classical
- Instrument: Piano
- Website: garrickohlsson.com

Garrick Olaf Ohlsson (born April 3, 1948) is an American classical pianist. In 1970, he became the first competitor from the United States to win the gold medal awarded by the International Chopin Piano Competition, at the VIII competition. He also won first prize at the Busoni Competition in Bolzano, Italy, and the Montreal Piano Competition in Canada. He was awarded the Avery Fisher Prize in 1994 and received the 1998 University Musical Society Distinguished Artist Award in Ann Arbor, Michigan. Ohlsson has also been nominated for three Grammy Awards, winning one in 2008.

In 2018, in Warsaw, Ohlsson received the Gloria Artis Medal for Merit to Culture, conferred by the Polish Ministry of Culture and National Heritage.

== Early life ==
Born in Bronxville, New York, as the only child of a Swedish father, Alvar Ohlsson, who emigrated from Sweden after World War II, and Sicilian-American mother, Paulyne (Rosta), born in New York City, Ohlsson grew up in White Plains, New York. He began formal piano lessons at the Westchester Conservatory of Music with Tom Lishman at age eight. At the age of thirteen he began studying with Sascha Gorodnitzki at the Juilliard School, and later with Rosina Lhévinne. His musical development was influenced in completely different ways by a succession of distinguished teachers, most notably Claudio Arrau, Olga Barabini and Irma Wolpe.

Although Ohlsson is especially noted for his performances of the works of Chopin, Mozart, Beethoven, Liszt, and Schubert, his range of repertoire is broad, extending from J. S. Bach and Busoni to Copland, Griffes, Debussy, Scriabin, Gershwin, Rachmaninoff, and contemporary composers who have written new works for him, such as Justin Dello Joio. Writing in The New York Times, music critic Allan Kozinn has characterized Ohlsson's repertory as "huge." His repertoire includes no fewer than 80 concertos. He is also known for his exceptional keyboard stretch (a 12th in the left hand and an 11th in the right).

== Career ==
Ohlsson has performed in North America with symphony orchestras of Atlanta, Charlotte, Cleveland, Philadelphia, Boston, St. Louis, Cincinnati, Minneapolis, Milwaukee, Indianapolis, Houston, Detroit, Baltimore, Pittsburgh, Los Angeles, Seattle, Denver, Washington, D.C., and Berkeley, among others, at the National Arts Center, with the St. Paul Chamber Orchestra and with the London Philharmonic at Lincoln Center in New York. He has also accompanied violinist Hilary Hahn and contralto Ewa Podles.

Ohlsson is an avid chamber musician, having collaborated with the Cleveland, Emerson, Takács and Tokyo string quartets, in addition to other ensembles. In 2005–2006, he toured with the Takács Quartet. He is also a founding member of San Francisco's FOG Trio, together with violinist Jorja Fleezanis and cellist Michael Grebanier.

In 2006–2007, he played the opening concert at the Mostly Mozart Festival in New York. He has also performed at the BBC Proms with the Budapest Festival Orchestra.

Among his many recordings, Ohlsson performed Chopin's entire musical output on Hyperion Records–including the complete solo piano music, chamber music, works for piano and orchestra, and songs. In 1989 he recorded Busoni's five-movement Piano Concerto in C major Op. 39 with the Cleveland Orchestra under Christoph von Dohnányi. He has also recorded all 32 Beethoven piano sonatas for Bridge Records.

Shortly after his Chopin competition victory in 1970, he appeared as performing guest on ABC's The Dick Cavett Show on 25 February 1971. The show also featured actor/singer Sammy Davis Jr., and young Family Affair actress Anissa Jones.

In 2025 Ohlsson became the chairman of the jury for the XIX International Chopin Piano Competition, becoming the first non-Polish person to hold this position.

== Personal life ==
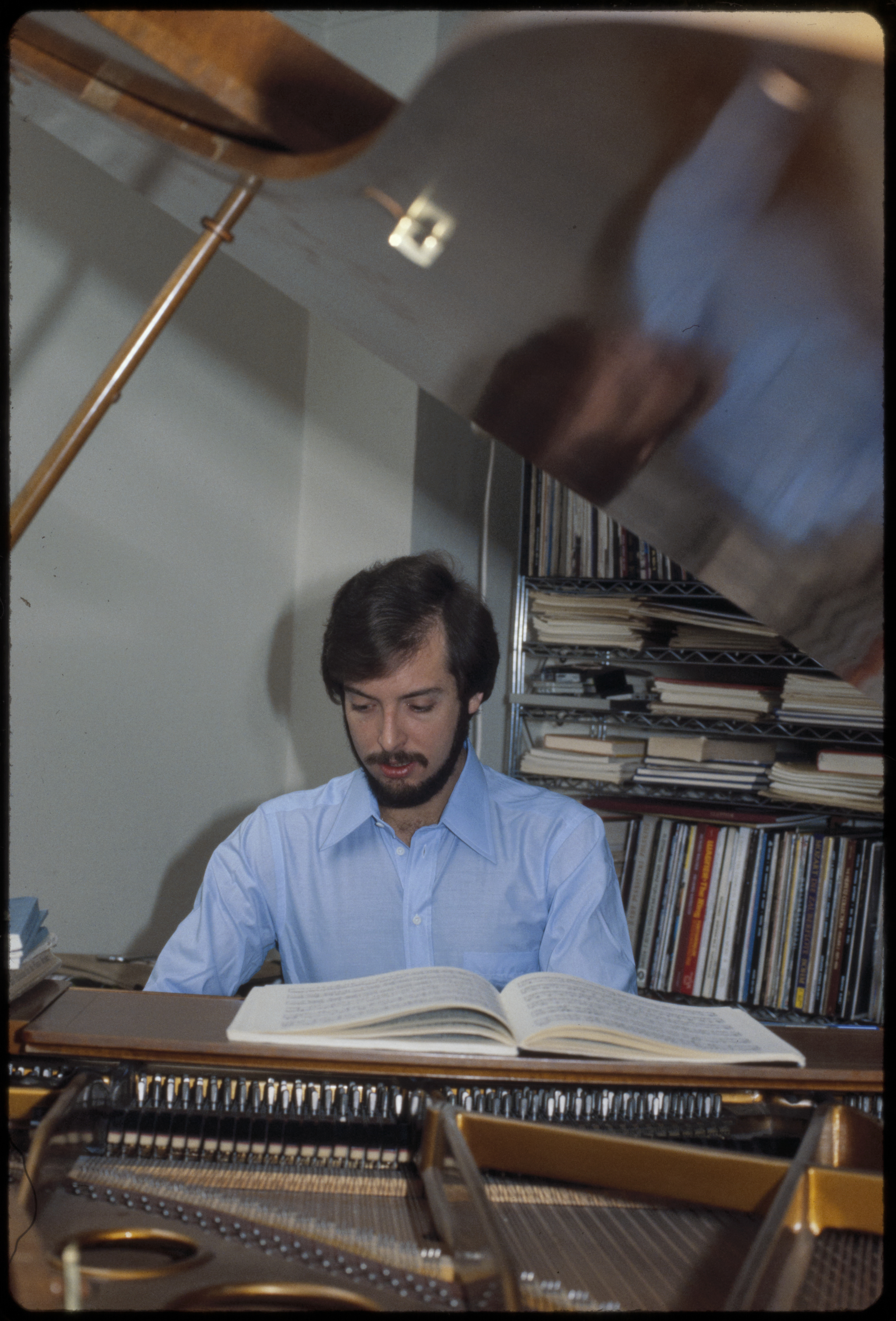
Ohlsson, January 1978

Since 1996, Ohlsson has lived in San Francisco with his husband, historic preservationist Robert Guter.

He is a member of the faculty of the San Francisco Conservatory of Music.

== Prizes ==
- First Prize, 1966 Ferruccio Busoni International Piano Competition, Bolzano
- First Prize, 1968 Montreal Piano Competition
- First Prize, 1970 VIII International Chopin Piano Competition, Warsaw
- Avery Fisher Prize, 1994
- Grammy Award, 2008
- Jean Gimbel Lane Prize in Piano Performance, 2014, Northwestern University
- Gloria Artis Medal for Merit to Culture, 2018
- Gramophone Award (with Takács Quartet), 2021

== Discography ==
Ohlsson has recorded with the following labels:

- Arabesque Recordings
- RCA Red Seal Records
- Angel Records
- Bridge Records
- BMG
- Decca
- Delos International
- Hänssler Classic
- Hyperion Records – complete works of Chopin
- Nonesuch Records
- Telarc
- EMI Classics
- Connoisseur Society
