= Kevin Chen (pianist) =

Canadian classical pianist (born 2005)

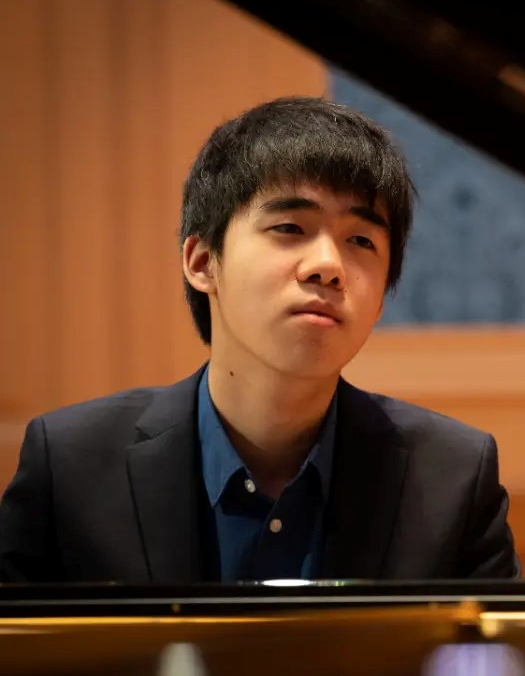
- Chen in 2022
- Born: March 7, 2005 (age 21); Edmonton, Alberta, Canada
- Education: Hochschule für Musik, Theater und Medien Hannover
- Occupation: Pianist
- Awards: 2nd prize, XIX International Chopin Piano Competition (2025); 1st prize, Arthur Rubinstein International Piano Master Competition (2023); 1st prize, Geneva International Music Competition (2022)

Chinese name
- Traditional Chinese: 陳禹同
- Simplified Chinese: 陈禹同
Transcriptions
Standard Mandarin
- Hanyu Pinyin: Chén Yǔtóng

Kevin Chen (born 7 March 2005) is a Canadian classical pianist. He was the second prize winner at the XIX International Chopin Piano Competition in 2025. He is also the winner of the 2023 Arthur Rubinstein International Piano Master Competition in Tel Aviv and the winner of the 2022 Geneva International Music Competition.

== Early life and education ==
Chen was born on 7 March 2005 to a Chinese family. He received early piano instruction from Colleen Athparia, Krzysztof Jabłoński, and Marilyn Engle. Described as a child prodigy, he made his orchestral debut at the age of eight. He also studied composition with Jared Miller. Since October 2023, he has been studying with Arie Vardi at the Hochschule für Musik, Theater und Medien in Hanover, Germany.

== Career ==
Chen gained international recognition after winning first prize at the Franz Liszt International Piano Competition (Budapest) in 2021, and Concours de Genève in 2022, followed by a victory at the Arthur Rubinstein International Piano Master Competition in Tel Aviv in 2023. He has performed with several orchestras in North America, Europe, and Asia, including the Warsaw Philharmonic Orchestra and the Orchestre de la Suisse Romande.

In October 2025, at the age of 20, he won the second prize at the XIX International Chopin Piano Competition in Warsaw. Throughout the competition, he received significant praise from critics. His virtuosity was compared favorably to that of the previous winner, Bruce Liu, with praise for maintaining expression and contrasts even at remarkable speeds. During the competition, Chen stated that he intentionally avoids social media and broadcasts to concentrate solely on his performance.
