= Mateusz Dubiel =

Polish pianist (born 2004)

- Born: 13 February 2004 (age 22); Bielsko-Biała
- Citizenship: Polish
- Occupation: pianist

Mateusz Dubiel (born 13 February 2004) is a pianist.

== Biography ==
As a child, he sang and played gorals' folk music on the harmonica and accordion with his grandfather. At the age of five or six, he began attending music school in Buczkowice. He began professional music education in the second grade of elementary school. From the fifth grade, he played in a big band in Bielsko-Biała.

In the years 2019–2023 he was a scholarship holder of the National Children's Fund. He was a scholarship holder of the Teresa Sahakian Foundation at the Royal Castle in Warsaw, a scholarship holder of the Minister of Culture, National Heritage and Sport (2020, 2022), and a laureate of the "Young Poland" scholarship program in 2021.

In 2021, he won 6th place at the 12th International Competition for Young Pianists “Arthur Rubinstein in Memoriam” in Bydgoszcz and received the Ikar Award of the Mayor of Bielsko-Biała in the field of culture and art. He won 1st place and four additional prizes at the 27th International Fryderyk Chopin Piano Competition for Children and Youth in Szafarnia.

He participated in courses led by Lidia Grychtołówna, Andrzej Jasiński, Piotr Paleczny, Arie Vardi, Angela Hewitt, Katarzyna Popowa-Zydroń, and Joanna Ławrynowicz-Just. In 2023, he graduated from the Stanisław Moniuszko State Music School Complex in Bielsko-Biała, in the piano class of Anna Skarbowska. He then began his studies at the Krzysztof Penderecki Academy of Music in Kraków, in the piano class of Mirosław Herbowski.

In 2022, he received the First Prize at the 51st National Fryderyk Chopin Competition in Warsaw. In 2022 he took first place at the Chopin Interpretations of the Young Piano Festival in Konin-Żychlin. In 2023 he received second place at the 3rd International Piano Competition "Jeune Chopin" in Lugano, Switzerland and second place at the Baltic International Piano Competition in Gdańsk. He took third place in the International Sviatoslav Richter Competition in Seoul. He received first place and a special prize for his performance of a sonata at the 52nd International Piano Competition "Virtuosi Per Musica di Pianoforte" in the Czech Republic.

He has given concerts at the Royal Castle in Warsaw, the Festsaal des Amtshauses Hietzing in Vienna, the Fryderyk Chopin Birthplace in Żelazowa Wola, the Krzysztof Penderecki European Centre for Music in Lusławice, the Vigyázó Sandor Music Centre in Budapest, the Pomeranian Philharmonic, and the Kraków Philharmonic. In 2023, he gave concerts in Tokyo at the "Chopin in Omotesando" festival, and in Hamamatsu, Osaka, and Kobe (Japan). In the same year, he gave recitals in the United States, Paris, Vilnius, Hamburg, Cologne, and Mallorca.

In February 2025, he received the First Prize in the 53rd National Fryderyk Chopin Piano Competition. In October 2025, he performed in the 19th International Fryderyk Chopin Piano Competition in Warsaw. After his performance there, Magdalena Lisak called him "a real diamond".
