= International Maj Lind Piano Competition =

Piano competition

The International Maj Lind Piano Competition is organized by the Sibelius Academy and takes place in Helsinki, Finland. Originally a national competition that was first held in 1945, it was opened to international competitors in 2002 and has since then been held every five years.

The competition is named after Finnish philanthropist Maj Lind (1876–1942).

== Winners ==
In 2022, prize money of over €100,000 was awarded. The first prize was won by Piotr Pawlak.

In 2017 the first prize was won by Mackenzie Melemed.

In 2012 the first prize was won by Sergei Redkin.

In 2007 the first prize was won by Sofya Gulyak.

In 2002 the first prize was won by Alberto Nosè.
