= Paweł Wakarecy =

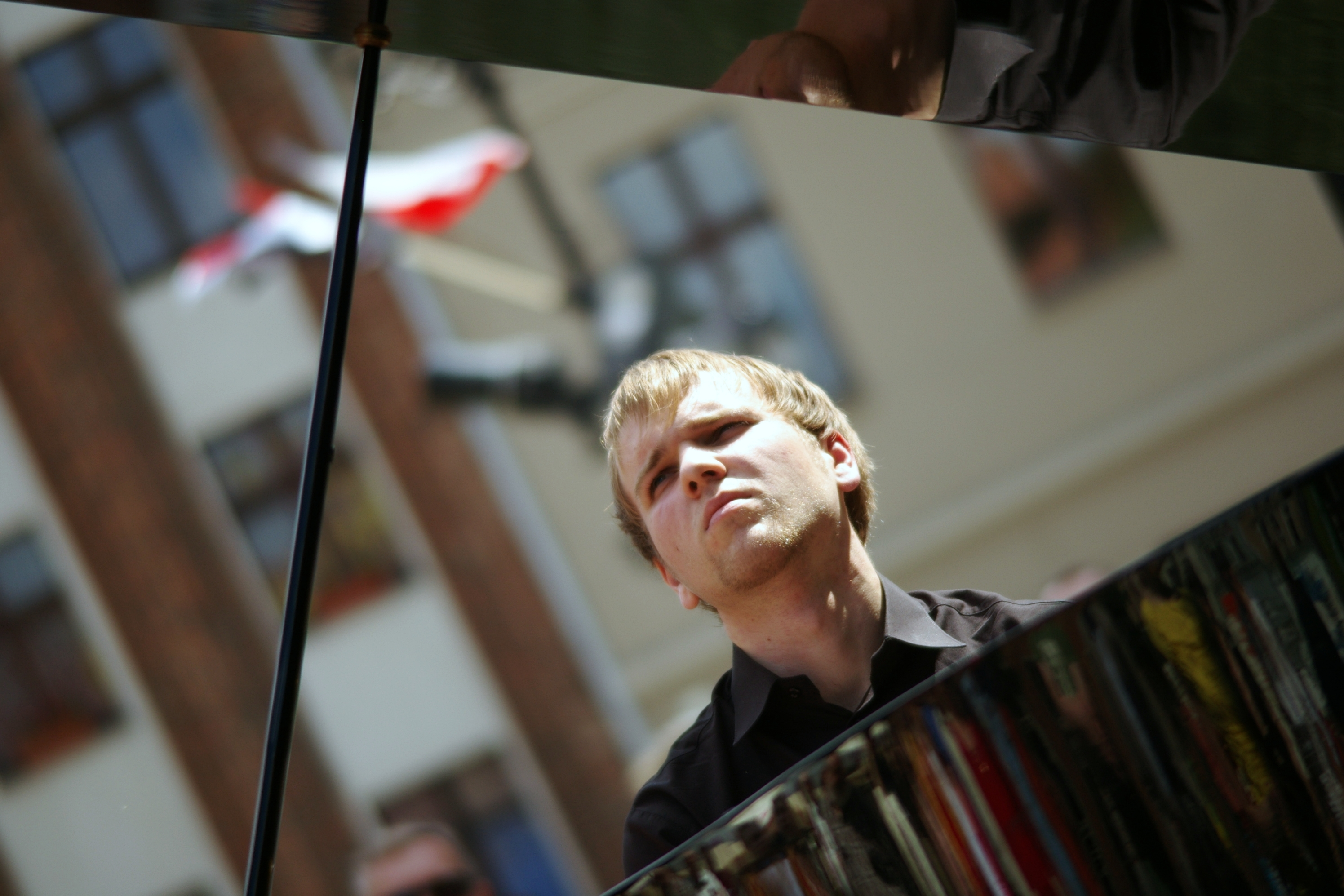
- Paweł Wakarecy, 2015

Background information
- Born: 14 October 1987 (age 38); Toruń, Poland
- Genres: Classical music
- Occupations: Composer, pianist
- Instrument: Piano
- Website: pawelwakarecy.com

Paweł Wakarecy (born 14 October 1987) is a Polish classical pianist. He is a winner of highest prizes at national and international piano competitions.

Wakarecy was one of ten finalists at the Warsaw XVI International Chopin Piano Competition of 452 entrants from 45 countries and received the Distinction Award with the prize of €4,000.

== Biography ==
Paweł Wakarecy was born on 14 October 1987 in Toruń, Poland. He was a student at the Academy of Music in Bydgoszcz, studying with pianist Katarzyna Popowa-Zydroń.

He is a winner of many piano competitions, including Szafarnia and Konin. He was a finalist of the Frederic Chopin Competition in Warsaw (2010).
