= Nathalia Milstein =

French classical pianist (born 1995)

Nathalia Milstein (born in 1995) is a French classical pianist.

== Biography ==
Born in Lyon, Milstein was born into a family of Russian musicians, and was initiated to the piano by her father Serguei Milstein at the age of 4. She entered the Conservatoire de Musique de Genève in 2009. She won the Flame Competition in 2008, 2009 and 2010.

In 2013, in the class of the Argentinean pianist Nelson Goerner, she obtained a bachelor's degree from the Geneva Haute École de musique. In 2015, she continued her professional higher education in music at the Haute École de musique de Genève with a Master's degree as soloist. During her training, she attended the masterclasses of renowned classical pianists and teachers such as Elena Ashkenazy, Jean-Marc Luisada, Krzysztof Jablonski and Menahem Pressler.

Her grandfather Iakov Milstein was a musicologist and piano teacher at the Tchaikovsky Conservatory of Moscow.

She has been performing in a duet with her sister, violinist Maria Milstein. since 2005.

== Career ==
In May 2015, Milstein became the first woman to win the 1st Prize at the Dublin International Piano Competition.

Following this recognition, she was invited to perform throughout the 2015-2016 season, in Europe and North America, in venues such as the Wigmore Hall in London and the Zankel Hall in New York.

In October 2015, she took part in the radio program "Génération Jeunes Interprètes" hosted by Gaëlle Le Gallic on France Musique.

On April 29, 2016, she accompanied the Orchestre philharmonique de Radio France, under the direction of Marcelo Lehninger and gave her first concert at the Maison de la Radio auditorium. She was rewarded the same year, with the Prix jeune soliste des médias francophones publics 2017.

== Prizes and distinctions ==
- Winner of the Concours Flame (2008, 2009, 2010)
- 1st prize in the competitions of the Conservatoire de Musique de Genève (2010, 2011 and 2012)
- 1st prize in her category of the 3rd International Concerto Competition of Manchester (2011)
- 2nd prize in the Grand International Piano Competition in Corbelin (July 2013)
- 1st prize in the International Piano Competition in Gaillard (June 2014)
- 1st prize in the 10th International Piano Competition in Dublin (May 2015)
- Young soloist prize of "médias francophones publics" (2017)
