= Szafarnia =

Szafarnia may refer to the following places:

- Szafarnia, Kuyavian-Pomeranian Voivodeship (north-central Poland)
- Szafarnia, Masovian Voivodeship (east-central Poland)
- Szafarnia, Warmian-Masurian Voivodeship (north Poland)
