= Tomoharu Ushida =

Japanese pianist (born 1999)

- Origin: Fukushima Prefecture Iwaki City Japan
- Genres: Classical
- Occupation: pianist
- Instrument: piano
- Years active: 2012–present
- Label: Universal Classics

Tomoharu Ushida (Japanese: 牛田智大) (born Fukushima, Japan, October 16, 1999) is a Japanese pianist.

== Early life and education ==
Ushida was born in Fukushima Prefecture. He moved to Shanghai with his family soon after he was born, due to his father's business. He came back to Japan when he enrolled in primary school in Aichi Prefecture.

Ushida studied at the Moscow Conservatory under the supervision of Yuri Slesarev and Alexander Vershinin. He released his debut album Liebesträume from Universal Classics in 2012, at the age of 12, as the youngest Japanese classical pianist.

Ushida composed the theme music of exhibition "Liechtenstein" held at the New National Art Center in Tokyo and performed in the presence of former Crown Prince (now His Majesty the Emperor) of Japan in 2012.

In 2014, Ushida performed for the first time with overseas artists, the Wiener Kammer Orchestra (conducted by Stefan Vlader). In 2015 and 2019, he performed with the Russian National Orchestra conducted by Mikhail Pletnev, and the Warsaw National Philharmonic Orchestra conducted by Yatsek Kaspsik in 2018.

Ushida won the second prize in the 10th Hamamatsu International Piano Competition in 2018.

Ushida participated in the 21st Leeds International Piano Competition in 2024 and reached the semi-finals. He also won the Medici.tv Audience Prize.

== Awards ==
- 2011 – XII International Chopin Piano Competition in ASIA – Concert B Division – First Prize (youngest in the history of the category)
- 2012 – XIII International Chopin Piano Competition in ASIA – Concert C Division – First Prize (youngest in the history of the category)
- 2012 – XVI Hamamatsu International Piano Academy Competition – First Prize (youngest in the history of the competition)
- 2018 – X Hamamatsu International Piano Competition – Second Prize, Audience Award, Award from President of Warsaw, Poland
- 2019 – 29th Idemitsu Music Awards

== Discography ==
CDs	Launch date	Record company	Number
Liebesträume ~ Tomoharu Ushida debut	March 14, 2012	Universal Music Japan	UCCY-9012 / UCCY-1023
Memories	August 22, 2012	Universal Music Japan	UCCY-9015 / UCCY-1026
Dedication-List & Chopin Masterpieces	June 19, 2013	Universal Music Japan	UCCY-9018 / UCCY-1030
Träumerei	July 2, 2014	Universal Music Japan	UCCY-9019 / UCCY-1039
Liebesfreud	June 24, 2015	Universal Music Japan	UCCY-9024 / UCCY-1056
Pictures at an exhibition	September 14, 2016	Universal Music Japan	UCCY-1069 /
Chopin: Ballade No. 1 e 24 Preludes	March 20, 2019	Universal Music Japan	UCCY-1096 /
Chopin Recital 2022	August 31, 2022	Universal Music Japan	UCCY-1115 / UCXY-1003
