= Piotr Pawlak =

Polish pianist

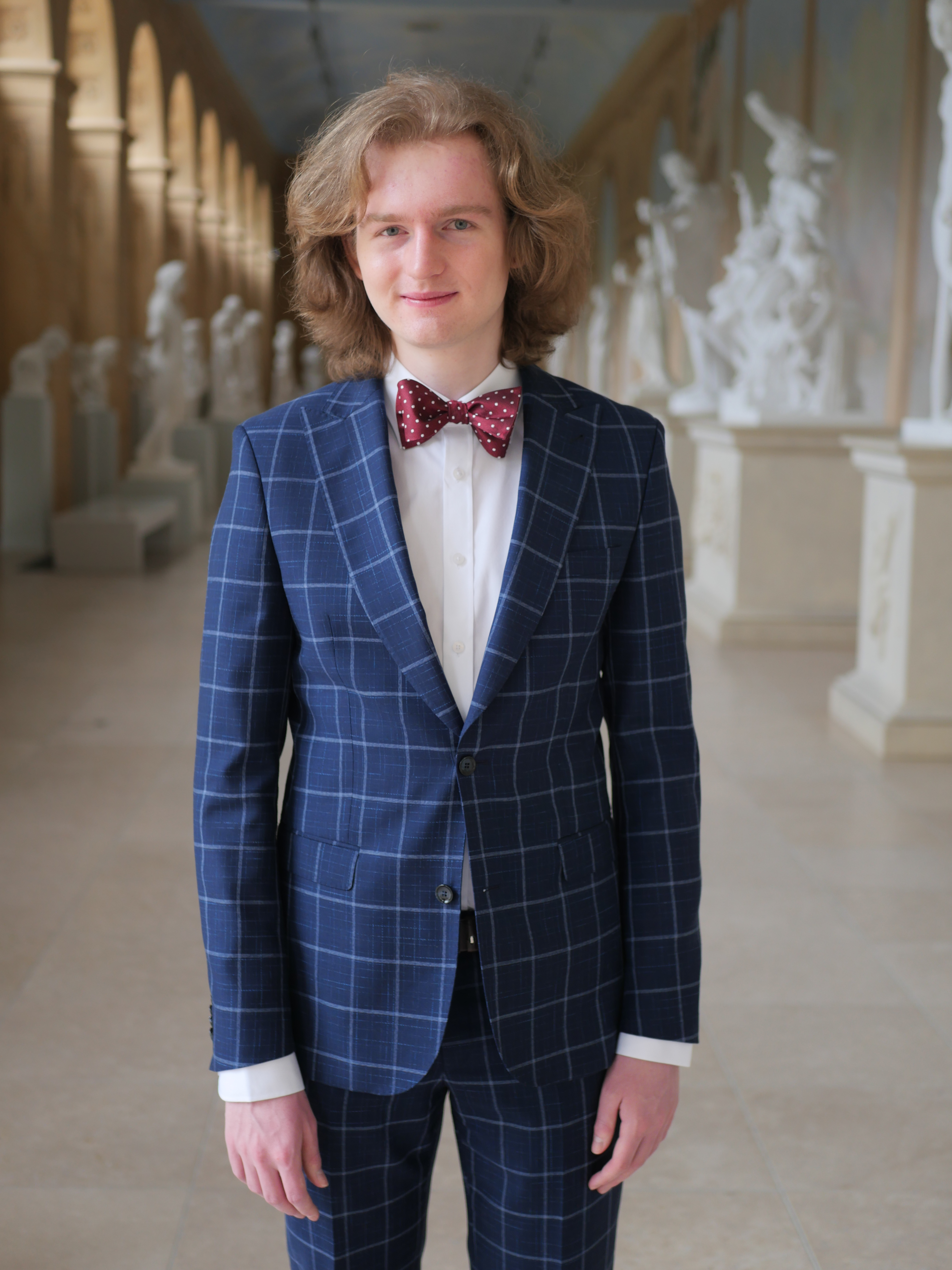
- Piotr Pawlak in 2020, after concert in Orangery in Łazienki Park in Warsaw, Poland

Background information
- Also known as: Piotr Ryszard Pawlak
- Born: February 20, 1998 (age 28); Gdańsk, Poland
- Genres: Classical music
- Occupation: Musician
- Instruments: Piano, pipe organ
- Website: https://piotrpawlak.eu

Piotr Pawlak (born 20 February 1998) is a Polish classical pianist. He won the V International Maj Lind Piano Competition in Helsinki and XI International Chopin Piano Competition in Darmstadt.

== Education ==
He began his musical education playing the piano at the age of six in Feliks Nowowiejski Music School in Gdansk with Ewa Włodarczyk, and then continued to study with Waldemar Wojtal until the end of his studies in 2021. He also graduated from music school in organ studies under the tutorship of Hanna Dys and attended the Stanislaw Moniuszko Music Academy in Gdansk with Zygmunt Rychert. He attended masterclasses with, among others, Kevin Kenner, Dang Thai Son and Dmitri Alexeev. In 2024, he enrolled as a student at the International Piano Academy Lake Como.

Pawlak competed at the International Mathematical Olympiad in 2014 and 2015, representing Poland and winning bronze medals in both years. He studied mathematics at the University of Gdańsk while attending the Stanislaw Moniuszko Music Academy, defending a master's thesis in 2020. He is working on a doctoral thesis on non-orientable surfaces.

== Awards and prizes ==
- II International Chopin Competition on Period Instruments in Warsaw, Poland (2023) – 2nd prize
- XII Paderewski International Piano Competition in Bydgoszcz, Poland (2022) – distinction
- V International Maj Lind Piano Competition in Helsinki, Finland (2022) – 1st prize
- Premio Internazionale Antonio Mormone in Milan, Italy (2021) – finalist
- I International Competition of Polish Music in Rzeszów, Poland (2019) – 2nd prize
- XI International Chopin Competition in Darmstadt, Germany (2017) – 1st prize and prize for the best improvisation
- The Beijing International Fryderyk Chopin Piano Competition for Young Pianists in Beijing (2016) – 2nd prize
