= Ryan Wang =

Canadian pianist

Ryan Wang (born August 16, 2007) is a Canadian pianist. He has performed at Carnegie Hall and was featured on The Ellen DeGeneres Show.

== Early life and education ==
Wang was born in West Vancouver. He began playing piano at the age of four. Beginning in 2013, he began studying with piano teachers Lee Kum Sing and Sunsung Kong. He was awarded a music scholarship to Eton College at the age of 13.

== Career ==
Wang performed his first solo recital at Carnegie Hall in 2013, at the age of five. He was selected for the performance as part of the American Protégé International Piano and Strings Competition and played Variations on a Russian Theme. He placed second in the competition. Shortly after his performance at Carnegie Hall, Wang appeared on The Ellen DeGeneres Show, where he again performed Variations on a Russian Theme. Wang has played with the Vancouver Metropolitan Orchestra and the Shanghai Symphony and performed in Steinway Hall and Italy's Fazioli Hall. He currently attends the A.B./M.M. dual degree program between Harvard University and the New England Conservatory under Wha Kyung Byun, from which he will graduate in 2030.

== Awards ==
Among his awards are first-prize finishes in the 2019 Seattle International Piano Competition, 2019 Edith Lando Gifted Youth Competition, 2021 Young Euregio Piano Award Competition, 2021 Gustav Mahler Piano Competition, the 29th International Fryderyk Chopin Piano Competition for Youth in Szafarnia, Poland, 2022 Chicago International Music Competition, 2022 Paderewski International Piano Competition in Bydgoszcz and the 2022 International Piano Competition ‘SAMSON FRANCOIS’. From 2015 to 2019, Wang participated in the Casalmaggiore International Music Festival in Italy where he gave solo recitals and performed concertos with the Festival Orchestra. He was the recipient of the Gabora Prize in 2017 and the Audience Favorite Award of Best Musician in 2019. In 2017 and 2019, Wang was the recipient of the Emerging Artist Grant from the Vancouver Academy of Music.

In October 2024, Wang received the BBC Young Musician Award. His performance of Rachmaninov's Second Piano Concerto in the Final, held at Bristol Beacon, was described by one of the judges as "world class".
