= Étude Op. 25, No. 6 (Chopin) =

Technical music study focusing on thirds

Étude Op. 25, No. 6
Martha Goldstein playing on an Érard (1851)

Étude Op. 25, No. 6
Performed by Randolph Hokanson

Étude Op. 25, No. 6, in G♯ minor, is a technical study composed by Frédéric Chopin focusing on thirds, trilling them at a high speed. Also called the Double Thirds Étude, it is considered one of the hardest of Chopin's 24 Études, ranking the highest level of difficulty according to the Henle difficulty rankings.

Excerpt from the beginning of the Étude Op. 25 No. 6

== Technical difficulties ==
The most conspicuous difficulty is the trilling of thirds quickly, such as in the beginning of the piece. However, there are also other difficulties, such as playing a chromatic scale in thirds with one hand (m. 5), and broken pairs of thirds divided between the upper and lower parts of each hand (m. 27). At one point (m. 31), both hands do this together in descending diminished seventh chords.
