= Étude Op. 25, No. 7 (Chopin) =

Composition for piano by Frédéric Chopin

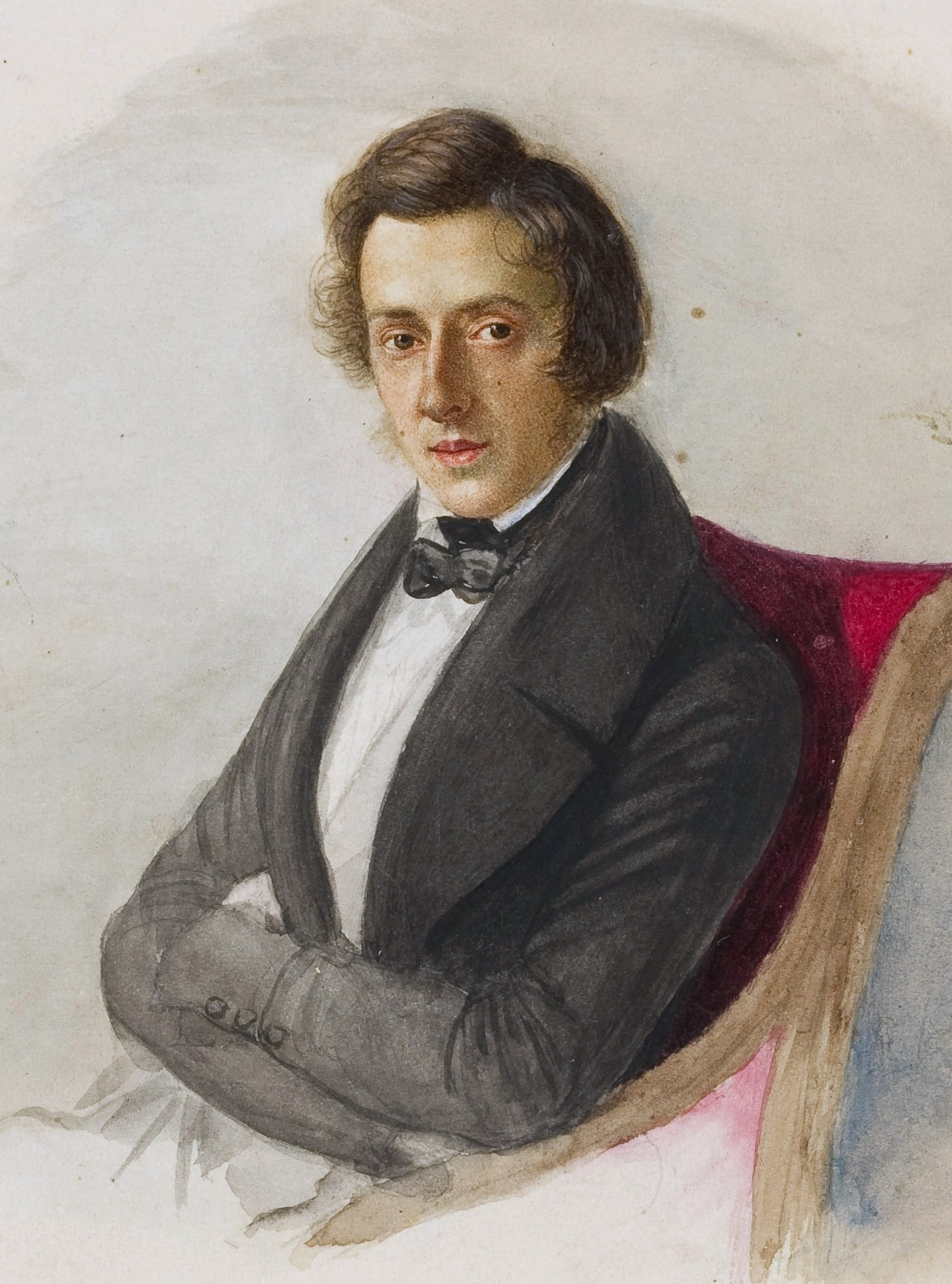
Chopin at 25, by his fiancée Maria Wodzińska, 1835

Étude Op. 25, No.7
Martha Goldstein playing on an Erard (1851) - 4833KB

Étude Op. 25, No. 7 in C♯ minor is a solo piano technical study composed by Frédéric Chopin in 1834. Markedly different from Chopin's overall scheme of technical virtuosity, this étude focuses instead on perfect sound and phrasing, particularly for the left hand.

== Structure ==
Étude Op. 25, No. 7 is at a Lento tempo, 66 BPM according to the German first edition. Excepting measures 26, 27, and 52, which contain a rapid passage for the left hand, the étude is very straightforward and elementary in rhythm, but not in harmony. The theme is repeated four times throughout the piece; interspersed between are modulated variations of other melodies and cadences.
