= Étude Op. 25, No. 10 (Chopin) =

Étude written by Chopin

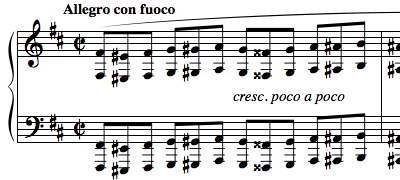
Excerpt from the Étude Op. 25, No. 10

Étude Op. 25, No. 10, in B minor is a solo piano study composed by Frédéric Chopin in 1835.

== Structure ==
Étude Op. 25, No. 10 features many unique aspects not typically present in Chopin's études, including a significant and distinctive ternary form. The first theme is presented as a series of eighth note-tuplets in cut time, but not in 12/8 time, played at a very fast tempo of Allegro. The second theme is in B minor's parallel major, B major, and in triple metre. The second theme is repeated four times, and develops into a variation of the first theme, returning to cut time and B minor.

Copious pedal point notes and phrase markings are present in the second theme, but the entire étude lacks any pedal indications. Similar to the Op. 10, No. 4 étude, Chopin emphasizes legato playing through the phrasing and (lack of) pedal marking. Throughout the entire work, Chopin marks only five dynamic markings; the entire first theme is to be played forte to fortissimo, and the whole second theme is piano.
