= XVIII International Chopin Piano Competition =

Piano competition (2021)

The Eighteenth International Fryderyk Chopin Piano Competition
- Official poster
- Date: 12–23 July 2021 (preliminary round); 2–23 October 2021 (main stage)
- Venue: National Philharmonic, Warsaw
- Hosted by: Fryderyk Chopin Institute
- Winner: (Canada) Bruce Liu
- Website: chopin2020.pl/en/

The XVIII International Chopin Piano Competition (Polish: XVIII Międzynarodowy Konkurs Pianistyczny im. Fryderyka Chopina) was held from 2 to 23 October 2021 in Warsaw. Originally scheduled for 2020, the quinquennial competition was twice postponed due to the COVID-19 pandemic.

87 pianists from 18 countries took part in the main stage of the competition, which was divided into three stages with 87, 45 and 23 participants each, and a final with twelve pianists. The first prize was awarded to Bruce Liu of Canada.

== Background ==
The competition was originally scheduled to take place from 2 to 23 October 2020, with the preliminary round to be held from 17 to 28 April. In May 2020, the competition was postponed to the same dates in 2021 due to the COVID-19 pandemic. This was decided by Poland's Minister of Culture and National Heritage, Piotr Gliński, together with Artur Szklener, director of the Fryderyk Chopin Institute in Warsaw, after additional consultations with Poland's Ministry of Health. In January 2021, Szklener announced that the preliminary round would be postponed to July.

== Awards ==
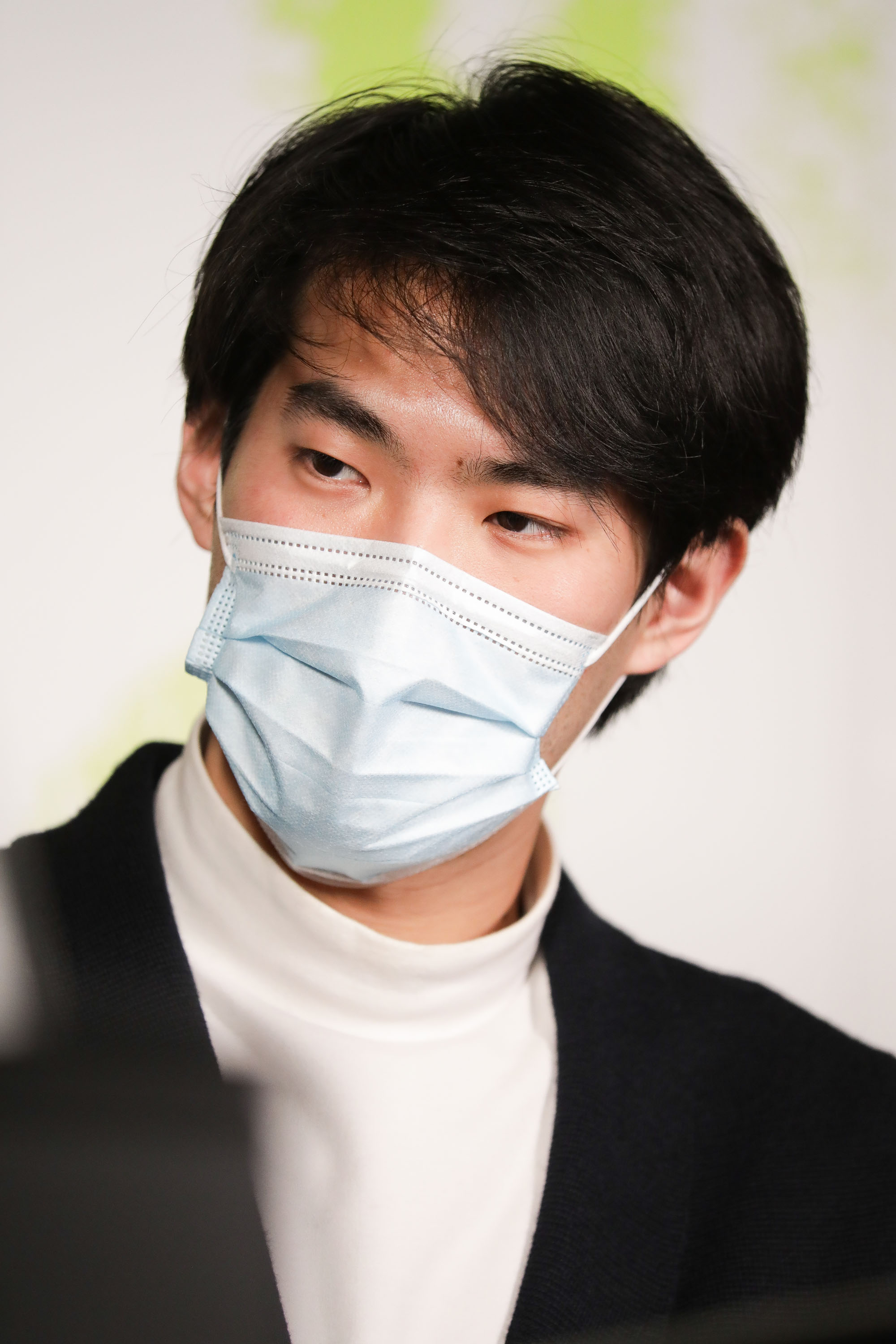
Bruce Liu of Canada won the competition

The jury awarded eight main prizes to the finalists of the competition. The first prize went to Bruce Liu of Canada. The second prize was jointly awarded, ex aequo, to Alexander Gadjiev and Kyohei Sorita, while the third prize went to Martín García García. The fourth prize was shared, ex aequo, by Aimi Kobayashi and Jakub Kuszlik, the fifth prize was awarded to Leonora Armellini, and the sixth prize went to J J Jun Li Bui.

Artur Szklener, director of the Chopin Institute, announced that three pianists had identical scores, leading to very long debates among the jury. The winner of the competition, however, was unambiguously decided.

Prize		Winner	
1st place, gold medalist(s)	€40,000	Bruce Liu	Canada
2nd place, silver medalist(s)	€30,000	Alexander Gadjiev	Italy Slovenia
2nd place, silver medalist(s)	€30,000	Kyohei Sorita	Japan
3rd place, bronze medalist(s)	€20,000	Martín García García	Spain
4th	€15,000	Aimi Kobayashi	Japan
4th	€15,000	Jakub Kuszlik	Poland
5th	€10,000	Leonora Armellini	Italy
6th	€7,000	J J Jun Li Bui	Canada
F	€4,000	Eva Gevorgyan	Russia Armenia
F	€4,000	Hyuk Lee	South Korea
F	€4,000	Kamil Pacholec	Poland
F	€4,000	Hao Rao	China

In addition, three of the four special prizes were awarded.

Special prize		Founder	Winner	
Best Performance of a Concerto	€5,000	Warsaw Philharmonic	Martín García García	Spain
Best Performance of Mazurkas	€5,000	Polish Radio	Jakub Kuszlik	Poland
Best Performance of a Polonaise	€5,000	Fryderyk Chopin Society	not awarded	
Best Performance of a Sonata	€10,000	Krystian Zimerman	Alexander Gadjiev	Italy Slovenia

== Preliminary stage ==
The preliminary stage was held from 12 to 23 July 2021 in the Chamber Hall of the National Philharmonic in Warsaw. Participants were required to perform the following works:

Preliminary stage program
One of: Étude Op. 10, No. 1; Étude Op. 10, No. 4; Étude Op. 10, No. 5; Étude Op. 10, No. 8; Étude Op. 10, No. 12; Étude Op. 25, No. 11	One of: Étude Op. 10, No. 2; Étude Op. 10, No. 7; Étude Op. 10, No. 10; Étude Op. 10, No. 11; Étude Op. 25, No. 4; Étude Op. 25, No. 5; Étude Op. 25, No. 6; Étude Op. 25, No. 10	One of: Nocturnes, Op. 9, No. 3; Nocturnes, Op. 27, No. 1 or 2; Nocturnes, Op. 37, No. 2; Nocturnes, Op. 48, No. 1 or 2; Nocturnes, Op. 55, No. 2; Nocturnes, Op. 62, No. 1 or 2; Étude Op. 10, No. 3; Étude Op. 10, No. 6; Étude Op. 25, No. 7	One of: Ballade No. 1, Op. 23; Ballade No. 2, Op. 38; Ballade No. 3, Op. 47; Ballade No. 4, Op. 52; Barcarolle, Op. 60; Fantaisie, Op. 49	Two Mazurkas from: Mazurkas, Op. 17; Mazurkas, Op. 24; Mazurkas, Op. 30; Mazurkas, Op. 33; Mazurkas, Op. 41; Mazurkas, Op. 50; Mazurkas, Op. 56; Mazurkas, Op. 59

Ultimately, 151 contestants performed in the preliminary stage, of which the jury admitted 78 to the main stage. They were joined by an additional nine pianists, who qualified to the main stage directly by winning major piano competitions.

Competitors of the preliminary round
Competitor	Country	Result
Leonora Armellini	Italy	To Stage I
Anfisa Bobylova	Ukraine	
J J Jun Li Bui	Canada	To Stage I
Łukasz Byrdy	Poland	
Michelle Candotti	Italy	To Stage I
Luigi Carroccia	Italy	
Kai-Min Chang	Taiwan	To Stage I
Han Chen	Taiwan	
Junhui Chen	China	To Stage I
Xuehong Chen	China	To Stage I
Zixi Chen	China	To Stage I
Hyounglok Choi	South Korea	To Stage I
Martina Consonni	Italy	
Diana Cooper	France	
Federico Gad Crema	Italy	To Stage I
Aleksandra Hortensja Dąbek	Poland	To Stage I
Stephanie Draughon	United States	
Hsin-Yu Duan	Taiwan	
Mateusz Duda	Poland	
Alberto Ferro	Italy	To Stage I
Yasuko Furumi	Japan	To Stage I
Alexander Gadjiev	Italy; Slovenia	To Stage I
Martín García García	Spain	To Stage I
Eva Gevorgyan	Russia; Armenia	To Stage I
Jorge González Buajasan	Cuba	To Stage I
Joanna Goranko	Poland	To Stage I
Chelsea Guo	United States	To Stage I
Xu Guo	China	
Eric Guo	Canada	To Stage I
Katharina Hack	Germany	
Chi Ho Han	South Korea	
Saaya Hara	Japan	To Stage I
Yukino Hayashi	Japan	
Wataru Hisasue	Japan	
Yifan Hou	China	To Stage I
Wei-Ting Hsieh	Taiwan	To Stage I
Yun-Chih Hsu	Taiwan	
Kaoruko Igarashi	Japan	To Stage I
Hana Igawa	Japan	
Riko Imai	Japan	To Stage I
Grigoris Ioannou	Greece	
Seika Ishida	Japan	
Junichi Ito	Japan	To Stage I
Andrei Ivanou	Belarus	
Asaki Iwai	Japan	To Stage I
San Jittakarn	Thailand	To Stage I
Joo-Yeon Ka	South Korea	To Stage I
Yukino Kaihara	Japan	
Hyelee Kang	South Korea	
Hyelee Kang	South Korea	
Elizabeth Karaulova	Russia	
Airi Katada	Japan	
Eylam Keshet	Israel	
Konstantin Khachikyan	Russia	
Nikolay Khozyainov	Russia	To Stage I
Hyelim Kim	South Korea	
Jun Ho Kim	South Korea	
Su Yeon Kim	South Korea	To Stage I
Yurika Kimura	Japan	
Aimi Kobayashi	Japan	To Stage I
Qi Kong	China	
Pavle Krstic	Bulgaria	
Mateusz Krzyżowski	Poland	To Stage I
Yukine Kuroki	Japan	
Jakub Kuszlik	Poland	To Stage I
Shushi Kyomasu	Japan	To Stage I
Hyuk Lee	South Korea	To Stage I
Jaeyoon Lee	South Korea	To Stage I
Xinjie Li	China	
Ning Yuen Li	Hong Kong	
Xiaoxuan Li	China	To Stage I
Hao Wei Lin	Taiwan	
Bruce Liu	Canada	To Stage I
Ziyu Liu	China	
Julia Łozowska	Poland	To Stage I
Xuanyi Mao	China	To Stage I
Tomasz Marut	Poland	To Stage I
Yupeng Mei	China	To Stage I
Asaka Miyoshi	Japan	
Momoko Mizutani	Japan	
Arsenii Mun	Russia	To Stage I
Mayaka Nakagawa	Japan	
Yui Nakamura	Japan	
Việt Trung Nguyễn	Vietnam; Poland	To Stage I
Mariko Nogami	Japan	
Arisa Onoda	Japan	
Georgijs Osokins	Latvia	To Stage I
Anke Pan	Germany	
Eryk Parchański	Poland	
Jinhyung Park	South Korea	To Stage I
Yeonmin Park	South Korea	To Stage I
Jiana Peng	China	To Stage I
Leonardo Pierdomenico	Italy	To Stage I
Zuzanna Pietrzak	Poland	To Stage I
Agnė Radzevičiūtė	Canada; Lithuania	
Hao Rao	China	To Stage I
Yangyang Ruan	China	To Stage I
Kazuya Saito	Japan	
Cristian Sandrin	Romania	
Sohgo Sawada	Japan	To Stage I
Aristo Sham	Hong Kong	To Stage I
Meng-Sheng Shen	Taiwan	
Kotaro Shigemori	Japan	
Miyu Shindo	Japan	To Stage I
Mana Shoji	Japan	
Talon Smith	United States	To Stage I
Kyohei Sorita	Japan	To Stage I
Vitaly Starikov	Russia	
Szu-Yu Su	Taiwan	To Stage I
Hayato Sumino	Japan	To Stage I
Aleksandra Świgut	Poland	To Stage I
Marcel Tadokoro	France	
Rikono Takeda	Japan	To Stage I
Shunshun Tie	China	To Stage I
Mateusz Tomica	Poland	
Sarah Tuan	United States	To Stage I
Parker Van Ostrand	United States	
Mónika Ruth Vida	Hungary	
Chao Wang	China	To Stage I
Zitong Wang	China	To Stage I
Bocheng Wang	United Kingdom	
Chanel Wang	United States	
Yijia Wang	China	
Liya Wang	China	
Zijian Wei	China	To Stage I
Jacek Wendler	Poland	
Marcin Wieczorek	Poland	To Stage I
Andrzej Wierciński	Poland	To Stage I
Victoria Wong	Canada	To Stage I
Sze Yuen Wong	Hong Kong	
Maciej Wota	Poland	
Maiqi Wu	China	
Yuchong Wu	China	To Stage I
Lingfei (Stephan) Xie	China	To Stage I
Biguo Xing	China	
Zi Xu	China	To Stage I
Miki Yamagata	Japan	
Yuanfan Yang	United Kingdom	To Stage I
Anastasia Yasko	Russia	To Stage I
Suah Ye	South Korea	
Shih-Hsien Yeh	Taiwan	
Yi Yi	China	
Hao Zi Yoh	Malaysia	
Se-Hyeong Yoo	South Korea	
Jessica Yuma	Canada	
Andrey Zenin	Russia	To Stage I
Boao Zhang	China	To Stage I
Yilan Zhao	China	To Stage I
Kaiwen Zhao	China	
Ziji Zoé Zhao	China	To Stage I
Tianyu Zhou	Canada	

An additional nine pianists qualified to the main stage directly by winning major piano competitions:

Competitors admitted directly into the main stage
Competitor	Country	Admission through
Piotr Alexewicz	Poland	(gold) 2020 Polish Fryderyk Chopin Piano Competition
Avery Gagliano	United States	(gold) 2020 National Chopin Piano Competition of the USA
Adam Kałduński	Poland	(gold) 2019 Beijing International Fryderyk Chopin Piano Competition for Young Pianists; (silver) 2020 Polish Fryderyk Chopin Piano Competition
Szymon Nehring	Poland	(silver) 2017 Arthur Rubinstein International Piano Master Competition
Evren Ozel	United States	(silver) 2020 National Chopin Piano Competition of the USA
Kamil Pacholec	Poland	(silver) 2019 International Paderewski Piano Competition
Piotr Pawlak	Poland	(gold) 2017 Darmstadt International Chopin Piano Competition; (silver) 2020 Polish Fryderyk Chopin Piano Competition
Yutong Sun	China	(silver) 2018 Santander International Piano Competition
Tomoharu Ushida	Japan	(silver) 2018 Hamamatsu International Piano Competition

== Main stage ==
The main competition from 3 to 20 October consisted of three stages and a final. An inaugural concert was held on 2 October, and the prize-winners' concerts took place from 21 to 23 October.

Stage I was held from 3–7 October 2021 and was contested by 87 participants. Stage II was held from 9–12 October 2021 and was contested by 45 participants. Stage III was held from 14 to 16 October 2021 and was contested by 23 participants. The final was held from 18 to 20 October 2021 and was contested by twelve participants.

Calendar (CEST)
3 Oct	4 Oct	5 Oct	6 Oct	7 Oct	8 Oct	9 Oct	10 Oct	11 Oct	12 Oct	13 Oct	14 Oct	15 Oct	16 Oct	17 Oct	18 Oct	19 Oct	20 Oct
Stage I 10:00 (morning session); 17:00 (evening session)						Stage II 10:00 (morning session); 17:00 (evening session)					Stage III 10:00 (morning session); 17:00 (evening session)				Final 18:00		

=== Summary ===
==== Stage I ====
The first pianist to perform in Stage I was Xuanyi Mao of China. The letter "M" was drawn with a lottery machine by Piotr Gliński, the Polish Minister of Culture, at a press conference a week earlier.

Polish Radio commentators described Szymon Nehring's playing as "extremely mature", completely different than the previous competition, where he had been a finalist. Jed Distler from Gramophone noted that Georgijs Osokins' performance was "strikingly individual", with an "epic sense of time scale" akin to Emil Gilels. Japanese pianist Sohgo Sawada was called the best performer of the first day's evening session, possessing "disarmingly sincerity" in his performance of the Ballade in G minor. On the second day, the performance of Talon Smith of the United States was unanimously praised by the Polish Radio, and he was described as a "very musical pianist with a great imagination". Distler called Smith one of those youngsters who sound "wise beyond their years", approaching Chopin as "a master pianist with an old soul". On Day 3, commentators highlighted the "Italian dominance" of the day, with Leonora Armellini, who made the greatest impression, particularly in her performance of the Etude in C♯ minor, and Michelle Candotti. Distler praised Armellini's "liquid sonority" and "flexible phrasing", in complete command of her chosen Fazioli piano. Italian-Slovenian pianist Alexander Gadjiev drew attention on the fourth day. Róża Światczyńska of the Polish Radio remarked: "He is coming here because he has something to say from himself, a very coherent vision of music, and he wants to pass it on to us regardless of how he is judged." Gadjiev's performance of the études was particularly praised. Distler described 17-year-old Yifan Hou as having "power, personality, style, technique, communicative immediacy and natural musicality", noting the "shocking" impact of his "compact, dramatic and kinetically fervent" performance of the first Ballade.

From the first stage, 45 pianists were admitted to the second stage, five more than originally prescribed in the competition format. Commentators remarked that some score differences were likely minimal and that it might have been too harsh to eliminate some participants.

==== Stage II ====
Compared to the first stage, where the program was largely fixed, participants were allowed a greater deal of freedom in the second stage, which has been described as more of a recital that tests the ability to arrange a program, and thereby the maturity of the pianist. The most praised participants of Day 6 were Kyohei Sorita of Japan, with a "well-structured program", and 17-year-old Hao Rao from China, who possessed "genuinely sincere emotionality". Yuchong Wu of China, who performed all waltzes of Op. 34, was described by Polish Radio commentators as the best performer of the first session of Day 7, and was particularly praised for his performance of the Waltz in A minor. For Distler, Tomoharu Ushida provided the day's "most pleasant surprise", giving a "masterclass in horizontal clarity and the spacing of notes in time". On Day 8, 17-year-old Russian-Armenian pianist Eva Gevorgyan roused interest, Andrzej Sułek from the Polish Radio remarking: "She is growing into a very important figure in this competition. I wonder if this is a pianist who is going for the first prize. A great success of the Chopin Competition is the arrival of an artist of such caliber." On Day 9, Polish Radio commentators highlighted Nikolay Khozyainov's "unusually well-thought-out and intricately constructed repertoire" that he managed to "realize on stage one hundred percent". The last pianist to perform that day was Bruce Liu of Canada, described to be among those "in the starting positions to attack the first place". Marcin Majchrowski of the Polish Radio remarked that he could not hide his emotions after Liu's performance, and that one could feel the "unimaginable tension and silence of listening to something special in the concert hall of the National Philharmonic".

After the second stage, 23 pianists qualified to the third stage, including six from Poland, five from Japan, three from Italy, two each from Canada, Russia, South Korea, and one each from the United States, China, and Spain. The number of participants admitted to the next stage again exceeded the number 20 originally prescribed in the competition format. Jury chairwoman Katarzyna Popowa-Zydroń stated in an interview that all jury members agreed that it was necessary to listen to a larger group of participants.

==== Stage III ====
In the third stage, pianists perform a complete set of mazurkas, a piano sonata (excluding the first) or the complete set of Preludes Op. 28, and any other compositions of Chopin to fill the remaining time. On Day 10, Polish Radio commentators highlighted the performance of Miyu Shindo from Japan. Sułek proclaimed her "some kind of Japanese priestess of the god of time", with the "fantastic ability to stop a chord from sounding or a phrase from closing, sounds vibrating, floating in the air like Debussy's, like a drop of watercolor in a glass of water". On Day 11, J J Jun Li Bui was praised for his performance of mazurkas and the Sonata in B minor, Światczyńska calling him a candidate for the Special Prize for the Best Performance of Mazurkas, which is awarded by the Polish Radio. In the evening session, Alexander Gadjiev's individualism was once again highlighted, some wondering why he came to the Chopin competition at all. Światczyńska remarked that he "is of a completely non-competitive type, not falling within the bounds of objective assessment", the question being whether his performance went "beyond the limits of good taste". At the end of the day, Majchrowski praised Eva Gevorgyan, calling her performance "one that will go down in competition history". On Day 12, Nikolay Khozyainov was called "one of the absolute favorites to win the competition", being described as a "mature, conscious pianist, intellectual pianist " with an "interestingly structured, coherent program". The third stage concluded with the performance of Canadian Bruce Liu, noted by Sułek as a pianist with "inexhaustible imagination", performing an "excellent recital".

From the third stage, twelve pianists from ten countries qualified for the final, two more than prescribed in the competition rules. Artur Szklener, director of the Chopin Institute, explained that "the substantive argument was that the participants ranked 10th, 11th and 12th very were close in terms of points. After checking the organizational possibilities with the National Philharmonic Orchestra, the jury came to the conclusion that the best solution would be to allow an increased number of 12 pianists." Sułek commented that the finalists constituted an "unprecented" mosaic of pianists, a "rich gallery of characters, pianistic individualities, among whom there are amazing phenomena". Światczyńska highlighted the "extremely different artistic personalities", noting that the jury's "range of tastes and criteria" was quite wide this year.

==== Final ====
The final was held over three days, four pianists presenting one of Chopin's two piano concertos on each day, accompanied by the Warsaw National Philharmonic Orchestra conducted by Andrzej Boreyko.

Day 1

Kamil Pacholec of Poland was the first to perform. Sułek wondered about his experience with an orchestra, noting that Pacholec tended to follow the orchestra rather imposing certain musical thoughts on it. John Allison, writing for the competition daily Chopin Courier, praised Pacholec's "elegantly poised playing", yet noted that his performance "got weighted down", particularly in the slow movement. Distler called Pacholec's performance "steady" but "smaller-scaled" than his competitors.

Hao Rao of China was the second participant. Przemysław Psikuta of the Polish Radio noted that Rao, like Pacholec before him, seemed to play in a more classical, traditional way, "physical elements dominating over poetry". Allison noted that the middle movement was a particular highlight of Rao's performance, and that he projected it with "fully expressive, bel canto feeling". For Distler, the "effervescent and nimble" Rondo stood out the most.

Kyohei Sorita of Japan followed after an intermission. Majchrowski called his Romance "simply extraordinary", with nuances and an emphasis on the details of the score, and recognized him as the best performer of the day. Allison highlighted Sorita's "developed artistic personality" that secured him a "spacious performance" with "well-managed rubato". In Distler's view, Sorita demonstrated "an altogether higher level of pianistic cultivation" with his "variegated turns of phrase, subtle transitions and wider dynamic range".

Leonora Armellini of Italy concluded the first day. Sułek called her performance the best of the session, rating her a little higher than Sorita in terms of pianistic value. Allison called her performance "satisfying", writing that it felt like "being at a good concert", though noting that her Rondo was not the "most successful of the lot". Distler was captivated by Armellini's "warm and soaring tone, natural musicality, spontaneity and unalloyed joy in just being at the keyboard", noting that she "truly listened to her fellow musicians", though the Rondo's coda "didn't sparkle so brightly as expected".

Day 2

J J Jun Li Bui of Canada was the first to perform on the second day of the final. Sułek was disappointed by his performance, expecting an early Chopin-Warsaw style that defined his performance of the Rondo à la mazur in the previous stage. Sułek also highlighted Bui's apparent inexperience with an orchestra, and had the impression that Bui was focused on himself, not communicating well with the conductor and orchestra. Światczyńska praised Bui's "extremely poetic" moments in the Romance. Krzysztof Stefański, writing for the Chopin Courier, found praise for Bui's "warm, round tone" and "impressionist hues above the clarity of his arpeggio". Distler criticized Bui's playing as being too "uniform, machine-like", "ploughing through Chopin's bravura writing like the proverbial horse with blinders".

Alexander Gadjiev of Italy and Slovenia was the first to play the Piano Concerto in F minor. Światczyńska liked his sound and his "ability to operate within wide planes", but criticized his "manneristic pathos and affectation" that "contradict Chopin's expression". Sułek noted that Gadjiev's "wild nature" worked better in solo works, whereas in the concerto it caused the "narrative to become too fragmented". Stefański found that Gadjiev "played with a large sound, as if echoing the pianist's Romantic individualism". Distler found praise for Gadjiev's performance: "He illuminated the opening Maestoso movement's salient points by executing decorative passages in tempo, while demarcating melodies with discreet rubato and sophisticated accentuation. Gadjiev's seamless legato and multi-leveled dynamic control transformed the Larghetto into an aria where the piano's hammers seemed to have replaced by lungs."

Martín García García of Spain followed with the same concerto. Światczyńska was initially concerned with García's fearful appearance, but thought that he surprised many people with a good performance having "beautiful moments". Stefański described García's playing as "bathed in a gentle morning light", continuously displaying "Chopin's sunny side", playing "lightly, with an incredible songfulness and cultured tone". Distler remarked that García' seemed "held back on a leash" compared to his "impetuous, risk-taking solo performances" in the earlier stages of the competition, calling it "lovely by any standard" but with too little adventurousness to rival Gadjiev's "penetrating interpretation". In contrast, three of five music critics for the Polish music magazine Ruch Muzyczny called García's the best concerto performer: Szymon Atys called him his favorite pianist of the competition, Anna Chęćka highlighted his "surprisingly fresh and seductive vision" of the concerto, and Dariusz Marciniszyn remarked that García "enchanted" him completely, bringing forth "hidden melodic and harmonic dependencies" in the Rondo.

Eva Gevorgyan of Russia and Armenia concluded the session. Sułek noted that she "delighted" him, but did not "seduce" him until the second part. Stefański praised her "clear sense of direction", with each broken chord serving "a higher structural goal". For Distler, Gevorgyan was a "performance of eloquence, nobility and substance", evoking memories of "notable Russian luminaries like Emil Gilels and Bella Davidovich".

Day 3

Aimi Kobayashi of Japan opened the final day of the competition. Światczyńska remarked that Kobayashi did not seem to have the best day, wondering if the level expectations were becoming psychologically difficult to bear. Allison highlighted the delicacy and intimacy of her performance, though noting that her tempos might not endear her to critics. Distler highlighted Kobayashi's "micro-management and tense finger-orientated pianism". Two of five authors of Ruch Muzyczny called Kobayashi the best performer of a concerto. Marcin Bogucki praised her "romantic vision", though noting a few slip-ups in the finale. Krzysztof Stefański remarked that "time stopped for a moment. Her fingers flew lightly over the keyboard, even when she was building the climaxes, she did not reach for a strong forte. The lunar fragment of Romanza sounded like a wonderful improvisation. It was hard not to fall in love."

Jakub Kuszlik of Poland gave a performance that was assessed by Polish Radio commentators as another "step up". Światczyńska admired his composure and ability to focus, though feeling a certain lack of "poetic expression and color differentiation" Allison called his performance "straightforward", with "impressively fleet passage work", but also noting that he went "under the surface, into the realms of that uniquely Polish spirit of żal". Distler praised Kuszlik's "red-blooded, forward-moving" performance.

Hyuk Lee of South Korea brought the day's only performance of the Concerto in F minor. Allison criticized Lee's tone as being "too brittle", noting that he sounded "less than completely at ease". Stefański wrote that Lee seemed to reject the "romantic character" of the middle Larghetto, though playing the recitative fragments poignantly.

Bruce Liu of Canada was the final performer. Allison praised Liu's performance for "holding poetry and virtuosity in wonderful balance", the "dreaminess of the Romance" sustaining "right to the dying last note". Distler called his performance "effortless, insouciant yet relatively straightforward". Stefański called Liu the "undisputed favorite of critics and the audience", remarking: "He is a complete pianist – he has excellent technique, and he uses it to conjure up the most fascinating timbres on the Fazioli piano. You can write about his perfect brillante, his ability to produce a soft sound without the sustain pedal, his wonderfully rocking rubato, his great control of the dynamics, but also his ability to create form, as in the ever-increasing passages that end the first movement. And sometimes the pianist played in such a way that the critic's pen stood still – helpless, unable to find the right words for what he was hearing."

=== Program ===
Participants were required to select a different program for each stage of the competition. The competition repertoire had to be played from memory and could be performed in any order. Contestants were not allowed to play the same piece again in different stages of the competition, though they could perform pieces they performed in the preliminary round (except the first two etudes) in the main stage. Participants could use any available edition of Chopin's works, though they were recommended to use the Chopin National Edition.

Competition program
Stage I program
One of: Étude Op. 10, No. 1; Étude Op. 10, No. 4; Étude Op. 10, No. 5; Étude Op. 10, No. 8; Étude Op. 10, No. 12; Étude Op. 25, No. 11	One of: Étude Op. 10, No. 2; Étude Op. 10, No. 7; Étude Op. 10, No. 10; Étude Op. 10, No. 11; Étude Op. 25, No. 4; Étude Op. 25, No. 5; Étude Op. 25, No. 6; Étude Op. 25, No. 10	One of: Nocturnes, Op. 9, No. 3; Nocturnes, Op. 27, No. 1 or 2; Nocturnes, Op. 37, No. 2; Nocturnes, Op. 48, No. 1 or 2; Nocturnes, Op. 55, No. 2; Nocturnes, Op. 62, No. 1 or 2; Étude Op. 10, No. 3; Étude Op. 10, No. 6; Étude Op. 25, No. 7	One of: Ballade No. 1, Op. 23; Ballade No. 2, Op. 38; Ballade No. 3, Op. 47; Ballade No. 4, Op. 52; Barcarolle, Op. 60; Fantaisie, Op. 49; Scherzo No. 1, Op. 20; Scherzo No. 2, Op. 31; Scherzo No. 3, Op. 39; Scherzo No. 4, Op. 54
Stage II program
One of: Ballade No. 1, Op. 23; Ballade No. 2, Op. 38; Ballade No. 3, Op. 47; Ballade No. 4, Op. 52; Barcarolle, Op. 60; Fantaisie, Op. 49; Scherzo No. 1, Op. 20; Scherzo No. 2, Op. 31; Scherzo No. 3, Op. 39; Scherzo No. 4, Op. 54; Polonaise-Fantaisie, Op. 61	One of: Grande valse brillante, Op. 18; Waltzes, Op. 34, No. 1 or 3; Waltz, Op. 42; Waltz, Op. 64, No. 3	One of: Andante spianato et grande polonaise brillante, Op. 22; Polonaise, Op. 44; Polonaise, Op. 53; Polonaises, Op. 26 (both)	Any other pieces by Chopin to meet the required performing time of 30 to 40 minutes
Stage III program
One of: Piano Sonata No. 2, Op. 35; Piano Sonata No. 3, Op. 58; Preludes, Op. 28 (all)		Full set of: Mazurkas, Op. 17; Mazurkas, Op. 24; Mazurkas, Op. 30; Mazurkas, Op. 33; Mazurkas, Op. 41; Mazurkas, Op. 50; Mazurkas, Op. 56; Mazurkas, Op. 59	Any other pieces by Chopin to meet the required performing time of 45 to 55 minutes
Final program
Piano Concerto No. 1, Op. 11 or Piano Concerto No. 2, Op. 21

In the first stage, pianists most often chose the Étude in G♯ minor, Op. 25 No. 6, the Ballade No. 4 in F minor (18 pianists each), as well as the Étude in C major, Op. 10 No. 1, and the Nocturne in B major, Op. 62 No. 1 (17 pianists each). No participant at this stage chose the Nocturne in G major, Op. 37 No. 2.

In the second stage, the most played pieces were the Andante spianato et grande polonaise brillante (18 pianists), the Waltz in F major, Op. 34 No. 3 (16 pianists), as well as the Barcarolle in F♯ major and the Polonaise in A♭ major, Op. 53 (15 pianists each). Scherzo No. 4 was played by only one pianist (Hyounglok Choi), as were the Polonaises, Op. 26 (Federico Gad Crema). From additional pieces supplementing the repertoire program of this stage, pianists most frequently chose the Rondo à la mazur (5 pianists), the Waltz in A minor, Op. 34 No. 2, and the Nocturne in C minor, Op. 48 No. 1 (3 pianists).

In the third stage, most participants selected the Piano Sonata No. 3 (12 pianists), Piano Sonata No. 2 (8 pianists), and the Mazurkas Op. 24 and Mazurkas Op. 56 (5 pianists each). Of the additional pieces supplementing the repertoire program of this stage, the pianists most frequently chose the Fantaisie in F minor and the Polonaise-Fantaisie (3 pianists each).

In the finale, nine pianists decided to perform the Piano Concerto No. 1, and three chose the Piano Concerto No. 2.

=== Piano selection ===
Before the start of the competition, each participant was allotted a timeslot of 15 minutes to choose an instrument. Participants could choose between a Yamaha, a Kawai, a Fazioli and two Steinway pianos. Once selected, participants may not change pianos between the rounds. Out of 87 participants of the first round, 43 chose the Steinway ending with serial number 479, 21 the Steinway ending with number 300, nine the Yamaha, eight the Fazioli and six the Kawai.

Brand		Model	Serial number
S^{1}	Steinway & Sons	D-274	611479
S^{2}	Steinway & Sons	D-274	612300
Y	Yamaha	CFX	6524400
F	Fazioli	F278	2782230
K	Kawai	SK-EX	2718001

== Results ==
Yes: percentage of jurors who voted to pass the participant to the next round, excluding recusals

Pts: adjusted average number of points, excluding recusals

Scorings were released after the end of the competition, excluding those from the final.

Competitor results
Competitor	Country	P	Stage I			Stage II			Stage III			Final
Competitor	Country	P	Yes	Pts	→II	Yes	Pts	→III	Yes	Pts	→F	Result
Bruce Liu	Canada	F	100%	23.00	Yes	100%	23.03	Yes	100%	23.22	Yes	1
Alexander Gadjiev	Italy; Slovenia	K	94%	22.66	Yes	76%	21.41	Yes	88%	21.75	Yes	2
Kyohei Sorita	Japan	S^{1}	80%	20.40	Yes	88%	21.50	Yes	80%	21.57	Yes	2
Martín García García	Spain	F	56%	19.91	Yes	76%	20.14	Yes	69%	21.09	Yes	3
Jakub Kuszlik	Poland	S^{1}	100%	21.67	Yes	88%	21.20	Yes	93%	22.00	Yes	4th
Aimi Kobayashi	Japan	S^{1}	94%	21.43	Yes	88%	20.47	Yes	81%	22.36	Yes	4th
Leonora Armellini	Italy	F	88%	21.05	Yes	71%	20.60	Yes	56%	20.55	Yes	5th
J J Jun Li Bui	Canada	K	100%	21.49	Yes	100%	22.91	Yes	67%	21.31	Yes	6th
Eva Gevorgyan	Russia; Armenia	S^{1}	100%	21.66	Yes	76%	20.04	Yes	88%	21.40	Yes	No
Kamil Pacholec	Poland	S^{1}	86%	19.92	Yes	67%	20.04	Yes	64%	20.43	Yes	No
Hao Rao	China	S^{1}	94%	21.69	Yes	65%	20.28	Yes	56%	20.22	Yes	No
Hyuk Lee	South Korea	K	67%	19.48	Yes	69%	19.91	Yes	53%	20.20	Yes	No
Su Yeon Kim	South Korea	S^{1}	88%	20.44	Yes	47%	19.82	Yes	50%	19.73	No	
Piotr Alexewicz	Poland	S^{1}	100%	20.69	Yes	76%	20.74	Yes	44%	20.22	No	
Miyu Shindo	Japan	S^{1}	75%	19.98	Yes	65%	19.72	Yes	44%	20.15	No	
Nikolay Khozyainov*	Russia	S^{2}	75%	19.34	Yes	76%	20.08	Yes	38%	19.57	No	
Szymon Nehring	Poland	S^{1}	100%	20.33	Yes	94%	21.47	Yes	33%	20.09	No	
Michelle Candotti	Italy	S^{1}	73%	19.24	Yes	94%	20.37	Yes	20%	19.22	No	
Hayato Sumino	Japan	S^{2}	63%	19.75	Yes	59%	20.30	Yes	19%	19.07	No	
Avery Gagliano	United States	S^{2}	75%	19.33	Yes	71%	19.60	Yes	19%	19.06	No	
Andrzej Wierciński	Poland	S^{2}	67%	19.48	Yes	50%	19.50	Yes	13%	19.35	No	
Yasuko Furumi	Japan	S^{1}	80%	19.57	Yes	56%	19.21	Yes	7%	19.21	No	
Mateusz Krzyżowski	Poland	S^{1}	69%	19.47	Yes	53%	19.25	Yes	0%	18.84	No	
Xuehong Chen	China	S^{1}	93%	20.87	Yes	44%	18.84	No				
Yuchong Wu	China	S^{2}	81%	21.06	Yes	41%	19.66	No				
Alberto Ferro	Italy	S^{2}	63%	18.80	Yes	41%	19.00	No				
Evren Ozel	United States	S^{1}	56%	18.80	Yes	41%	18.76	No				
Yutong Sun	China	S^{1}	80%	19.44	Yes	38%	19.31	No				
Shushi Kyomasu	Japan	Y	63%	19.63	Yes	35%	18.70	No				
Tomoharu Ushida	Japan	Y	56%	19.40	Yes	35%	18.33	No				
Việt Trung Nguyễn	Vietnam	S^{1}	71%	19.57	Yes	33%	18.55	No				
Kai-Min Chang	Taiwan	S^{2}	80%	19.64	Yes	31%	18.73	No				
Talon Smith	United States	S^{2}	67%	19.07	Yes	31%	18.38	No				
Georgijs Osokins	Latvia	Y	75%	19.56	Yes	29%	18.42	No				
Wei-Ting Hsieh	Taiwan	S^{1}	56%	18.78	Yes	24%	18.48	No				
Adam Kałduński	Poland	S^{1}	93%	20.13	Yes	19%	18.27	No				
Hyounglok Choi	South Korea	S^{1}	69%	18.84	Yes	18%	18.14	No				
Lingfei (Stephan) Xie	China	S^{2}	87%	19.45	Yes	18%	17.77	No				
Sohgo Sawada	Japan	K	56%	18.48	Yes	18%	17.76	No				
Zi Xu	China	S^{1}	79%	20.62	Yes	13%	17.99	No				
Federico Gad Crema	Italy	F	63%	18.95	Yes	12%	17.58	No				
Aristo Sham	Hong Kong	S^{2}	56%	19.20	Yes	6%	18.04	No				
Szu-Yu Su	Taiwan	S^{1}	69%	19.00	Yes	6%	17.63	No				
Arsenii Mun	Russia	Y	63%	18.25	Yes	0%	16.89	No				
Marcin Wieczorek	Poland	S^{1}	60%	18.99	Yes	Withdrew						
Shunshun Tie	China	S^{2}	50%	18.53	No							
Xiaoxuan Li	China	S^{2}	50%	18.44	No							
Riko Imai	Japan	S^{2}	50%	18.28	No							
Sarah Tuan	United States	S^{2}	50%	18.08	No							
Zuzanna Pietrzak	Poland	S^{1}	50%	18.06	No							
Jiana Peng	China	S^{1}	47%	18.44	No							
Chao Wang	China	Y	44%	19.04	No							
Eric Guo	Canada	S^{1}	44%	18.67	No							
Piotr Pawlak	Poland	S^{1}	44%	18.34	No							
Xuanyi Mao	China	S^{2}	44%	18.31	No							
Chelsea Guo	United States	F	44%	18.20	No							
Victoria Wong	Canada	S^{1}	38%	18.44	No							
Zixi Chen	China	S^{1}	38%	18.29	No							
Kaoruko Igarashi	Japan	S^{1}	38%	17.70	No							
Yifan Hou	China	S^{1}	38%	17.69	No							
Zijian Wei	China	S^{2}	38%	17.45	No							
Zitong Wang	China	S^{1}	33%	17.94	No							
Boao Zhang	China	K	33%	17.67	No							
Asaki Iwai	Japan	S^{2}	31%	18.27	No							
Yupeng Mei	China	Y	31%	18.14	No							
Jaeyoon Lee	South Korea	S^{1}	31%	17.81	No							
Yeonmin Park	South Korea	S^{1}	31%	17.80	No							
Jorge González Buajasan	Cuba	Y	31%	17.80	No							
Yuanfan Yang	United Kingdom	S^{2}	27%	17.72	No							
Julia Łozowska	Poland	S^{1}	25%	18.14	No							
Joanna Goranko	Poland	S^{1}	25%	17.86	No							
Junichi Ito	Japan	F	25%	17.47	No							
Jinhyung Park	South Korea	Y	25%	17.19	No							
Andrey Zenin	Russia	K	25%	16.88	No							
Aleksandra Świgut	Poland	F	14%	17.39	No							
Junhui Chen	China	S^{2}	13%	17.40	No							
Rikono Takeda	Japan	S^{2}	13%	17.00	No							
Yilan Zhao	China	S^{1}	13%	17.44	No							
Joo-Yeon Ka	South Korea	Y	13%	17.21	No							
Yangyang Ruan	China	S^{1}	13%	16.87	No							
Leonardo Pierdomenico	Italy	S^{1}	13%	16.81	No							
Tomasz Marut	Poland	S^{1}	6%	17.13	No							
Ziji Zoé Zhao	China	F	0%	17.13	No							
San Jittakarn	Thailand	S^{1}	0%	16.63	No							
Saaya Hara	Japan	S^{1}	0%	16.50	No							
Aleksandra Hortensja Dąbek	Poland	S^{2}	0%	16.38	No							
Anastasia Yasko	Russia	S^{1}	0%	14.16	No							

*Nikolay Khozyainov played on the Steinway ending in 300 for the first round, then switched to the Steinway ending in 479 for the remainder of the competition.

== Jury ==
There were three juries corresponding to each phase of the competition. The qualifying committee screened more than 500 video applications and admitted 164 candidates into the preliminary round. Of these, the preliminary round jury admitted 78 participants to the main stage, joined by nine pianists who qualified directly. The main competition jury narrowed the field of candidates further through three competition stages, culminating in a final with twelve pianists.

In all stages except the final, jurors gave candidates two assessments: a simple YES or NO on whether to accept the candidate into the next stage of the competition, and an integer score from 1 to 25 (25 being the highest). A YES required the juror to give at least 17 points for the preliminaries and 18, 19, and 20 points for Stage I, Stage II, and Stage III, respectively. When calculating the average score, scores were bounded within 3 points (preceding Stage II) or 2 points (Stage II and III) of the true average; for example, if the true average were 14.35 in Stage I, all scores lower than 12 would be adjusted to 11.35 and all scores higher than 17 would be adjusted to 17.35, and the average would then be calculated again. Based on these two assessments, but without the participants' names, the jury made the decision on admitting candidates to the next stage.

In the final, Jurors assessed candidates on a scale from 1 to 10, while the highest score of 10 was allowed to be given only once. Jurors were to take the candidate's performances in the preceding stages into account. As in the main stages, the score average was adjusted with a permitted difference of 2 points.

Jury members were compelled to recuse themselves from assessing a former or current student.

=== Qualifying committee ===
The qualifying committee consisted of:

- (Poland) Lech Dudzik
- (Poland) Janusz Olejniczak
- (Poland) Piotr Paleczny
- (Poland) Katarzyna Popowa-Zydroń (chairwoman)
- (Poland) Wojciech Świtała

=== Preliminary round jury ===
The preliminary round jury consisted of:

- (Bulgaria) Ludmil Angelov
- (France) Philippe Giusiano
- (Italy) Alberto Nosè
- (Poland) Piotr Paleczny
- (Poland) Ewa Pobłocka
- (Latvia) Dina Joffe
- (Poland) Katarzyna Popowa-Zydroń (chairwoman)
- (United States) John Rink
- (Poland) Marta Sosińska-Janczewska
- (Poland) Wojciech Świtała
- (Poland) Stefan Wojtas

=== Competition jury ===
The main competition jury consists of numerous pianists, many of whom were participants and prize-winners in previous editions of the Chopin Competition.

- (Russia) Dmitri Alexeev
- (China) Sa Chen (4th XIV)
- (Vietnam) (Canada) Đặng Thái Sơn ( (gold) X)
- (Japan) Akiko Ebi (5th X)
- (France) Philippe Giusiano ( (silver) XIII)
- (Argentina) Nelson Goerner (HM XIII)
- (Poland) Adam Harasiewicz ( (gold) V)
- (Poland) Krzysztof Jabłoński ( (bronze) XI)
- (United States) Kevin Kenner ( (silver) XII)
- (Brazil) Arthur Moreira Lima ( (silver) VII)
- (Poland) Janusz Olejniczak (6th VIII)
- (Poland) Piotr Paleczny ( (bronze) VIII)
- (Poland) Ewa Pobłocka (5th X)
- (Poland) Katarzyna Popowa-Zydroń (chairwoman; HM IX)
- (United States) John Rink
- (Poland) Wojciech Świtała (HM XII)
- (Latvia) Dina Joffe ( (silver) IX)

Nelson Freire and Martha Argerich withdrew prior to the start of the competition and were replaced by Arthur Moreira Lima.

== Controversy ==
Contestants from Taiwan were initially labeled as "PRC Taiwan" in a participant list that was published in March 2020 on the competition website. It was then later revised to "China Taiwan". However, after Taiwan's Representative Office in Warsaw lodged a protest, it was again revised to "Chinese Taipei", according to Taiwan's Ministry of Foreign Affairs, which cited that the designation issue was a result of political interference from Beijing, and that "Chinese Taipei", while not the designation Taiwan would prefer, would be "acceptable".

== Broadcasting ==
In Poland, the competition was broadcast on national channel TVP1 and on Polskie Radio Program II. All performances were also livestreamed on YouTube, and included, for the first time, a 4K broadcast and a virtual reality (VR) broadcast. In New York, London, Paris, Budapest, Moscow, Jerusalem, Seoul and Tokyo, the Adam Mickiewicz Institute collaborated with the Chopin Institute to create "listener's zones", where the competition was streamed in specially arranged spaces.
