= Sumino =

Sumino can refer to:

== Places ==
- Sumino (Russian: Сумино), a village in the Babushkinsky District of Vologda Oblast, Russia
- Sumino (Russian: Сумино), a village in the Cherepovetsky District of Vologda Oblast, Russia

== People ==
- Hayato Sumino (Japanese: 角野隼斗), Japanese pianist
- Naoko Yamazaki (Japanese: 山崎 直子), born Naoko Sumino, Japanese astronaut
- Yoru Sumino (Japanese: 住野よる), Japanese novelist
