= Fantasy in F minor =

Fantasy in F minor may refer to:

- Fantaisie in F minor (Chopin)
- Fantasia in F minor (Schubert)
