= Polonaise in A-flat major =

The Polonaise in A-flat major may refer to:

- The Polonaise in A-flat major, Op. 53, nicknamed Heroic
- The Polonaise-Fantaisie in A-flat major, Op. 61 by Frédéric Chopin
- A posthumous polonaise in A-flat major, composed in 1822 by Frédéric Chopin
