= Ballade No. 4 (Chopin) =

Composition for piano by Frederic Chopin

- Ballade by Frédéric Chopin
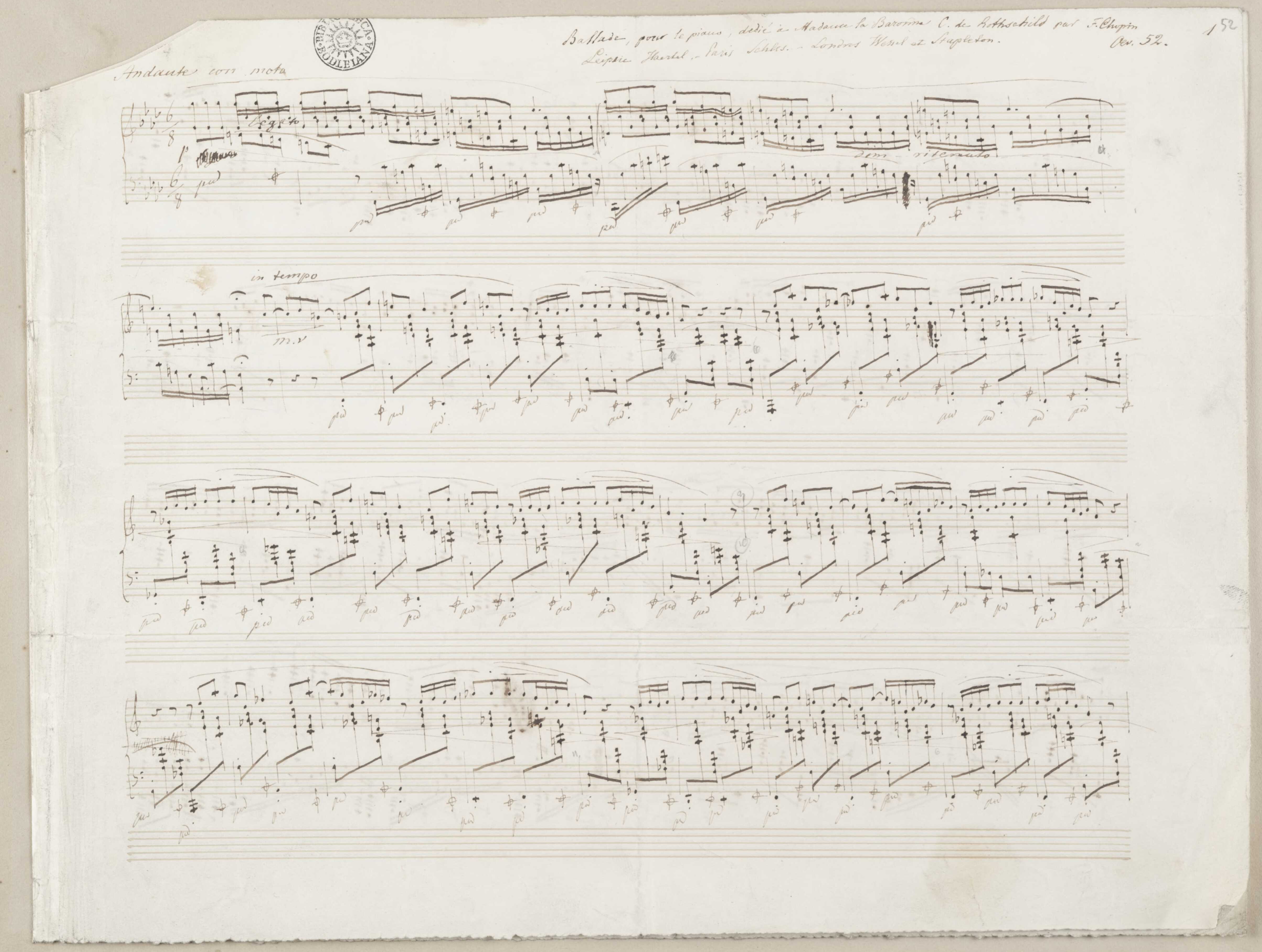
- Autograph manuscript, Bodleian Library, 1842
- Key: F minor
- Opus: 52
- Composed: 1842
- Dedication: Baroness Charlotte de Rothschild
- Published: 1843
- Duration: 10-12 minutes

The Ballade No. 4 in F minor, Op. 52 is a ballade for solo piano by Frédéric Chopin, completed in 1842 in Paris and published in 1843 with a dedication to Baroness Charlotte de Rothschild. Being his last published ballade, the piece is commonly considered one of the greatest masterpieces of piano music.

Although all four Chopin ballades are generally considered among the most highly demanding of Chopin's piano works both technically and musically, this ballade is considered by many pianists to be the most difficult of the four. It is also the longest, spanning around ten to twelve minutes in a typical performance. According to John Ogdon, it is "the most exalted, intense and sublimely powerful of all Chopin's compositions... It is unbelievable that it lasts only twelve minutes, for it contains the experience of a lifetime."

== History ==
The circumstances of composition of this ballade are poorly documented, though it appears that Chopin began composing shortly after the completion of Ballade No. 3. By December 1842, the ballade was finished, and he offered it for sale to Breitkopf & Härtel, along with the Heroic Polonaise and the fourth Scherzo.

The work was dedicated to Baroness Charlotte de Rothschild, wife of Nathaniel de Rothschild, who had invited Chopin to play in her Parisian residence, where she introduced him to the aristocracy and nobility.

In the preface to his edition of Chopin's ballades, Alfred Cortot claims that the inspiration for this ballade is Adam Mickiewicz's poem The Three Budrys, which tells of three brothers sent away by their father to seek treasures, and the story of their return with three Polish brides.

== Structure ==
A phrase in C major (marked piano) opens the seven introductory bars and leads into the first subject of sonata-form exposition. The first theme undergoes four cumulative transformations with decorations, counter-melodies, and a nocturne-like fioritura. The development of the second theme and its intertwining with the first heightens the complexity of the musical structure and builds tension. Through the intertwining and thus the simultaneous development of the two themes, Chopin effectively combines the use of both the sonata form and the variation form. The body of the piece concludes with a series of accented fortissimo chords, followed by a momentary calm of five pianissimo chords. This then suddenly leads into an extremely fast, turbulent coda, written in exuberant counterpoint. Structurally, Ballade No. 4 is vastly intricate.

=== Analysis ===
Ballade No. 4
Randolph Hokanson (11:17)

Ballade No. 4
Mónica Zubczuk (12:02)

A distinguishing feature of the fourth ballade is its contrapuntal nature. Counterpoint is found only sporadically in the first and second ballade. The fourth ballade is musically more subtle than the other three, as most of its portions remain melancholic and profound. Although there are some substantial outbursts in the central sections of the music, the coda reveals its greatest momentum.

Jim Samson provided a careful musical analysis of the ballade, characterizing its "purposeful ambivalence". Samson divides the complex structure into sections, starting with the bell-like Introduction, bars 1–7: the slow waltz in the first theme and variations — Theme I in F minor, bars 7–22, Variation I, bars 23–36, and Variation II, bars 58–71; and the second theme, Theme II in the subdominant B♭ major, bars 80–99, The pastoral second theme is a cross between a barcarolle and a chorale. This is followed by an episode in which the key passes to A♭ major. The return of the Introduction, in an unexpected key, is musically a moment of great pathos. As Samson writes: "The journey from this point to the reprise [of Theme II] is one of the most magical passages in Chopin. The main strands of Theme I are here isolated and presented in contrapuntal combination ... Moreover one of these strands is gradually and beautifully transformed into the unobtrusive return of the introduction in the remote foreground region of A major, a transition made possible by the shared repeated notes of the introduction and Theme I. This is the mid-point of the structure [and] enables his reprise to begin in the unexpected key of D minor."

This further variation of Theme I, Variation III, accomplishes the "canonic aspirations" of previous thematic material, revealing its dynamism and its progressively contrapuntal and polyphonic texture. According to Samson, "The tonal setting of the reprise proves ingeniously deceptive, exploiting the minor third sequence built into Theme I to return the music very quickly to the tonic. The canonic element is thus absorbed unobtrusively into the harmonic flow of the original material." There is a fourth variation of Theme I, Variation IV, at bar 152. It has a "cantabile-decorative treatment of exquisitely moulded ornamental melody". At this point the whole movement at last begins to spring into bloom, as its "nocturne-like" embellishments in the high register become even more adventurous. The unexpected return to D♭ major and Theme II provides a climax of great majesty. Samson writes that: "It is indeed a glorious moment. The deceptive innocence of Theme II is transformed into a powerful apotheosis, building with ever more impassioned fervour towards ... the return to F minor. The structural dominant appears now for the first time in the work and it remains suspended, poised on a precipice of harmonic tension, while a series of pianissimo chords prolongs it in a brief illusion of repose. The bravura closing section which follows seems to exorcise earlier conflicts and tensions in a white heat of virtuosity. These final moments are among the most majestic perorations in all Chopin."

== Bibliography ==
- Jonson, George Charles Ashton (1905). A Handbook to Chopin's Works. Doubleday.
- Rothstein, William (1994). "Ambiguity in the Themes of Chopin's First, Second, and Fourth Ballades". Intégral. 8: 1–50. ISSN 1073-6913. JSTOR 40213955.
- Samson, Jim (1992). Chopin: the Four Ballades. Cambridge University Press. doi:10.1017/CBO9780511611650. ISBN 9780511611650.
- Samson, Jim (1994). "Extended forms: the ballades, scherzos and fantasies". In Samson, Jim (ed.). The Cambridge Companion to Chopin. Cambridge University Press. pp. 101–123. doi:10.1017/CCOL9780521404907. ISBN 9780521477529.
- Walker, Alan, ed. (1973). The Chopin companion: Profiles of the man and the musician. The Norton library. New York: Norton. ISBN 978-0-393-00668-1.
- Walker, Alan (2018). Fryderyk Chopin: A Life and Times (1 ed.). New York: Farrar, Straus and Giroux. ISBN 978-0-374-15906-1.
