= Alexander Gavrylyuk =

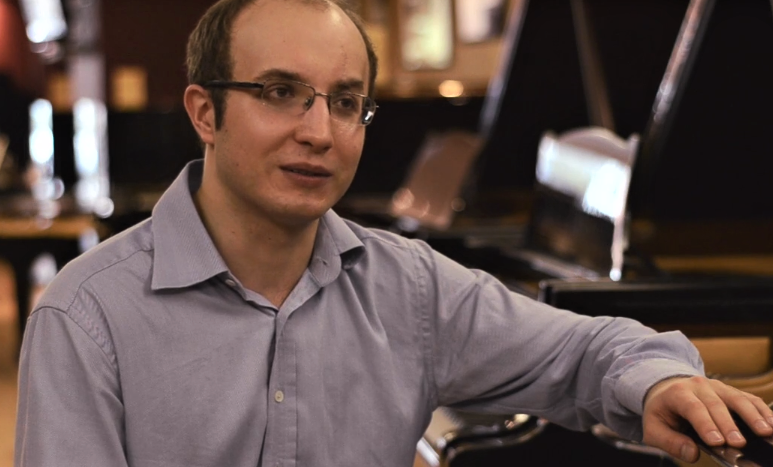

Background information
- Born: 19 August 1984 (age 42); Kharkiv, Ukraine
- Genre: Classical
- Occupation: Concert Pianist
- Instrument: Piano
- Years active: 1993 till present
- Website: www.alexandergavrylyuk.com

Alexander Gavrylyuk (born 19 August 1984) is a Ukrainian-born Australian pianist.

== Career ==
Gavrylyuk's first concert performance was at the age of nine. He moved to Australia at the age of 13.

In 1999 he won the Vladimir Horowitz Competition, in 2000 the Hamamatsu Competition and in 2005 the Arthur Rubinstein International Piano Master Competition.

Gavrylyuk has held solo recitals at, among others, Wigmore Hall in London, Musikverein in Vienna, Tonhalle, Zürich and Konzerthaus Berlin. The major orchestras he has performed with include: the Sydney Symphony Orchestra, the Royal Concertgebouw Orchestra, New York Philharmonic, Israel Philharmonic Orchestra, Moscow Philharmonic Orchestra, Bournemouth Symphony Orchestra, Warsaw National Philharmonic Orchestra and the Royal Scottish National Orchestra.

He has recorded Sergei Prokofiev's five concertos with the Sydney Symphony Orchestra under Vladimir Ashkenazy. In 2013 and 2014, he gave cycle performances of all four Rachmaninov concertos as well as the Rhapsody on a Theme of Paganini, with Neeme Järvi (Orchestre de la Suisse Romande) and Bramwell Tovey (Vancouver Symphony Orchestra), respectively.

Other conductors with whom Gavrylyuk has collaborated include: Herbert Blomstedt, Vladimir Jurowski, Vasily Petrenko, Osmo Vänskä, Louis Langrée, Andrey Boreyko, Vladimir Spivakov, Oleg Caetani and Yuri Simonov.

As part of the 2017 London Prom season at the Royal Albert Hall he performed Rachmaninov's Third Concerto with the BBC Scottish Symphony Orchestra under Thomas Dausgaard to great acclaim.

== Awards ==
- 1999 - First prize and Gold Medal at the 1999 Horowitz International Piano Competition
- 2000 - First Prize at the Hamamatsu International Piano Competition in Japan
- 2003 - Named Steinway Artist
- 2005 - Gold Medal at the Arthur Rubinstein International Piano Masters Competition in Tel Aviv.

== Recordings ==
- Brahms: Paganini Variations; Liszt: Mephisto Waltz; Tarantella; Danse Macabre; Isolde's Liebestod / Alexander Gavrylyuk. Label: Piano Classics, 2015.
- Mussorgsky: Pictures At An Exhibition; Schumann: Kinderszenen / Alexander Gavrylyuk. Label: Piano Classics, 2014.
- Rachmaninov: Moments Musicaux; Scriabin: Sonata No 5; Prokofiev: Sonata No 7 / Alexander Gavrylyuk. Label: Piano Classics, 2011.
- Prokofiev: Piano Concertos Nos. 3 & 5 / Alexander Gavrylyuk, Vladimir Ashkenazy. Label: Triton (Octavia), 2011.
- Sergei Prokofiev: Piano Concertos Nos. 1, 2 & 4 "left Hand" / Alexander Gavrylyuk, Vladimir Ashkenazy. Label: Triton (Octavia), 2011.
- Alexander Gavrylyuk In Recital - Arcadi Volodos, Sergei Rachmaninov, Mily Balakirev, Moritz Moszkowski. Label: Video Artists International, 2010. (2 disks)
- Miami International Piano Festival / Alexander Gavrylyuk - Franz Joseph Haydn, Johannes Brahms, Alexander Scriabin, Sergei Prokofiev. Label: Vai Audio, 2006. (2 disks).
