= Polonaise in F-sharp minor, Op. 44 (Chopin) =

1841 musical work for solo piano

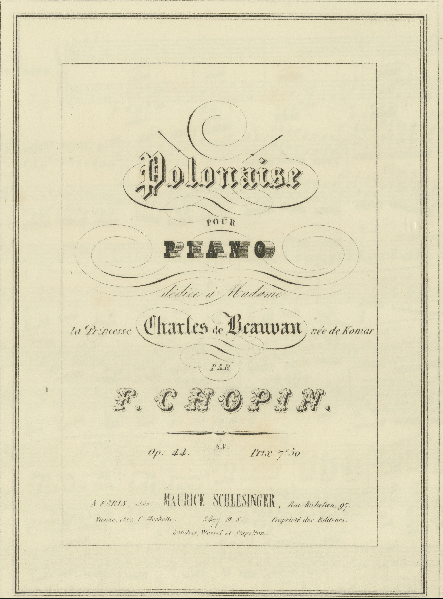
The cover of the first edition.

Polonaise in F♯ minor, Op. 44
Performed by Olga Gurevich

The Polonaise in F♯ minor, Op. 44, is a piece for solo piano written by Frédéric Chopin in 1841. It is often referred to as the "tragic" polonaise, due to its dark nature. The polonaise is dedicated to Princess Ludmilla de Beauvau, a prominent member of the Polish émigré community in Paris.

Despite its title, the polonaise is a composite work in ternary form. The piece opens with a short menacing passage, and soon develops into a dark and often furious polonaise theme. The central section of the piece is a mazurka in A major that provides a romantic contrast. The mazurka soon gives in to darker harmonies and the polonaise returns after two isolated torrents of notes. At length, the reprise seems to lose force and momentum, and Chopin concludes the work with a surprising fortissimo double octave on F#. One of the largest polonaises, a typical performance of the work lasts around eleven minutes.

The piece is often considered the first of three "grand polonaises", (the other two being the Polonaise Op. 53 'Heroic', and the Polonaise-Fantaisie Op. 61) in which Chopin largely abandoned the old formula derived directly from dance practice. The time had come for polonaises subjected to free fantasy, for more heroic dance poems. In fact, Chopin was known to have said to the publisher, ‘I have a manuscript for your disposal. It is a kind of fantasy in polonaise form. But I call it a Polonaise’.
