= Eva Gevorgyan =

Russian-Armenian pianist

- Ева Геворгян; Եվա Գևորգյան
- Born: April 15, 2004 (age 21); Moscow, Russian Federation
- Citizenship: Armenia; Russia
- Occupations: Pianist; composer

Eva Gevorgyan (Russian: Ева Геворгян, Armenian: Եվա Գևորգյան; born 15 April 2004) is a Russian-Armenian pianist and composer.

== Biography ==
Eva Gevorgyan was born in Moscow. She is a piano student at the Tchaikovsky Moscow State Conservatory in the class of Natalia Trull and also at Reina Sofia School of Music in class of Stanislav Ioudenitch. She is a scholarship holder of the International Academy of Music in Liechtenstein. She perfected her skills at the International Piano Academy “Lago di Como” in Italy under the supervision of Stanislav Ioudenitch, William Grant Naboré and Dmitri Bashkirov. She participated in master classes conducted, among others, by Paul Badura-Skoda, Pavel Gililov, Grigory Gruzman, Piotr Paleczny, and Boris Petrushansky.

She has performed at numerous festivals, including Verbier Festival, the International Chopin Festival in Duszniki-Zdrój or Music Fest Perugia. She has collaborated with many ensembles, such as the Mariinsky Theater Orchestra, The Dallas Symphony Orchestra, The Russian National Orchestra, and conductors, including Valery Gergiev, Vladimir Spivakov, Vasily Petrenko and Lawrence Foster.

In 2021, she was a finalist at the XVIII International Chopin Piano Competition. She received the prize for the youngest female finalist in the Competition which is an extra-statutory prize.

== Selected awards and achievements ==
- Giuliano Pecara International Piano Competition in Gorizia (2016) – Grand Prix
- Robert Schumann International Piano Competition in Düsseldorf (2017) – 1st prize
- International Grand Piano Competition in Moscow (2018) – five special awards
- International Piano Competition for Young Artists in Cleveland (2018) – 1st prize and special prize for the best performance of a Bach piece
- Cliburn International Junior Piano Competition (2019) - 2nd prize and press award
- Chicago International Music Competition (2020) – Grand Prix and a special award for the best performance of a Chopin piece
- Award in the "Discovery of the Year" category, as part of the International Classical Music Award program (2019)
- Scholarship of the Ruhr Piano Festival (Klavier-Festival Ruhr), chosen by Evgeny Kissin (2020)
- The title of “Young Yamaha Artist” (2021)
