= Alexander Gadjiev =

Italian-Slovenian classical pianist

Alexander Gadjiev Aleksander Gadžijev
- Born: 23 December 1994 (age 31); Gorizia
- Genres: Classical music
- Occupation: Musician
- Instrument: Piano
- Years active: 2015-present
- Website: www.alexandergadjiev.com

Alexander Gadjiev (Slovene: Aleksander Gadžijev) (born 23 December 1994) is an Italian classical pianist.

== Biography ==
Gadjiev studied at the Mozarteum University Salzburg under Pavel Gililov and the Hochschule für Musik Hanns Eisler Berlin under Eldar Nebolsin. He won first prize at the Hamamatsu International Piano Competition in 2015.

In 2019, Gadjiev joined the BBC New Generation Artists scheme, for the scheduled period of 2019-2021. In the wake of the COVID-19 pandemic, the period of the 2019-2021 roster of New Generation Artists was extended to 2022, including Gadjiev. Gadjiev won second prize, ex aequo, as well as the Special Prize for the Best Performance of a Sonata at the XVIII International Chopin Piano Competition in 2021. Also in 2021, he won first prize and six other prizes in the 2021 Sydney International Piano Competition.
