= Nocturne in G minor =

The Nocturne in G minor may refer to:

- Nocturne in G minor, Op. 15, No. 3 by Frédéric Chopin (the best known)
- Nocturne in G minor, Op. 37, No. 1 by Frédéric Chopin
