= Ballades (Chopin) =

Piano pieces by Chopin

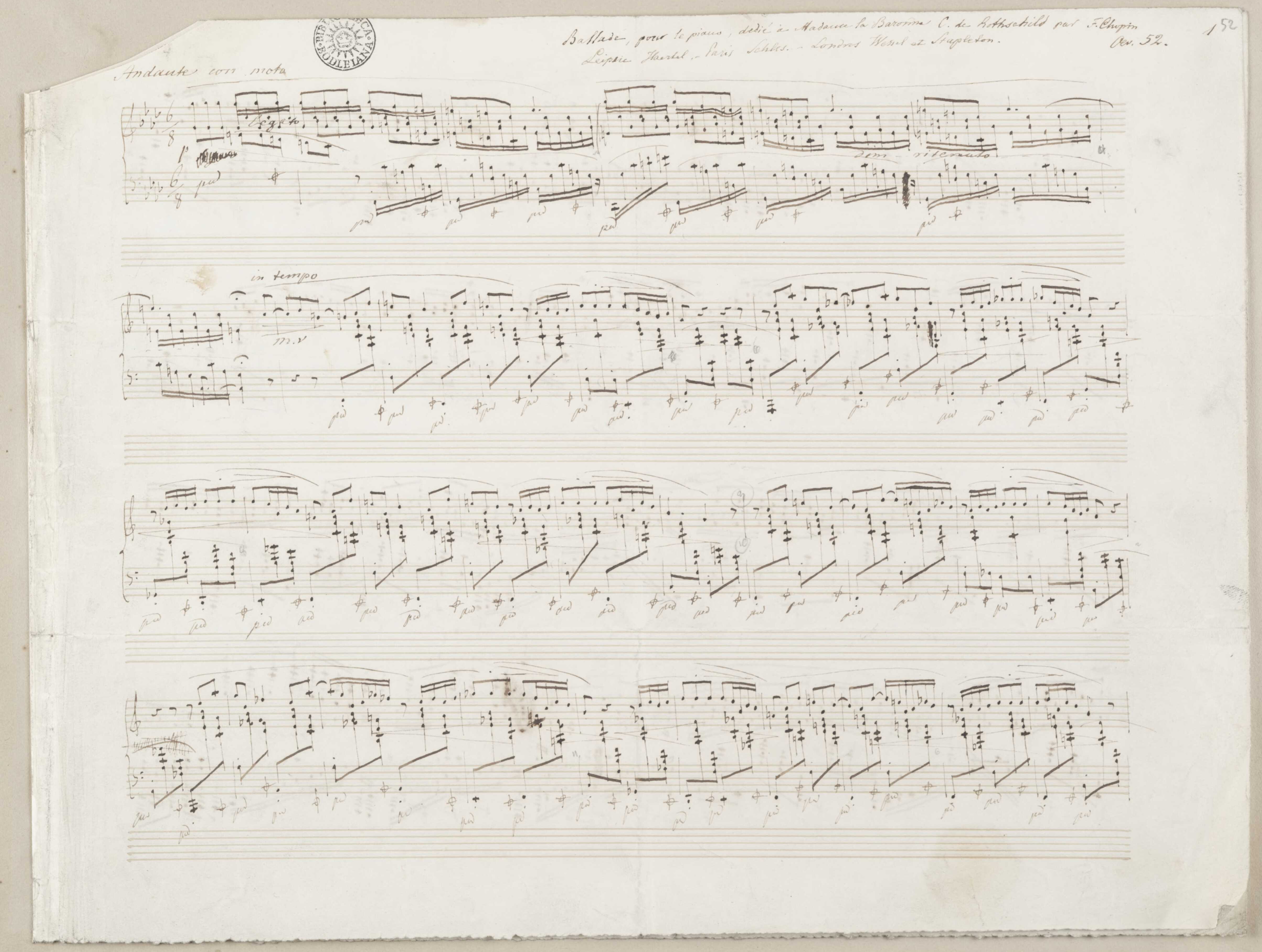
First page of Frédéric Chopin's Ballade No. 4, Op. 52. Autograph manuscript, 1842, Bodleian Library.

Frédéric Chopin's four Ballades are single-movement pieces for solo piano, composed between 1831 and 1842. They are considered to be some of the most important and challenging pieces in standard classical piano repertoire.

== Form ==
Chopin used the term ballade in the sense of a balletic interlude or dance piece, equivalent to the old Italian ballata. However, the term may also have connotations of the medieval heroic ballad, a narrative minstrel song, often of a fantastical character. There are dramatic and dance-like elements in Chopin's use of the genre, and he is a pioneer of the ballade as an abstract musical form. The ballade concept is said to have been inspired by a friend of Chopin's, poet Adam Mickiewicz. The true exact inspirations for each ballade, however, are not well documented.

Though the ballades do not conform precisely to sonata form, the "ballade form" created by Chopin for his four ballades is a variant of sonata form with specific discrepancies, such as the mirror reprise (presenting the two expositional themes in reverse order during the recapitulation). The ballades have directly influenced composers such as Franz Liszt and Johannes Brahms, who wrote ballades of their own after Chopin's example.

Besides sharing the title, the four ballades are entities distinct from each other. According to composer and music critic Louis Ehlert, "Each [ballade] differs entirely from the others, and they have but one thing in common – their romantic working out and the nobility of their motifs." Modern theorists have shown, however, that the ballades do have much in common, such as the "ballade meter" (6/4 or 6/8) and certain formal practices like the mirror reprise and delaying the structural dominant.

== The Ballades ==
The four ballades are as follows:

- Ballade No. 1 in G minor, Op. 23, was completed in 1835 in Paris, France.
- Ballade No. 2 in F major, Op. 38, was composed from 1836 to 1839 in Nohant, France, and on the Spanish island of Mallorca.
- Ballade No. 3 in A♭ major, Op. 47, was composed in 1841 in Nohant.
- Ballade No. 4 in F minor, Op. 52, was composed in 1842 in Paris and Nohant and revised in 1843.

== Recordings ==
The four ballades have been recorded by many renowned pianists, including Arthur Rubinstein, Vladimir Ashkenazy, Dinu Lipatti, Sviatoslav Richter, Martha Argerich, Emanuel Ax, Andrei Gavrilov, Yundi Li, Seong-Jin Cho, Murray Perahia and Krystian Zimerman. The Guardian has described Krystian Zimerman's recording of the Chopin ballades with Deutsche Grammophon as a "key recording".
