= Ballade No. 3 (Chopin) =

Composition for piano by Frederic Chopin

- Ballade by Frédéric Chopin
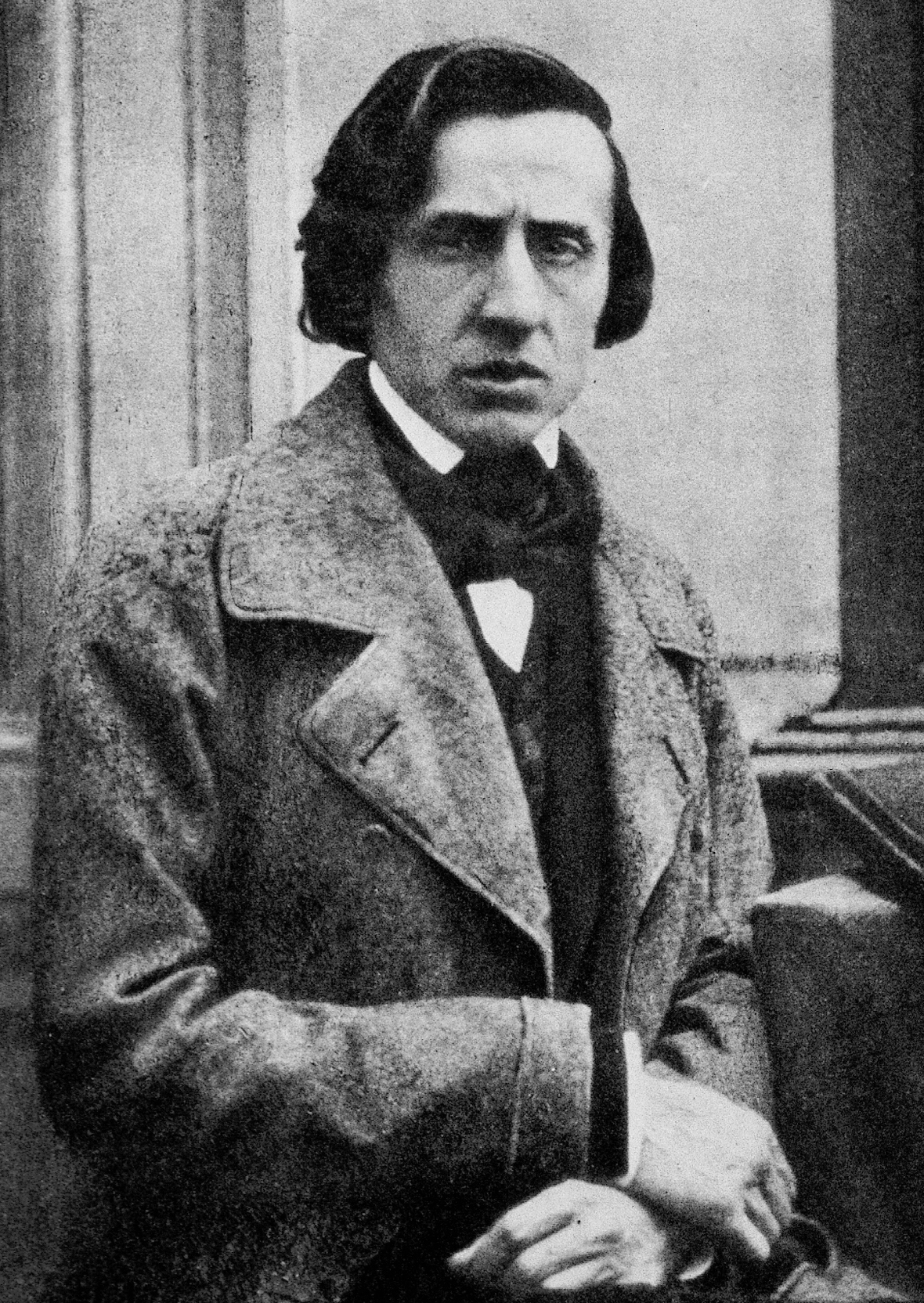
- Daguerreotype of Chopin, c. 1849
- Key: A♭ major
- Opus: 47
- Composed: 1841
- Dedication: Pauline de Noailles
- Published: 1841
- Duration: 7-8 minutes

The Ballade No. 3 in A♭ major, Op. 47, is the third of Frédéric Chopin's ballades for solo piano. It was composed and published in 1841. A typical performance spans seven to eight minutes.

It is the only ballade by Chopin to begin and end in a major key.

== History ==
The piece was first mentioned by Chopin in a letter to Julian Fontana on 18 October 1841. It was likely composed in the summer of 1841 in Nohant, France, where he had also finished the Nocturnes Op. 48 and the Fantaisie in F minor. The first German edition, published by Breitkopf & Härtel, appeared in January 1842.

The ballade is dedicated to his pupil Pauline de Noailles (1823–1844). The inspiration for it is usually claimed to be Adam Mickiewicz's poem Undine, also known as Świtezianka. There are structural similarities with the "Raindrop Prelude" that were inspired by the weather in Mallorca during Chopin's disastrous vacation with George Sand. These include a repetitive A♭ which modulates into a G♯ during the C♯ minor section.

== Structure ==
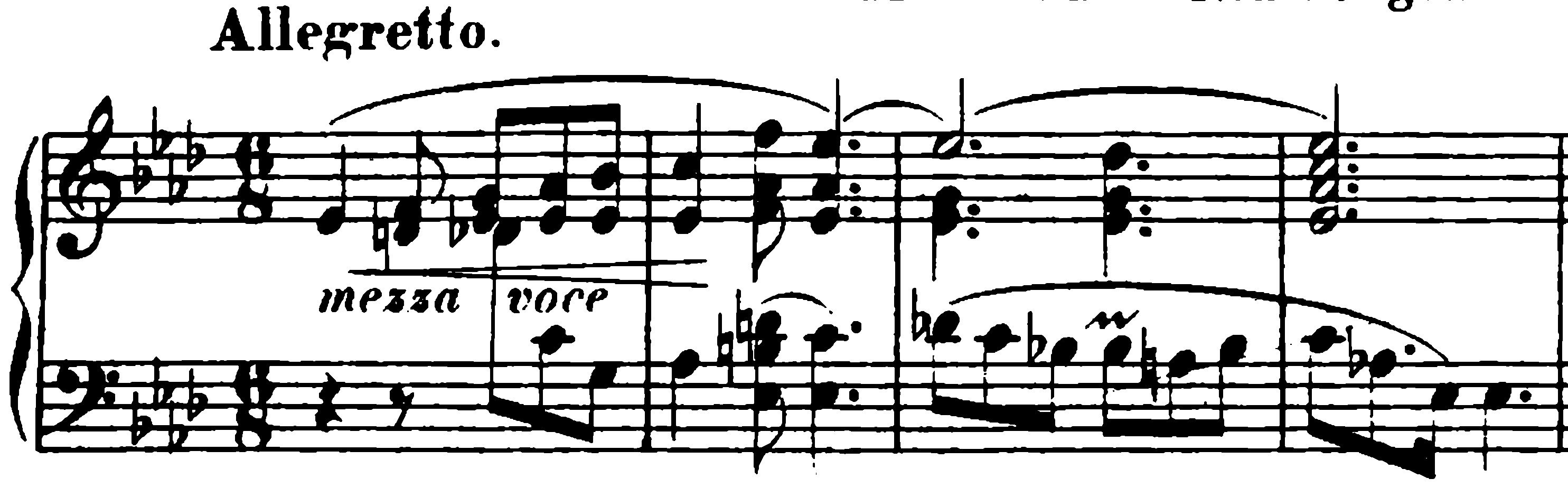
Opening bars of Ballade No. 3

Ballade No. 3
Performed by Martha Goldstein on an 1851 Erard piano

Ballade No. 3
Performed by Donald Betts

The form of the ballade is an arch: A–B–C–B–A–coda. The "A" theme is in two parts; the first part is song-like and the second is dance-like. Out of the four ballades by Chopin, this ballade has the tightest structure. It uses development procedures that heighten the tension.

The ballade opens with a lengthy introduction marked dolce. The introduction is thematically unrelated to the majority of the piece but is repeated at the close and climax of the work. Following the introduction, Chopin introduces a new theme in a section with the performance direction mezza voce; this theme consists of repeated Cs in two broken octaves in the right hand. This theme reoccurs three times in the ballade, twice on C and once on A♭.

The mezza voce section soon develops into a furious F minor chordal section and once again returns to A♭. The mezza voce section is repeated, followed by a new theme consisting of right-hand sixteenth-note leggiero runs. The following return of the broken octave theme is transposed from C to A♭ (the repeated Cs now being A♭s). The key signature then shifts to C♯ minor. The original "B" theme is then developed, this time using rapid, chromatic left-hand runs under large chords in the right. This theme builds to a climax through rapid repetition of broken G♯ octaves (referencing the mezza voce theme) with fragments of the "C" theme in the left hand.

A retransition occurs as the dynamic builds from piano to forte. The figuration in the left hand is chromatic and consists of spans frequently larger than an octave. The key signature then shifts back to A♭ major. In the final section of the arch, the "A" theme from the introduction is repeated again in octaves. The ballade ends with a reprise of the A♭ leggiero runs and a second right hand arpeggio. Four chords provide closure to the piece.
