= Barcarolle (Chopin) =

1845–1846 piece for solo piano by Frédéric Chopin

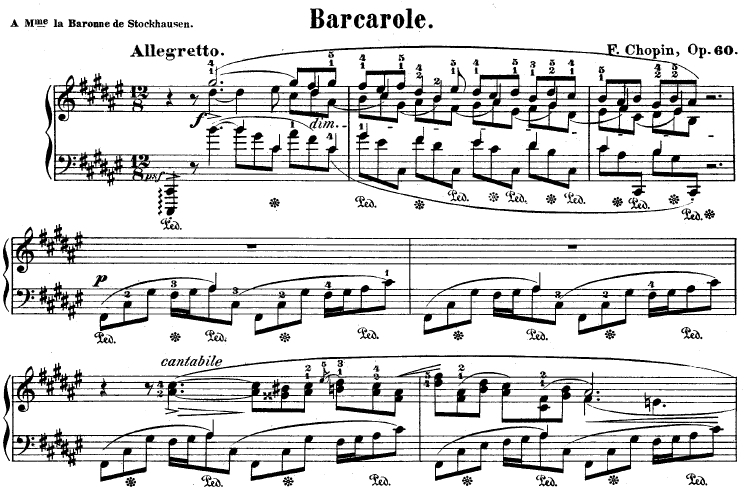
The opening of the Barcarolle

Barcarolle, Op. 60
Performed by Martha Argerich (8:06)

The Barcarolle in F-sharp major, Op. 60, is a piece for solo piano by Frédéric Chopin, composed between autumn of 1845 and summer 1846.

Based on the barcarolle rhythm and mood, it features a sweepingly romantic and slightly wistful tone. Many of the technical figures for the right hand are thirds and sixths, while the left features very long reaches over an octave. Its middle section is in A major, and this section's second theme is recapitulated near the piece's end in F-sharp. It is also one of the pieces where Chopin's affinity with the bel canto operatic style is most apparent, as the double notes in the right hand along with spare arpeggiated accompaniment in the left hand explicitly imitate the style of the great arias and scenas from the bel canto operatic repertoire. The writing for the right hand becomes increasingly florid as multiple lines spin filigree and ornamentation around each other.

This is one of Chopin's last major compositions, along with his Polonaise-Fantasie, Op. 61. It is often considered to be one of his more demanding compositions, both in execution and interpretation, and recordings exist from virtually all the greatest pianists. Performance times average seven to nine minutes.
