= Aimi Kobayashi =

Aimi Kobayashi 小林 愛実
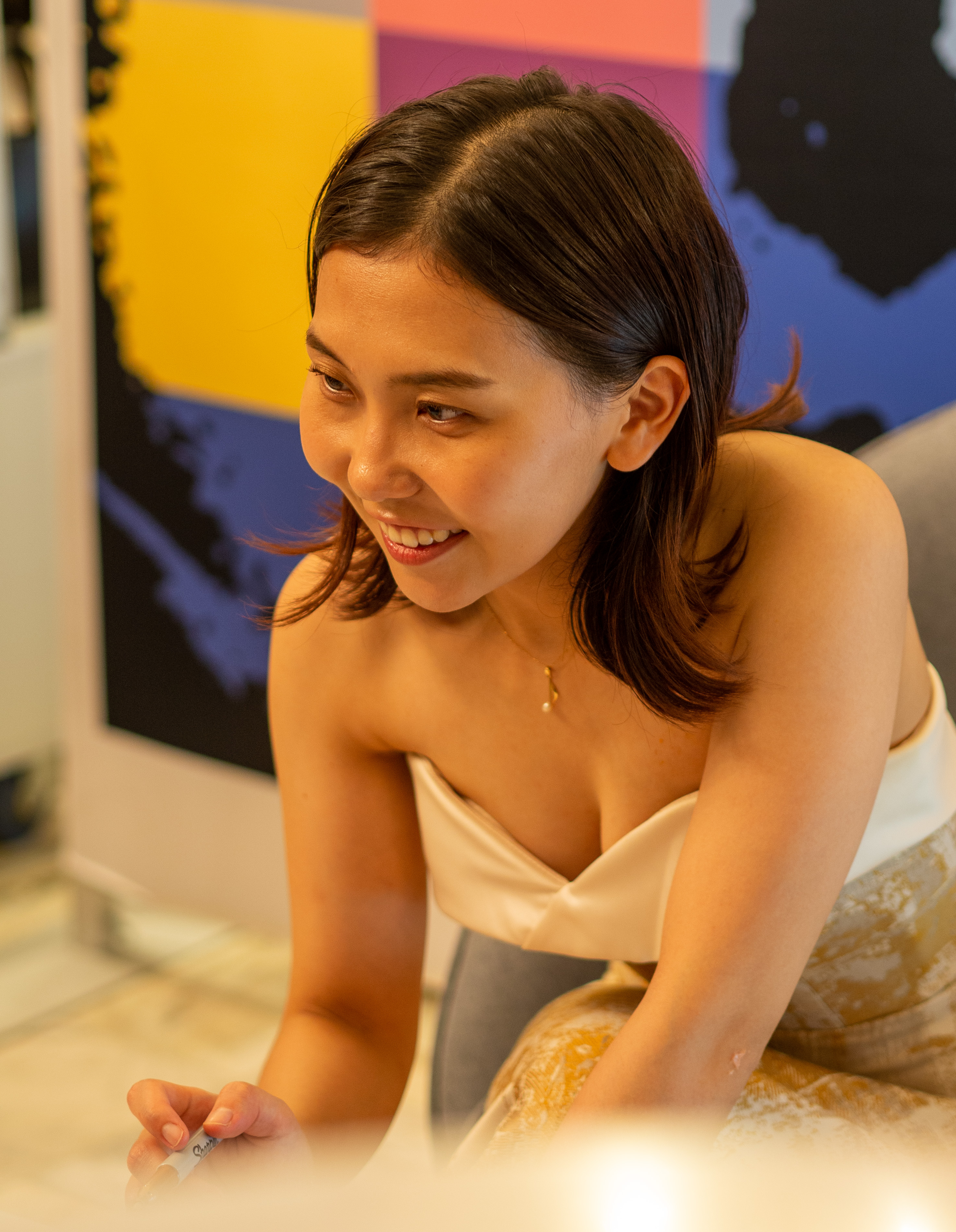
- Aimi Kobayashi in 2022, during Chopin and his Europe festival

Background information
- Born: September 23, 1995 (age 31); Ube, Yamaguchi, Japan
- Genre: Classical music
- Occupation: Musician
- Instrument: Piano
- Label: Warner Music Japan
- Spouse: Kyohei Sorita

Aimi Kobayashi (小林 愛実, Kobayashi Aimi; born September 23, 1995) is a Japanese classical pianist. She was a finalist at the XVII International Chopin Piano Competition and won 4th prize at the subsequent XVIII International Chopin Piano Competition.

== Biography ==
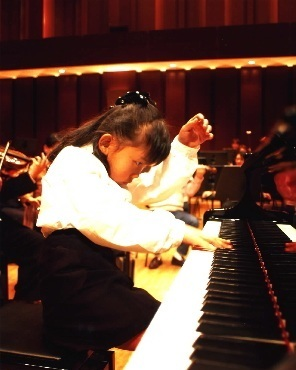
Aimi Kobayashi's 2004 debut playing the piano.

Aimi Kobayashi was born in Ube, Yamaguchi Prefecture and she lived there until February 2007 and later in Tokyo, started learning the piano at the age of three, played with an orchestra at age seven, and has been receiving tutelage from Yuko Ninomiya since the age of eight.

Kobayashi's awards include three Yamaguchi Prefecture "Glory Culture Prize" and the special Frédéric Chopin passport from the Polish government. She has performed in France, Brazil, Poland, Russia, South Korea, the United States, and Japan in venues such as the Salle Cortot (Paris), Svetlanov Hall (Moscow), Suntory Hall (Japan), and all three halls of the Carnegie Hall Complex (New York City). AADGT (the American Association for Development of the Gifted and Talented), a New York-based non-profit organization, has supported Kobayashi for many years.

In 2010, Kobayashi released her CD/DVD debut, Aimi Kobayashi Debut, followed by another CD, Passion, for EMI Classics Japan. In 2011, she made her acting debut in the Japanese film Sleep directed by Katsumi Sakaguchi. Kobayashi's management company is To-On Artist's Promotion Agency, and she graduated from the Curtis Institute of Music.

In 2002, she placed 1st Young Piano Competition Piano Teachers' National Association of Japan

In 2009, she won the junior section prize of the Asia-Pacific International Chopin Piano Competition in South Korea

In 2011, she was the gold medalist at the Asia International Chopin Competition for her performance in the concerto section and won the Yasuko Fukuda prize

In 2012, she placed 3rd at the Gina Bachauer Young Artist Competition.

She has released three further CDs, two of which exclusively feature music composed by Chopin, and one with music by both Chopin and Franz Liszt.

In 2015, she was a finalist at the XVII International Chopin Piano Competition.

In 2021, she placed 4th, ex aequo, at the XVIII International Chopin Piano Competition.

On January 1, 2023, she married Kyohei Sorita, a childhood friend and fellow laureate of the XVIII Chopin Piano Competition. They have a child together.
