= Leonora Armellini =

Italian pianist

Leonora Armellini (born 25 June 1992) is an Italian pianist.

== Biography ==
Armellini was born in Padua. She began piano lessons at the age of four under the supervision of Laura Palmieri, a student and heiress of the Arturo Benedetti Michelangelo school. She graduated from the conservatory summa cum laude at the age of 12, after which she continued her studies at the Accademia Nazionale di Santa Cecilia in Rome in the class of Sergio Perticaroli, from which she graduated (also with honors) at the age of 17. From 2011 she studied with Lilya Zilberstein at the Hochschule für Musik und Theater in Hamburg, she was also a student of Boris Petrushansky at the International Piano Academy "Incontri col Maestro" in Imola. Additionally, she studied composition at the Cesare Pollini Conservatory in Padua under Giovanni Bonato. Armellini also benefited from the Theo Lieven Scholar scholarship, which allowed her to study piano with William Grant Naboré at the Lugano Conservatory.

== Awards and achievements ==
She is a laureate of many Italian piano competitions in which she participated from the age of six. In 2005, she won the first prize at the Venezia Prize (Premio Venezia), a competition for the best graduates of music academies in Italy. In 2009, she won the first prize in the Camillo Togni International Piano Competition in Brescia.

At the XVI International Chopin Piano Competition in Warsaw in 2010 she entered the third stage. She also received the Janina Nawrocka Award for "extraordinary musicality and beauty of sound". In May 2013, she was recognized by the Associazione Nazionale Critici Musicali council, by whose decision the prestigious Premio Piero Farulli award was awarded to a music trio whose members, apart from Leonora Armellini, are the violinist Laura Marzadori and the cellist Ludovico Armellini – the artist's brother.

On September 23, 2013, at the Teatro La Pergola in Florence, Leonora Armellini received the prestigious international Galileo 2000 award from Zubin Mehta for "courage and musical talent".

She was a finalist of the 16th Ferruccio Busoni International Piano Competition in 2017. In 2021 she won the fifth prize in the XVIII International Chopin Piano Competition in Warsaw.

== Concerts and performances ==
Leonora Armellini's repertoire includes works by, among others, Haydn, Mozart, Beethoven, Mendelssohn, Chopin, Schumann, Clara Schumann, Liszt, Gershwin, Prokofiev and Tchaikovsky. Her artistic achievements include several hundred performances in Italy, Poland, Great Britain, Austria, the Czech Republic, France, Switzerland, Germany, Russia, Tunisia, the United States, India, China, South Korea and Japan. At the age of 17, she performed at the Carnegie Weill Recital Hall in New York. She has performed at a number of festivals, including: Lugano as part of Martha Argerich's Project, at the International Chopin Festival in Duszniki Zdrój, Poland and at the Chopin and His Europe International Music Festival in Warsaw, Poland (2011). She also performed at the International A.B. Michelangeli Festival in Bergamo and Brescia, and Festival Dino Ciani in Cortina d'Ampezzo. In 2006, she gave a recital at the Gran Teatro La Fenice in Venice on the occasion of the official celebration of the 60th anniversary of the Italian Republic. In 2013, instead of the indisposed Daniel Barenboim, she played a concert at the San Remo Festival, broadcast to an audience of approximately 155 million.

She has performed with orchestras such as Warsaw Philharmonic, Kronstadt Philharmonic, Turin Philharmonic Orchestra, I Solisti Veneti, Orchestra del Teatro La Fenice in Venice, Teatro Alla Scala Chamber Orchestra in Milan, Orchestra del Teatro Giuseppe Verdi in Trieste, I Virtuosi Italiani, Orchestra dell'Arena di Verona, Orchestra Alpe-Adria or Sinfonia Varsovia.

Armellini has collaborated with conductors such as Alexandre Rabinovitch-Barakovsky, Claudio Scimone, Zoltán Peskó, Anton Nanut, Andrea Battistoni, Damian Iorio, Giordano Bellincampi, Christopher Franklin, Massimiliano Caldi, Emilian Madey, Jacek Kaspszyk, Maurizio Dini Ciacci.

She also performs as a chamber musician. She has played with Lilya Zilberstein and Jeffrey Swann, Mario Brunelli, Giovanni Angeleri, Trie Broz, Laura Marzadori, Lucia Hall and Sonig Tchakerian, among others.

== Discography ==
=== DVD ===
- Leonora Armellini. Piano Recital (DVD Video, Continuo Records CR128, 2019)

=== CD (selected) ===
- Chopin (SACD, Velut Luna CVLD156, 2007)
- Chopin: Nokturn cis-moll; Ballada As-dur; Etiuda Es-dur; Koncert c-moll, op. 11 (CD, Fryderyk Chopin Institute NIFCCD615, 2012)
- Schumann: Album für die Jugend, op. 68 (CD, Acousence Classics ACO-11813, 2014)
- The Early Years (CD, Velut Luna AUD154, 2016)
- Johannes Brahms: Complete Music for Two Pianos (Leonora Armellini, Mattia Ometto – pianos) (CD, Da Vinci Classics C00138, 2018)
- Johannes Brahms: Cello Sonatas (Luca Giovannini – cello, Leonora Armellini – piano) (CD, Velut Luna CVLD327, 2020)
- Poulenc, Britten, Debussy: Music for 2 Pianos and Piano for 4-hands (Leonora Armellini, Mattia Ometto – pianos) (CD, Brilliant Classics 96163, 2020)

== Publications ==
She is the co-author (together with the Italian psychiatrist Matteo Rampin) of the book Mozart era un figo, Bach ancora di più (2014), reprinted several times and translated in Spanish.
