= Martín García García =

Spanish classical pianist

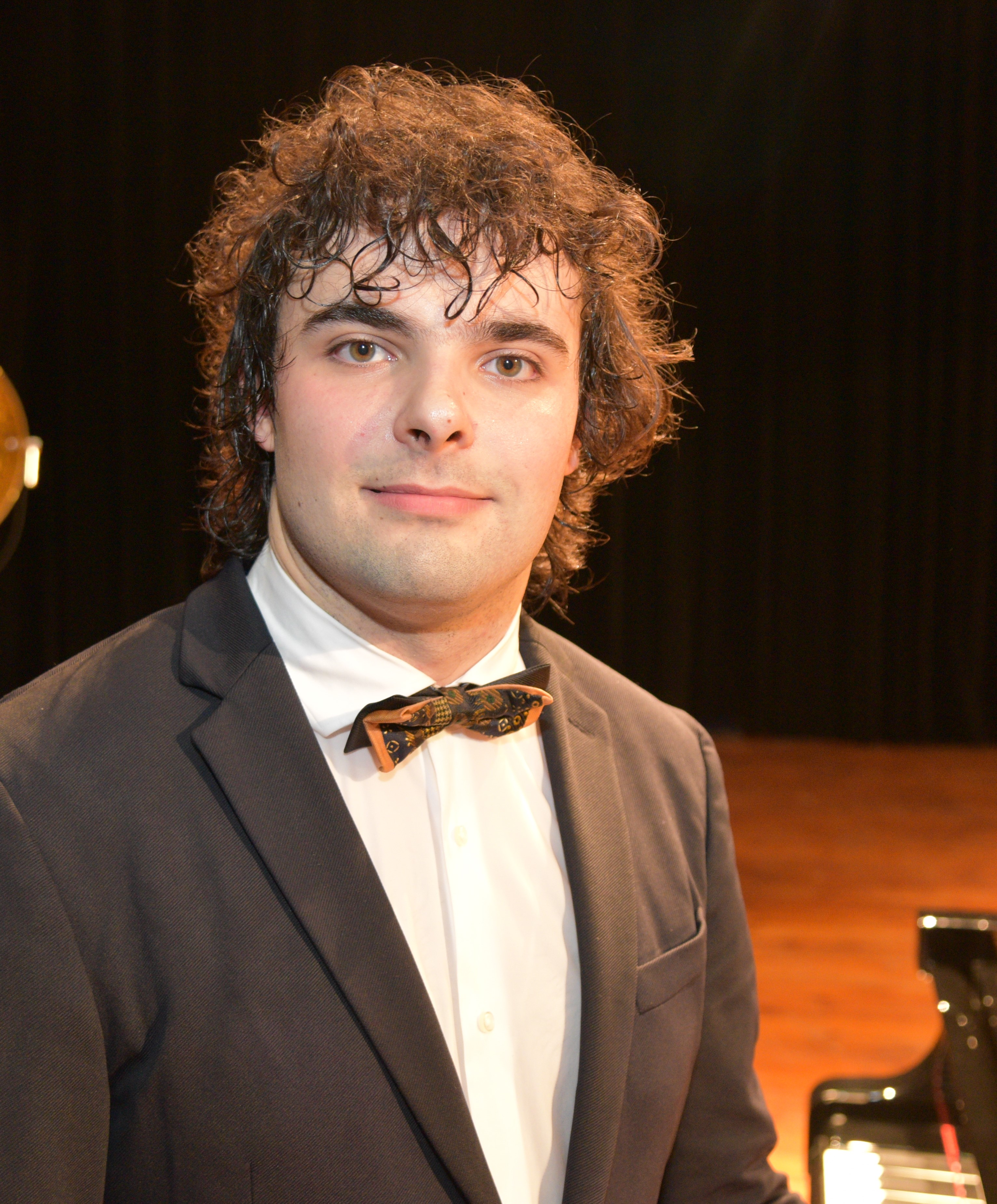

Background information
- Born: 3 December 1996 (age 29)
- Genres: Classical music
- Occupation: Musician
- Instrument: Piano

Martín García García (born 3 December 1996) is a Spanish classical pianist. In 2021, he won third prize at the XVIII International Chopin Piano Competition and first prize at the Cleveland International Piano Competition.

== Biography ==
Martín García García studied with Galina Eguiazarova at the Reina Sofía School of Music in Madrid and with Jerome Rose at the Mannes School of Music in New York.
