= Alessio Bax =

Italian pianist (born 1977)

- Born: 30 November 1977 (age 48); Bari, Italy
- Genre: classical music
- Occupation: pianist
- Instrument: piano
- Years active: 1997–present
- Website: Alessio Bax

Alessio Bax (born 30 November 1977 in Bari, Italy) is an Italian classical pianist. He graduated from the Bari conservatory at the record age of 14. He won the Hamamatsu International Piano Competition in Japan at age 19 and the Leeds International Pianoforte Competition in 2000 after first participating in 1993. Bax was a member of the Chamber Music Society of Lincoln Center's CMS Two for three seasons, beginning in 2009. He also received the Avery Fisher Career Grant in 2009. He studied at Southern Methodist University in Dallas, Texas with Basque pianist Joaquín Achúcarro. Bax is a Steinway Artist. He also serves since 2019 on the faculty of the New England Conservatory of Music as a professor of piano.

== Career highlights ==
Bax has appeared as the soloist with the New York Philharmonic, Boston Symphony Orchestra, Cleveland Orchestra, Royal Philharmonic Orchestra, London Philharmonic Orchestra, City of Birmingham Symphony Orchestra, Royal Liverpool Philharmonic, Royal Scottish National Orchestra, Baltimore Symphony, Saint Louis Symphony, Dallas Symphony, Houston Symphony, Seattle Symphony, Helsinki Philharmonic, Orchestre National de Lille, Hungarian Symphony Orchestra, Tokyo Symphony, New Japan Philharmonic Orchestra, Minnesota Orchestra and St. Petersburg Philharmonic. Bax has collaborated with conductors such as Marin Alsop, Vladimir Ashkenazy, Sir Andrew Davis, Hannu Lintu, Ruth Reinhardt, Daniele Rustioni, Yuri Temirkanov, Jaap van Zweden and Sir Simon Rattle. As a chamber music performer, Bax has performed with musicians such as Emmanuel Pahud, Lisa Batiashvili, Joshua Bell, Vilde Frang, Daishin Kashimoto, Lawrence Power, Jean-Guihen Queyras, Paul Watkins, Ian Bostridge, Mark Padmore, and the Emerson String Quartet.

Bax has given recitals at major venues in Rome, Milan, Madrid, Paris, London, Tel Aviv, Tokyo, Seoul, Hong Kong, New York, Washington, Mexico City. Bax made his New York recital debut at the Metropolitan Museum of Art in 2010. Alessio Bax played the Fugue of Beethoven's "Hammerklavier" Sonata for Daniel Barenboim in the documentary Barenboim on Beethoven in 2005, published on EMI.

A track from his release "Bach Transcribed" on Signum Classics was used to great acclaim in the 2017 film "Call Me by Your Name" by director Luca Guadagnino

In addition to his solo career, Bax also performs with his wife, pianist Lucille Chung. They have shared stages at venues around the world and recorded successful albums together. Chung described playing duo with Bax: "It just needs to be at the right time, then we love to say yes, since we are a great team. There is total trust and…we think so much alike, we don't even have to talk while rehearsing. We just know after a halt, where to come in again and how to communicate what we would like to happen. We think as a unit and that is advantageous for improving one's security level within the repertoire. We feel free to take risks during performance and still are aware of the safety net, the complete support at the same time".

Bax has been the artistic director of the Incontri in Terra di Siena Festival in Tuscany for ten years, the founder and current artistic director of the London Festival of Chamber Music at Smith Square Hall in London, and co-artistic director with Lucille Chung of the Joaquín Achúcarro Foundation in Dallas.

== Awards ==
In 2013 Bax received the Martin E. Segal Award from Lincoln Center, and the Andrew Wolf Chamber Music Award. In 2009, Bax received the Avery Fisher Career Grant, and was the first prize winner of the 2000 Leeds International Pianoforte Competition. Bax also won the 1997 Hamamatsu International Piano Competition.

== Personal life ==
Alessio Bax lives in New York City with his wife, Lucille Chung and their daughter Mila, to whom the album "Lullabies for Mila" was dedicated. In 2016, when Mila was not yet two, they were all featured together in a much loved episode of NPR's Tiny Desk Concerts. In addition to being a pianist, Bax also loves cooking, hosting "epic" multi-course dinner parties, as chronicled by a 2013 New York Times article.

== Discography ==
On Signum Classics:

- The complete Piano and Cello Sonatas by Ludwig van Beethoven with cellist Paul Watkins (Gramophone's "Album of the Month" and "Editor's Choice" 2026)
- Forgotten Dances (Bach, Bartok, Falla, Albéniz/Godowsky, Liszt, Ravel/Bax, Brahms/Cziffra)
- Debussy & Ravel for Two (Debussy and Ravel, with Lucille Chung)
- Italian Inspirations (Bach/Marcello, Rachmaninoff, Dallapiccola, Liszt)
- Beethoven's Emperor Concerto and rare solo works
- Poulenc (with Lucille Chung)
- Lullabies for Mila
- Scriabin/Mussorgsky
- Alessio Bax plays Beethoven: Hammerklavier and Moonlight Sonatas, and transcriptions from the Ruins of Athens by A. Bax
- Bax & Chung: Piano Four Hands (Brahms/Stravinsky/Piazzolla arr. Bax/Chung)
- Alessio Bax plays Mozart: Piano Concertos K. 491 & K. 595 and solo variations
- Alessio Bax plays Brahms
- Rachmaninov: Preludes & Melodies
- Bach Transcribed

On other labels:

- Baroque Reflections (Gramophone “Editor’s Choice” - Warner Classics, 2004)
- Ligeti’s complete four-hand and two-piano works (Dynamic Records, 2003)
- Carnival of the Animals with the Fort Worth Symphony (2005)
- Marcel Dupré Complete works for Organ and Piano duo (Naxos, 1996)
