= Kyohei Sorita =

Japanese classical pianist

Kyōhei Sorita 反田恭平
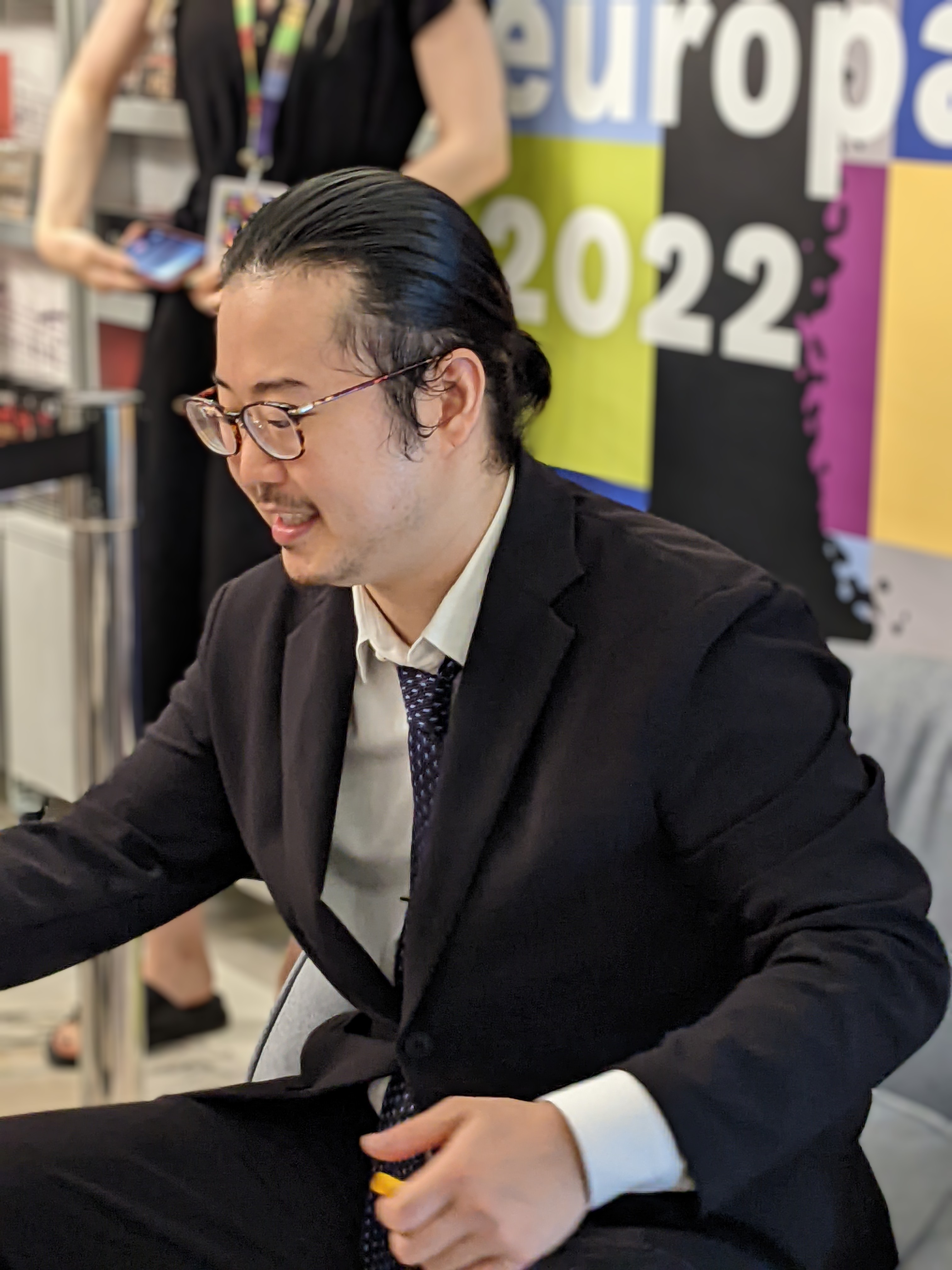
- Kyōhei Sorita during Chopin and his Europe Festival, 2022

Background information
- Born: September 1, 1994 (age 31); Tokyo, Japan
- Genres: Classical music
- Occupation: Musician
- Instrument: Piano
- Spouse: Aimi Kobayashi
- Website: www.kyoheisorita.com

Kyōhei Sorita (反田恭平, Sorita Kyōhei; born 1 September 1994) is a Japanese classical pianist and conductor. In 2021, he won second prize at the XVIII International Chopin Piano Competition, the highest prize for a Japanese-born pianist in the competition since Mitsuko Uchida's second prize in 1970.

== Biography ==
Sorita currently studies under Piotr Paleczny at the Chopin University of Music in Warsaw. He previously studied with Mikhail Voskresensky at the Moscow Conservatory. He has appeared as soloist with such orchestras as the Deutsches Symphonie-Orchester Berlin, Mariinsky Theatre Orchestra, RAI National Symphony Orchestra, NHK Symphony Orchestra, Warsaw National Philharmonic Orchestra, and on a five-city Japanese tour with the Russian National Orchestra. He has recorded for such labels as Denon Records.

In 2019, he founded the MLM National Orchestra. Known today as the Japan National Orchestra, it is a 17-member chamber orchestra.

On January 1, 2023, he announced his marriage to Aimi Kobayashi, a fellow laureate of the Chopin Competition, as well as Kobayashi's pregnancy. The two have known each other since childhood.
