= Michelle Candotti =

Italian pianist

Michelle Candotti (born 18 May 1996) is an Italian pianist.

== Biography ==
Michelle Candotti was born in Pisa. She graduated from Evaristo Felice Dall'Abaco Conservatory in Verona at the age of 14. She obtained the Master in Performance degree with distinction and the Artist Diploma at the Royal College of Music in London. She lives and works mainly in Hamburg.

== Awards and achievements ==
Candotti has participated in numerous national and international piano competitions. She is known for achieving the following:

- Versilia Riviera International Competition (piano section) - first prize
- XV Best Graduates Review of Italy year 2010-2011 in Castrocaro - first prize
- Alessandro Pavia Competition in Piacenza (piano section) - first prize
- Madesimo International Piano Competition - second prize ex-equo (first unassigned) and audience prize
- XV A. Scriabin International Piano Prize - second and audience prize
- Hastings International Piano Competition - second prize, also receiving the Sir Philip Ledger Trophy
- XXIII Chopin International Piano Competition "Rome" - second prize with prize for the youngest finalist and medal of the Italian Senate
- Brescia Classica International Piano Competition - third prize
- Massarosa International Piano Competition - third prize
- Utrecht Franz Liszt International Piano Competition - "Henk de Junior Jury" prize
- Premio Crescendo and Premio Crescendo at the fORTissimo in Florence - first prize
- 10th Andrea Baldi International Competition in Bologna - first prize
- International Maj Lind Piano Competition - finalist
- 2015: XVII International Chopin Piano Competition, Warsaw - II stage
- 2021: XVIII International Chopin Piano Competition, Warsaw - III stage
- 2025: XIX International Chopin Piano Competition, Warsaw - Preliminary stage

She has also been awarded as Roma Tre Orchestra "Young Artist", music season 2021 - 2022

== Performances ==
Candotti has performed at various international venues, including the Royal Albert Hall in London, the Warsaw Chopin Hall, and the Teatro Olimpico in Vicenza. In 2023, she performed at the Quirinale's Paolina Chapel for the concert season opening.

Besides, Michelle Candotti has also offered concerts in many major theaters and halls such as the Teatro Olimpico in Vicenza, the Teatro Verdi in Pordenone, the Teatro Manzoni and the Sala Mozart in Bologna, the Polytechnic University of Turin, the Chapel of merchants, shopkeepers, and bankers (better known as Cappella dei Mercanti) in Turin, the Sala Casella for the Roman Philharmonic, the Puccini Auditorium in Torre del Lago, the Sala dei Giganti and at Palazzo Zacco-Armeni in Padua, at Palazzo Albrizzi and Palazzo Cavagnis in Venice, on the Orbetello lagoon for the Orbetello Piano Festival, in the Concert Hall in Prato, at the Teatro delle Comedie and at the Teatro Goldoni in Livorno, at the Teatro Comunale in Fiuggi, at the Stables Theater in Hastings (near London), at the Royal Albert Hall in the Elgar Room, in Tasis (Lugano), at the Chopin Hall in Warsaw, the Palazzo Blu in Pisa and performed in Saint-Germain en Laye, Paris. Of note, Michelle featured in the Chopin's birthplace, Żelazowa Wola, and she offered three concerts at the Chopin's Monument in the Łazienki Park (Warsaw, 2022, 2023, 2024).

In 2023, Michelle opened the Concert's Season in the Quirinale's Paolina Chapel, at the presence of President Sergio Mattarella.
