= Hamamatsu International Piano Competition =

International piano competition

The Hamamatsu International Piano Competition has been held every 3 years since 1991 in Hamamatsu, Shizuoka, Japan, and is open to pianists up to 30 years old.

== History ==
The Piano Competition was inaugurated in 1991 to commemorate the 80th anniversary of the founding of Hamamatsu City on July 1, 1911. The Competition has been a member of the World Federation of International Music Competitions since 1998.

== Top prize winners ==
The 1st prize winners are:

- 1991 – Sergei Babayan
- 1994 – Victor Liadov
- 1997 – Alessio Bax
- 2000 – Alexander Gavrylyuk
- 2003 – Rafal Blechacz, Poland and Alexander Kobrin, Russia (tied)
- 2006 – Alexej Gorlatch, Ukraine
- 2009 – Seong-Jin Cho, South Korea
- 2012 – Ilya Rashkovsky, Russia
- 2015 – Alexander Gadjiev, Italy/Slovenia
- 2018 – Can Çakmur, Turkey
- 2024 – Manami Suzuki, Japan
