= Sumino, Cherepovetsky District, Vologda Oblast =

Sumino Сумино
- Village
- Location within Vologda Oblast Location within Russia
- Coordinates: 59°19′N 37°36′E
- Country: Russia
- Region: Vologda Oblast
- District: Cherepovetsky District
- Time zone: UTC+3:00

Sumino (Russian: Сумино) is a rural locality (a village) in Abakanovskoye Rural Settlement, Cherepovetsky District, Vologda Oblast, Russia. The population was 4 as of 2002.

== Geography ==
Sumino is located 40 km northwest of Cherepovets (the district's administrative centre) by road. Pokrov is the nearest rural locality.
