= Mazurkas, Op. 24 (Chopin) =

1835 set of four mazurkas by Frédéric Chopin (1810-1849)

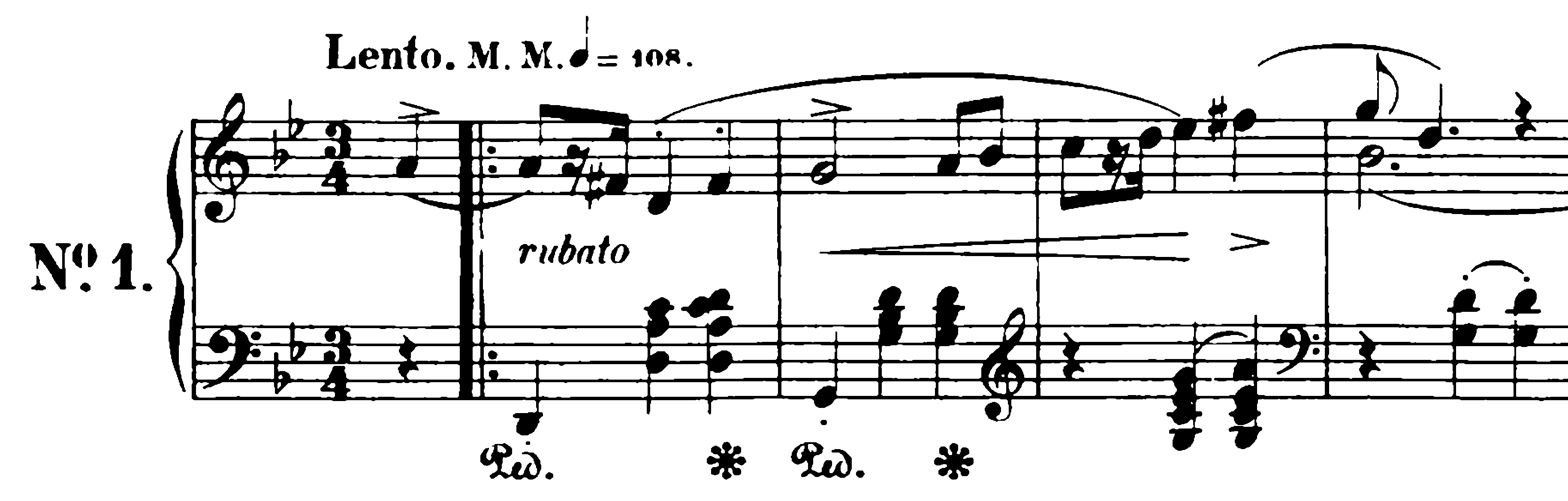
Mazurka, Op. 24 No. 1 Chopin

The Op. 24 mazurkas by Frédéric Chopin were published in 1835, when the composer was 25 years old.

== Pieces ==
=== No. 1 in G minor ===
The first mazurka of the Op. 24 set is in G minor with a tempo marking of Lento. The piece soon modulates to the relative major key (B♭ major) which soon shifts to a closely related key, E♭ major.

=== No. 2 in C major ===
Mazurka in C major, Op. 24 No. 2
Performed by Edward Neeman

The second mazurka of the set is in C major with a tempo marking of Allegro non troppo, opening with a quiet alternation of C and G major sotto voce chords. The trio is in D♭ major. The trio is closed by using repeated notes, generally open fifths. The piece is also notable for its vague yet distinctly diatonic harmony, as the opening 56 bars of the piece do not feature a single accidental.

=== No. 3 in A♭ major ===
Mazurka in A♭ major, Op. 24 No. 3
Performed by Edward Neeman

The third mazurka of the set is in A♭ major, with a tempo marking of Moderato non troppo.

=== No. 4 in B♭ minor ===
Mazurka in B♭ minor, Op. 24 No. 4
Performed by Luke Faulkner

The fourth mazurka of the set is in B♭ minor, ending on the dominant note (F) alone.
