= Étude Op. 10, No. 10 (Chopin) =

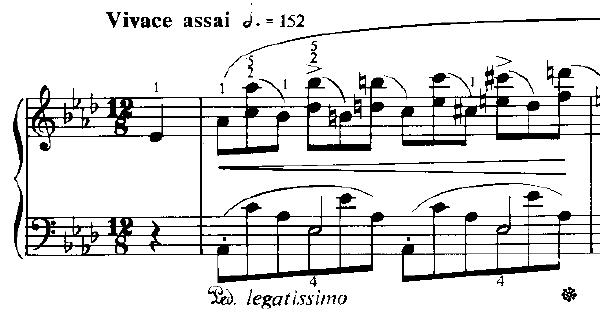
Excerpt from the beginning of Étude Op. 10, No. 10

Étude Op. 10, No. 10, in A♭ major, is a technical study composed by Frédéric Chopin. This étude places huge demands on the performer in varying a single pattern by changes of accent and touch. Chopin's primary concern in this work is for the widest possible variety of touch that can be given to a single figuration, with the continuous changes of accent highlighting not only different parts of the figuration but also emphasizing the polyphonic nature of the pattern.

The opening section (bars 1–16) sets forth the three basic variations with almost a constant legato bass line; off-beat with four accents per bar in the right hand against four in the left hand (bars 1–8); then on-beat but with six accents in the right hand against four in the left (bars 9–12); and finally both hands staccato with no accents.

The central section (bars 17–54) develops the opening theme through a series of modulations (E major, D♭ major, A major and E♭ major) with the accents in the right hand either being on- or off-beat. This is likely designed primarily to test the skills learnt in the first section. The climax of the central section starts at bar 43 and at this point it is the left hand that is playing off-beat whilst the right hand maintains a strict four beats per bar. The piece modulates back to the tonic of A♭ in bar 55.

The final section (bars 55–77) is a reprise of the opening theme, but with several modulations embedded within the final bars, all underpinned by a dominant pedal point. The tonic appears only very briefly in this final section and is not fully reestablished until bar 69, which is effectively the coda.
