= Hayato Sumino =

Japanese pianist

Hayato Sumino 角野隼斗
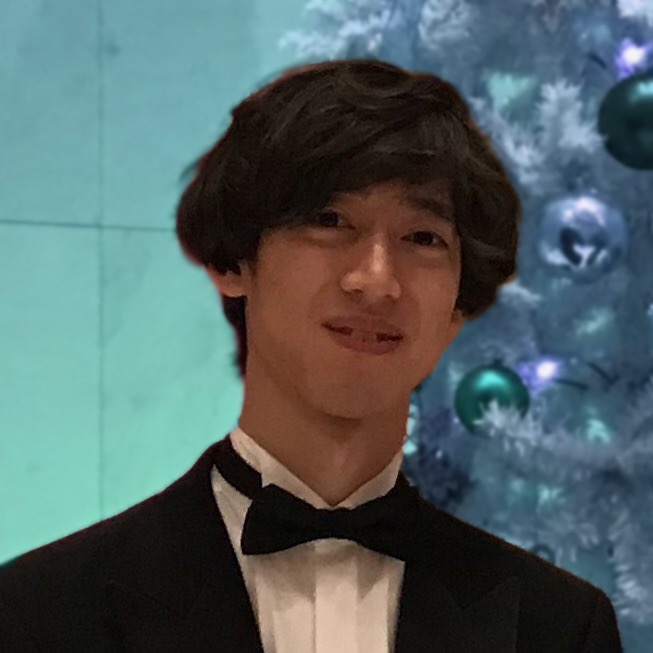
- Hayato Sumino, after a concert at Sumida Triphony Hall in Tokyo on 12 December 2019

Background information
- Born: 14 July 1995 (age 31); Tokyo, Japan
- Genres: Classical music; jazz; improvisation
- Occupations: pianist; composer; musical improviser
- Instruments: Piano; keyboards; Toy piano; melodica
- Labels: Warner Classics; eplus music; Sony Classical

YouTube information
- Channel: Cateen かてぃん
- Subscribers: 1.51 million (2025)
- Views: 242 million (2025)

Hayato Sumino (Japanese: 角野隼斗; born 14 July 1995) is a Japanese pianist and composer known for his performances of music by Frédéric Chopin. Born in Tokyo, he started playing the piano at age 3. He studied science and engineering at the University of Tokyo's Graduate School of Information Science and Technology, graduating in March 2020 with a master's degree and the President's Award. He also studied music information processing technology and artificial intelligence for six months at the French Institute for Research and Coordination in Acoustics/Music.

In August 2018 he won the Grand Prix at the 42nd PTNA Piano Competition, a Japanese piano competition. In July 2019 he won third prize at the Lyon International Piano Competition.

In 2021, Sumino participated in the XVIII International Chopin Piano Competition in Warsaw, in which he advanced to the third round (the semifinal). His live performance in the second round attracted 45,000 online viewers, setting a record for the competition. Before the competition, he had studied intensively online—due to the COVID-19 pandemic—with Jean-Marc Luisada.

Sumino also performed at the 28th Beijing Music Festival in October 2025.

Sumino is also a YouTuber by the name of "Cateen", with over 1.5 million subscribers as of 12 January 2025.

Sumino composed the soundtrack to "Firstline" (2024), a short film directed by China Sui and released by Toho Animation Studio as part of their "Gemnibus volume 1" anthology.

He is also a member of the Japanese "city soul" band Penthouse, where he has been serving as its pianist since 2019.

He is a Steinway Artist.

== Recordings ==
- Passion (2019, Warner Music)
- HAYATOSM (2020, eplus music)
- Human Universe (2024, Sony Classical)
- Chopin Orbit (2026, Sony Classical)

== Compositions ==
- Big Cat Waltz (2020)
- Tinkerland (2020)
- Piano Sonata No. 0 "SOUMEI" (2020)
- Cadenza to Liszt's Hungarian Rhapsody No. 2 (2020)
- 7 levels of "Twinkle, Twinkle Little Star" (2020)
- Happy Birthday To Everyone (Variations in all 12 major keys) (2020)
- One Minute Hourglass (2021)
- New Birth (2022)
- Baby's Breath (2023)
- Turkish March Variations in All 24 Keys (2024)
- Human Universe (2024)
- Nocturnes: I - Pre Rain (2024)
- Nocturnes: II - After Dawn (2024)
- Nocturnes: III - Once in a Blue Moon (2024)
- Forma (2026)
