= Scherzo No. 4 (Chopin) =

Solo piano composition

Chopin Scherzo no. 4 in E major, Op. 54, performed by Alice Gi-Young Hwang

The Scherzo No. 4, Op. 54, in E major by Frédéric Chopin was composed in 1842 in Nohant.

The scherzo was published in 1843. Unlike the preceding three scherzi (Op. 20, Op. 31, Op. 39), the E-major is generally calmer in temperament, though it still possesses some exceptionally passionate and dramatic moments. It seems to be a work that divides opinion: for pianist Jack Gibbons the 4th scherzo "is one of Chopin's most elegiac works, and without doubt contains some of the most profound and introspective music the composer ever wrote" while for John Palmer the work exhibits "more capriciousness and elegance than profundity." Petazzi said this scherzo differs from the others "as if it had passed through a magically purifying expressive filter." The scherzo is in sonata rondo form, with a trio in C♯ minor. It is the only one of Chopin's four scherzos primarily in a major key. As one critic explains, "When Chopin is at his happiest, most outwardly serene, then, for the pianist, he is at his most treacherous. The Fourth Scherzo is the only one in a major key and its mercurial brilliance and whimsy are notoriously hard to control."

Saint-Saëns particularly liked this scherzo.
