= Nocturnes, Op. 48 (Chopin) =

1842 pair of piano works by Frédéric Chopin

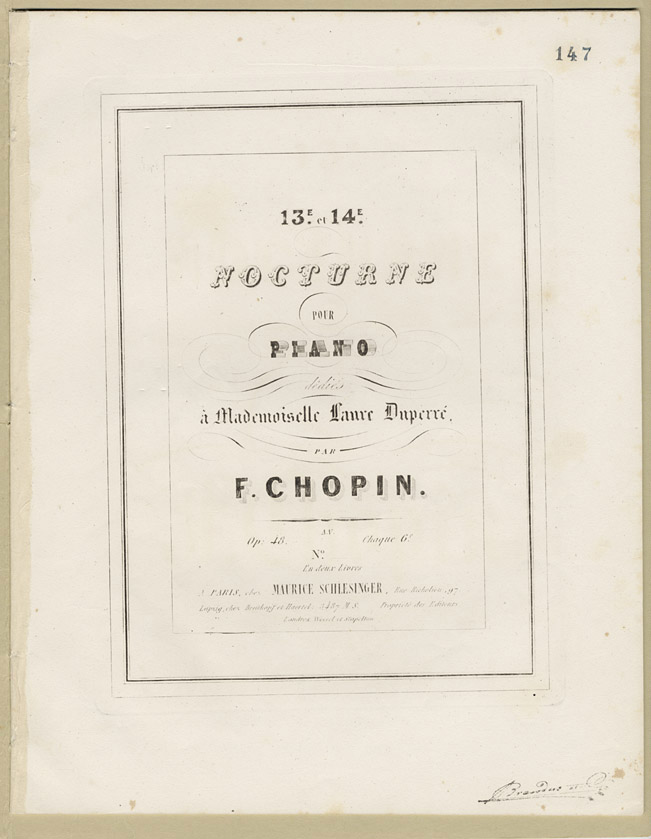
Title page to Nocturne Op. 48

The Nocturnes, Op. 48 are a set of two nocturnes for solo piano written by Frédéric Chopin in 1841 and published the following year in 1842. They are dedicated to Mlle. Laure Duperré. Chopin later sold the copyright for the nocturnes for 2,000 francs along with several other pieces.

== Pieces ==
=== No. 1 in C minor ===
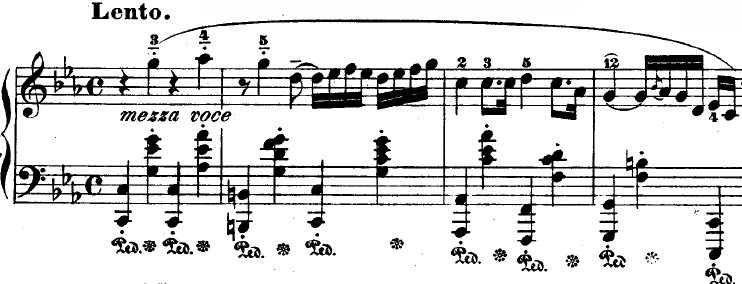
Opening bars from Op. 48 No. 1.

The Nocturne in C minor, Op. 48, No. 1 is initially marked lento and is in 4/4 meter. In general, the scheme of the music is ternary form and follows the structure A–B–A′.

The piece becomes poco più lento at measure 25 and enters its middle section, which is a chorale in C major. Later, it moves to a technically demanding doppio movimento agitato at measure 49 which features fortissimo octave passages and double octave arpeggios. Finally, the piece ends with a reprise of the initial melody with extremely fast chordal accompaniment. The piece is a total of 77 measures long.

The Nocturne in C minor is one of the more well known nocturnes, and has been categorized as one of Chopin's greatest emotional achievements. Theodor Kullak said of the piece, "the design and poetic contents of this nocturne make it the most important one that Chopin created; the chief subject is a masterly expression of a great powerful grief." Jan Kleczyński Sr. calls the nocturne "broad and most imposing with its powerful intermediate movement, a thorough departure from the nocturne style." Some musical critics, including Charles Willeby and Frederick Niecks, do not think the piece deserves its fame and position; though James Huneker agrees with this assessment, he notes that the nocturne is still "the noblest nocturne of them all." James Friskin found the music to have "the most imposing instrumental effect of any of the nocturnes," calling the crescendo and octaves "almost Lisztian."

Jim Samson notes that the nocturne intensifies "not through ornamentation, but through a new textural background." Kleczyński commented that the middle section "is the tale of a still greater grief told in an agitated recitando; celestial harps come to bring one ray of hope, which is powerless in its endeavor to calm the wounded soul, which...sends forth to heaven a cry of deepest anguish." The ending, according to Samson, is "in the nature of an elaborated 'feminine ending', articulating the reactive final beat of an amphibrach grouping."

=== No. 2 in F♯ minor ===
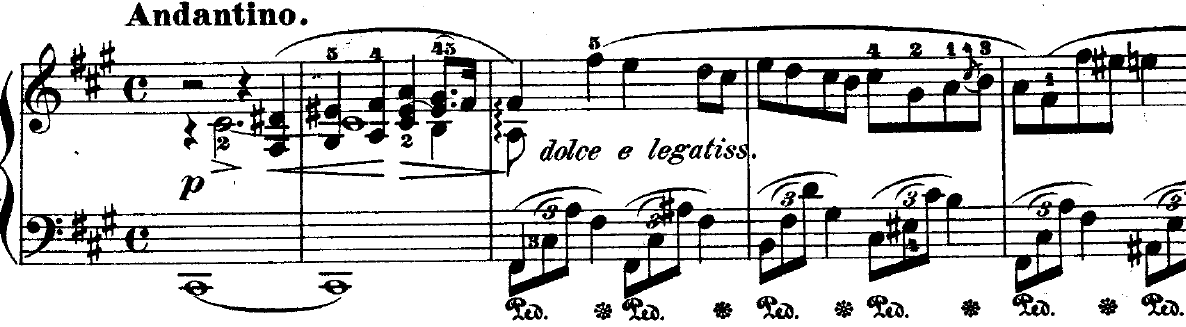
Opening bars from Op. 48 No. 2.

Recording by Luke Faulkner (Musopen)

The Nocturne in F♯ minor, Op 48, No. 2 is initially marked andantino and is in 4/4 meter. It switches to più lento at measure 57 and returns to the original tempo at measure 101. The piece is a total of 137 measures long.

When compared with the more melancholy outer themes, the middle section, più lento, is completely different—the piece modulates from minor to major (D♭), changes its meter to 3/4 and decreases tempo. Frederick Niecks commented that the middle section "is finer" and contains "soothing, simple chord progressions." Chopin once noted that the middle section was like a recitative and should be played as if "a tyrant commands, and the other asks for mercy." The recapitulation is cut short by the coda, which ends with trills, a rising arpeggio and final chord in F♯ major.
