= Polonaise-Fantaisie (Chopin) =

Piano composition by Frédéric Chopin

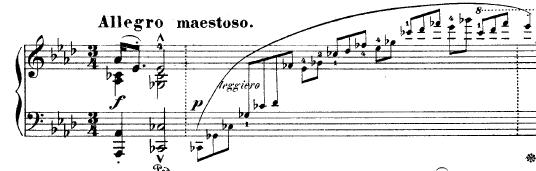
Incipit

The Polonaise-Fantaisie in A♭ major, Op. 61, is a composition for piano by Frédéric Chopin. It was dedicated to Madame A. Veyret, written in 1845-46 and published in 1846.

This work was slow to gain favour with musicians, due to its harmonic complexity and intricate form. Arthur Hedley was one of the first critics to speak positively of the work, writing in 1947 that it "works on the hearer's imagination with a power of suggestion equaled only by the F minor Fantasy or the fourth Ballade", although Sviatoslav Richter, Arthur Rubinstein, Jan Smeterlin, Leff Pouishnoff, Claudio Arrau and Vladimir Horowitz included it in their programs decades earlier.

It is intimately indebted to the polonaise for its metre, much of its rhythm, and some of its melodic character, but the fantaisie is the operative formal paradigm, and Chopin is said to have referred initially to the piece only as a Fantasy. Parallels with the Fantaisie in F minor include the work's overall tonality, A♭, the key of its slower middle section, B major, and the motive of the descending fourth.

F.Chopin: Polonaise-Fantasy Op.61
Performed by Giorgi Latso

Jeffrey Kallberg has suggested that the Polonaise-Fantaisie represents a change in Chopin's style from 'late' to 'last'. It is suggested that the formal ambiguities of the piece (particularly the unconventional and musically misleading transitions into and out of the lyrical inner section) are the most significant defining qualities of this 'last style', which only includes this and one other piece — the F minor Mazurka (Op. 68, No. 4), Chopin's last composition.

The piece plays a central role in Sandor Marai's novel Embers.
