= Ballade No. 2 (Chopin) =

Composition for piano by Frédéric Chopin

- Ballade by Frédéric Chopin
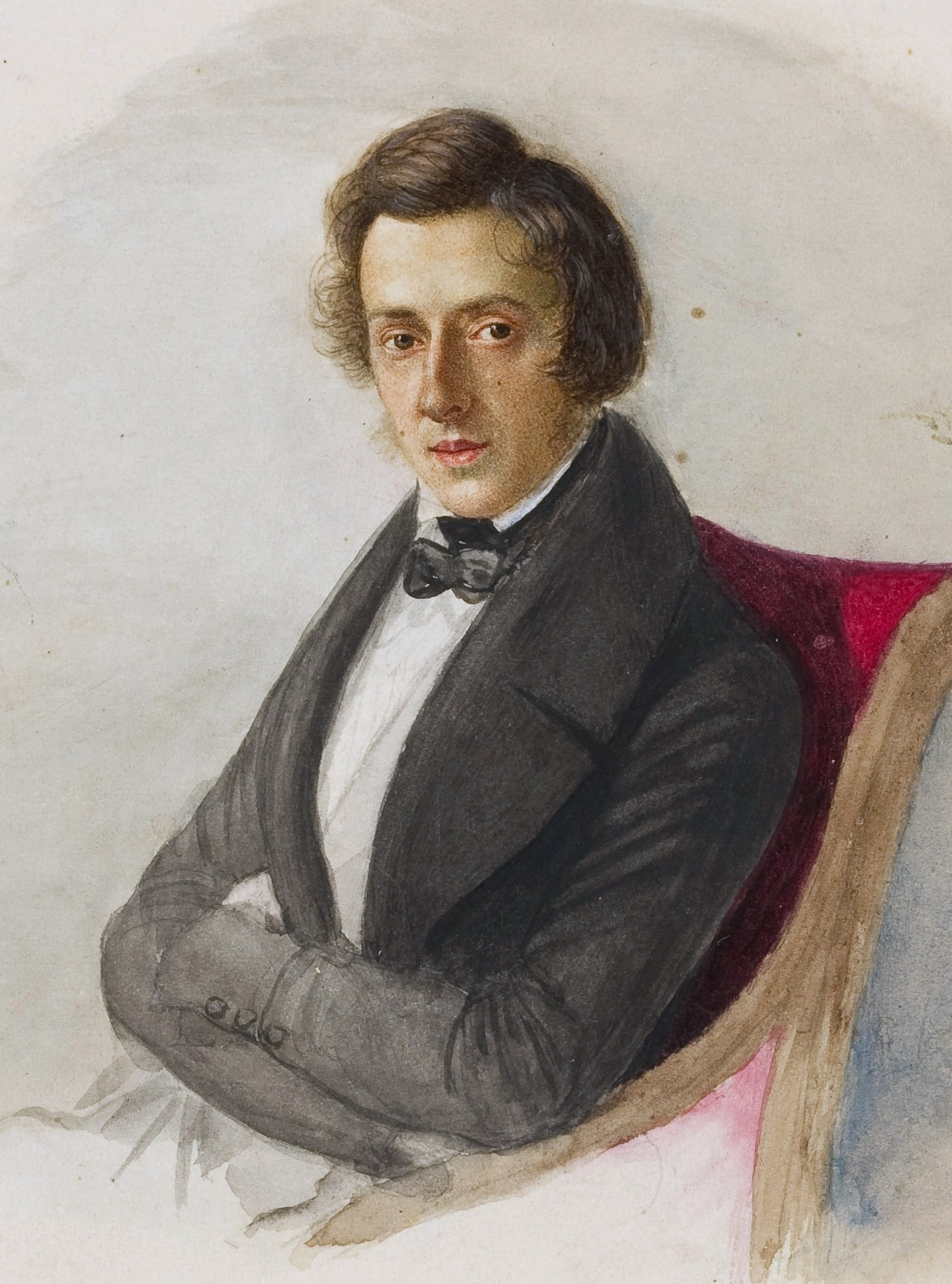
- Chopin at 25, by his fiancée Maria Wodzińska, 1835
- Key: F major
- Opus: 38
- Composed: 1839
- Dedication: Robert Schumann
- Published: 1839
- Duration: 7–8 minutes

The Ballade No. 2 in F major, Op. 38 is a ballade for solo piano by Frédéric Chopin, completed in 1839. A typical performance lasts seven to eight minutes.

== History ==
Ballade No. 2
Performed by Peter Johnston

Chopin started composing the ballade in 1836. It was one of various unfinished works he took with him to Mallorca for a winter stay with George Sand. Chopin announced completion of the ballade in a letter dated 14 December 1838, and by January 1840, he had sold the work to Breitkopf & Härtel for publication, along with the Piano Sonata No. 2, Scherzo No. 3, Polonaises Op. 40, Mazurkas Op. 41, Nocturnes Op. 37, and Impromptu No. 2.

Robert Schumann, who had dedicated his Kreisleriana, Op. 16, to Chopin, received the dedication of this ballade in return.

The piece has been criticized by some prominent pianists and musicologists, including its dedicatee Schumann, as a less ingenious work than the first. There is some degree of disagreement as to its inspiration, with the claim, often made that it was inspired by Adam Mickiewicz's poem Świtezianka, the lake of Willis, but this claim is unsubstantiated, and the Ballade No. 3 is sometimes attributed to this poem as well.

== Structure ==
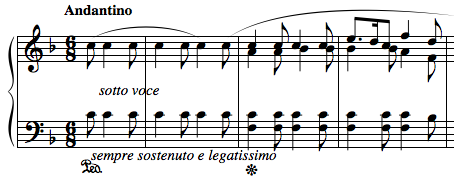
Opening bars of Ballade No. 2

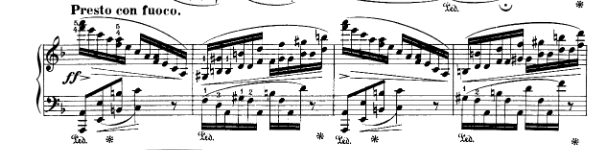
Beginning of the first "Presto con fuoco"

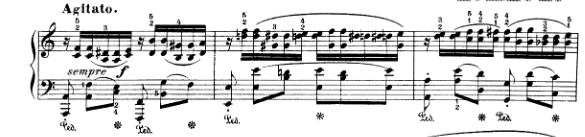
Begininning of the Agitato

As with Ballades Nos. 3 and 4, the Ballade No. 2 is written in compound duple (6/8) time.

It opens quietly on the dominant of the F major key, with repeated Cs in both the left and right hands. This quickly progresses to a melody and development with the performance instruction sotto voce (quietly). This section fades out with several repeated As in the right hand.

The next section of the ballade, in stark contrast to the first, opens with the performance instruction Presto con fuoco (very fast with fire). It is in an unusual key for a secondary melody; instead of being in the parallel minor of F minor, it is instead in A minor. Chopin scholar and biographer Frederick Niecks writes of it, "The entrance of the presto ... seems out of keeping with what precedes, but what we hear after... justifies the presence of the presto." The contrast of these two sections is likely an embodiment of the dedicatee Schumann's famous dual alter egos – Eusebius, which embodies a gentle, introspective, and dreamy nature, and Florestan, which embodies a volatile, passionate, and wrathful nature.

The piece shortly returns to its original tempo and style, and the first melody is further elaborated. Here, Chopin incorporates variations on the melody not present in the initial expository stage of the piece. This development progresses until the Presto con fuoco theme is reintroduced and recapitulated. This time, it is elaborated on as well before ending abruptly. The original F major theme is then echoed once more, but now in A minor (the key of the Presto), and the piece fades out. It is thus that the piece ends, without returning to its tonic key.

Like the other three ballades, this ballade is generally considered one of Chopin's most technically and musically demanding works.
