= Fantaisie in F minor (Chopin) =

Fantasy for solo piano by Frédéric Chopin

Fantaisie in F minor Op.49
- by Frédéric Chopin
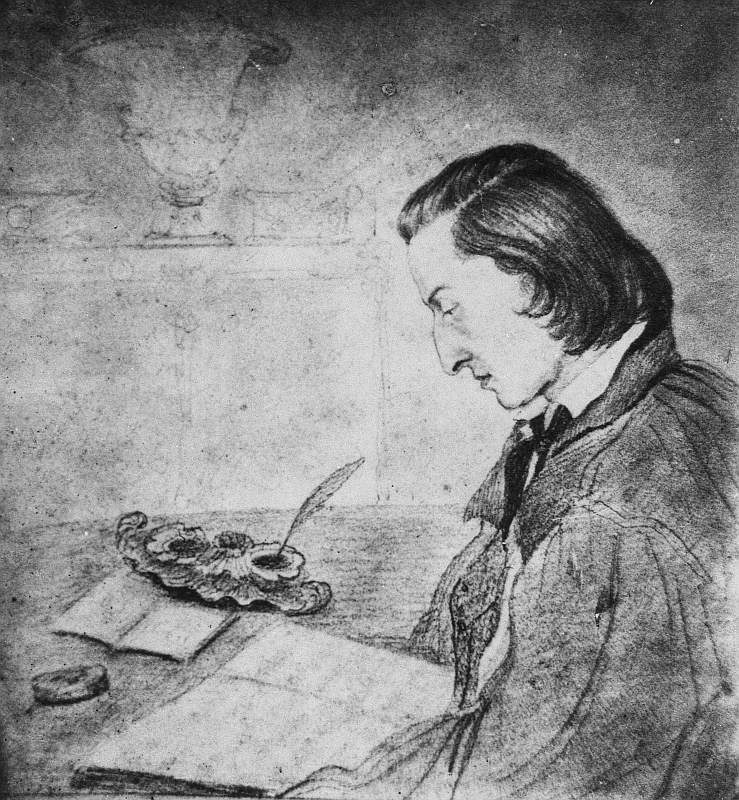
- Frederic Chopin in 1841, pencil drawing by George Sand
- Opus: 49
- Genre: Romantic
- Form: Fantasy
- Composed: 1841
- Movements: 1

The Fantaisie in F minor, Op. 49, by Frédéric Chopin is a single-movement work for the piano, composed in 1841, when he was 31 years old. From Chopin's letters it is known that he used the name "fantasy" to show some sort of freedom from rules and give a Romantic expression. Frédéric Chopin continued the tradition of a self-contained movement in his Fantaisie. This Fantaisie is one of Chopin's longest pieces, for solo piano, and is considered one of his greatest works.

The autograph manuscript of the work is preserved in the National Library of Poland.

== Form ==
This work belongs to the Fantasy form, a composition free in form and inspiration. It begins with a solemn marching theme that eventually plunges into a passionate and virtuosic section, the transition marked poco a poco … doppio movimento, still with elements of marching, but more triumphant and positive in mood. About halfway through the piece occurs a slow and sombre chorale-like section in B major, before the previous section is restated. After a short, quiet and sweet statement followed by a final flourish the work ends in a plagal cadence in A-flat major, the relative key. This piece is 11–14 minutes long.
