= International German Piano Award =

- Presented by: International Piano Forum Frankfurt
- First award: 2011; 15 years ago
- Website: ipf-frankfurt.com

The International German Piano Award is a yearly international music competition for classical piano music since 2011. The International Piano Forum is the initiator and organizer of the competition.

The prize money amounts to a total of 20,000 euros and aims to support outstanding pianists. A first international jury elects and nominates pianists under notary procedure. A second jury then votes for the laureate of the International German Piano Award. The following support of the nominated provides concerts at concert halls and contacts to conductors as well as orchestras. The International Piano Forum supports furthermore the production of CDs, websites and an artist portfolio. In the last years, the grand finale took place at the Alte Oper in Frankfurt am Main.

== Patrons ==
- Valery Gergiev
- Peter Ramsauer
- Petra Roth
- Lars Vogt

== Laureates ==
- 2011: Amir Tebenikhin
- 2012: Lukas Geniusas
- 2013: Dmitri Levkovich – The Audience-Award went to Thomas Wypior
- 2014: Misha Namirovsky – The Audience-Award went to Albertina Eunju
- 2015: Yekwon Sunwoo – The Audience-Award went to Andrejs Osokins
- 2016: Wataru Isasue
- 2017: Eric Lu – The FAZ-Audience-Award went to Eric Lu
- 2018: Hans H. Suh – The FAZ-Audience-Award went to Tomoki Sakata
- 2019: JeungBeum Sohn – The FAZ-Audience-Award went to Luka Okros
- 2021: Dmitry Ablogin
- 2022: Konstantin Emelyanov
- 2023: Andrey Gugnin
- 2024: Magdalene Ho

== Audience Awards ==
- 2013: Thomas Wypior
- 2014: Albertina Eunju Song
- 2015: Andrejs Osokins
- 2017: Eric Lu
- 2018: Tomoki Sakata
- 2019: Luka Okros
- 2021: Yekwon Sunwoo
- 2022: Konstantin Emelyanov
- 2023: Xuanyi Mao
- 2024: Maxim Lando

== Nominated pianists 2011–2024 ==
2011

- Nareh Arghamanyan,
- Joseph Moog,
- Christopher Park,
- Amir Tebenikhin,
- Hélène Tysman,
- Anna Winnitskaja,

2012

- Ah Ruem Ahn,
- Lukas Geniusas,
- Andrey Gugnin,
- Toghrul Huseynli,
- Ho Jeong Lee,
- Igor Levit,
- Dudana Mazmanishvili,
- Igor Tchetuev,

2013

- Gábor Farkas,
- Viviana Lasaracina,
- Dmitri Levkovich,
- Alexey Pudinov,
- Edoardo Turbil,
- Thomas Wypior,

2014

- Valentina Babor,
- David Gray,
- Lindsay Garritson,
- Misha Namirovsky,
- Jie Yuan,
- Albertina Eunju Song,

2015

- François Dumont,
- Ching-Yun Hu,
- Alexander Lubyantsev,
- Maria Mazo,
- Andrejs Osokins,
- Yekwon Sunwoo,
- Georgy Tchaidze,
- Andrew Tyson,
- Irene Veneziano,
- Alexander Yakovlev,

2017

- Moye Chen,
- Zhenni Li,
- Eric Lu,
- Fabio Martino,
- Jiayan Sun,
- Alexander Yakovlev

2018

- Alexei Melnikov
- Tomoki Sakata
- Hans H. Suh
- Antonina Suhanova
- Alexey Sychev
- Amadeus Wiesensee

2019

- Sergey Belyavskiy
- Lika Bibileishvili
- Sahun Hong
- Rodolfo Leone (Could not participate due to an illness)
- Luka Okros
- JeungBeum Sohn2021
- Dmitry Ablogin
- Jean-Selim Abdelmoula
- Hyelim Kim
- Jung Eun Séverine Kim
- Ziyu Liu
- Yeontaek Oh
- Ilia Papoian
- Youngho Park
- Philipp Scheucher2022
- Michelle Candotti
- Konstantin Emelyanov
- Ilia Papoian
- Jinhyung Park
- Dmitry Sin
- Slavomir Zaranok2023
- Raúl da Costa
- Andrey Gugnin
- Uladzislau Khandohi
- Jean-Michel Kim
- Seunghyun Lee
- Xuanyi Mao
- Alexei Melnikov
- Ilia Papoian
- Yongi Woo
- Suah Ye

2024

- Magdalena Ho
- Fuko Ishii
- Uladzislau Khandohi
- Maxim Lando
- Vitaly Starikov
- Xiaolu Zang

== Members of the jury since 2011 ==
- Ogtay Abasguliyev, Azerbaidschan
- Conrad van Alphen, Netherlands
- Paul Badura-Skoda, Austria
- Maurizio Baglini, Italy
- Eleonore Büning, Germany
- Alexander Buhr, Germany
- Hung-Kuan Chen, USA
- Paul Dan, Germany
- Gaetan Le Divelec, Great Britain
- Josep Caballé Domenech, Spain
- Thomas Duis, Germany
- Gudni Emilsson, Island
- Enrico Fischer, Germany
- Norma Fisher, Great Britain
- Renchang Fu, People's Republic of China
- Lukas Geniusas, Russia
- Petras Geniusas, Lithuania
- Bernd Goetzke, Germany
- Giorgi Jordania, Georgia
- Milton Rubén Laufer, USA
- Dmitri Levkovich, Ukraine
- David Lively, USA-France
- Alexei Ljubimow, Russia
- Wolfgang Manz, Germany
- Jura Margulis, Russia
- Siegfried Mauser, Germany
- Rudolf Meister, Germany
- Pablo Mielgo, Spain
- Dariusz Mikulski, Poland
- Ekaterina Murina, Russia
- Michael Ponti, USA
- Jorge Luis Prats, Kuba
- Wojciech Rajski, Poland
- Frederic Anthony Rzewski, Belgium
- Georg Friedrich Schenck, Germany
- Wolfram Schmitt-Leonardy, Germany
- Reinhard Seehafer, Germany
- Lior Shambadal, Israel
- Yekwon Sunwoo, South Korea
- Alexander Tchaikovsky, Russia
- Amir Tebenikhin, Kazakhstan
- Pieter Van Winkel, Netherlands
- Catherine Vickers, Germany
- Boian Videnoff, Bulgaria
- Sebastian Weigle, Germany
- Gregor Willmes, Germany
- Andrea Zietzschmann, Germany
