= Andrejs Osokins =

Latvian pianist

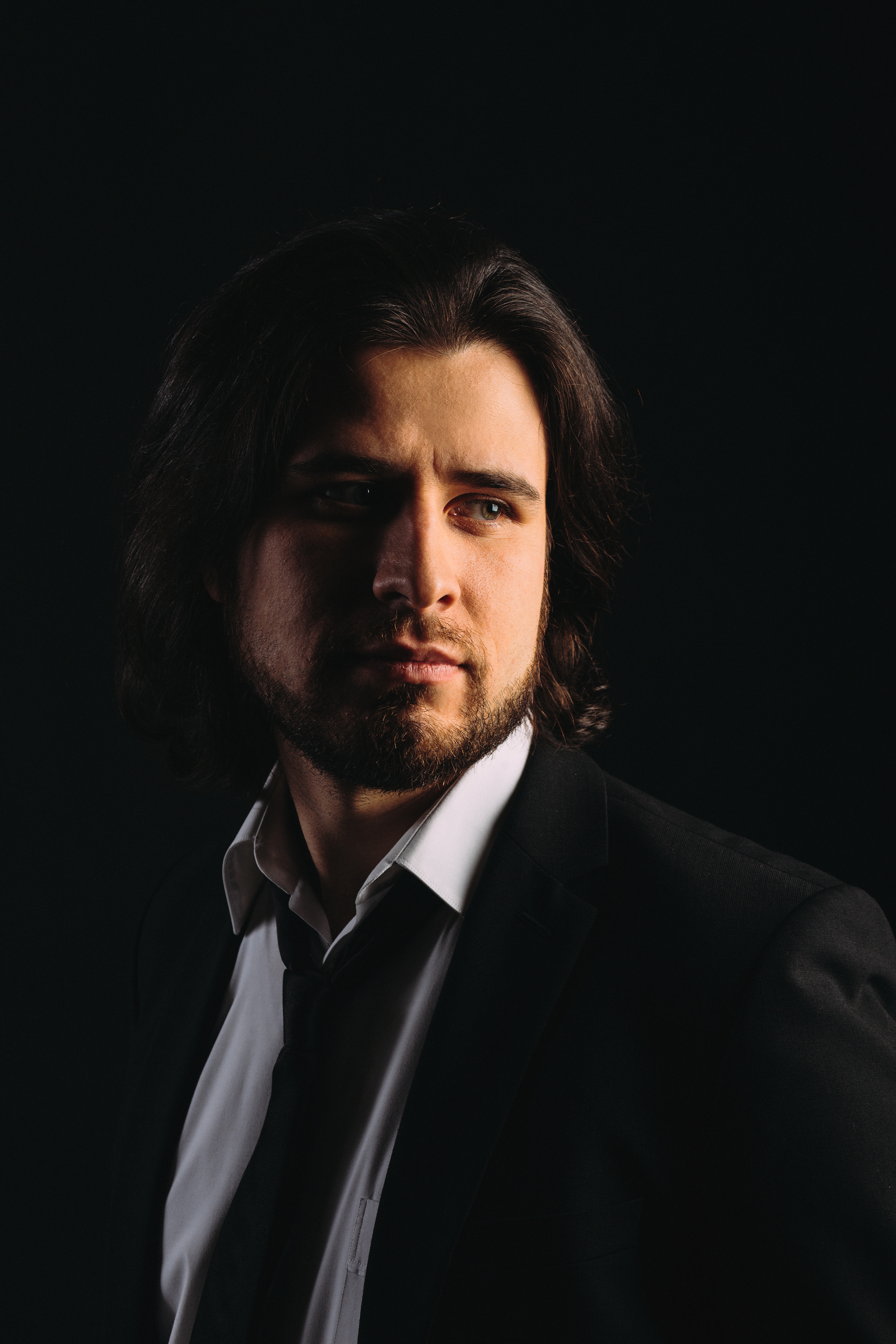
Andrejs Osokins

Andrejs Osokins is a Latvian pianist. He is laureate of several piano competitions, including the Arthur Rubinstein International Piano Master Competition in Tel Aviv, the Long-Thibaud International Competition in Paris, the Leeds International Piano Competition and the Queen Elisabeth International Piano Competition in Brussels. In April 2015 he became the Audience Awardee of the 5th International German Piano Award presented by International Piano Forum. In 2009 Osokins was awarded with the Grand Music Award 2008, which is the highest form of state recognition in the field of music in Latvia.

== Biography ==
Born in Riga, he began playing piano at the age of five and gave his first solo recital at the age of 14. After graduating BMus at the Latvian Academy of Music and winning the Yamaha Scholarship Award, Osokins moved to London and began his studies at Trinity College of Music, where he received both Licentiate and Fellowship Diplomas. He also won the Trinity College Music Competition for his performance of a Mozart concerto. In September 2008 Osokins joined the Royal Academy of Music, studying under the guidance of Hamish Milne. He has won the Lillian Davies Prize and the Christian Carpenter Piano Recital Prize and graduated Master of Arts in Performance in July 2011.

In March 2018 the Royal Academy of Music announced that Osokins had been elected Associate of the Royal Academy of Music (ARAM), an honor awarded to former students who have made a significant contribution to the music profession.

Several recent achievements include a return to the Berlin Philharmonic with Pyotr Tchaikovsky's Piano Concerto No. 1; a performance with the Kremerata Baltica chamber orchestra in Frankfurt's Alte Oper; a performance of Sergei Rachmaninoff's Piano Concerto No. 2, conducted by Vladimir Fedoseyev and with the Latvian National Symphony Orchestra; concert The Three Osokins at the Opera: New Program at the Latvian National Opera; a guest concert at the Konzerthaus Berlin with Georgijs Osokins with a performance of S. Rachmaninoff's Piano Concertos; and a solo concert at Milan's La Verdi concert hall. He has also recorded and released two solo albums – his first Live CD album in collaboration with International Piano Forum and his first studio CD album Dedication on the DUX Recording Producers label.

Osokins is co-creator of the concert program 100 Years with Piaf, which has been performed in more than 17 concerts throughout Latvia and in Finland and the jazz-theatre production After Midnight with singer and pianist Katrīna Gupalo which has been held in many concert halls in Latvia and in London, UK.

Osokins has performed with the National Orchestra of Belgium, the Orchestre philharmonique de Radio France, Manchester's The Hallé symphony orchestra, the Brighton Philharmonic Orchestra and Dublin's RTÉ National Symphony Orchestra, and under direction by conductors including Sir Mark Elder, Marin Alsop, Yuri Simonov, Bojan Videnov and James Judd, among others. He has performed in venues such as the National Concert Hall in Dublin, Wigmore Hall the St Martin in the Fields and Kings Place concert halls in London, the Gasteig concert hall in Munich, the La Monnaie concert hall in Brussels, the Opera Comique in Paris and the Symphony Hall in Birmingham.

Osokins performing the opening of S. Prokofiev's Piano Concerto No 3 with The Hallé orchestra conducted by Sir Mark Elder.

Osokins performing S. Rachmaninov's Piano Concerto No. 2 Op. 18 in C minor, Movement 1 together with Latvian National Symphony Orchestra, conductor – Vladimir Fedoseyev.

From 2015 Osokins became a member and an organizer of The Three Osokins piano dynasty project. Sergejs Osokins is an active performer and a teacher of master classes in Latvia, Germany, Norway, Poland, Sweden, Belarus, as well as in Denmark, where the pianist has a significant collaboration with the Royal Academy of Music. Georgijs Osokins' most significant event recently is entering the final of the XVIIth International Chopin competition in Poland and becoming a sensation of this competition.

The Three Osokins had become one of the most significant concert events in Latvian classical music scene – in 2015 three piano virtuosi of Osokins dynasty: Andrejs, Georgijs and Sergejs played together for the first time for the fully packed Dzintari Concert Hall (Jūrmala, Latvia), and the next year their concert in Latvian National Opera was broadcast worldwide by the German internet television Klassik.TV. The Three Osokins have performed in Latvia at the Latvian National Opera, the concert hall Great Amber in Liepāja, Dzintari Concert Hall in Jūrmala and at the Theatre House Jūras vārti in Ventspils and in Poland. Each concert is an event in and of itself, because each is carefully assembled, scripted, and filled with pieces that have been specially adapted to be performed by three pianos.

In 2018, the pianists released their first studio album The Three Osokins in Latvian Piano Music. The album is dedicated to Latvia's centennial and to better-known works of piano music by Latvian composers.

Osokins has collaborated with violinist Kristīne Balanas as the Duo LV, and in trio with sisters Kristine Balanas and cellist Margarita Balanas, in his collaboration with the Quattro Baltic string quartet and in the master classes he regularly teaches in Latvia and abroad.
