= Wratislavia Chamber Orchestra =

Polish string orchestra

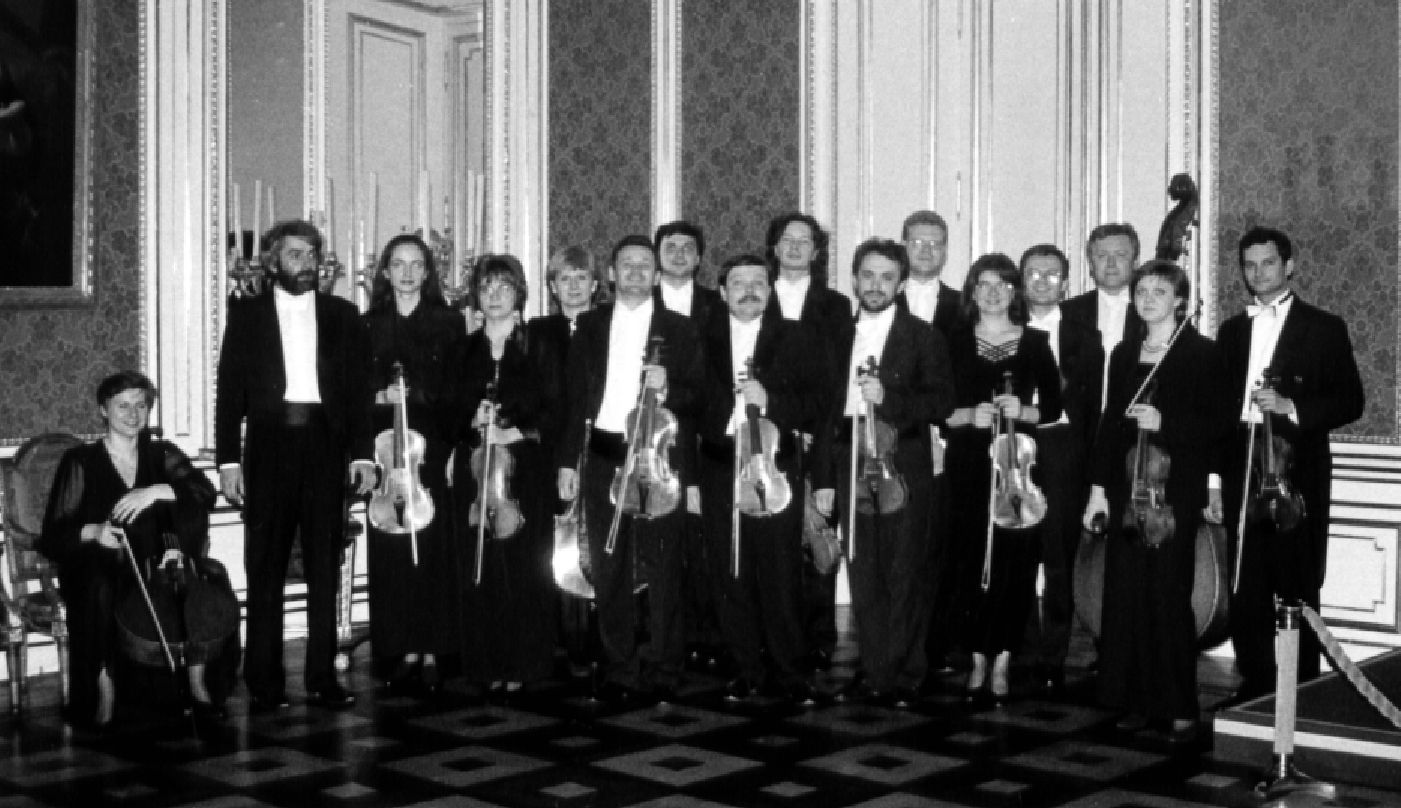
The Wratislavia Chamber Orchestra during the inaugural concert, Warsaw 1996

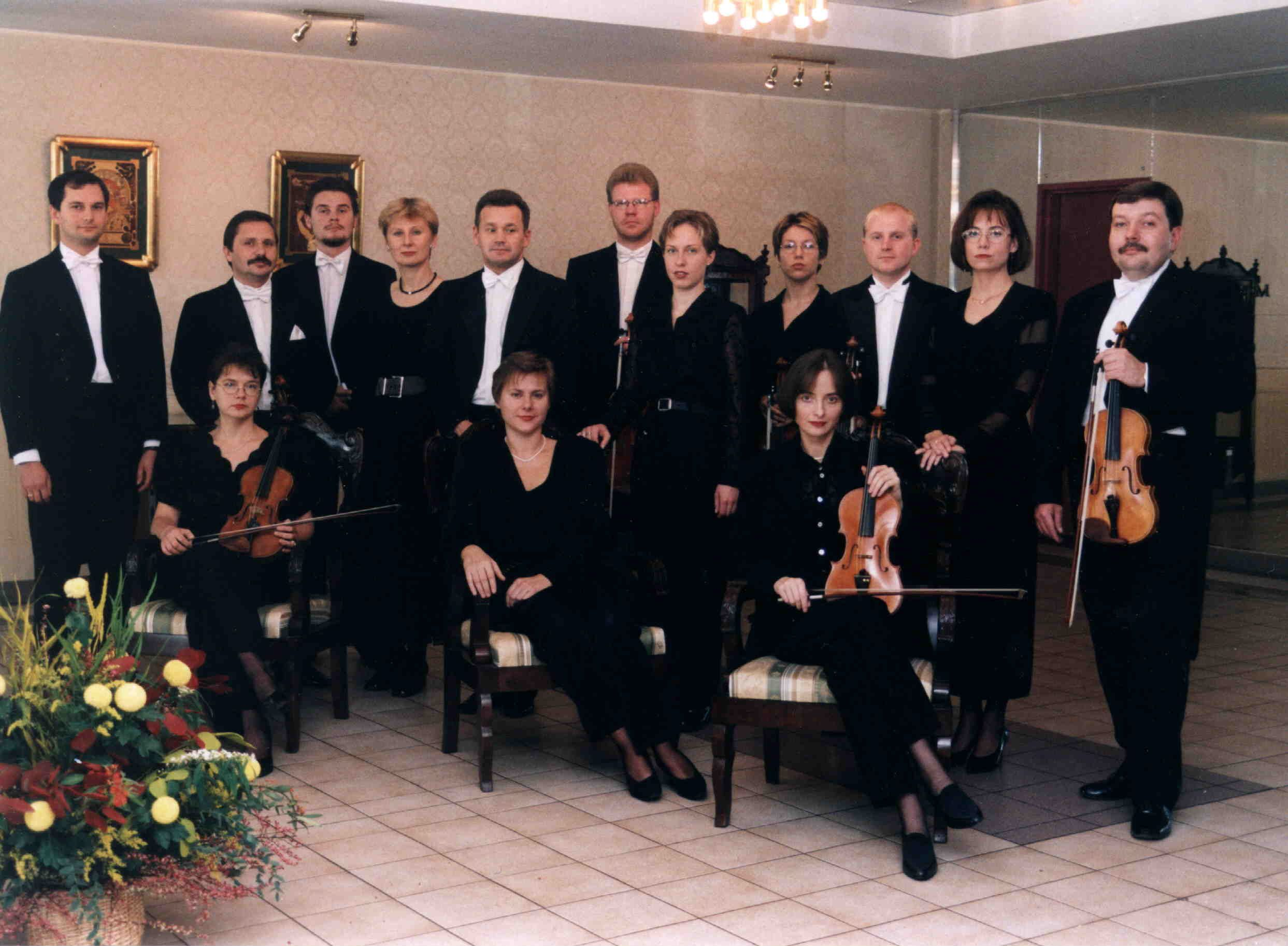
The Wratislavia Chamber Orchestra, 1998

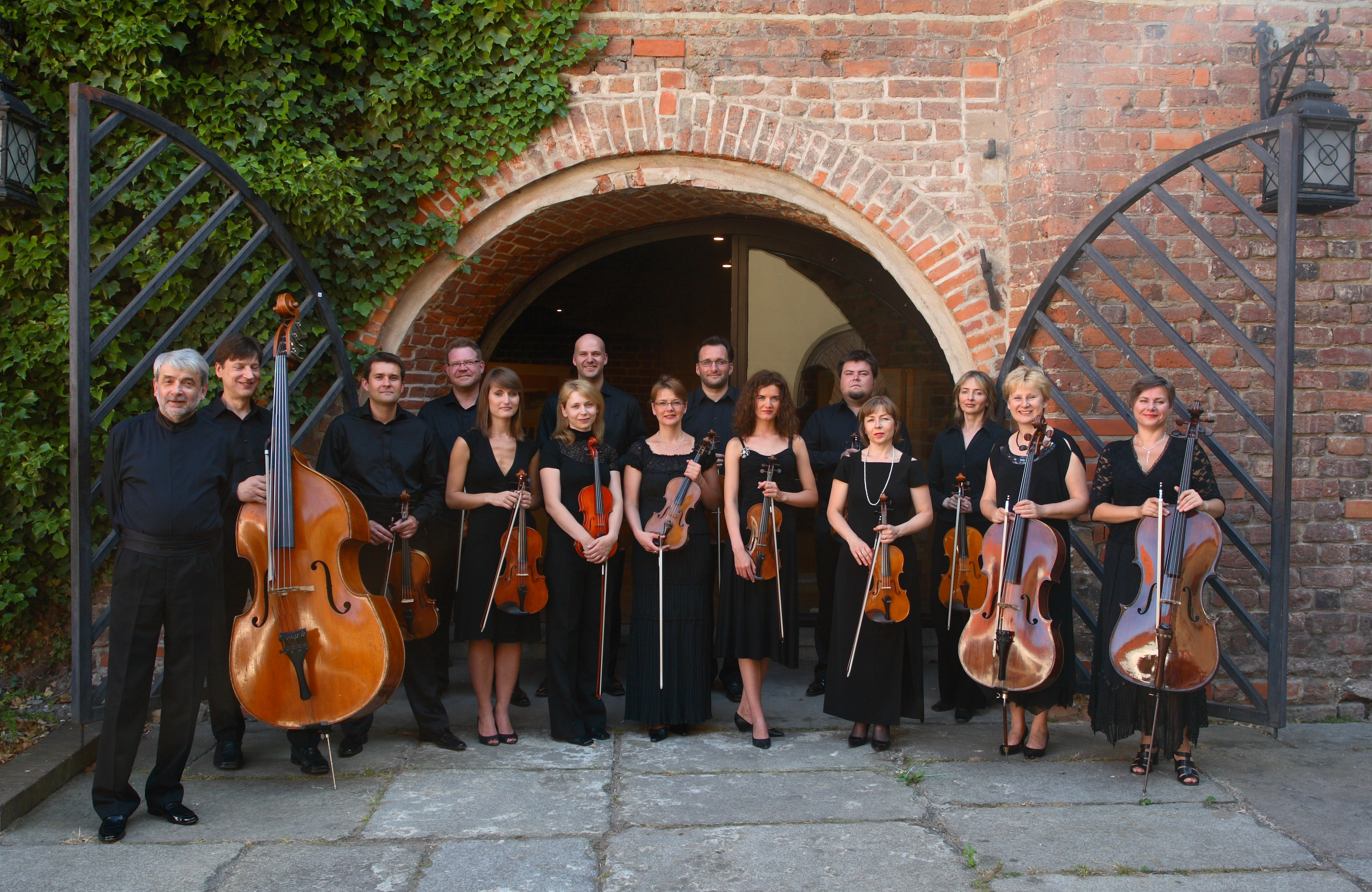
The Wratislavia Chamber Orchestra, 2010

The Wratislavia Chamber Orchestra – Polish string orchestra founded in 1996 by the outstanding virtuoso violinist Jan Stanienda who is the orchestra's concertmaster, as well as its conductor. Wratislavia plays music ranging from baroque to contemporary, and uses the classic framework of a Mozartian orchestra, increasing the ensemble as the repertoire requires.

== The prior concerts ==
The musicians of Wratislavia have performed with Yehudi Menuhin, Grzegorz Nowak, Krystian Zimerman, James Galway, Pawel Przytocki and Sharon Kam, among others. They formed the core of the string section of Sinfonia Helvetica, which performed in Italy and in Switzerland, and of the Menuhin Festival Orchestra, which had concert tours of Japan (Suntory Hall in Tokyo, Salamanca Hall in Gifu, and Symphony Hall in Osaka) and Germany (Beethovenhalle in Bonn, Philharmonie Gasteig in Munich). They performed also in Waterfront Hall in Belfast, Symphony Hall in Birmingham and in Berlin Philharmonie. They participated in creating the musical setting of the 1996 Summer Olympics in Atlanta.

The Orchestra's first concert took place in the festival Warsaw Music Encounters Early Music – New Music, 1996. And then a streak of other concerts followed. To name a few places and occasions: Warsaw (National Philharmonic, Royal Castle), Łańcut (Music Festival), Wrocław (Wratislavia Cantans and Musica Polonica Nova), Saint Petersburg and Siberia (the Polish Culture Season in Russia, 2008), Tonhalle in Zurich, China (Introduction to the Chopin's Year in China, 2009/2010) and Mexico (Festival Internacional Cervantino and Festival de Música de Morelia Miguel Bernal Jimenez, 2010). Wratislavia participated in creating the musical setting of the inauguration ceremony of the 46th Eucharistic Congress in Wrocław, 1996, in the gracious presence of Pope John Paul II.

Wratislavia played with some great musicians such as Øystein Baadsvik, Otto Sauter, Jadwiga Rappé, Piotr Paleczny, Urszula Kryger, Łukasz Kuropaczewski, Jeffrey Swann, Ingolf Wunder, Hinrich Alpers, Agata Szymczewska, Lukas Geniušas, Plamena Mangova.

== Chamber Music Festival Arsenal Nights ==
The ensemble have dreamed up and became the host of a new original cultural event, which since 1997 has become a fixed part of the musical calendar of Wrocław – the annual Chamber Music Festival Arsenal Nights. The festival which binds in a unique harmony the refined tastes and exceptional performances of world's chamber music, with the architectural beauty of the magnificent relic of ancient city armoury in Wrocław.

== Recordings ==
- Serenades – Dvořák, Elgar, Tschaikovsky (1997, re-edition 2008)
- Polish Music – Polish Anonymous, Janiewicz, Słowiński, Radziwiłł, Twardowski, Augustyn (2001) – nominated to FRYDERYK 2001 (Polish top musical award)
- Le Streghe 2 – Katarzyna Duda, violin (2001) – nominated to FRYDERYK 2002
- Mozart – Violin Concertos No. 4 & No. 5 – Dominika Falger, violin (2004) – The Wrocław's CD of the Year, 2004 by Gazeta Wyborcza
- The Baroque Oboe Concertos – Kama Grott, oboe (2006)
- Mozart – Violin Concertos No. 1 & No. 2, Adagio, Rondos – Dominika Falger, violin (2006)
- Mozart – Violin Concerto No. 3, Sinfonia Concertante – Dominika Falger, violin; Johannes Flieder, viola (2007)
- Haydn – Cello Concertos, Denisov – Tod ist ein langer Schlaf – Marcin Zdunik, cello (2009) – awarded with FRYDERYK 2010
