= Shiran Wang =

Chinese pianist (born 1989)

- Born: December 15, 1989 (age 35); Jiangsu, Nanjing, China
- Education: International Piano Academy Lake Como
- Occupation: Pianist
- Musical career
- Origin: Beijing
- Genres: Classical music
- Labels: Sony Music (From 2012)
- Website: www.wangshiran.com

Shiran Wang (王詩然; born December 15, 1989, in Nanjing) is a Chinese pianist who has performed internationally.

Wang started to play the piano at the age of four and a half, when she was 11 years old she began studying the piano in Beijing, China with Professor Aiping Jin in the Middle School at the Central Conservatory of Music. At the age of fifteen, she was awarded the First Prize at the Fourth International Prokofiev Piano Competition in Ukraine, winner of the Seventh Arthur Rubinstein Youth Pianist competition in Poland in 2007 and the Fourth Rachmaninoff International Piano Competition held in Moscow in 2008. She has studied with professor Dang Thai Son as well as at the International Piano Academy Lake Como with professors Dmitri Bashkirov, Fou Ts'ong and William Grant Naboré.

She has been invited to perform with orchestras including the North Czech Philharmonic Orchestra, Rome Symphony Orchestra, Dubrovnik Symphony Orchestra, State of Mexico Symphony Orchestra, Moravian Philharmonic Orchestra, Slovak Radio Symphony Orchestra and the State Philharmonic Orchestra of Daejeon, Korea. She has also staged solo concerts for the works of specific composers, such as the solo concerts for Rachmaninoff and Chopin in Hong Kong. She performed with the Škampa Quartet at the International Music Festival Český Krumlov in 2014.

Shiran Wang's first album was published and released by China Record Corporation in 2007 and will record Shostakovich's Piano Concerto No. 1 and Piano Concerto No. 2 with the conductor Maxim Shostakovich, and Rachmaninoff's Piano Concerto No. 2 and Piano Concerto No. 3 with the Rome Symphony Orchestra.
