= François Dumont =

François Dumont may refer to:

- François Dumont (sculptor) (1688–1729), French sculptor
- François Dumont (painter) (1751–1831), French painter of portrait miniatures
- François Dumont (pianist) (born 1985), French classical pianist
