= Yulianna Avdeeva =

Russian pianist (born 1985)

- Юлианна Авдеева
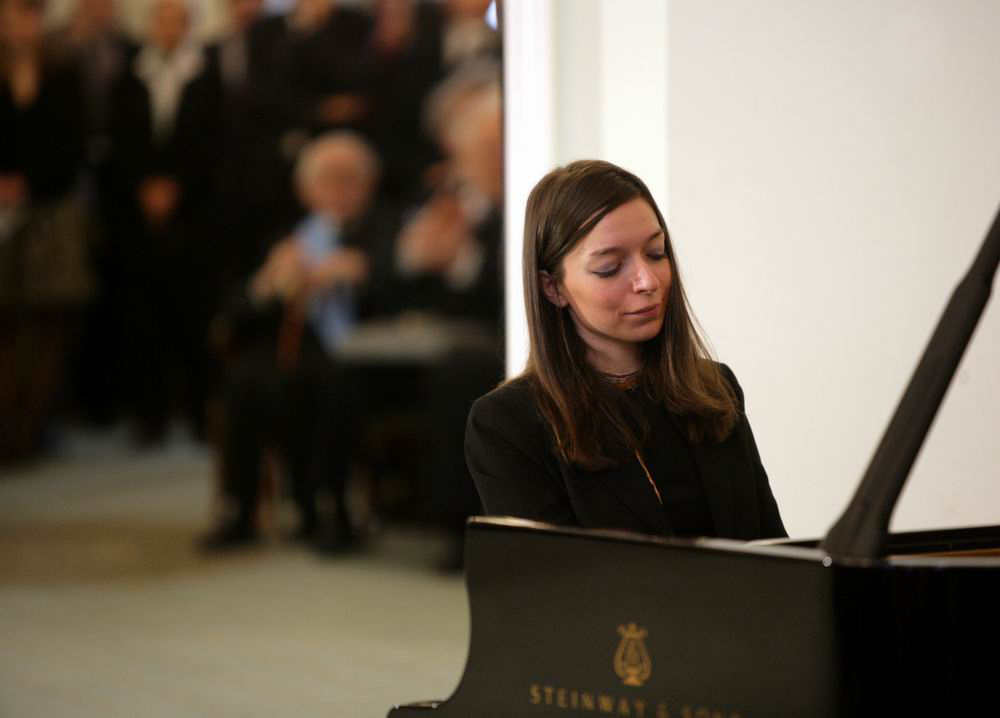
- Avdeeva playing for the Polish president in 2010
- Born: 3 July 1985 (age 41); Moscow, Soviet Union
- Education: Gnessin State Musical College; Zurich University of the Arts; International Piano Academy Lake Como
- Occupation: Classical pianist
- Awards: (gold) First Prize, XVI International Chopin Piano Competition
- Website: www.avdeevapiano.com

Yulianna Andreevna Avdeeva (Russian: Юлиа́нна Андре́евна Авде́ева; born 3 July 1985) is a Russian classical pianist.

== Life and career ==
Avdeeva was born in Moscow. She started piano lessons at the age of five, studied at the Gnessin Special School of Music in Moscow, and graduated from the Zurich University of the Arts. After her graduation, she became assistant to her teacher, Konstantin Scherbakov. From 2008, Avdeeva studied at the International Piano Academy Lake Como with Dmitri Bashkirov. In 2010, Avdeeva won First Prize in the XVI International Chopin Piano Competition. She is the fourth woman to have won this title, after Halina Czerny-Stefańska, Bella Davidovich (ex aequo in 1949) and Martha Argerich (1965).

During the COVID-19 pandemic, Avdeeva streamed weekly Bach podcasts to stay in touch with her audience.

On 5 July 2020, Avdeeva—together with Dmitry Masleev and Daniil Trifonov—livestreamed the premieres of several juvenilia and other unpublished piano works by Dmitri Shostakovich.

In the summer of 2021, she played several European festivals, following which she undertook a concert tour of Germany and Austria.

She has performed and toured with a wide variety of orchestras and performers, including Julia Fischer and Gidon Kremer. She has also collaborated with cellist Sol Gabetta.

== Awards ==
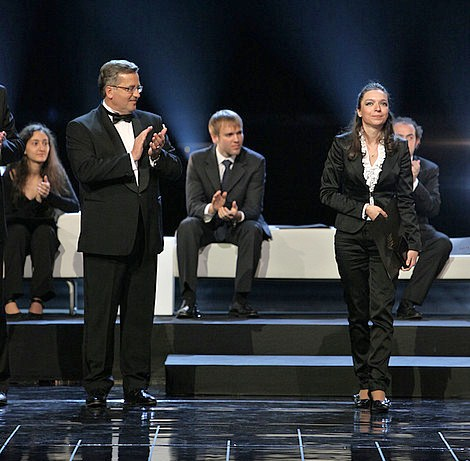
Avdeeva (r.) being awarded First Prize at the 2010 Chopin competition by Polish president Bronisław Komorowski

- 2003 – 9th European Piano Contest Bremen – 2nd prize.
- 2006 – 61st Geneva International Music Competition (Geneva) – 2nd prize.
- 2007 – 7th International Paderewski Piano Competition (Bydgoszcz) – 2nd prize.
- 2010 – XVI International Chopin Piano Competition (Warsaw) – 1st prize and best performance of a sonata

== Discography ==
- 2012: Chopin: Piano Concertos Nos. 1 & 2 with Orchestra of the 18th Century, Frans Brüggen (conductor) on 1849 Erard fortepiano
- 2014: Schubert: Drei Klavierstücke (Three Piano Pieces), D. 946; Prokofiev: Piano Sonata No. 7 in B-flat major, Op. 83; Chopin: 24 Préludes Op. 28 (Mirare 252, 2 CDs; distribution: Harmonia Mundi)
- 2016: Mozart: Piano Sonata No. 6 in D major, K. 284; Chopin: Fantaisie in F minor, Op. 49; Liszt: Après une lecture du Dante - Fantasia quasi sonata; from Verdi's Aida: Danza sacra e duetto finale, S. 436 (Mirare, 1 CD; distribution: Harmonia Mundi)
- 2017: Bach: English Suite No. 2 in A Minor, BWV 807; Toccata in D Major, BWV 912; Overture in the French Style in B Minor, BWV 831 (Mirare 328)
- 2023: Resilience (Pentatone PTC 5187 073)
- 2024: Chopin: Voyage (Pentatone PTC 5187 233)
- 2025: Shostakovich, Preludes & Fugues, Op.87 (Pentatone PTC 5187 480)
- 2026: Liszt, Metanoia
