= Balana (disambiguation) =

Balana is a village in Central Province, Sri Lanka.

Balana may also refer to:

- Bălana, a right tributary of the river Ghighiu in Romania
- Balana fort, fort built by the Kingdom of Kandy near Alagalla Mountain Range, Sri Lanka
- Ballon, County Carlow, Ireland, a village

== See also ==
- Balanas
