= Orchesterverein der Gesellschaft der Musikfreunde in Wien =

The Orchesterverein der Gesellschaft der Musikfreunde in Wien (Orchestral Association of the Society of Music Lovers in Vienna) is Vienna's oldest amateur ensemble. It was founded in 1859.

== History ==
The Orchestral Association was created in 1859 as a daughter association of the Gesellschaft der Musikfreunde (Society of Music Lovers). At that time, the term amateurs (or dilettanti as they were also called) was not a pejorative one. It simply defined the real music lover as opposed to the professional musician. Many of these amateurs were fairly well trained, and their ensembles, often supported by professionals, gave public performances. Johannes Brahms conducted the ensemble and played the piano, Lovro von Matačić also worked as a conductor, whereas the violinist Arnold Rosé, the pianists Jörg Demus and Paul Badura-Skoda were accompanied by the Orchestral Association. The Orchestral Association was involved in the early performances of several artists including the violinist Henryk Szeryng and the pianists Alfred Brendel, Mitsuko Uchida and Ingolf Wunder.

The Orchestral Association was prominent in Vienna through the 19th century, but participation declined over the 20th century. In 1993, the Orchestral Association had only 14 members and was on the brink of disbanding until it merged with another amateur ensemble. Since 2004, the Orchesterverein has been cooperating with the Akademische Bläserphilharmonie (Academic Wind Philharmonics), which makes more demanding programmes feasible. To maintain quality, the Orchestral Association does present more than three concert programmes a year.

== Sources ==
- Wolfgang Schubert: Der Orchesterverein der Gesellschaft der Musikfreunde in Wien. Hamburg 2009 (Studien zur Musikwissenschaft Bd. 18) ISBN 978-3-8300-4874-9
- Manfred Merk: Nach den Sternen greifen. In: Musikfreunde – Zeitschrift der Gesellschaft der Musikfreunde Wien, März 2011
