= François Dumont (pianist) =

French musician

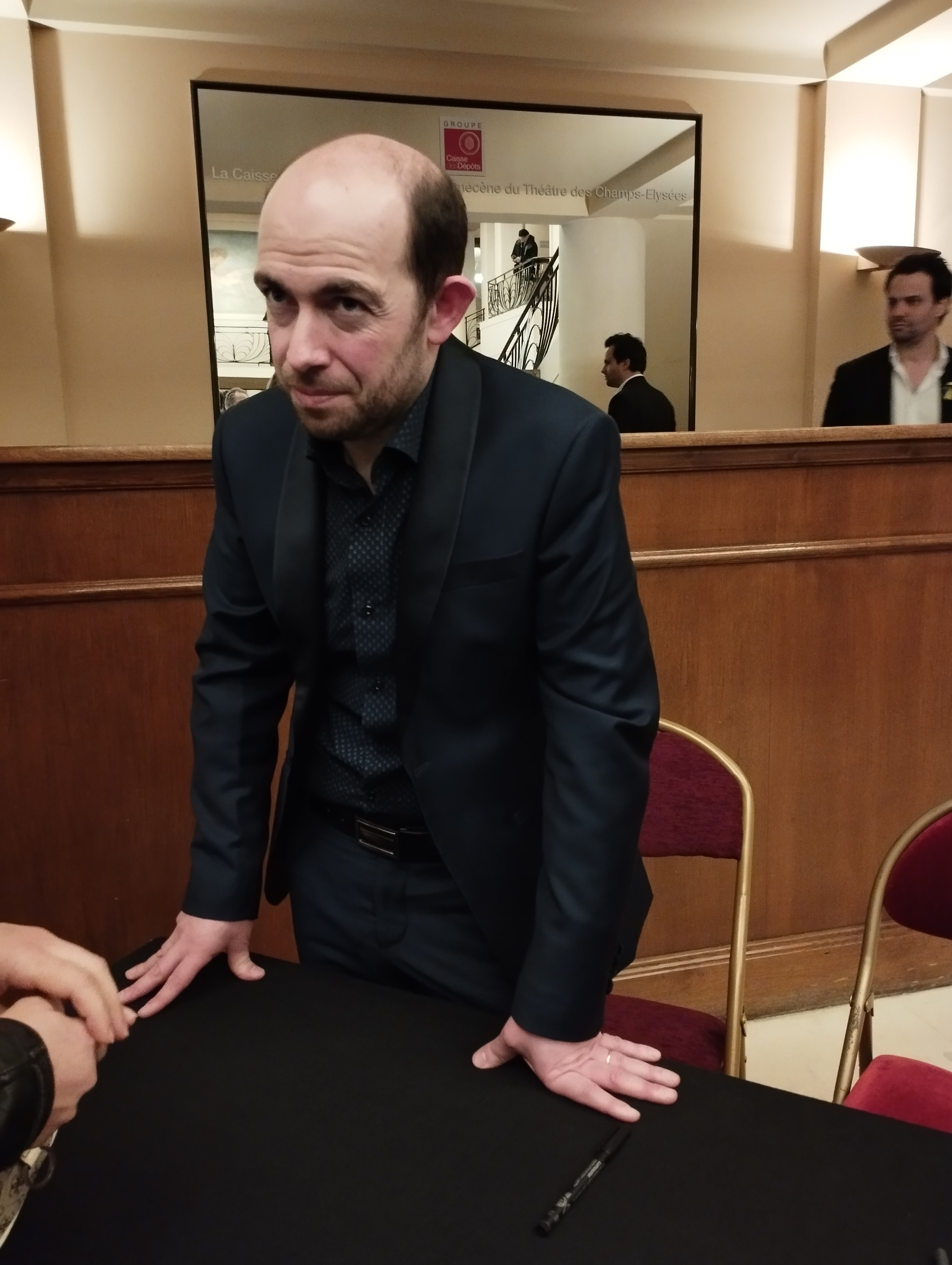
François Dumont in 2023

François Dumont (French pronunciation: [fʁɑ̃swa dymɔ̃]; born 19 October 1985 in Lyon, France) is a French classical pianist.

Dumont is notable for winning fifth prize in the sixteenth International Chopin Piano Competition. He has also won First Prize in the Jean Françaix International Competition in 2007 and First Prize in the Steinway International Piano Competition in 2002, and is also a laureate of the Perlemuter, Clara Haskil, Hamamatsu and Piano Campus piano competitions. He obtained the Grand Piano Prize of Spedidam in 2005 and the "Declic" Prize from the French Government.

== Biography ==
Dumont was born in Lyon on 19 October 1985 and began to learn the piano at the age of five. At the age of fourteen, Dumont entered the Conservatoire de Paris, where he studied with Bruno Rigutto and Hervé Billaut. Other mentors of Dumont include Murray Perahia, Menahem Pressler, Dmitri Bashkirov, Leon Fleisher, William Grant Naboré, Paul Badura-Skoda, Pierre-Laurent Aimard, Stanislav Ioudenitch, and Fou Ts'ong. He also honed his piano skills at the International Piano Academy Lake Como.

Dumont has been invited to perform with orchestras in Lyon, Montpellier, Corsica, and Paris, playing concertos by Poulenc and Mozart as well as Bach concertos for three and four pianos with Bruno Rigutto. In 2006, he performed Chopin's Piano Concerto No. 2 with the Liepāja Symphony Orchestra in Latvia.

== Discography ==
- Mozart, Complete Sonatas for Piano (2009), Anima Records
- Works by Messiaen and Dusapin, with Trio Elégiaque, rewarded with a Diapason D'or
- Haydn, Trio No. 39; Antonín Dvořák, Dumky
- Ravel, Complete Piano Music for piano solo. Piano Classics 2013 (Double CD)
