= Balanas =

Balanas is a surname. Notable people with the surname include:

- Kristine Balanas (born 1990), Latvian violinist
- Margarita Balanas (born 1993), Latvian cellist
