= XVI International Chopin Piano Competition =

Piano competition (2010)

The Sixteenth International Fryderyk Chopin Piano Competition
- Official poster
- Date: October 3–20, 2010
- Venue: National Philharmonic, Warsaw
- Hosted by: Fryderyk Chopin Institute
- Winner: (Russia) Yulianna Avdeeva
- Website: http://konkurs.chopin.pl

The XVI International Chopin Piano Competition (Polish: XVI Międzynarodowy Konkurs Pianistyczny im. Fryderyka Chopina) was held in Warsaw, Poland from 3 to 20 October 2010, for the first time organized by the Fryderyk Chopin Institute. Prize winners' concerts were held October 21–23. The first prize was awarded to Yulianna Avdeeva.

== Winners ==
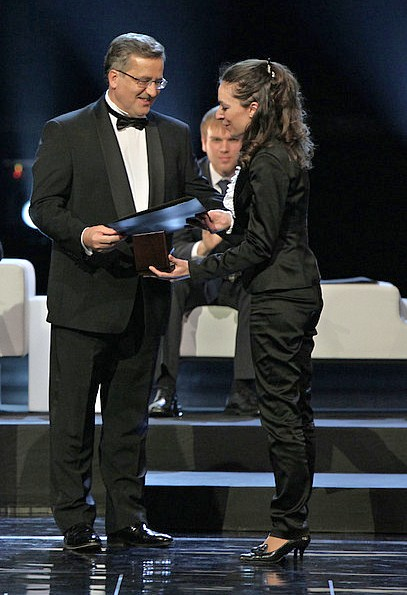
Polish President Bronisław Komorowski awarding the first prize to Yulianna Avdeeva

The competition consisted of three stages and a final.

The following prizes were awarded:

Prize		Winner	
1st place, gold medalist(s)	€30,000	Yulianna Avdeeva	Russia
2nd place, silver medalist(s)	€25,000	Lukas Geniušas	Russia; Lithuania
2nd place, silver medalist(s)	€25,000	Ingolf Wunder	Austria
3rd place, bronze medalist(s)	€20,000	Daniil Trifonov	Russia
4th	€15,000	Evgeni Bozhanov	Bulgaria
5th	€10,000	François Dumont	France
6th	not awarded		
F	€4,000	Nikolay Khozyainov	Russia
F	€4,000	Miroslav Kultyshev	Russia
F	€4,000	Pawel Wakarecy	Poland
F	€4,000	Hélène Tysman	France

In addition, five special prizes were awarded independently:

Special prize	Winner	
Best Performance of a Concerto	Ingolf Wunder	Austria
Best Performance of Mazurkas	Daniil Trifonov	Russia
Best Performance of a Polonaise	Lukas Geniušas	Russia; Lithuania
Best Performance of a Sonata	Yulianna Avdeeva	Russia
Best Performance of the Polonaise-Fantaisie	Ingolf Wunder	Austria

== Jurors ==
The jury panel for the competition included:

- (Argentina) Martha Argerich ( (gold) VII)
- (United States) Bella Davidovich ( (gold) IV)
- (Poland) Jan Ekier (honorary chairman)
- (France) Philippe Entremont
- (Brazil) Nelson Freire
- (Poland) Adam Harasiewicz ( (gold) V)
- (Poland) Andrzej Jasiński (chairman)
- (United States) Kevin Kenner ( (silver) XII)
- (Japan) Michie Koyama
- (Poland) Piotr Paleczny (vice-chairman)
- (Poland) Katarzyna Popowa-Zydroń
- (Vietnam) (Canada) Đặng Thái Sơn ( (gold) X)
- (United Kingdom) Fou Ts'ong ( (bronze) V)

== Participants ==
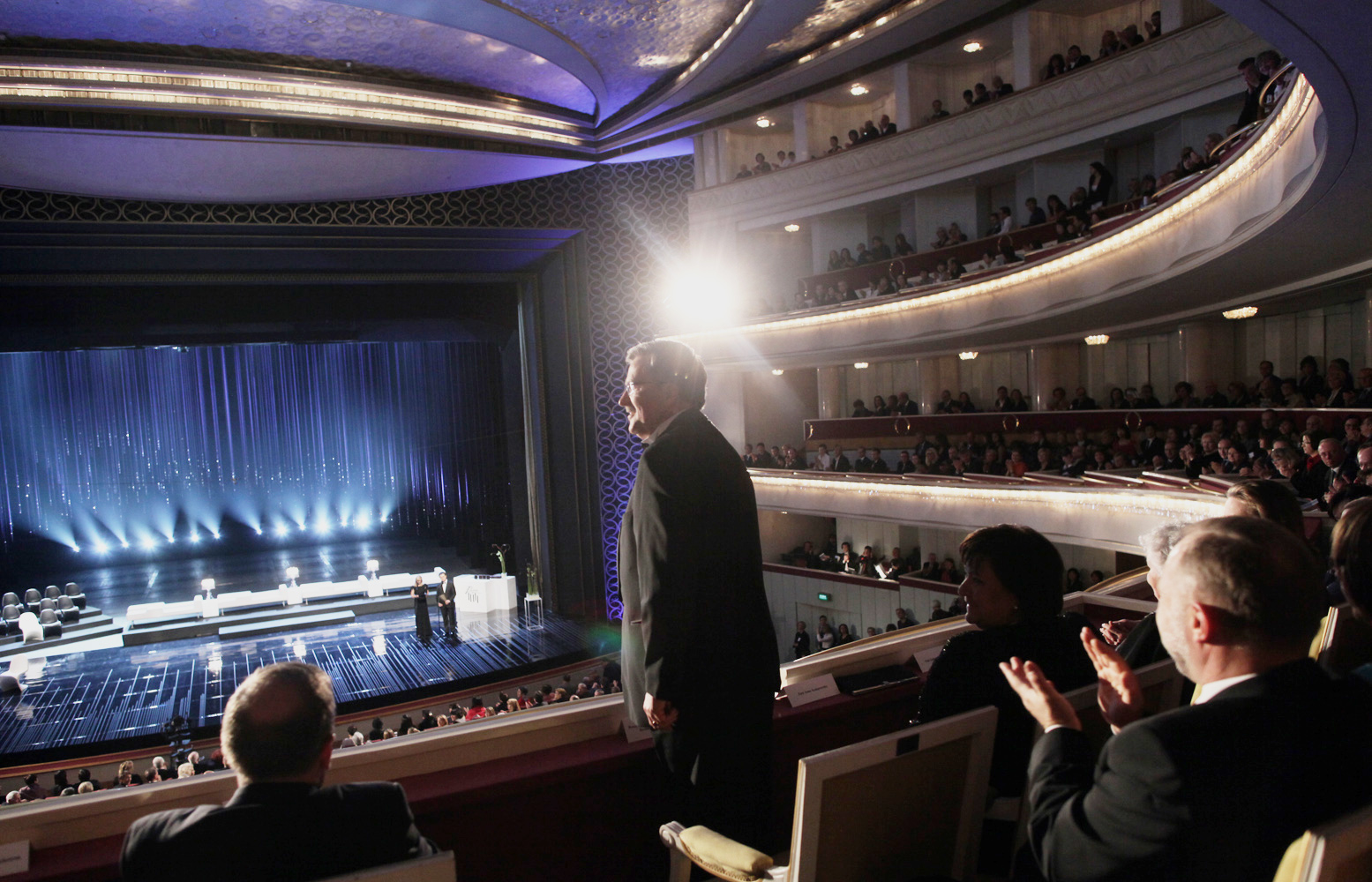
Polish President Bronisław Komorowski at the Laureates' Concert, October 2010

=== Results ===
Contestant	I	II	III	F
(South Korea) Soo Jung Ann	No			
(Italy) Leonora Armellini	Yes	Yes	No	
(Russia) Yulianna Avdeeva	Yes	Yes	Yes	1
(Syria) Fares Marek Basmadji	No			
(Bulgaria) Evgeni Bozhanov	Yes	Yes	Yes	4th
(Poland) Marek Bracha	Yes	No		
(Hong Kong) Rachel Wai-Ching Cheung	Yes	Yes	No	
(China) Fei-Fei Dong	Yes	Yes	No	
(France) François Dumont	Yes	Yes	Yes	5th
(Russia) Denis Evstukhin	No			
(Ukraine) Anna Fedorova	Yes	No		
(Japan) Madoka Fukami	No			
(Lithuania) Lukas Geniušas	Yes	Yes	Yes	2
(Canada) Leonard Gilbert	Yes	No		
(Australia) Jayson Gilham	Yes	Yes	No	
(Japan) Eri Goto	No			
(Italy) Giuseppe Greco	No			
(France) Antoine de Grolée	No			
(China) Peng Cheng He	Yes	No		
(China) Bo Hu	No			
(Taiwan) Ching-Yun Hu	Yes	No		
(Taiwan) Shih-Wei Huang	No			
(United States) Claire Huangci	Yes	Yes	No	
(Japan) Junna Iwasaki	Yes	No		
(China) Julian Zhi Chao Jia	No			
(Japan) Kaoru Jitsukawa	No			
(Croatia) Aljoša Jurinić	No			
(Japan) Airi Katada	Yes	No		
(Armenia) Lusine Khachatryan	No			
(Russia) Nikolay Khozyainov	Yes	Yes	Yes	No
(South Korea) Da-Sol Kim	Yes	No		
(South Korea) Sung-Jae Kim	No			
(Japan) Marie Kiyone	No			
(Israel) Yaron Kohlberg	No			
(Poland) Jacek Kortus	Yes	No		
(Poland) Marcin Koziak	Yes	Yes	No	
(Taiwan) Sheng-Yuan Kwang	No			
(Japan) (United States) Rachel Naomi Kudo	No			
(Russia) Miroslav Kultyshev	Yes	Yes	Yes	No
(Taiwan) Hanchien Lee	No			
(Japan) Eri Mantani	No			
(France) Guillaume Masson	Yes	No		
(Russia) Vladimir Matusevich	No			
(Japan) Maiko Mine	No			
(Japan) Shota Miyazaki	No			
(Japan) Kotaro Nagano	Yes	No		
(Georgia (country)) Mamikon Nakhapetov	No			
(Japan) Mariko Nogami	No			
(Japan) Kana Okada	No			
(Japan) Yuma Osaki	Yes	No		
(Japan) Ainobu Ota	Yes	Yes	No	
(Germany) Anke Pan	No			
(United States) Esther Park	No			
(Israel) Nimrod David Pfeffer	No			
(Spain) Marianna Prjevalskaya	Yes	No		
(Russia) Ilya Rashkovsky	Yes	No		
(Poland) Joanna Różewska	No			
(Japan) Takaya Sano	No			
(Switzerland) Louis Schwizgebel-Wang	No			
(Russia) Yury Shadrin ^{1}	Yes	Yes	No	
(Israel) Ishay Shaer	No			
(Taiwan) Meng-Sheng Shen	No			
(Russia) Natalia Sokolovskaya	No			
(Japan) Rina Sudo	Yes	No		
(South Korea) Hyung-Ming Suh	Yes	No		
(Australia) Hannah Sun	No			
(China) Hiayi Sun	Yes	No		
(United States) Mei-Ting Sun	Yes	Yes	No	
(Poland) Gracjan Szymczak	No			
(China) Xin Tong	Yes	No		
(Russia) Daniil Trifonov	Yes	Yes	Yes	3
(France) Hélène Tysman	Yes	Yes	Yes	No
(United States) Andrew Tyson	Yes	Yes	No	
(Italy) Irene Veneziano	Yes	Yes	No	
(Poland) Paweł Wakarecy	Yes	Yes	Yes	No
(Japan) Yuri Watanabe	Yes	No		
(Austria) Ingolf Wunder	Yes	Yes	Yes	2
(Ukraine) Denis Zhdanov	Yes	No		
(United States) Eric Zuber	No			

^{1} Withdrawal
