= Tebenikhin =

Tebenikhin (Russian: Тебенихин) is a Slavic masculine surname, its feminine counterpart is Tebenikhina. Notable people with the surname include:

- Amir Tebenikhin (born 1977), Kazakhstani pianist
- Irina Tebenikhina (born 1978), Russian volleyball player
