= Stanislav Ioudenitch =

Uzbekistani-born American pianist (born 1971)

- Born: December 5, 1971 (age 54); Tashkent, Uzbek Soviet Socialist Republic (present‍-‍day Uzbekistan)
- Genres: Classical
- Occupation: Pianist
- Instrument: Piano
- Label: Harmonia Mundi

Stanislav Ioudenitch (born December 5, 1971) is an Uzbekistani-born American pianist, internationally recognized after winning a gold medal at the 2001 Van Cliburn International Piano Competition along with the Steven De Groote Memorial Award for Best Performance of Chamber Music. He has also been a prizewinner at the Busoni, Kapell, and Maria Callas competitions, as well as at the Palm Beach Invitational (1998) and the New Orleans International (2000). Following his Cliburn success, Ioudenitch launched an active international career, appearing with major ensembles including the Mariinsky Theatre Orchestra, Russian National Orchestra, the National Symphony Orchestra in Washington, D.C., and the Munich Philharmonic the Rochester Philharmonic, the National Philharmonic of Russia, the Fort Worth Symphony, and the Kansas City Symphony. He has collaborated with prominent conductors such as James Conlon, Valery Gergiev, Mikhail Pletnev, Vladimir Spivakov, Günther Herbig, Michael Stern, and Carl St. Clair, among others. His chamber music partnerships have included performances with the Takács, Prazák, and Borromeo String Quartets, and he was a founding member of the Park Piano Trio.

== Early life and education ==
Born to a family a musicians in Tashkent, Uzbekistan, Ioudenitch started playing the piano at seven. He studied at the Uspensky School of Music in Tashkent with Natalia Vasinkina, the Reina Sofía School of Music in Madrid with Dmitri Bashkirov and Galina Eguiazarova, the International Piano Foundation in Cadenabbia (present day International Piano Academy Lake Como) with Karl Ulrich Schnabel, William Grant Naboré, Murray Perahia, Leon Fleisher, Fou Ts'ong and Rosalyn Tureck, the Cleveland Institute of Music with Sergei Babayan, and the UMKC Conservatory of Music with Robert Weirich.

== Personal life ==
With his wife, Tatiana (also a pianist), Ioudenitch has a daughter, the violinist Maria Ioudenitch.

== Career ==
Ioudenitch's win at the Van Cliburn Competition led to a recital debut at the Aspen Music Festival and a European tour, highlighted by appearances at summer festivals in France, Germany, Italy, and the United Kingdom. He has also performed throughout Asia, and collaborated with a wide range of international conductors including James Conlon, Valery Gergiev, Mikhail Pletnev, Asher Fisch, Vladimir Spivakov, Günther Herbig, Pavel Kogan, James DePreist, Michael Stern, Stefan Sanderling, Carl St. Clair and Justus Franz, and with such orchestras as the National Symphony in Washington DC, the Munich Philharmonic, Mariinsky Orchestra, the Rochester Philharmonic, the National Philharmonic of Russia, the Fort Worth Symphony and the Kansas City Symphony among others. He has also performed with the Takács, Prazák and Borromeo String Quartets and is a founding member of the Park Piano Trio at Park University in Kansas City, Missouri.

Ioudenitch is the youngest pianist ever invited to give master classes at the International Piano Academy at Lake Como, where he serves as vice president. He is currently associate professor of music/piano at Park University and associate professor at the Oberlin Conservatory of Music.

== Awards ==
- Third Place, Busoni International Piano Competition (1991)
- Eleventh Van Cliburn International Piano Competition (2001)
  - Co-winner: Nancy Lee and Perry R. Bass Gold Medal
  - Steven De Groote Memorial Award for Best Performance of Chamber Music

== Discography ==
compact discs
	title	label	date	catalog number	notes
1.	Stanislav Ioudenitch: Gold Medalist, Eleventh Van Cliburn International Piano Competition	Harmonia Mundi	9 October 2001	HMU 907290	
