= Tomoki Sakata =

Japanese pianist

Tomoki Sakata (born 1993 in Nagoya) is a Japanese pianist.

== Life and career ==
Sakata began playing the piano at the age of five. He got lessons from Dmitri Bashkirov, Tamas Vasary and Paul Badura-Skoda.

He studied at the Tokyo University of the Arts and at the Lake Como International Piano Academy. He also studied with Arie Vardi at the Hochschule für Musik, Theater und Medien Hannover where he received his bachelor's and master's degrees.

=== Competitions ===
In 2013, he was one of the six finalists at the Van Cliburn International Piano Competition.

In 2016, he won top prizes at the Franz Liszt International Piano Competition (Budapest).

In 2018, he received the Audience Award at the International German Piano Award.

In 2019, he won the 1st prize and the audience award at the Kissingen Piano Olympics.

In 2021, he was awarded 4th prize at the Queen Elisabeth Competition in Brussels.

=== Festivals ===
Sakata has performed in concert halls such as Leipzig Gewandhaus, Hamburg Elbphilharmonie, and Tokyo Suntory Hall, and has appeared at numerous festivals, including the Verbier Festival (Switzerland), the "Janáčkův Máj" Music Festival in Ostrava (Czech Republic), the Brussels Piano Festival (Belgium).
