= Yona Ettlinger =

German clarinetist (1924–1981)

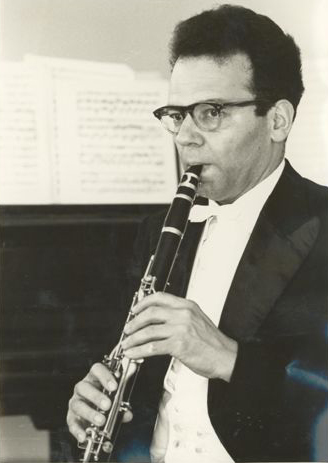
Yona Ettlinger

Yona Ettlinger (May 28, 1924 – June 24, 1981) was a clarinetist who played and taught in Israel, France and England. Ettlinger is considered a prominent classical clarinetist of his generation, and one of Israel's notable instrumentalists. His musicianship and unique sound influenced the art of clarinet playing in Israel and Europe in the second half of the 20th century. Many clarinet soloists and orchestra players of different countries were among his students.

== Life ==
Ettlinger was born in 1924 in Munich, Germany, and immigrated with his family to Palestine in 1933. The family lived in Tel Aviv, where Ettlinger studied piano, and later on the clarinet. His main clarinet teacher was Tzvi Tsipin. Ettlinger continued his studies in the United States and France, where he studied with the clarinetist Louis Cahuzac. His composition teacher was the Israeli composer Paul Ben-Haim.

Between 1947 and 1964, Ettlinger was first clarinetist with the Israel Philharmonic Orchestra, and played under conductors Zubin Mehta, Sergiu Celibidache, and Paul Paray among others. Ettlinger took part in forming some of Israel's leading chamber ensembles, including the Tel Aviv Quartet, with which he performed and recorded until his death. With the Tel Aviv Quartet and with pianist Pnina Salzman, Ettlinger performed in some of the major festivals and cultural centers in the United States, South America, Europe, Australia and the Far East. He also appeared as conductor with the Israel Chamber Orchestra and the Jerusalem Symphony Orchestra. Some of the prominent Israeli composers in his time wrote pieces for him, including the composers Tzvi Avni, Ben-Zion Orgad, Mordechai Seter and Josef Tal.

In 1964, Ettlinger moved to Paris, where he taught clarinet and studied composition with the compositor and conductor Nadia Boulanger. In 1966, he joined the Guildhall School of Music and Drama in London as a professor of clarinet and conductor of the school's symphony orchestra.

Yona Ettlinger died suddenly in London in 1981 of heart disease at the age of 57.

== Recordings ==
Second movement (excerpt) from Brahms' Clarinet Quintet op. 115: Yona Ettlinger (Clarinet) and Tel Aviv Quartet, from a Sony Editions 3 CD

During his lifetime, records by Ettlinger appeared with Decca, RCA and Harmonia Mundi. In addition, many of his concerts were recorded by Kol Yisrael, Israel's radio service. One of Ettlinger's most acclaimed recordings is his performance of Brahms's Clarinet Quintet together with the Tel Aviv Quartet, which appeared in the 1960s on a Decca record, and is considered one of the outstanding recorded interpretations of this piece. The recording was reissued in the 1980s as a Sony CD for limited distribution. This CD also featured another recording by Ettlinger and the Tel Aviv Quartet, of Mozart's Clarinet Quintet.

=== Records ===
- BRAHMS, Clarinet Quintet in B minor, Op. 115. Yona Ettlinger (clarinet), Tel Aviv Quartet (Chaim Taub, Menahem Breuer, violins; Daniel Benyamini, viola; Uzi Wiesel, cello). Decca, L'Oiseau-Lyre OLS-R146. Recorded in London, 1962.
- MOZART, Clarinet Quintet in A, K.581 / Quartet Nº21 in D, K.575. Yona Ettlinger (clarinet), Tel Aviv Quartet (Chaim Taub, Yefim Boyko, violins; Daniel Benyamini, viola; Uzi Wiesel, cello). RCA RL-37003. Recorded in London, 1976.
- BRAHMS, The Two Sonatas for Clarinet and Piano, Op. 120. Yona Ettlinger (clarinet), Pnina Salzman (piano). RCA FRL1-0131. Recorded in Jerusalem, 1975.

=== CDs ===
- MOZART, Clarinet Quintet in A, K.581. BRAHMS, Clarinet Quintet in B minor, Op. 115. Yona Ettlinger (clarinet), Tel Aviv Quartet (the 1962 and 1976 recordings). Sony-Edition 3. Issued 1988 and reprinted 1998, both prints in limited distributions.
- PNINA SALZMAN Vol. 2, BRAHMS: Trio for Piano, Clarinet and Cello in A minor Op. 114, Sonata for Clarinet and Piano in F minor Op. 120 No. 1, Sonata for Clarinet and Piano in E♭ major Op. 120 No. 2. Yona Ettlinger (clarinet), Pnina Salzman (piano), Uzi Wiesel (cello). Recorded live, Jerusalem, 1975. Doremi Records, DHR-7830.
- PNINA SALZMAN Vol. 6, MOZART: Trio for Clarinet, Viola and Piano in E♭ major, K. 498. Yona Ettlinger (clarinet), Daniel Benjamini (viola), Pnina Salzman (piano). Recorded live, Tel Aviv, 1975. Doremi Records, DHR-7870/1 (2 CDs including other pieces by Mozart, Bach, Liszt and De Falla).
- PNINA SALZMAN Vol. 7, SCHUMANN, Three Romances for Clarinet and Piano Op. 94. BEETHOVEN, Trio for Clarinet, Cello and Piano in B♭ major, Op. 11. C.P.E. BACH, 4 Sonatas for Clarinet, Piano and Cello from Wq.92: Allegretto, Allegro, Andante, Allegro di molto. GLINKA, Trio for Clarinet, Cello and Piano in D minor. POULENC, Sonata for Clarinet and Piano (2 versions). RAMEAU-ETTLINGER, Suite for Clarinet and Piano. Yona Ettlinger (clarinet), Pnina Salzman (piano), Uzi Wiesel (cello). Doremi Records, DHR-7883-7 (5 CDs including other pieces by Schumann, Debussy and others).
- YONA ETTLINGER - CLARINET CONCERTOS: MOZART, Clarinet Concerto in A major, K.622. Carl STAMITZ, Clarinet Concerto No.3 in B♭ major. HANDEL-ETTLINGER, Clarinet Concerto in G minor. J. C. BACH-ETTLINGER: Clarinet Concerto in D major. Yona Ettlinger (clarinet), Israel Chamber Orchestra, Gary Bertini – conductor, Israel Radio Orchestra, Mendi Rodan – conductor. Doremi Records, DHR-7859.

== Arrangements for the Clarinet ==
In addition to his career as soloist, orchestra player, conductor and teacher, Ettlinger added to the clarinet literature a couple of important arrangements from the Baroque and the early Classical period.

- Bach, Johann Christian and Wolfgang Amadeus Mozart. Concerto in E-flat Major for Clarinet and Strings, arr. Yona Ettlinger. Boosey & Hawkes, London, 1974.
- Mozart, Wolfgang Amadeus. Four Church Sonatas for Clarinet and Piano, arr. by Yona Ettlinger. Boosey & Hawkes, London, 1978.
- Mozart, Wolfgang Amadeus. Tema Con Variazioni and Rondo, from Serenade for 13 Wind Instruments (Gran Partita) K.361. Broekmans & Van Poppel, Amsterdam.
- Rameau, Jean Philippe. Suite, arr. Yona Ettlinger. Boosey & Hawkes, London, 1968.
- Rossini, Gioacchino, Sonata No. 3, arr. Yona Ettlinger. Boosey & Hawkes, London, 1982.
- Pre-Classical Encores for Clarinet, Piano and Cello or Bassoon Continuo. A selection of pieces by J.S. Bach, J.C. Bach, Scarlatti, Pergolesi, Rameau, Sammartini, Senaille, Veracini, Fiorillo. arr. by Yona Ettlinger. Edition Peters, New York, 1984.

Additional arrangements by Ettlinger for concerti by Pergolesi, Handel and Veracini are performed by Ettlinger's many followers, but have not appeared in print.
