= Peace Philharmonic Orchestra =

Swiss Orchestra

- Orchestra
- Native name: Orchestre Philharmonique de la Paix
- Founded: 2024; 2 years ago
- Location: Geneva, Switzerland
- Concert hall: Victoria Hall
- Music director: Nikolay Khozyainov
- Website: peacephilharmonic.org/fr

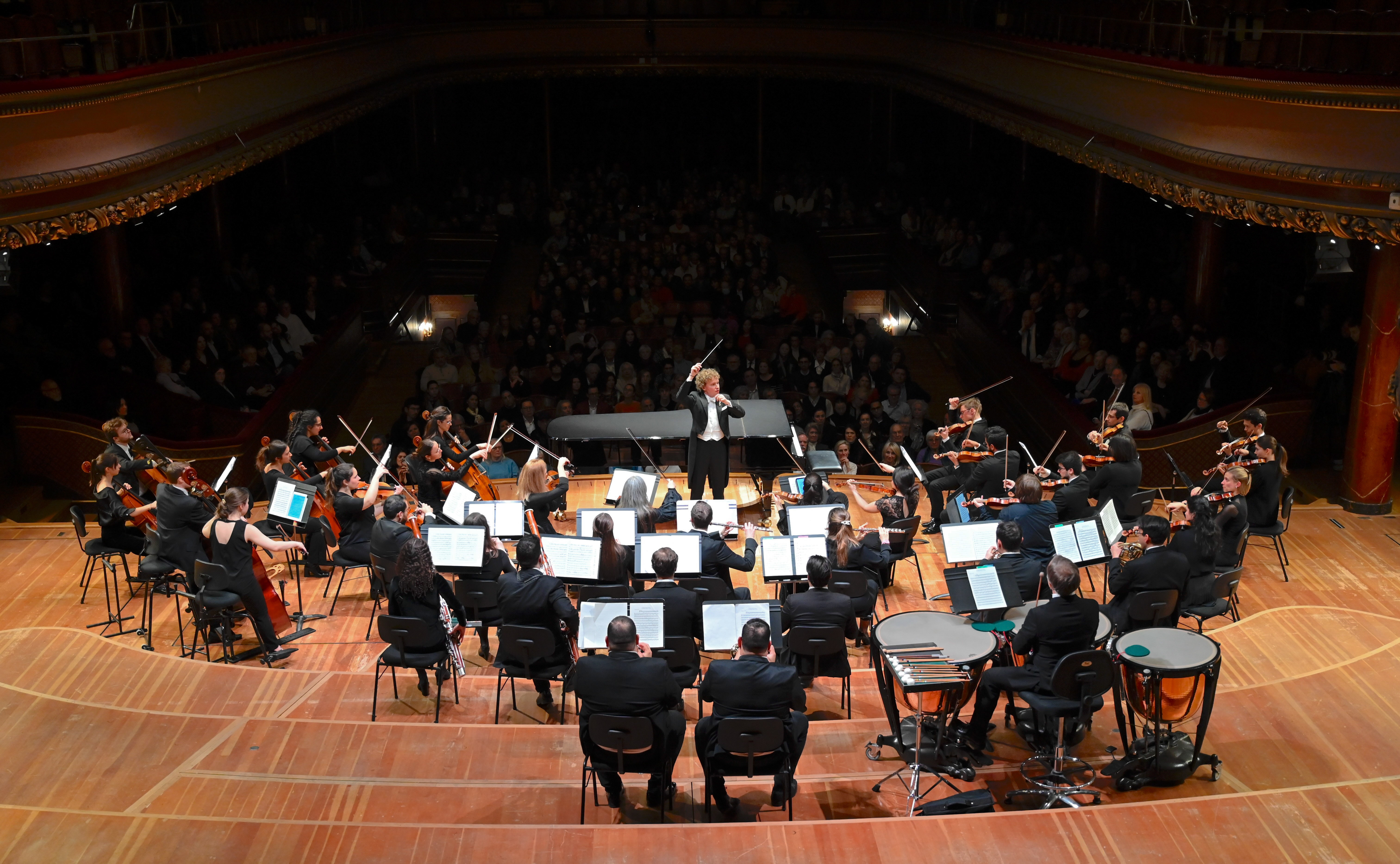
Peace Philharmonic Orchestra, Victoria Hall

The Peace Philharmonic Orchestra is a symphony orchestra based in Geneva, Switzerland. Founded in 2024 by pianist, composer and conductor Nikolay Khozyainov.

== History ==
The orchestra had its inaugural concert on January 30, 2025, at the Victoria Hall in Geneva, performing works by Mozart and Schubert. The program included the Overture from The Marriage of Figaro, Mozart's Piano Concerto No. 21, and Schubert's Unfinished Symphony. The orchestra was conducted by its founder, Nikolay Khozyainov, who also performed as soloist.

The launch of the Peace Philharmonic Orchestra was announced by Nikolay Khozyainov in numerous media interviews, including live interviews on TV5 Monde in Paris, RTS (Swiss National broadcaster), and Léman Bleu TV in Geneva.

== Concerts and public reception ==
The inaugural performance took place on January 30, 2025, at the Victoria Hall in Geneva, followed by the Spring Concert on April 11, 2025, at the same venue. The Spring concert featured Mozart's Overture from Apollo et Hyacinthus, K. 38, the Clarinet Concerto in A major, K. 622, as well as Haydn's Farewell Symphony, Hob. I:45, with Khozyainov conducting.

Victor Hache, music critic, wrote: "A symphony for peace, conducted by the Russian prodigy Nikolay Khozyainov, captivated the Victoria Hall in Geneva. At the podium and at the piano, a rare talent: Nikolay Khozyainov. At just thirty-two years old, this young Russian pianist and conductor has infused a new intensity into the works of Schubert and Mozart."

In an interview with L’Agenda, Adrien Philipp, principal clarinetist of the Peace Philharmonic Orchestra, described the orchestra's "personality" as youthful, enthusiastic, and eager to excel. He noted that the working atmosphere is ideal, contrasting it with his experiences in other orchestras where long-term members can sometimes lead to a sense of fatigue. During the inaugural concert in January 2025, Philipp observed that everyone was highly engaged, drawn not only by the uniqueness of the project but also by Nikolay Khozyainov's innovative musical interpretations.

== Venue ==
Victoria Hall in Geneva is a historic concert hall known for its exceptional acoustics and architecture. It is a central hub for music and culture in Geneva. Opened in 1894, it serves as a major venue for classical music concerts, contributing to the city's rich cultural scene.

It is the primary venue for the Orchestre de la Suisse Romande, one of Switzerland's leading orchestras.

== Vision ==
The Peace Philharmonic Orchestra was established in Geneva, known as the "city of peace", home to many international institutions, to create a platform for musicians from diverse cultural and religious backgrounds, particularly from conflict-affected countries, to come together and unite through music. Khozyainov says : "At our inaugural concert, we had Russian, American, Ukrainian musicians, and many others - all performing together in harmony. Music has that unique ability. It can unite people regardless of background, language, or political situation."

== See also ==
- Music and politics
- Cultural Diplomacy
