= Yossi Reshef =

Yossi Reshef (Hebrew: יוסי רשף; born April 26, 1973, in Jaffa, Israel) is a concert pianist, teacher and conductor. He has lived in Berlin, Germany, since 2010. He is the founder and artistic director of the Berliner Klavierfesttage and his recordings and performances have received worldwide recognition and attention. Reshef's musical focus is on the compositions of Beethoven, Dvořák, Brahms, Schumann and Liszt.

== Education ==
Reshef studied with Pnina Salzman (a pupil of Alfred Cortot and Arthur Rubinstein) at the Tel Aviv University of Music, after which he completed his doctorate at the University of Southern California in Los Angeles. During this time he was appointed personal teaching assistant to his professor Norman Krieger. In addition to his piano studies, Reshef received training in conducting from John Barnett, Hans Beer and Kenneth Kiesler.

== Career ==
Reshef is active as a soloist, chamber musician, conductor and teacher. Solo concerts, chamber music, orchestral tours and festivals have taken him throughout Europe, Asia[2], the United States and Africa[3] during his career as a pianist. Yossi Reshef is the founder and artistic director of the “Klavier am Rhein Festival” and the Berliner Klavierfesttage, which annually invites renowned artists from all over the world to give concerts, master classes and performances in Berlin's most prestigious concert halls, such as the Berliner Philharmonie, the Konzerthaus Berlin and the Berlin University of the Arts (UdK).

Reshef has performed in some of the most prestigious concert halls such as Carnegie Hall in NY and has worked with numerous orchestras including the Philippine Philharmonic Orchestra, the Bath Philharmonia (UK), the Symphony Orchestra of India and the Azerbaijan State Symphony Orchestra.

== Pedagogical work ==
Following his doctorate, Reshef became professor of chamber music at the Apple Hill Center for Chamber Music and was appointed visiting professor of piano at the University of Puget Sound in Tacoma, Washington. In 2010, Yossi Reshef opened his own studio in Berlin, where he has worked with numerous young pianists in recent years and prepared them for international competitions. Reshef is an active faculty member of the Musicfest Perugia, the Yablonsky Music Institute and the Tel-Hai International Piano Masterclasses and regularly sits on the juries of well-known piano competitions. In the past, numerous masterclasses have taken Yossi Reshef to renowned institutions such as the Gnessin Conservatory in Moscow, the Academy of Music, Łódź in Poland, the Berlin University of the Arts, the South African College of Music and many other leading music institutions worldwide.

== Musical interpretation and research ==
Reshef attaches great importance to attaching the utmost importance to every detail of the score in order to develop a profound understanding of the structure, the technical subtleties, the multi-faceted sound world and the characteristic expression of a work. In recent years, he has devoted himself intensively to the compositions of Schumann, Dvorak, Brahms, Liszt and Beethoven, as well as modern music. He is firmly convinced that a comprehensive understanding of many of a composer's works is the key to interpreting their music. In his own publications and articles, such as “Teaching piano and how we perceive the instrument”, Reshef provides insights into his views and approach to music and pedagogy. A recent part of Reshef's work is the examination of artificial intelligence in music, to which a special theme day will be dedicated in the 2026 edition of the Berliner Klavierfesttage.

== Awards and scholarships ==
Reshef has received numerous international awards, including:

- America Israel Cultural Foundation Excellency Prize
- Zilbermann Prize for the best interpretation of Israeli piano music
- Rubin Academy Competition (2nd prize)
- Apple Hill: Piano for Peace Prize
- John Green Endowed Scholarship
- Ann and Gordon Getty Scholarship
- Dean's Excellency Award for Achievements in Music Studies
- John Tesh Scholar
- Alice Ray Catalyne Music Scholarship in Piano
- David Nowakowsky Music Scholarship
- Michael Feinstein Music Scholarship
- Full Tuition Dean's Scholarship
- Academic Achievement Award
- Pi Kappa Lambda, Initiation
- Adele Marcus Foundation Music Scholarship

== Discography ==
- Album: Schumann, Chopin & Beethoven
- Album: Four Paintings by Leestemaker, Three Scenes of Childhood (Vincent Ho, Skylark Press)
- Album: Concerto pour Percussions et Deux Pianos (Ami Maayani, FONS-IMP)
- Single: Yossi Reshef plays Dvorak: Poetic Tone Pictures Op. 85 I - Twilight Way
- Single: Yossi Reshef plays Liszt: Paganini Etude No. 2
- Article: „Teaching piano and how we perceive the instrument“
- Film: “Yossi” (ein kurzer Dokumentarfilm von Andrew W. Chan) 2006 “Without Paris”
- Film: 2008 “Ivory”
- Film: 2010 „Komponist“
