= Miroslav Kultyshev =

Miroslav Kultyshev Мирослав Винаевич Култышев
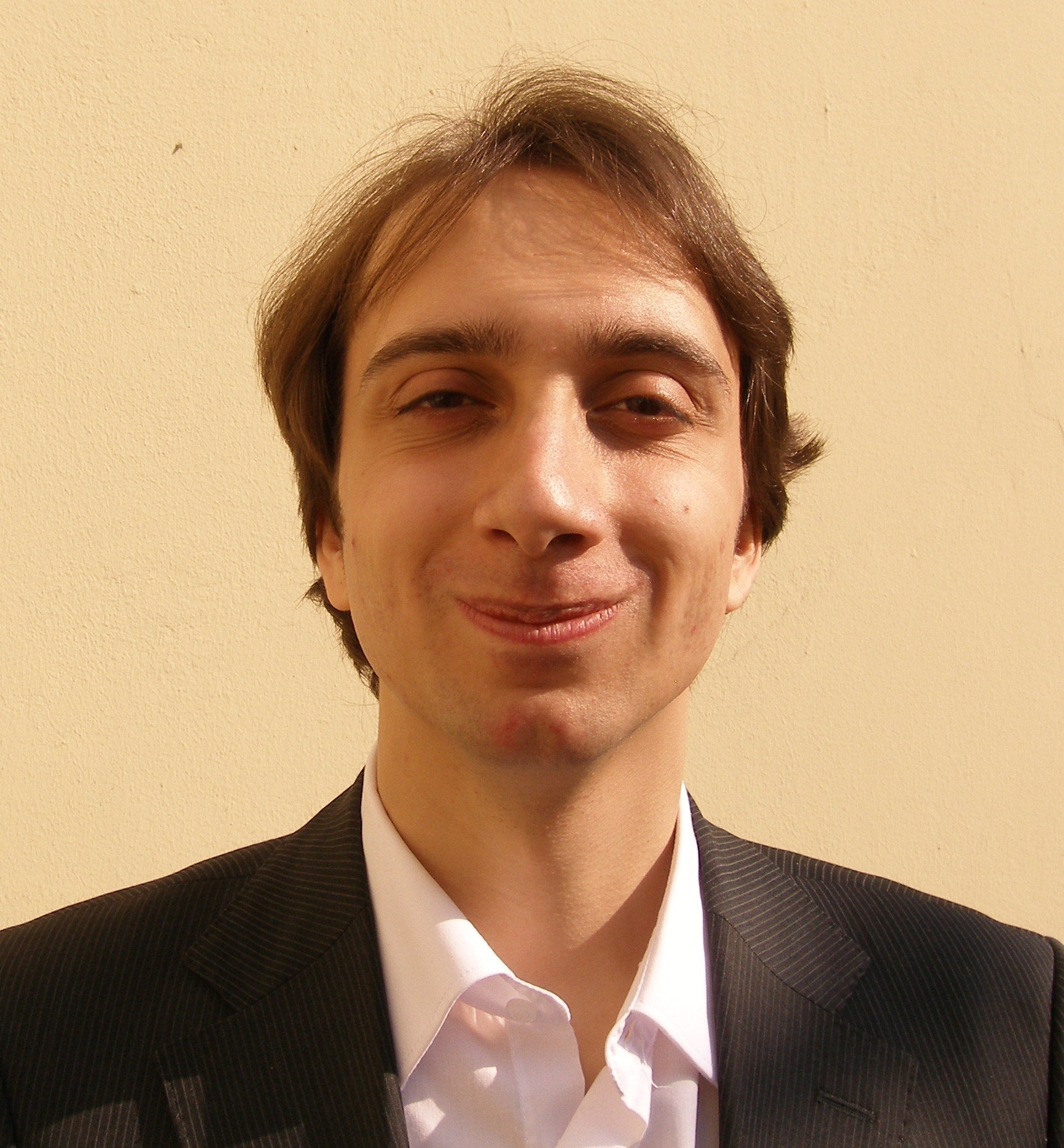
- Portrait of Miroslav Kultyshev

Background information
- Born: 21 August 1985 (age 39); Leningrad, Soviet Union
- Genres: Classical
- Occupation: Pianist
- Instruments: Piano

Miroslav Kultyshev (born August 21, 1985) is a Russian classical pianist and was awarded second prize at the 2007 International Tchaikovsky Competition (no first prize was awarded).

== Biography ==
=== Early life and education ===
Kultyshev was born in Saint Petersburg, Russia (then Leningrad, Soviet Union), on August 21, 1985. He gave his first concert at age six, and at age ten, he appeared in the Grand Hall of the St. Petersburg Philharmonic, performing Mozart's D minor Concerto No. 20, K466 under the direction of Yuri Temirkanov.

In 2004, Kultyshev graduated from the Secondary Specialized Musical School of the St. Petersburg State Conservatory, where he studied under Zora Zucker.

He is currently a student at the St. Petersburg Conservatory, where he studies with Alexander Sandler.

=== Career ===
In 1996, he made his debut with the Saint Petersburg Philharmonic Orchestra.

Since 2006, he has been a scholar and active participant of the St. Petersburg House of Music. He tours in Austria, Germany, France, Italy, Great Britain, the United States, the Netherlands, Czech Republic, Slovakia, Lithuania, United Arab Emirates, and Ukraine.

From 2006 until 2007, he took part in an internship at the International Holland Music Sessions.

In 2007, he won the 13th International Tchaikovsky Competition in Moscow, Russia, being awarded second prize - no first prize was awarded that year.

He has released an album which includes his performance of all twelve of Franz Liszt's Études d'exécution transcendante. He holds scholarships from the Yuri Bashmet Foundation and the St. Petersburg Philharmonic Society. He regularly tours with the conductor Valery Gergiev. He has also worked with conductors Vladimir Ashkenazy, Constantine Orbelian, Yuri Bashmet, and Vassily Sinaisky.

== Awards ==
- 1998: G. Neuhaus International Festival
- 1999: International Music Festival “Virtuosos of 2000”
- 2001: grant-holder of the National Youth Prize “Triumph”.
- 2005: First prize and Golden Medal of the International Youth Delphic Games (Ukraine, Kiev)
- 2007: silver medal, 13th International Tchaikovsky Competition
- 2010: Distinction in XVI International Chopin Piano Competition
- 2012: Monte Carlo Piano Masters
