= Magdalene Ho =

Malaysian classical pianist

- Born: 2003 (age 22–23); California, U.S.
- Education: Royal College of Music
- Occupation: Classical pianist
- Known for: Clara Haskil International Piano Competition (2023); International German Piano Award (2024); Van Cliburn International Piano Competition (2025)

Magdalene Ho (born 2003) is an Malaysian classical pianist. She gained international recognition after winning the Clara Haskil International Piano Competition in 2023 and the International German Piano Award in 2024.

== Early life and education ==
Ho was born in 2003 in California to Malaysian parents. She began piano studies at an early age and later moved to the United Kingdom in 2013, where she studied at the Purcell School for Young Musicians on a scholarship.

Ho has appeared as a soloist with orchestras including the Orchestre de la Suisse Romande. She has also performed chamber music with musicians including Daniel Müller-Schott and Marc Coppey.

Since 2022, she has been a student at the Royal College of Music in London under Dmitri Alexeev.

== Career ==
In 2023, Ho won the Clara Haskil International Piano Competition in Vevey, Switzerland. She also received the Audience Prize, Young Critics’ Prize, and Children’s Corner Prize. Her performance was noted for clarity, structural awareness, and tonal refinement. The win led to concert engagements across Europe.

In 2024, Ho won the International German Piano Award in Kronberg, Germany, becoming the first woman to receive the prize.

In May 2025 she participated in the 2025 Van Cliburn International Piano Competition in Fort Worth, Texas. She performed in the preliminary round but did not advance to the semifinal stage.

In September 2025, she gave three recitals at the Bechstein Centres in Cologne, Düsseldorf and Hamburg as part of events honouring Alfred Brendel.

In February 2026, she appeared in the Série jeunes recital series at the Tonhalle Zürich.

In July 2026, Ho returned to Malaysia to participate in TalentCorp’s Malaysia@Heart (MyHeart) programme. She led a lecture‑recital titled In Conversation with Magdalene Ho, held at Universiti Teknologi MARA and the UCSI Institute of Music, where she engaged with students, educators and musicians on performance practice and career development. During the same visit, she performed in Magdalene Ho & Friends: Piano & Chamber Recital, presenting works by Brahms and Schubert with violinist Alyssa Chong and cellist Sinjo Yap.

Ho is pursuing a Bachelor of Music at the Royal College of Music in London on a full scholarship.

== Reception ==
Critics have described Ho’s playing as expressive, structurally clear, and technically refined.

Her interpretations have been noted for musical sensitivity and clarity of phrasing.

== Awards ==
- ABRSM Sheila Mossman Prize and Silver Award - (2015)
- Düsseldorf Schumann Competition - 1st Prize (2023)
- RCM Joan Chissell Schumann Prize for Piano at the Royal College of Music - 1st Prize (2023)
- Clara Haskil Piano Competition – 1st Prize (2023)
- International German Piano Award – Winner (2024)
- RMC Chappell Gold Medal - Winner (2024)

== Sources ==
- Bechstein (2024). "Magdalene Ho artist profile". C. Bechstein.
- Bechstein (23 September 2025). "Gedenkkonzert – In Memoriam Alfred Brendel (1931–2025)". C. Bechstein Centrum Köln (in German). C. Bechstein Pianoforte AG.
- Bellamy, Olivier (6 September 2023). "Piano : une Malaisienne sur les pas de Clara Haskil". Le Point (in French).
- Boissard, Bertrand (4 September 2023). "Concours Clara Haskil : le piano généreux de Magdalene Ho". Diapason (in French).
- Cati, Irem (25 November 2024). "Gemeinsames Musizieren übertrifft virtuoses Selbstbewusstsein". Frankfurter Allgemeine Zeitung (in German).
- International Piano Forum Frankfurt (2024). "International German Piano Award | Winners 2024". ipf-frankfurt.com.
- Oleh PR NEWSWIRE (22 July 2026). "Internationally Acclaimed Malaysian Pianist Magdalene Ho Inspires Next Generation Through TalentCorp's MyHeart Initiative". Kosmo Digital. Kosmo.
- ResMusica (2 September 2023). "Magdalene Ho remporte le Prix Clara Haskil". ResMusica (in French).
- Rondo Production (19 July 2026). "Magdalene Ho & Friends: Piano & Chamber Recital". Rondo Production. The Rondo Production (M) Sdn Bhd.
- The Cliburn (2025). "2025 Cliburn competitors". Van Cliburn Foundation.
- Tonhalle-Orchester Zürich (20 January 2026). "In the footsteps of Clara Haskil". Tonhalle-Orchester Zürich.
- Tonhalle Zürich (February 2026). "Série jeunes: Magdalene Ho". Tonhalle-Gesellschaft Zürich. Tonhalle Zürich.
- Verbier Festival (2024). "Magdalene Ho biography" (in French). Verbier Festival.
