= Jan Stanienda =

Polish violinist (1953–2021)

- Born: 22 January 1953; Poland
- Died: 22 September 2021 (aged 68)
- Education: Chopin Academy of Music
- Occupations: Violinist; Chamber musician; Concertmaster
- Organizations: Polish Chamber Orchestra; Sinfonia Varsovia; Leopoldinum Chamber Orchestra
- Awards: Paganini Competition

Jan Stanienda (22 January 1953 – 22 September 2021) was a Polish violinist, chamber musician and concertmaster.

== Biography ==
Stanienda was a graduate of the Chopin Academy of Music in Warsaw, where he studied with Krzysztof Jakowicz. Since 1975, Jan Stanienda had been a member of the Polish Chamber Orchestra under Jerzy Maksymiuk, and in 1977 he became its concertmaster and soloist. In 1976 he received a prize at the Niccolo Paganini International Violin Competition in Genoa.

He performed with many distinguished musicians, such as Yehudi Menuhin, Maurice André, Michala Petri, Wanda Wiłkomirska, Krzysztof Jakowicz, János Starker, Barbara Hendricks, Maurice Bourge, Lidia Grzanka-Urbaniak, Guy Touvron, Andrei Gridchuk, Grzegorz Nowak, Tadeusz Wojciechowski and Krzysztof Jabłoński.

He was the concertmaster of Sinfonia Varsovia in 1986–1990. He was the artistic director of the Leopoldinum Chamber Orchestra in 1992–1995 and the artistic director of the Wratislavia Chamber Orchestra since 1996. He was the creator and artistic director of the Wrocław Chamber Music Festival Arsenal Nights and the laureate of the Wrocław Music Award (2006). He was also the artistic director of the European Musical Workshops and the Summer Orchestral Workshops in Kołobrzeg.

He performed both as soloist and conductor in every European country and on every continent. He gave concerts at Carnegie Hall in New York City, Berliner Philharmonie, Amsterdam Concertgebouw, Auditorio Nacional de Música in Madrid, Barbican Centre and Royal Albert Hall in London (BBC Proms), Santa Cecilia in Rome and many others.

He died at age 68.
