= Pnina Salzman =

Israeli pianist (1922–2006)

Pnina Salzman פנינה זלצמן
- Born: 24 February 1922; Tel Aviv, Mandatory Palestine
- Died: 16 December 2006 (aged 84) Tel Aviv, Israel
- Genre: Classical
- Occupations: Classical pianist; Piano pedagogue
- Instrument: Piano
- Awards: Israel Prize (2006)

Pnina Salzman (Hebrew: פנינה זלצמן; February 24, 1922, in Tel Aviv, Mandate Palestine – December 16, 2006, in Tel Aviv, Israel) was an Israeli classical pianist and piano pedagogue.

Salzman showed an early aptitude for the piano and gave her first recital at the age of eight. The French pianist and teacher, Alfred Cortot, heard her play in 1932 while she was a student at Shulamit Conservatory and invited her to Paris to study. She graduated at the Ecole Normale de Musique then became a pupil of Magda Tagliaferro at the Conservatoire de Paris, where she was to win the Premier Prix de Piano in 1938, aged 16.

It was through the violinist Bronislaw Huberman that she first developed a lifelong association with the Israel Philharmonic Orchestra, which Huberman had founded. In this context, she premiered at least two Israeli works for piano and orchestra - Marc Lavry's Piano Concerto No. 1 and Paul Ben Haim Capriccio Op. 60 - as well as performing Ben Haim's Piano Concerto, Op. 41, and other works.

In 1963 she became the first Israeli to be invited to play in the USSR and in 1994, the first Israeli pianist invited to play in China. Besides performing as a soloist, she appeared frequently as a chamber musician -- among other things, as a member of the Israel Piano Quartet. In partnership with clarinettist Yona Ettlinger, she premiered Mordecai Seter's Monodrama (1970); she also premiered Seter's Soliloquio for solo piano (1972).

She was a Professor and the head of the piano department at Tel Aviv University and served on the jury of many piano competitions, including the Arthur Rubinstein, Vladimir Horowitz, Marguerite Long and Paloma O'Shea Santander International Piano Competition. She taught piano to many students, including Dror Elimelech, Nimrod David Pfeffer, Elisha Abas, Inbar Rothschild, Iddo Bar-Shai and Yossi Reshef.

== Awards ==
In 2006, Salzman was awarded the Israel Prize for music.

== See also ==
- List of Israel Prize recipients
