= Nikolay Khozyainov =

Russian classical pianist (born 1992)

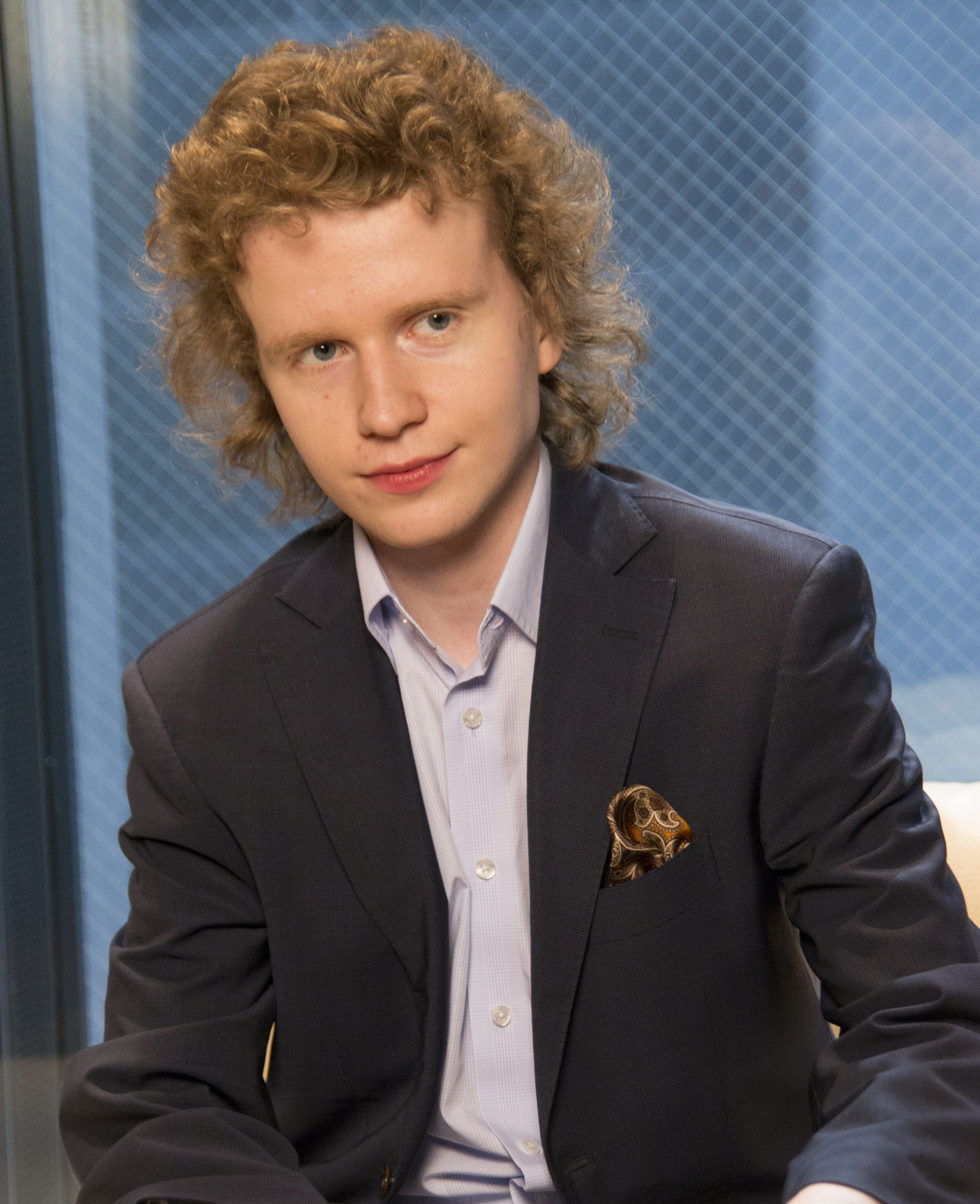

Background information
- Born: 17 July 1992 (age 34)
- Origin: Blagoveschensk, Amur Oblast, Russia
- Occupation: Pianist
- Years active: 1999–present
- Website: www.nikolaykhozyainov.com

Nikolay Khozyainov (Russian: Николай Юрьевич Хозяинов; born 17 July 1992) is a Russian classical pianist, composer, and conductor. He is noted for what music critic Anthony Tommasini describes as "stunning virtuosity".

== Youth and education ==
Nikolay Khozyainov was born in Blagoveshchensk on 17 July 1992. He began to play the piano at the age of five and continued his studies in Moscow at the Central Musical School of the Moscow Conservatory. At the age of seven he made his debut with the Handel Piano Concerto at the Great Hall of the Moscow Conservatory. At the present time he is pursuing an Advanced Degree at the Hannover Hochschule fur Musik under the guidance of Professor Arie Vardi.

== Performances ==
Highlights of Nikolay Khozyainov's recital and concerto engagements include concerts at Carnegie Hall, London's Wigmore Hall, Lincoln Center, Kennedy Center in Washington, Salle Gaveau, Theatre de Champs-Élysées in Paris, Tchaikovsky Hall in Moscow, Tokyo's Suntory Hall, Louvre, Zurich Tonhalle.

In January 2018, the Emperor Akihito and Empress Michiko of Japan came to Nikolay's concert in Tokyo's Suntory Hall.

He has performed with the Philharmonia Orchestra, Tokyo Symphony Orchestra, Sydney Symphony Orchestra, Warsaw Philharmonic Orchestra, Czech National Symphony Orchestra, Russian State Orchestra, The Yomiuri Nippon Symphony Orchestra, RTE National Symphony Orchestra of Ireland and other.

In 2024, Nikolay Khozyainov founded the Peace Philharmonic Orchestra, based in Geneva. The orchestra had its inaugural concert on January 30, 2025, at Victoria Hall, where Khozyainov conducted and performed as a soloist.

== Discography ==
Album title	Label	Program
The Blue Series- Nikolay Khozyainov	The Fryderyk Chopin Institute	Fryderkyk Chopin: Nocturne in B major, Op. 9 No. 3; Etude in C major, Op. 10 No. 1; Etude in A minor, Op. 10 No. 2; Fantasy in F minor, Op. 49; Ballade in F major, Op. 38; Prelude in C sharp minor, Op. 45; Scherzo in E major, Op. 54; Sonata in B flat minor, Op. 35
Nikolay Khozyainov: Piano Recital	CD Accord	Fryderyk Chopin: Nocturne No. 3 in B Major, Op. 9, No. 3; Bolero, Op. 19; Piano Sonata No. 2 in B-Flat Minor, Op. 35; Franz Liszt: Apres une lecture du Dante, fantasia quasi una sonata; Fantasie uber zwei Motive aus W.A. Mozarts Die Hochzeit des Figaro
Nikolay Khozyainov – My Favourites	Victor Entertainment	Ludwig van Beethoven: Piano Sonata No.31 in A flat major, op. 110; Franz Schubert: Fantasy in C major, D.760 (op.15), "Wanderer Fantasy"; Fryderyk Chopin: Scherzo in E major, op. 54; Ballade in F major, op.38; Franz Liszt: Etudes d'execution transcendentante "Feux Follets", S.139-5; Mephisto Waltz no.1 (Dance at the Village Inn), S.514
Nikolay Khozyainov – Maurice Ravel, Fryderyk Chopin, Franz Liszt	Victor Entertainment	Maurice Ravel: Pavanne pour une infante defunte; Gaspard de la nuit; Fryderyk Chopin: Barcarolle in F sharp major, op.60; Berceuse in D flat major, op.57; Franz Liszt: Piano Sonata in B minor, S.178

== Achievements and awards ==
His growing list of awards and achievements includes:

- Finalist of the XVI International Chopin Piano Competition in Warsaw, Poland
- 1st prize at 2003 Virtuosi per musica di pianoforte in Czech Republic
- 1st prize at the IX International Carl Filtsch Piano Competition in Romania
- 2nd prize at the VI Moscow International Frederic Chopin Piano Competition for young pianists
- 1st prize at the 2012 Dublin International Piano Competition
- 2nd prize at the 2012 Sydney International Piano Competition
  - Special Prizes for:
    - Audience Prize
    - Best Performance of Both Concertos Voted by Members of the Sydney Symphony Orchestra
    - Best Performance of a Work by Liszt
    - Best Performance of a Work by Schubert
    - Best Performance of a Virtuoso Study
    - Youngest Finalist
