= Petras Geniušas =

Lithuanian musician

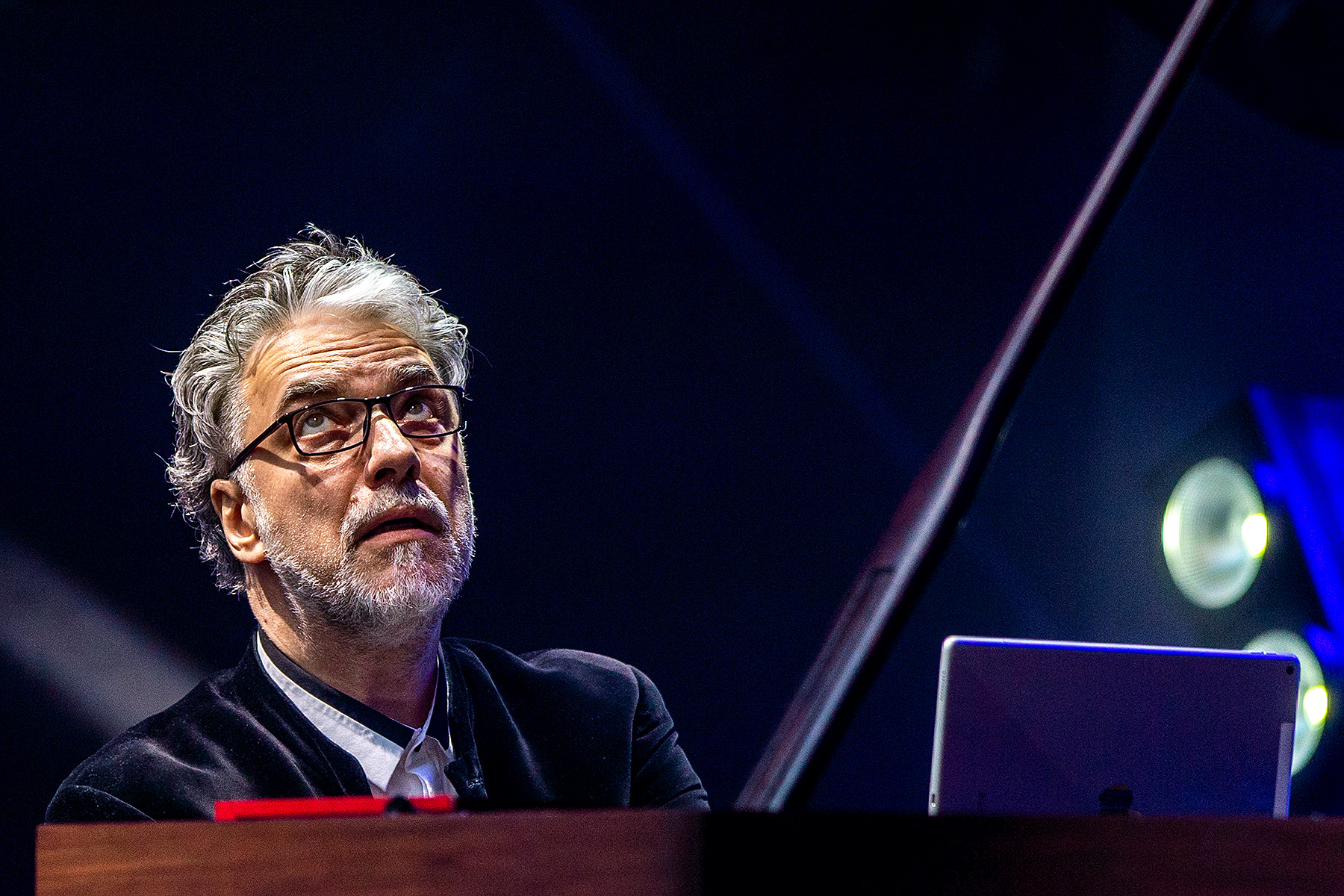
- Born: 1961 (age 64–65); Vilnius, Lithuania
- Occupation: Pianist
- Awards: Lithuanian National Prize

Petras Geniušas (born 1961 in Vilnius) is a Lithuanian classical pianist.

During his career he has worked with composers Alfred Schnittke, Bronius Kutavičius, Osvaldas Balakauskas and Leonid Desyatnikov, some of whom have dedicated several of their compositions to him.

Geniushas' career as a teacher has included master classes in Tokyo and Osaka, the Swedish-Baltic master classes Academia Baltica, and the Royal Academy of Music in London. He has permanent teaching positions at the Lithuanian Academy of Music and Theatre, and the Yamaha Music Foundation's primary music school in Tokyo.

For his wide-ranging musical accomplishments, Geniušas has been awarded the Lithuanian National Prize.

His son is the pianist Lukas Geniušas.
