= Hélène Tysman =

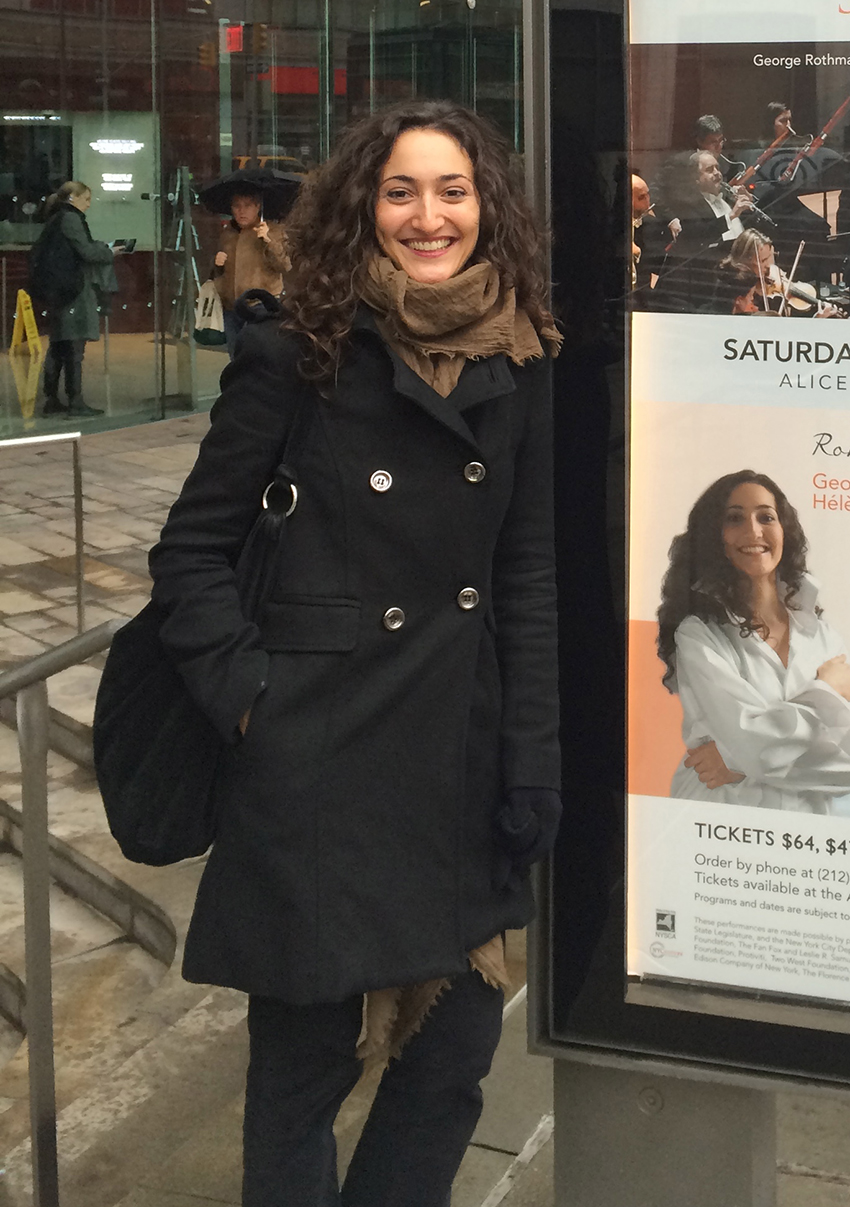

Background information
- Born: Hélène Tysman; 30 December 1982 (age 43); Paris, France

Hélène Tysman (born 30 December 1982, Paris, France) is a prizewinning French classical pianist. She studied at the Paris Conservatoire under Pierre-Laurent Aimard and later with Oleg Maisenberg in Vienna. She obtained her master's degree at Hochschule für Musik Franz Liszt, Weimar under the guidance of Grigory Gruzman. Since becoming a laureate of the XVI International Chopin Piano Competition in Warsaw, Tysman has emerged as one of the leading French pianists of her generation.

== Awards and prizes ==
- Maestro Award from the French Magazine Pianiste for her Chopin release vol.2 (2013)
- New York Mackenzie Award / IKIF (2012, 1st Prize)
- Warsaw XVI International Chopin Piano Competition (2010, Finalist & Distinction Prize)
- Minneapolis International Piano-e-competition (2009, 3rd Prize)
- Hong-Kong International Piano Competition (2008, 5th Prize)
- Poznan European Piano Competition (2008, 6th Prize)
- Darmstadt International Chopin Piano Competition (2006, 1st Prize)
- Laureate of the "Chopin Foundation" in Hanover (2006)
- Havelland International Piano Competition (2005, 1st Prize)
- Elise Meyer Foundation in Hamburg (2005, 2nd Prise)
- Laureate of the "Cziffra Foundation" in Senlis (France, 2004)
- Newport International Competition For Young Pianists (2003, 3rd Prize)

== Recordings ==
In addition to frequent live radio broadcasts, Tysman has recorded a selection of works by Frédéric Chopin over two volumes for the German record label, Oehms Classics/Naxos; Vol. 1, in 2010 followed by Vol. 2 in 2013 to much critical acclaim. Patrice Imbaud of L’Education musicale wrote in a CD review: “An interpretation characterized by its sombre clarity, its fiery delicacy, its melancholy sweetness, between exaltation and suffering, between passion and abandon. Fine work, the confirmation of an undeniable talent. An admirable disc.” Tysman also featured on the CD, Chamber Music with Winds - 1849, consisting of chamber works by Robert Schumann for Indésens Records.

== Performances ==
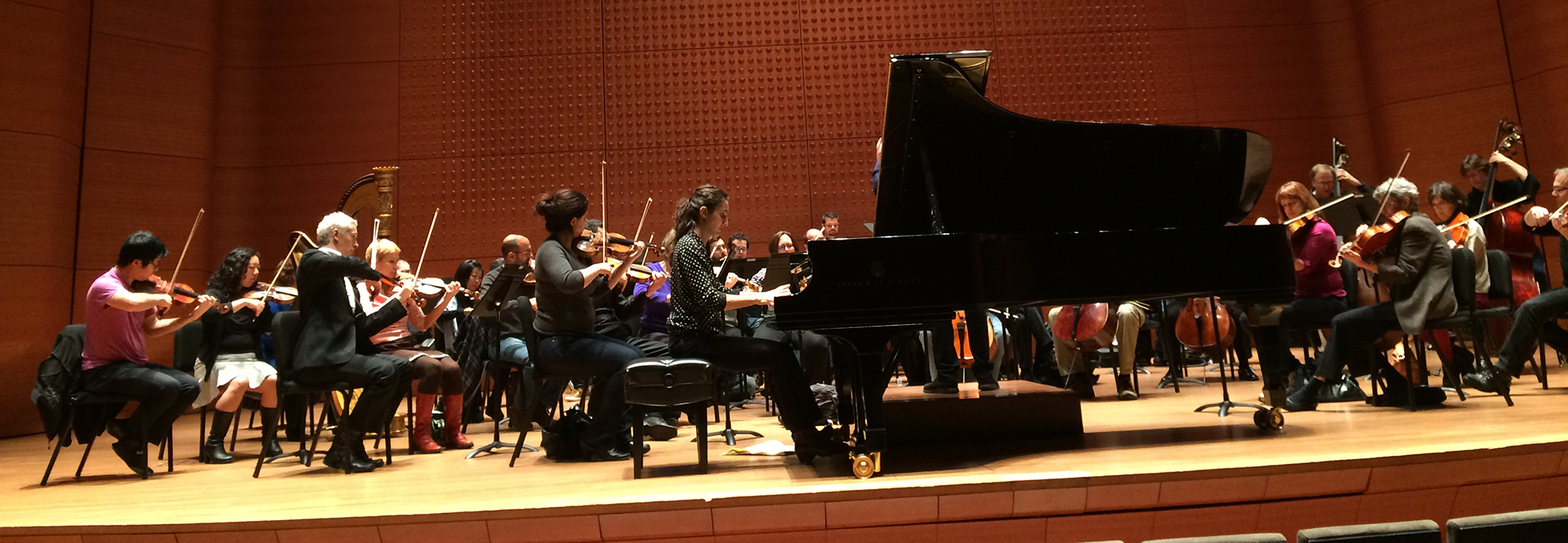
Hélène Tysman, soloist with the Riverside Symphony Orchestra at Alice Tully Hall, Lincoln Center

As a soloist, Tysman has given numerous recitals throughout Europe, Asia and the United States and has performed concertos with the BBC National Orchestra of Wales, Russian Chamber Philharmonic, Minnesota Orchestra, North Czech Philharmonic, Koszalin Philharmonic Orchestra and the Thühingen Philharmonic Orchestra. Most recently, she performed Gabriel Faure's Fantaisie in G for piano and orchestra, Op. 111 with the Riverside Symphony at Alice Tully Hall at Lincoln Center. This was immediately followed by a tour of China where she performed in the country's most prestigious concert halls. In early 2015, Tysman will make her Carnegie Hall debut marking the beginning of an extensive tour of the United States.

== Reviews ==
In the November 2nd edition of the New York Times, David Allen wrote the following after her live performance at Alice Tully Hall, Lincoln Center: “Playing with a warm touch and a dreamy sensibility that never turned too introspective or indulgent, Ms. Tysman made a good case for this amiable work. (Faure Concerto) There was nothing more that could have been done for Chopin’s “Grande Polonaise Brillante” (Op. 22, 1831). With its preface, an “Andante spianato” composed after the Polonaise, this piece is usually heard in its solo form. But the Polonaise — not the Andante, also performed here — has an orchestral part, too, albeit an uninventive one. Again, Ms. Tysman's playing was polished and attractive, the right-hand melody spun out delicately without becoming precious.”

John Allison of the Daily Telegraph wrote upon the conclusion of the Chopin International Piano Competition: "Among the unplaced finalists, I particularly admired the poetic playing of France's Hélène Tysman."

In 2012, Jan Kreyßig of Liszt Magazine wrote: Pianist Hélène Tysman compelled recognition in the highly prestigious Frédéric Chopin International Piano Competition in 2010 in Warsaw, ahead of 300 participants, convincing a high-level jury with jurors such as Martha Argerich, Fou Ts’ong and Nelson Freire. The 29-year-old Frenchwoman did not obtain a first prize but an Honorary Distinction Prize, thereby finding herself on the same footing as previous prizewinners Krystian Zimerman and Rafał Blechacz.
