= Nimrod David Pfeffer =

Israeli-American conductor and pianist

- נמרוד דוד פפר
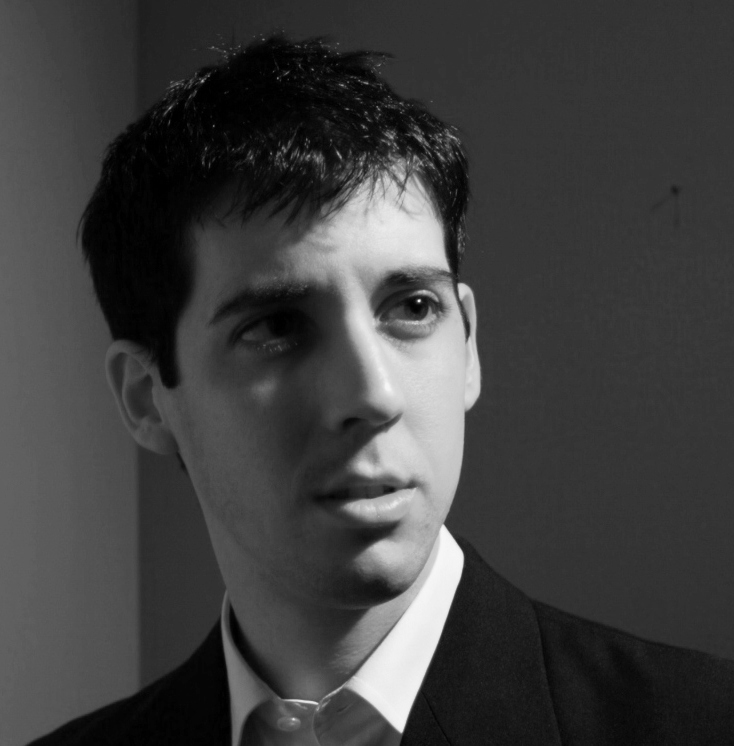
- Nimrod David Pfeffer
- Born: November 14, 1984 (age 41) American
- Education: The Juilliard School (M.M.); Mannes College of Music (M.M., P.S.D.)
- Occupations: Conductor, Pianist
- Years active: 2007–present
- Known for: Conductor at the Metropolitan Opera; Music Director of the Lyric Opera Company of Guatemala
- Awards: Davis Projects for Peace Award (2009)
- Website: nimroddavidpfeffer.com

Nimrod David Pfeffer (Hebrew: נמרוד דוד פפר; born November 14, 1984) is an Israeli-American conductor and pianist. He is a conductor at the Metropolitan Opera in New York and is Music Director of the Lyric Opera Company of Guatemala.

== Biography ==
Pfeffer has conducted orchestras including the San Francisco Symphony Orchestra, the Hungarian State Opera Orchestra, the Hungarian National Philharmonic Orchestra, the Mariinsky Theatre Orchestra, the Nuremberg Symphony Orchestra, and the Stuttgart Philharmonic. His opera engagements have included the Metropolitan Opera, the Komische Oper Berlin, the Palau de les Arts Reina Sofía in Valencia, the Polish National Opera, the Juilliard Opera, and the Israeli Opera.

A sought-after conductor of Mozart, Pfeffer made his Metropolitan Opera debut in the 2021–22 season with Le Nozze di Figaro, and returned in 2024–25 to conduct Julie Taymor's production of The Magic Flute. In 2026-27 he returns to the Met to conduct Phelim McDermott’s production of Così fan tutte, launching the Met’s Live in HD season. He has also conducted Die Zauberflöte at the Komische Oper Berlin, the Israel Opera, and the Polish National Opera, and led productions of Don Giovanni, La Clemenza di Tito, and Così fan tutte at the Palau de les Arts Reina Sofía in Valencia, the Israel Opera, and the Juilliard Opera.

In 2016, Pfeffer was named Music Director of the Lyric Opera Company of Guatemala, after conducting the company's inaugural production of Rigoletto. In subsequent seasons, he conducted new productions of L'elisir d'amore, La Bohème, and La Traviata.

Pfeffer is also a concert pianist, who performs as soloist with orchestras, recitalist, chamber musician, and vocal accompanist. He often performs concertos while conducting from the keyboard.

Dedicated to promoting dialogue between Arabs and Jews in Israel, Pfeffer presented a concert for peace in 2009 at Carnegie Hall’s Weill Recital Hall with Arab-Israeli pianist Bishara Haroni. The concert benefited the Jezreel Valley Music Center, a music school where Arabs and Jews study music together, and raised funds and awareness for the institution. Pfeffer received the Davis Projects for Peace Award for this initiative.

Pfeffer completed his Master's degree in Orchestral Conducting as a student of Alan Gilbert at The Juilliard School, as a recipient of the Bruno Walter Scholarship. He also holds a Master's degree and Professional Studies Diplomas in Piano Performance and in Orchestral Conducting from Mannes College of Music, and is a graduate of The Metropolitan Opera's Lindemann Young Artist Development Program. His teachers included Gideon Hatzor, Vadim Monastyrski, Pnina Salzman, Victor Rosenbaum, Carl Schachter, Michael Wolpe, André Hajdu, Claude Frank, Byron Janis, Alan Gilbert, James Levine, and Richard Goode.
