= Margarita Balanas =

Latvian cellist and conductor (born 1993)

- Born: Dobele, Latvia
- Genres: Classical
- Occupations: Cellist, conductor
- Instrument: Cello
- Website: margaritabalanas.com

Margarita Balanas (born 30 September 1993) is a Latvian concert cellist and conductor.

== Career ==
Balanas won her first international competition at age eight, and made her concert debut in London at Wigmore Hall at age 17.

She performed at the Royal Festival Hall in London, and at Corum as part of the Festival de Radio France et Montpellier with her sister Kristine Balanas.

Balanas has appeared as a soloist with Iași "Moldova" Philharmonic Orchestra, conducted by Gabriel Bebeselea.

Appearing with Carlos Izcaray conducting the Orquestra Sinfonica do Porto Casa da Música, she performed Pyotr Ilyich Tchaikovsky's Variations on a Rococo Theme in 2015.

She performed with Lynn Harrell at the Adelaide International Cello Festival in 2014. Her playing was favorably noted.

In 2018, she performed with the Orchestra of St John's, conducted by John Lubbock at Ashmolean Museum Proms.

In 2019, she and her sister performed at The Alpine Fellowship annual symposium.

Balanas was selected by Gautier Capuçon for the "Classe d'Excellence de Violoncelle" at the Fondation Louis Vuitton with performances broadcast on Medici.tv.

== Instruments ==
Balanas plays a Charles-Adolphe Gand ‘Auguste Tolbecque 1849 cello. Her former instruments include Nicolo Gagliano and Giovanni Battista Rogeri cellos.

== Personal life ==
Balanas is the sister of violinists Kristine Balanas and Roberts Balanas.
