= Kristine Balanas =

Latvian violinist (born 1990)

Kristīne Balanas (born 8 May 1990) is a Latvian violinist who is a laureate of many international violin competitions.

== Early life and education ==
Balanas received her first violin lessons at the age of seven with Olita Meldere. She later attended the Emīls Dārziņš Specialist Music School and studied with Romans Šnē.

Balanas studied with Professor György Pauk at the Royal Academy of Music in London for her undergraduate degree, and graduated with a Master of Arts in 2014. From 2014 to 2015, she was an Artist-in-Residence at Buckingham University.

== Career ==
Balanas has performed with the National Symphony Orchestra of Ireland, the Moscow Soloists Chamber Orchestra, the Latvian National Symphony Orchestra, and the Sendai Philharmonic Orchestra. She has performed as a soloist in the Orchestre de Chambre de Paris, London Philharmonic, RTÉ National Symphony Orchestra, Sendai Philharmonic Orchestra, EUYO Symphony Orchestra, Polish Chamber Philharmonic Orchestra, Sinfonietta Riga, and Latvian National Orchestra.

The Guardian's Joe Staines ranked Balanas as the best violinist at the Bishopsgate Institute's 2009 J&A Beare Solo Bach competition, characterising her performance as "outstanding" and "wonderful." The following year she won second place.

Balanas released a music video in April 2018, of her performing Ysaÿe's "Obsession" from his Second Violin Sonata, and including her "dressing up as a violin-hurling femme fatale surrounded by ballet dancers," according to The Strad. In 2020, she released a music video of her performance of Philip Glass' The Baptism.

== Honors and awards ==
- 2004 and 2008, 1st Prize in the Latvian National Competition for Violinists
- 2007 12th Kloster Schöntal Violin Competition (1st Prize and 'Virtuoso Prize')
- 2010 J & A Beare International Solo Bach Competition, 2nd place
- 2011 30th Rudolf Lipizer Violin Competition in Gorizia, Italy, (Fourth prize and best performance of a 20th-century concerto)
- 2015 Julius Isserlis Scholar, Royal Philharmonic Society
- 2017 ARD International Music Competition, Third prize, violin
- 2018, elected Associate of the Royal Academy of Music
- 2018 Premio al Talento Joven of the Excelentia Foundation in Madrid, Spain (Winner)

== Personal life ==
Balanas has a younger sister, Margarita, who is a cellist and a brother, Roberts, who is a violinist.
