= Ingolf Wunder =

Austrian pianist (born 1985)

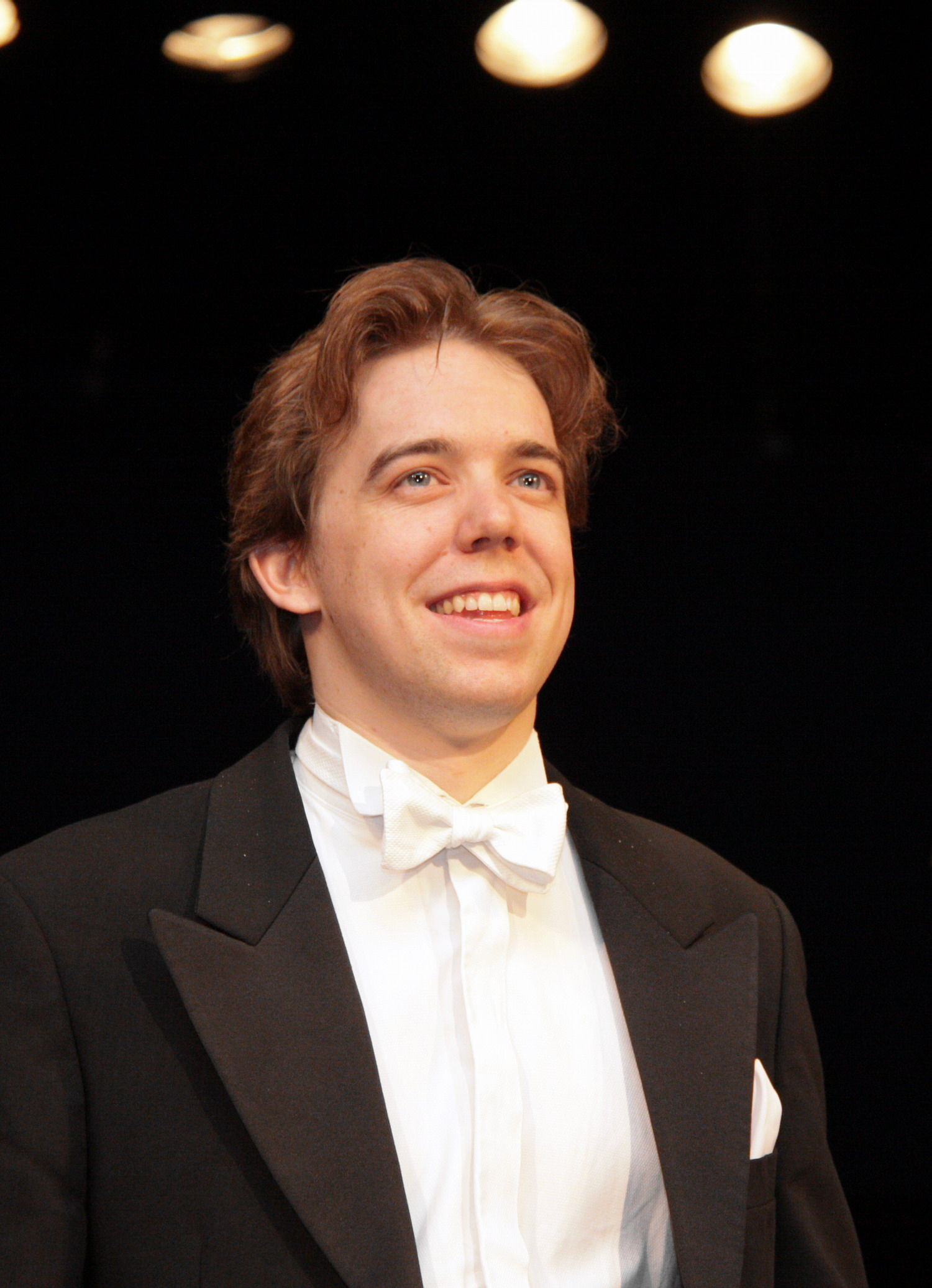
- Ingolf Wunder in 2011

Background information
- Born: 8 September 1985 (age 40); Klagenfurt, Austria
- Genres: Classical
- Occupations: Pianist, conductor, co-founder
- Instruments: Piano
- Label: Deutsche Grammophon

Ingolf Wunder (born 8 September 1985) is an Austrian classical pianist. In 2010, Wunder was the second prize winner at the XVI International Chopin Piano Competition in Warsaw, Poland. He also won special prizes for best concerto, best Polonaise-Fantasie performance, and the public prize at the competition.

== Career ==
Wunder had his first music lesson at the age of four, initially learning the violin. His talent for the piano was discovered at the age of 14. He studied at the conservatories of Klagenfurt and Linz before joining the University of Music and Performing Arts Vienna. A participant in the earlier 2005 International Chopin Piano Competition, Wunder failed to make the last stage. From 2008 to 2010 he studied under Adam Harasiewicz, who was himself the winner of the Chopin Competition in 1955, in preparation for the 2010 International Chopin Piano Competition.

He has performed around the world, both in solo recital and with orchestras.

In 2019, Wunder had his public conducting debut at the Rubinstein Philharmonic in Lodz, Poland. In 2020, he conducted Górecki's 3rd Symphony at the Opera Leśna.

In 2019, Wunder gave a TEDx talk about the decline in quality of music and how to get out of it. In 2021, he spoke at the United Nations' IGF about the importance of quality music and music education for all of us, in a world full of technology and Artificial intelligence.

In 2022, Ingolf Wunder, together with Paulina Wunder co-founded a Music AI project "Frycek", in collaboration with ETH Zurich / SDSC and Kalaidos Music University. It focuses on decoding Wunder's hypothesis of a "code" of musical interpretation, aiming to identify the emotive impact of music through performance. This research initiative and first results have gained notable attention, earning Ingolf Wunder the moniker 'musical geneticist' in a feature by Corriere della Sera, highlighting his innovative use of artificial intelligence to uncover the impulses behind music interpretation.

== Discography ==
- 2006: Works by Frédéric Chopin, Maurice Ravel and Franz Liszt
- 2011: Works by Frédéric Chopin
- 2012: INGOLF WUNDER 300
- 2014: Tchaikovsky & Chopin, with St. Petersburg Philharmonic Orchestra, Vladimir Ashkenazy
- 2016: Chopin & Liszt in Warsaw

== Awards ==
- September 1999; VI Concorso Internazionale di Musica - Premio Vittoria Caffa Righetti (Cortemilia, Italy) – 1st Prize
- October 1999: XIV European Music Competition in (Torino, Italy) – the winner of his age group
- November 1999: 63. Steinway Piano Competition (Hamburg, Germany) – 1st Prize
- March 2000: Concours Musical de France in (Asti) – 1st Prize
- May 2000: Prima la musica 2000 Music Competition (Feldkirch, Austria) – 1st Prize
- June 2000: VI Trofeo Internazionale (Casarza Ligure, Italy) – 1st Prize
- September 2001: 36. Großer Ferenc Liszt Wettbewerb in (Budapest, Hungary) - Liszt Prize City of Budapest
- October 2010: XVI International Chopin Piano Competition in (Warsaw, Poland) – 2nd Prize, Special prizes: "Best Performance of The Polonaise-Fantasy op. 61" and " Best Performance of a Concerto".
