= Lukas Geniušas =

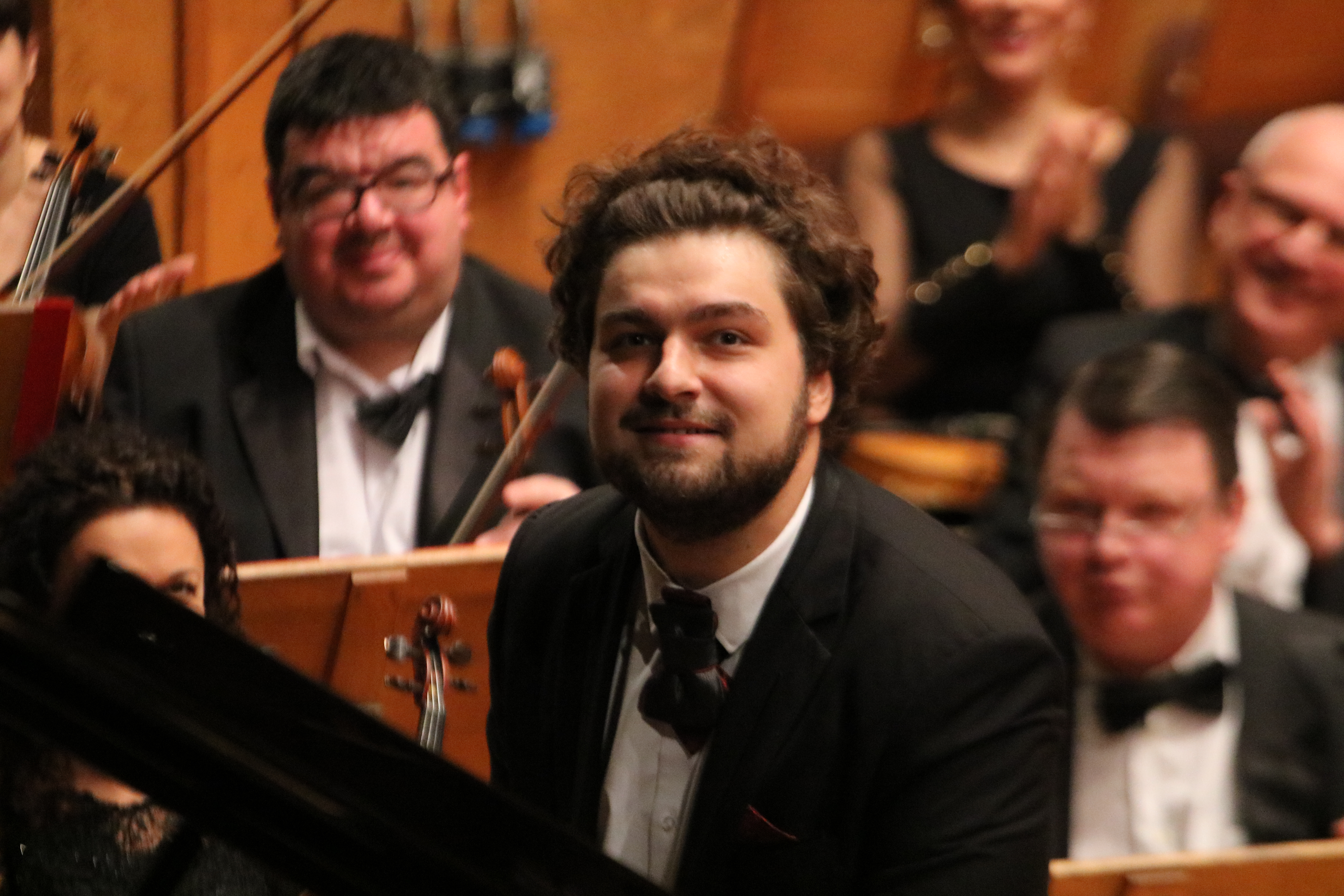
- Lukas Geniušas in Bulgaria, 2020

Background information
- Born: July 1, 1990 (age 35); Moscow, Russian SFSR, Soviet Union
- Genres: Film score, contemporary classical, classical, electronic, contemporary, pop
- Occupation: Pianist
- Years active: 2008–present
- Website: https://geniusas.com/

Lukas Geniušas (Russian: Лукас Генюшас; born July 1, 1990) is a Russian-Lithuanian pianist. Geniušas began to study piano at the age of five, and in 1996 he entered the Moscow Frederic Chopin College of Music Performing.

He studied piano with professor Vera Gornostayeva at the Moscow State Conservatory. Since 2004, he has received the M. Rostropovich Foundation scholarship.

He started to perform in public in 1996, and since that time he performed with various orchestras in venues in Moscow, St. Petersburg, Vilnius, Wroclaw and Hamburg. He arranged solo appearances in Russia, Poland, Sweden, Germany, France, Switzerland, Lithuania, and Austria.

== Family ==
His father is the Lithuanian pianist Petras Geniušas, and his mother is Moscow State Conservatory professor Xenia Knorre (Russian: Ксения Вадимовна Кнорре). Lukas's grandmother is the Russian pianist Vera Gornostayeva (Russian: Вера Васильевна Горностаева). He plays duo piano with his wife Anna Geniushene who is also a highly accomplished pianist, having won the Silver Medal at the Sixteenth Van Cliburn International Piano Competition.

== Awards ==
- 2002: St. Petersburg, Russia, International Piano Competition: "Step to Mastership", 1st place;
- 2003: Moscow, Russia First Open Competition of Central Music School, 1st place;
- 2004: Moscow, Russia, International Frederic Chopin Piano Competition for young pianists, 2nd place;
- 2005: Salt Lake City, United States, Gina Bachauer International Piano Competition, Category Young Artists, 2nd place;
- 2007: Scotland, United Kingdom, Scottish International Piano Competition, 2nd place;
- 2008: Moscow, Russia, Competition "Youth Delphic Games of Russia", 1st place;
- 2008: San Marino, International Piano Competition, 2nd place;
- 2009: Pianello Val Tidone, Italy, International Piano Competition "Music della Val Tidone", 1st place;
- 2010: Salt Lake City, United States, Gina Bachauer International Piano Competition, 1st place;
- 2010: Warsaw, Poland, XVI International Chopin Piano Competition, 2nd place.
- 2015: Moscow, Russia, International Tchaikovsky Competition, 2nd place (split between Lukas Geniušas and George Li).
