= Amir Tebenikhin =

Kazakhstani musician (born 1977)

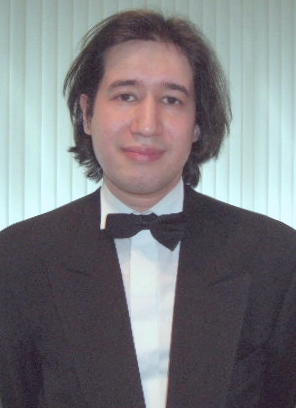
Amir Tebenikhin (2007)

Amir Tebenikhin (born 1977) is a Kazakhstani pianist.

He won the 1999 Vianna da Motta Competition - the last winner for 11 years when Akopova won the competition. He subsequently made his recording debut for Naxos Records and performed at the Carnegie Hall, the Salle Pleyel and the Wigmore Hall.

He later ranked 6th at the inaugural Sendai International Music Competition, obtained a diploma at the 2003 Queen Elisabeth Music Competition and was awarded 3rd prize at the 2004 Glasgow Competition. In 2007, Tebenikhin won the Anton Rubinstein Competition and reached the semi-finals of the II Beethoven Competition in Bonn.
