= International Piano Academy Lake Como =

Music school in Italy

The International Piano Academy Lake Como is a piano academy.

== Administration ==
- President of Honor: Martha Argerich
- President and Artistic Director: William Grant Naboré
- Vice President: Stanislav Ioudenitch
