= William Grant Naboré =

American pianist

William Grant Naboré is an American pianist and pedagogue, born in Roanoke, Virginia where he studied with Kathleen Kelly Coxe, a pupil of Alexander Siloti. He later studied with musicologist Anne McClenney at the Hollins College in his early years.

He received a full scholarship to study at the Accademia di Santa Cecilia in Rome with Carlo Zecchi, a pupil of Busoni and Schnabel and also with Renata Borgatti. He received his Master's degree with honors from this institution and afterwards won the First Prize of Virtuosity and the Paderewski Award from the Conservatoire de Geneve. He also studied Musicology with Luigi Ronga at the University of Rome and Harpsichord with Ferruccio Vignanelli at the Conservatorio di Santa Cecilia.

He also studied in England with Denise Lassimonne, the assistant of Tobias Matthay.

He continued his studies with Alicia de Larrocha, Rudolf Serkin, George Szell and with Pierre Fournier for Chamber Music.

He has played all over the world with important orchestras in prestigious venues and chamber music with famous ensembles such as the Amadeus Quartet, the Talich Quartet and the Gabrieli Quartet.

He has given Masterclasses all over the world and was the founding Director of the International Piano Foundation “Theo Lieven” in 1993 and in 2002 with Martha Argerich as President, he created the famous International Piano Academy Lake Como in Italy.

In 2017 he received the Vendome Award from the Orpheus Foundation of Switzerland for his outstanding contribution to classical music in discovering, teaching and promoting exceptional young pianists.
