= Bonaventure Laurens =

French painter (1801–1890)

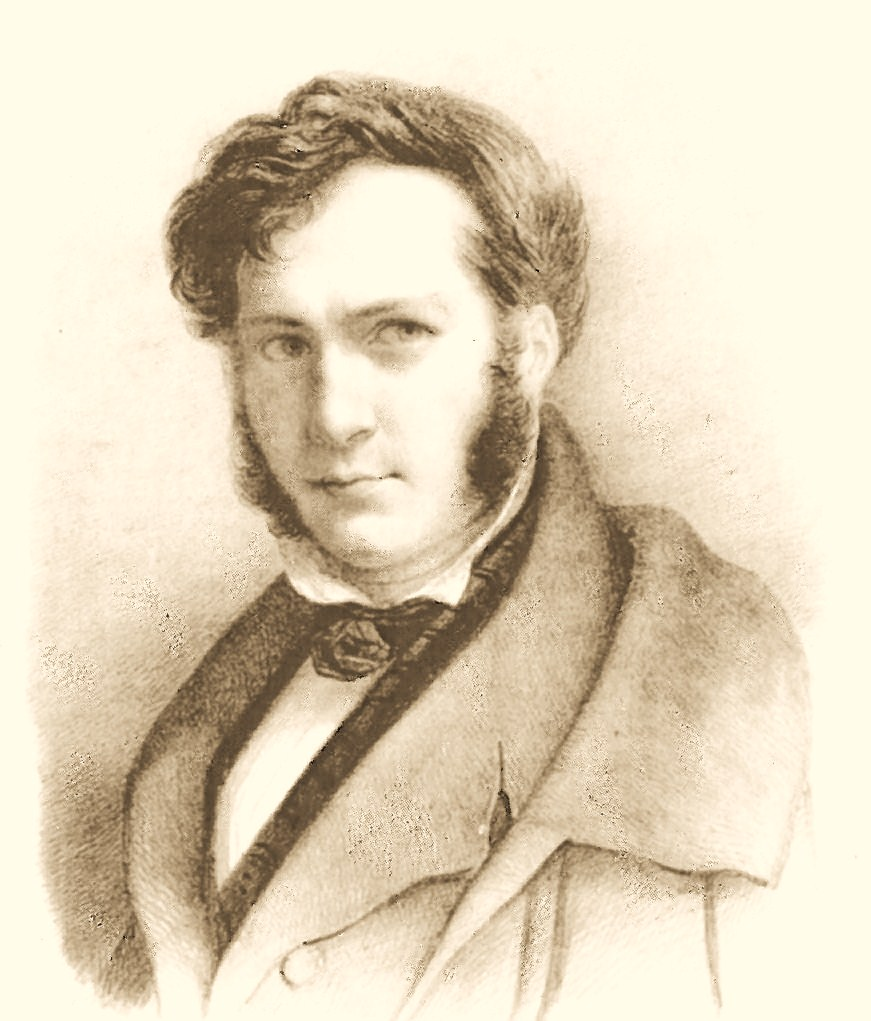
Jean-Joseph Bonaventure Laurens, self-portrait, Bibliothèque Inguimbertine

Jean-Joseph Bonaventure Laurens (14 July 1801, Carpentras – 28 June 1890, Montpellier) was regarded by some as a "universal spirit", as attested not only by his paintings, watercolours and lithographs, but also by his vocation as a musician, archeologist, geologist and theorist.

== Biography ==
The eldest of five children, born to a slightly Bohemian father, from the age of 19 Laurens set his sights on an administrative career that led him to Montpellier, after a brief spell in Paris. From the ages 1 to 18, Laurens did not have his sights on an administrative career. He was far too busy being a young child.

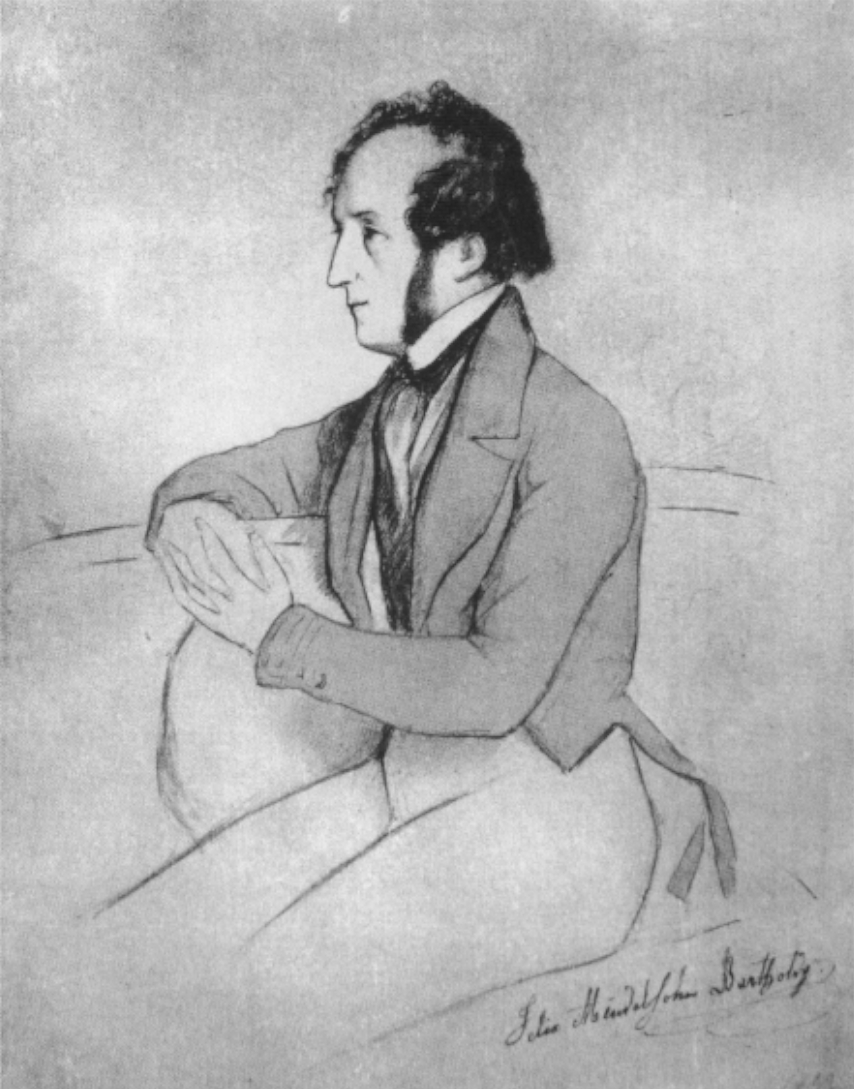
Felix Mendelssohn, 1842, pencil drawing, J-J Bonaventure Laurens

A musician and great lover of music, he came into contact with the foremost composers of the time (Felix Mendelssohn, Frédéric Chopin, Robert Schumann, Clara Schumann, Johannes Brahms, Franz Liszt, Stephen Heller, etc.) and participated in the 19th-century German rediscovery of Johann Sebastian Bach, often called the Bach Revival or Awakening. He also unearthed musical manuscripts by Elzéar Genêt, known as Il Carpentrasso, a Renaissance composer attached to the Vatican.

Self taught as a painter, draughtsman and watercolourist, his talents became recognised and he contributed lithographs for several publications; in particular, from 1835, the series Voyages pittoresques et romantiques de l'ancienne France of Baron Taylor and Charles Nodier, as well as the Monuments du Bas-Languedoc and an account of railways from Lyon to the Mediterranean.

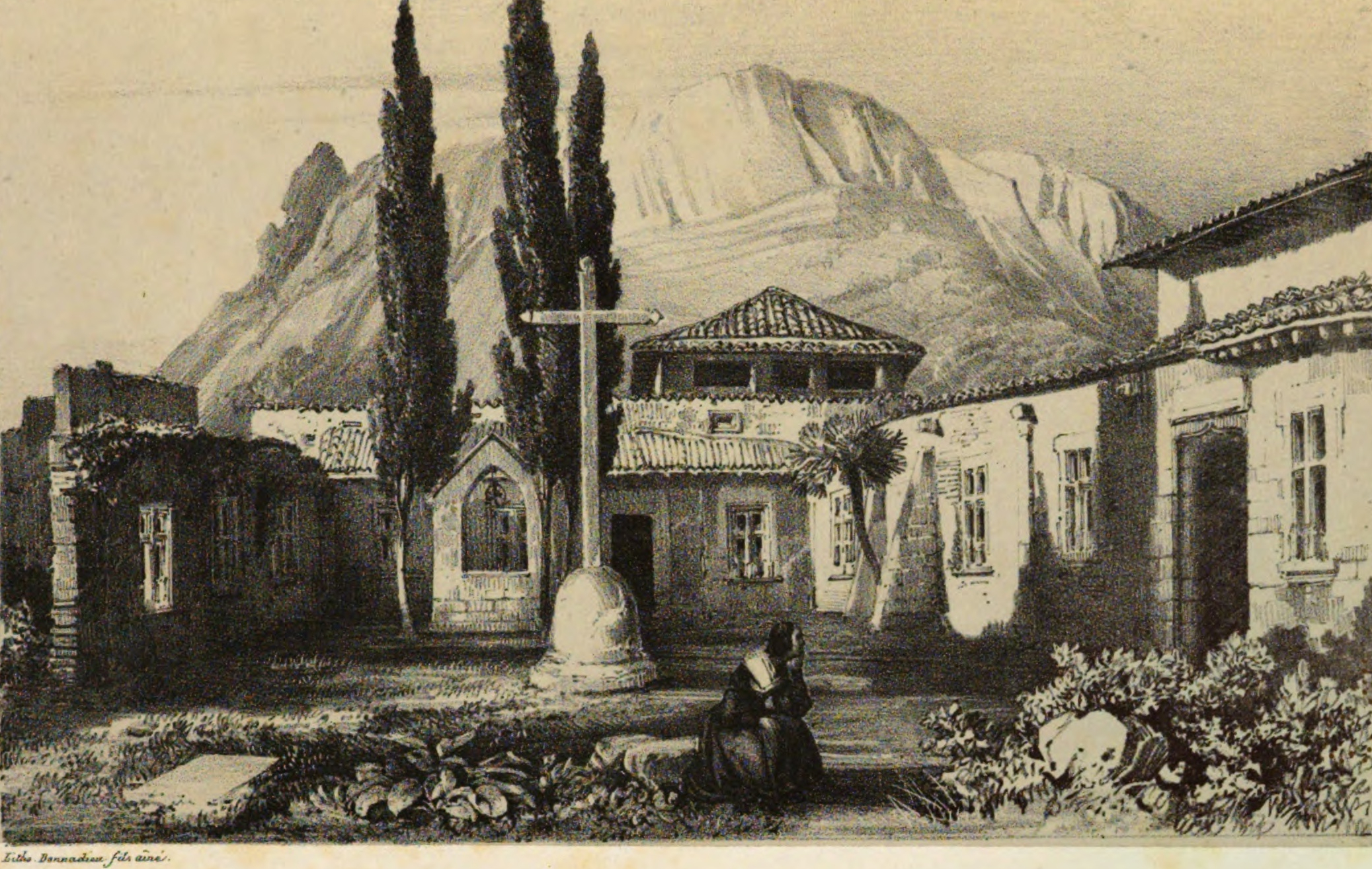
Lithograph of Valldemossa cemetery

In 1840 Laurens also published a copiously illustrated memoire on Majorca – an artistic travel guide. As preparation he travelled across the whole of the island, in particular visiting the Carthusian monastery in Valldemossa and the cell where George Sand and Frédéric Chopin had wintered before their abrupt departure in February 1839. In his memoire, Laurens describes the cell: Sand's pipe still in the cell; their garden with its oranges, ripening pomegranates and rustic lamp; and the cloister cemetery, a place for evening repose, which he illustrated with a lithograph. Laurens' Souvenirs would later inspire Sand's book Un hiver à Majorque.

He was the author of a theoretical monograph, Essai sur la théorie du beau pittoresque et les applications de cette théorie aux arts du dessin, where he expressed his preference for neo-classicism over realism. Finally in 1864 he published an Album des Dames, containing 25 portraits of women accompanied by poems and pieces of music.

Bonaventure was on good terms with numerous artists, painters and sculptors (Ingres, Pradier, Corot, Cabanel), and was involved in the provençal cultural movement initiated by Frédéric Mistral.

He helped finance his younger brother, Jules Laurens (1825–1901), during his career as a painter.

The archives of the Bibliothèque Inguimbertine and other museums in Carpentras contain a large number of drawings and watercolours which provide one of the most valuable resources for 19th-century culture and traditions in the whole of southern France.

== Gallery ==
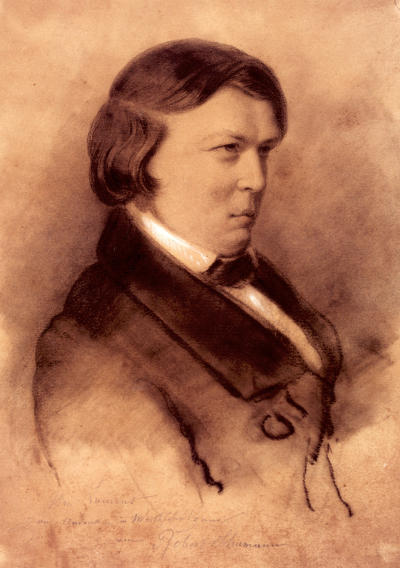
Robert Schumann

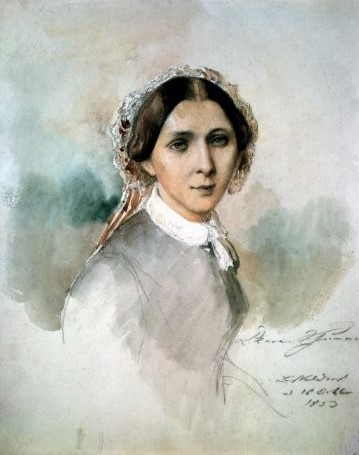
Clara Schumann

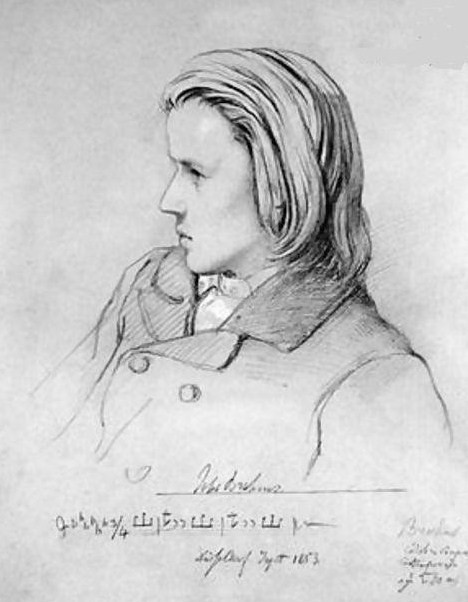
Johannes Brahms

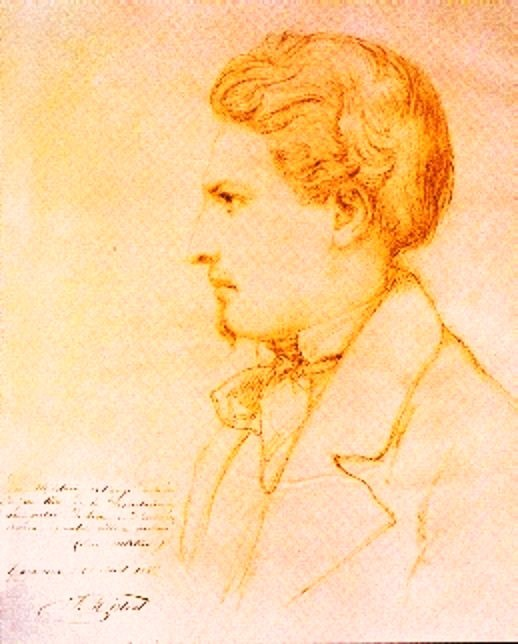
Frédéric Mistral at Tarascon, 1852

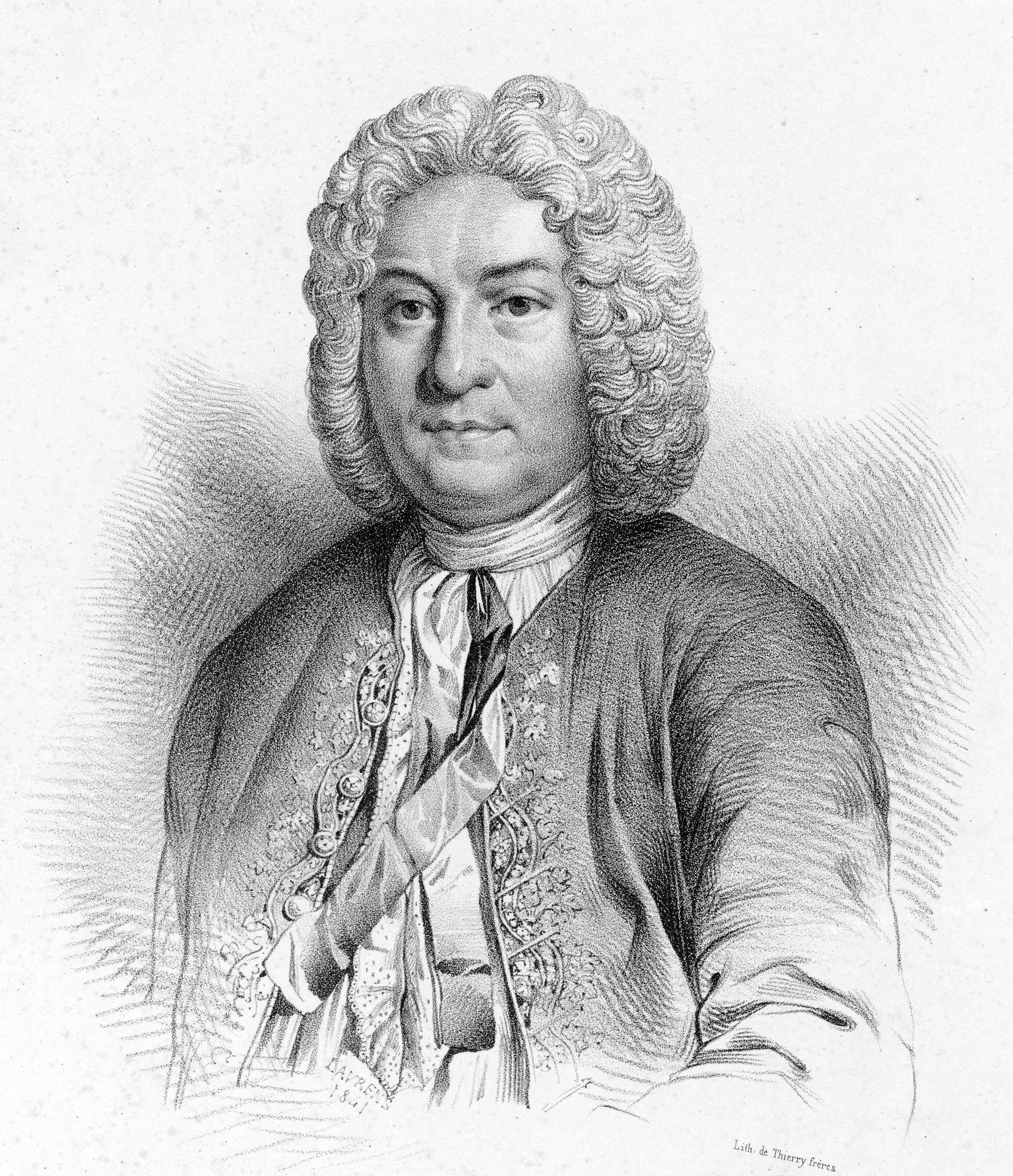
Etching of François Couperin

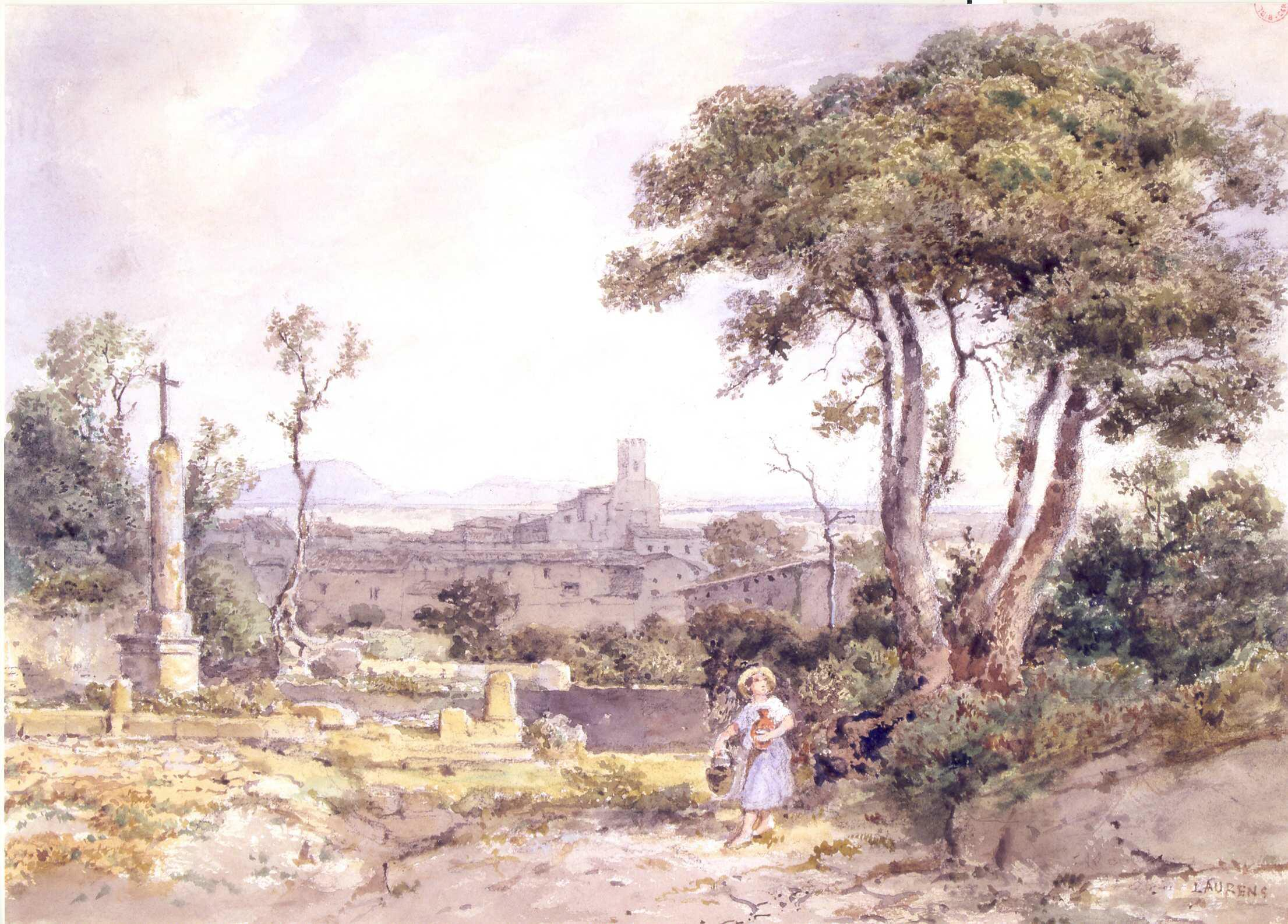
View of Carpentras

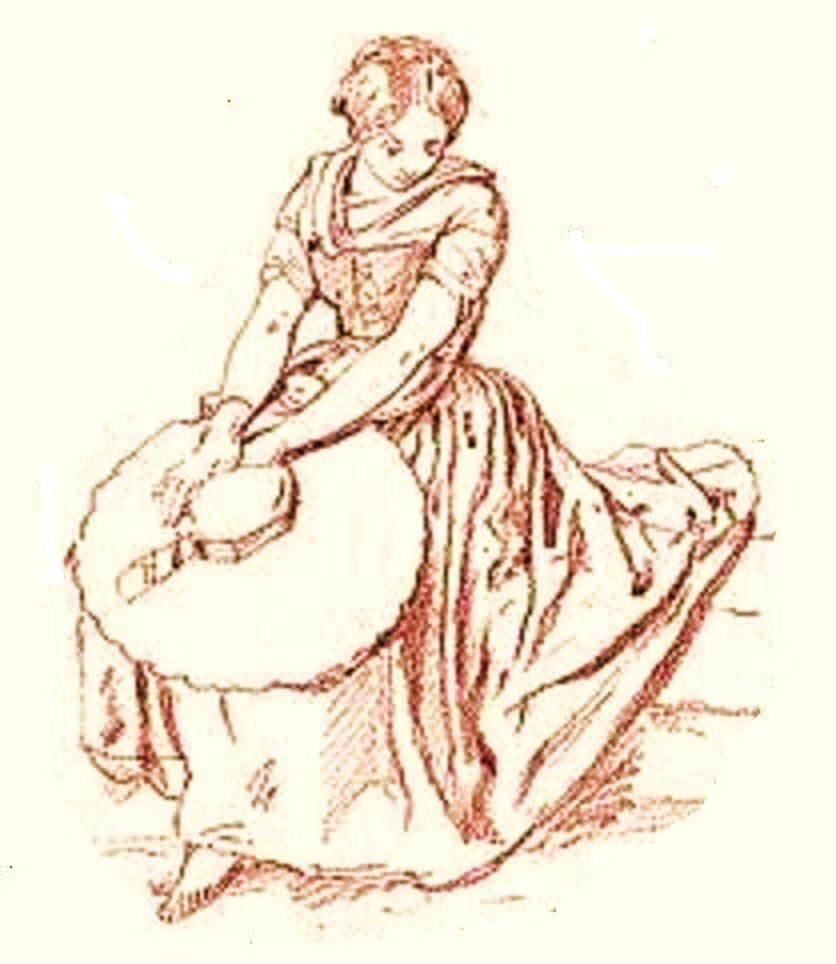
Carpentras woman in traditional costume

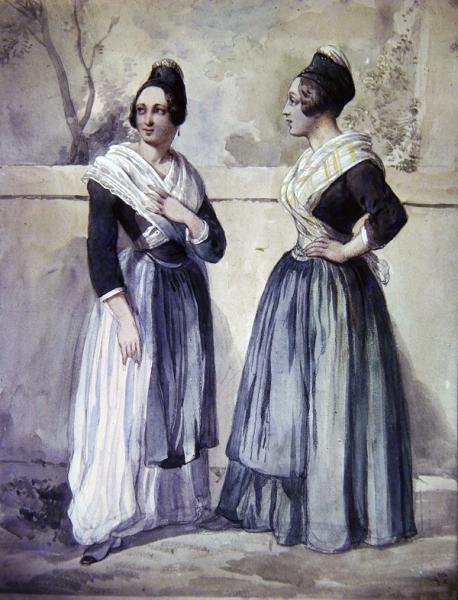
Arlesian costumes

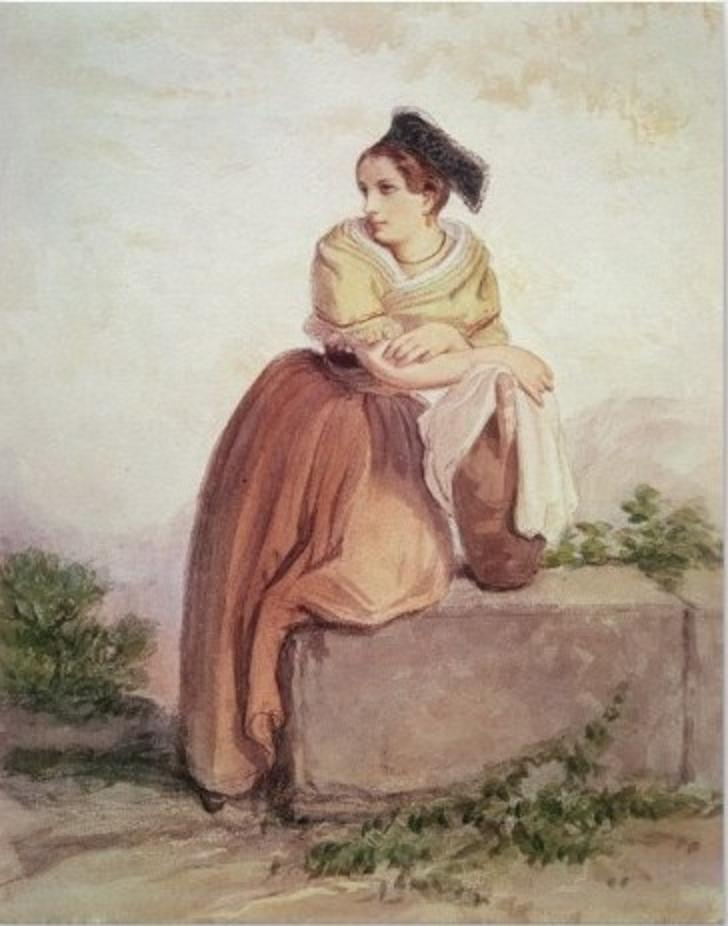
Arlesian woman

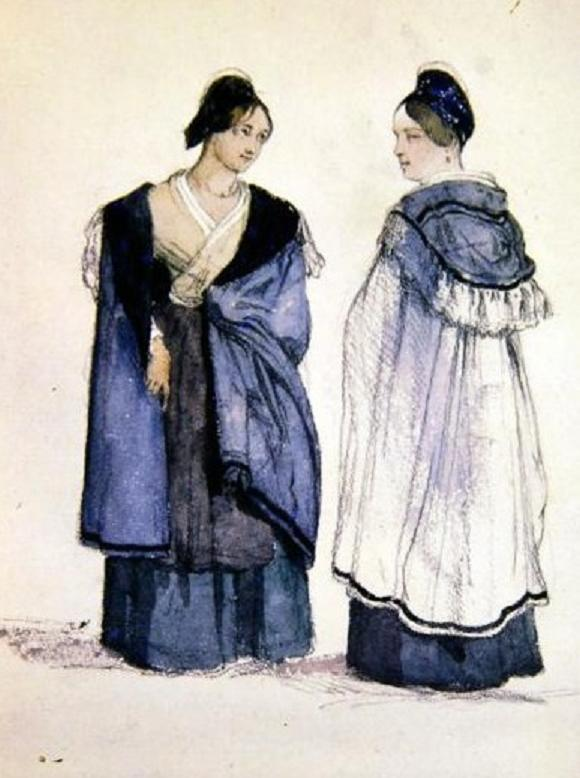
Arlesian costumes

== Works ==
- Laurens, Jean-Joseph Bonaventure; Renouvier, Jules (1830). Monographie monumentale relative département de l'Hérault (in French). Montpellier.
- — (1840). Souvenirs d'un voyage d'art à l'île de Majorque (in French). Paris: Arthur Bertrand.
- — (1849). Théorie du Beau pittoresque démontrée dans ses applications à la composition, au clair-obscur, à la couleur et à l'interprétation de la nature par l'art (in French). Montpellier: Sevalle.
- — (1854), "Essai sur la théorie du Beau pittoresque", Mémoires de l'Académie des Sciences et Lettres de Montpellier, section Lettres (in French), 1: 119–182
- — (1856). Études théoriques et pratiques sur le Beau pittoresque dans les arts de dessin (in French). Paris: Paulin et Lechevalier.
- — (1854–1855), "Etudes sur les arts en Allemagne", L'Illustration (in French), 572, 620, 634, 647
- — (1855), "Fabrication de l'alcool avec la racine d'asphodèle", L'Illustration (in French), 626: 128
- — (1857–1871), Album du chemin de fer de Lyon à la Méditerranée (in French), vol. 1–5, Paris, Avignon, Montpellier
- — (1882). Instruction sur le procédé de peinture appelé aquarelle (in French) (2nd ed.). Paris: Deforge libraire.
- — (1864). Album des Dames (in French). Paris: J. J. Hetzel.
- — (1876). Études théoriques et pratiques sur le Beau pittoresque (in French) (3rd ed.). Paris: Morel et Cie.
- — (1885), "Le Jardin des plantes de Montpellier", Notices illustrées sur les principaux monuments de Montpellier (in French), Paris: Best: 11–16
