= Scherzos (Chopin) =

Four compositions by Chopin

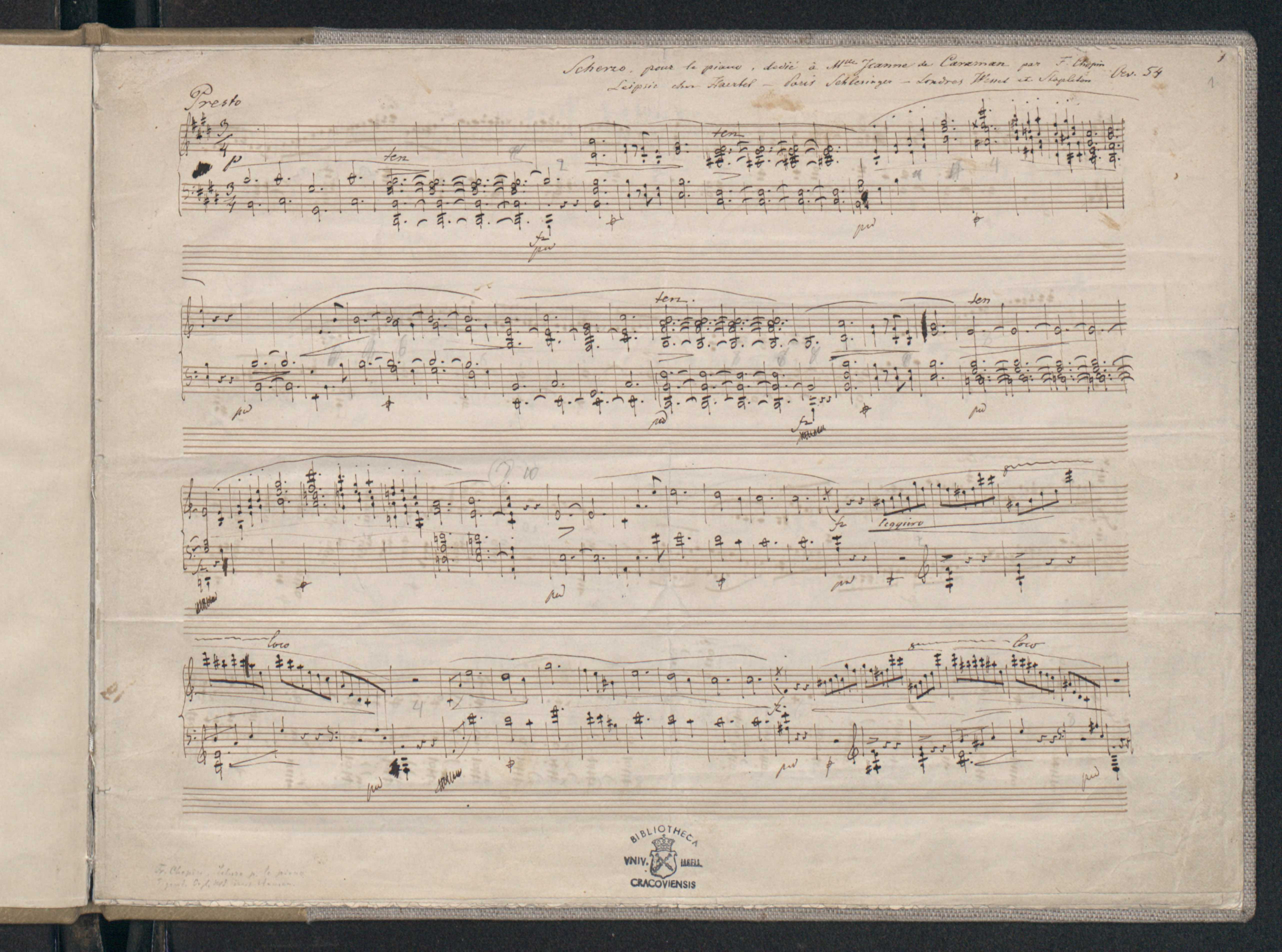
Autograph manuscript of Scherzo No. 4, Op. 54 in E major, 1842–1843, Biblioteka Jagiellońska, Kraków

Frédéric Chopin's four scherzos (or scherzi) are single-movement pieces for solo piano, composed between 1833 and 1843. They are often linked to Chopin's four ballades, composed in roughly the same period; these scherzos are examples of large scale autonomous musical pieces, composed within the classical framework, but surpassing previous expressive and technical limitations. Unlike the classical model, the musical form adopted by Chopin is not characterised by humour or elements of surprise, but by highly charged "gestures of despair and demonic energy". Commenting on the first scherzo, Robert Schumann wrote: "How is 'gravity' to clothe itself if 'jest' goes about in dark veils?" (Note: "wie sich der Ernst kleiden solle, wenn schon der 'Scherz' in dunklen Schleiern geht", Neue Zeitschrift für Musik, 2/1835, p. 155.)

== Overview ==
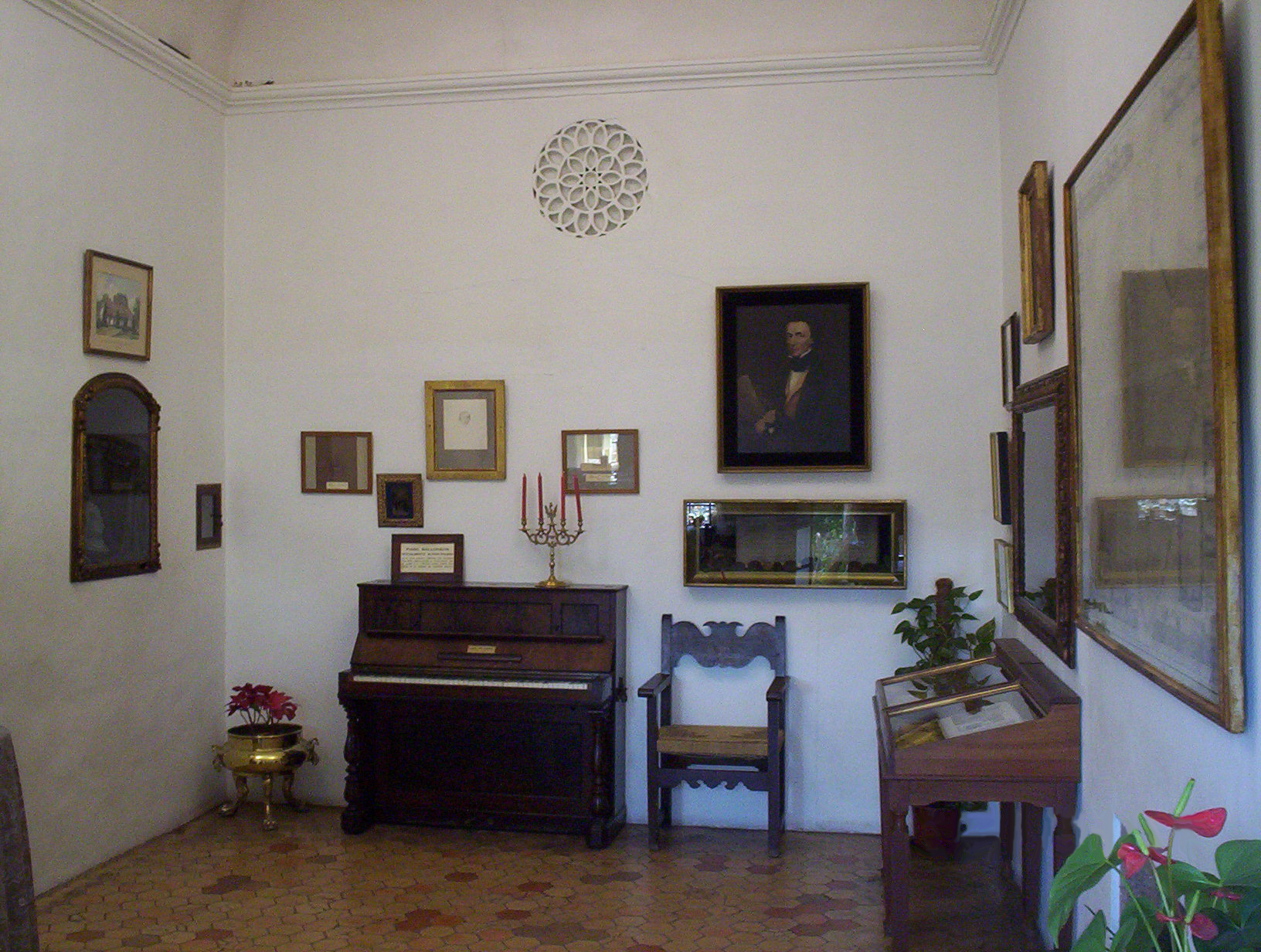
Chopin's Pleyel upright piano in the Valldemossa Charterhouse, Mallorca, where George Sand and he worked during winter 1838–1839

Scherzo No. 3
Played by Martha Argerich

Starting in the early 1830s, after his departure from Poland, Chopin's musical style changed significantly, entering a mature period with compositions of exceptional single-movement pieces on a monumental scale, stamped with his unmistakable signature. There were ten of these extended works—the four ballades, the four scherzos and the two fantaisies (Op. 49 and 61). This musical transformation was preceded by Chopin's new attitude to life: after adulation in Warsaw, he felt disillusioned by lukewarm audiences in Vienna; then his prospects as a pianist-composer seemed less inviting; and lastly nostalgia and the recent 1830 Polish uprising drew him back spiritually to Poland. As a result, the emphasis on his music became focussed on composition instead of performance.

Chopin's early musical style originated in the "brilliant" virtuosic pianism of Daniel Steibelt, Carl Maria von Weber and Johann Nepomuk Hummel. Going beyond the classical music of the late eighteenth century, Chopin's later music revitalised and transcended the brilliant style in several ways: in the first set of Études Op. 10, he introduced new highly concentrated contrapuntal elements; in the Nocturnes, the brilliant effects evolved into a mature ornamental melodic style; and, most importantly, he was able to imbue his works with an over-arching harmonic structure, effortlessly alternating lyrical and virtuosic passages. At the beginning of the 1830s, Chopin thus succeeded in moulding the Viennese multi-movement classical style with the subsequent brilliant style. From that period, sonata form can be discerned in Ballade No. 1 and the brilliant style in Scherzo No. 1. In the same way, Chopin's two late fantaisies breathed new life into the classical keyboard fantasia. For the extended mature works the historical genre titles—"ballade", "scherzo", or "fantaisie"—clearly had significance for Chopin; however, as Chopin scholar Jim Samson comments, "ultimately he transcended them".

The musical form "scherzo" comes from the Italian word 'joke'. In its classical form, it is usually part of a multi-movement work, in triple time with a lively tempo and light-hearted mood. Beethoven's scherzos perfectly exemplify this type of movement, with characteristic sforzandi off the beat, clearly articulated rhythms and rising or falling patterns. The scherzos in Chopin's piano sonatas start from Beethoven's model, particularly for his late sonatas and chamber music. Although various Beethovenian features are preserved—an A–B–A structure with sections A and B contrasting, triple time, pronounced articulation and sforzando accents—in terms of musical depth, Chopin's four scherzos enter into a different and grander realm. They are all marked presto or presto con fuoco and "expand immeasurably both the scale of the genre and its expressive range". In these piano pieces, particular the first three, any initial feeling of levity or jocularity is replaced by "an almost demonic power and energy".

Each of the four scherzos starts with abrupt or fragmentary motifs, which create a sense of tension or unease. The opening gestures of Scherzo No. 1 involve texture, dynamics and range: strident chords are followed by rapid will-o-the-wisp passagework, rising with crescendos—motifs that recur during the movement. In Scherzo No. 2, the initial fragmentary sotto voce rumblings are followed by a dramatic forceful response, all of which are repeated. The gesture that begins Scherzo No. 3 is similar to that of Scherzo No. 2, but less pronounced. The beginning of Scherzo No. 4 alternates two contrasting textures and harmonies—first subdued chords and then faster arched figures that rise and fall with the dynamics. In summary, Chopin established the one-movement scherzos as a genre in which the piece grew out of the opening fragmentary gestures, heard at the outset in the initial short and contrasting musical ideas.

== Pieces ==
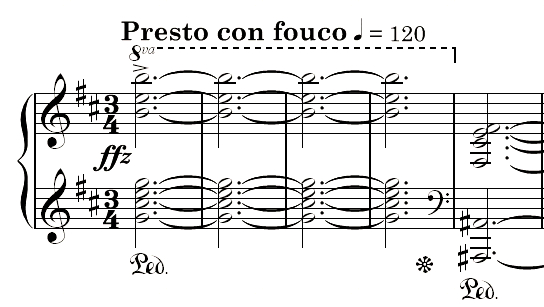
Scherzo No. 1

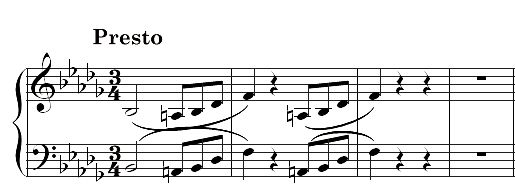
Scherzo No. 2

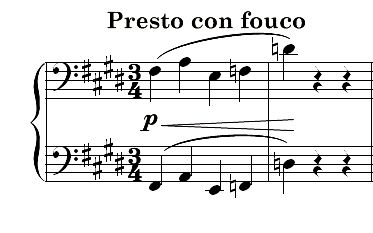
Scherzo No. 3

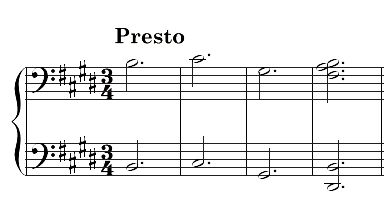
Scherzo No. 4

The four scherzos are:

- The Scherzo No. 1 in B minor, Op. 20, was published in 1835. As to its genesis dates, nothing more is surely known.
- The Scherzo No. 2 in B♭ minor, Op. 31, was composed between 1835 and 1837 in Paris.
- The Scherzo No. 3 in C♯ minor, Op. 39, was composed 1838–1839, begun in the Valldemossa Charterhouse, Mallorca.
- The Scherzo No. 4 in E major, Op. 54, was presumably composed in the summers of 1842 and 1843 in Nohant.

== Recordings ==
The four scherzos are part of the established Chopin piano repertoire and have been recorded by many well-known pianists, including Vladimir Horowitz, Alfred Cortot, Walter Gieseking, Arthur Rubinstein, Emil Gilels, Arturo Benedetti Michelangeli, Maurizio Pollini, Vladimir Ashkenazy, Dinu Lipatti, Sviatoslav Richter, Martha Argerich, Daniel Barenboim, Emanuel Ax, Andrei Gavrilov, John Ogdon, Ivo Pogorelich, Yundi Li, Seong-Jin Cho, Murray Perahia, Krystian Zimerman and Boris Berezovsky.
