= A Winter in Majorca =

Autobiographical novel by George Sand

- Author: George Sand
- Language: French
- Genre: Romantic
- Publication date: 1842
- Publication place: France

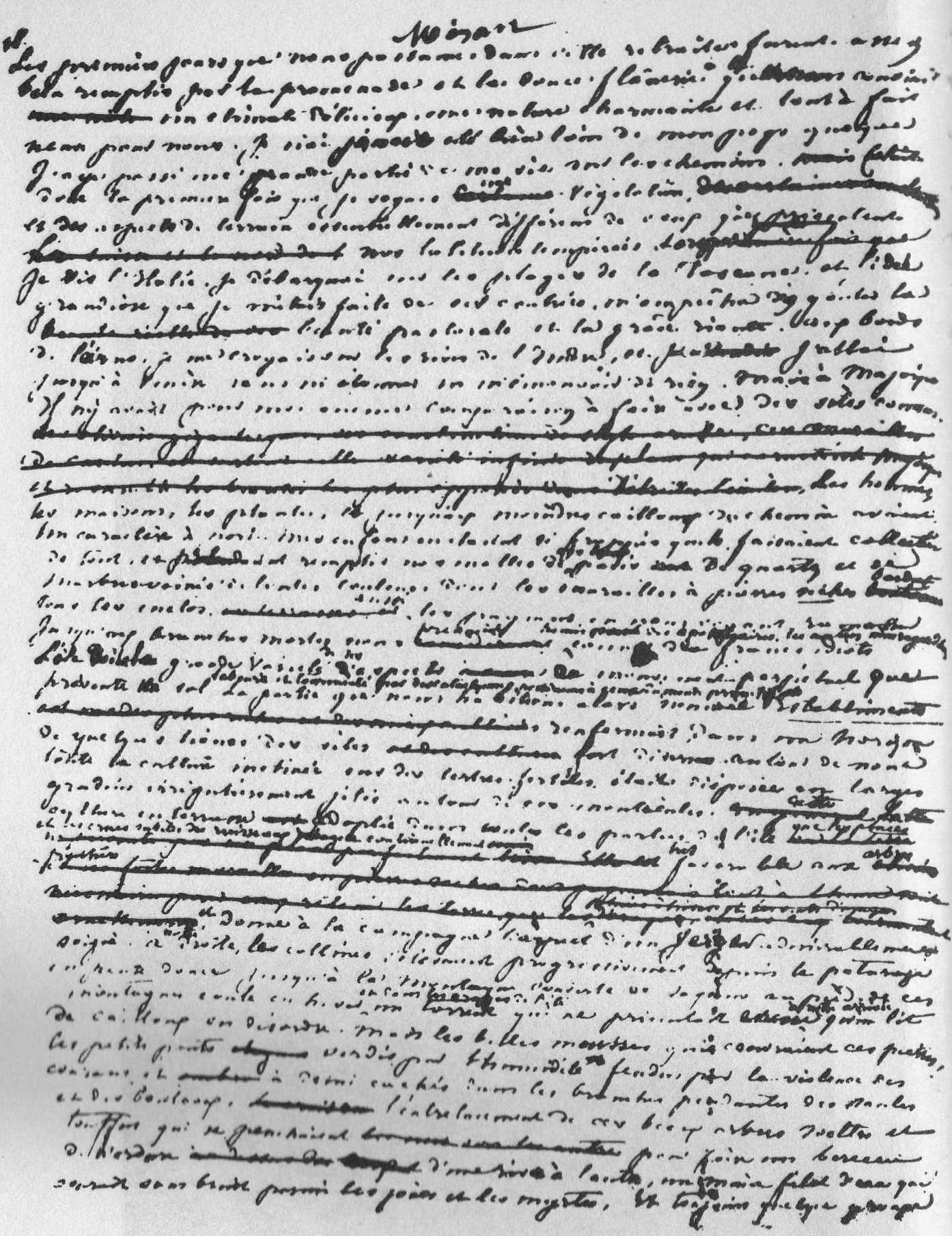
Manuscript page of the novel.

A Winter in Majorca (whose original title in French is Un hiver à Majorque) is an autobiographical travelogue written by George Sand, at the time in a relationship with Frédéric Chopin. Although published in 1842, it appeared for the first time in 1841 in the Revue des deux Mondes.

In it, Sand relates the details of her trip and stay with Chopin on the island of Majorca, due to the illness of the pianist. Sand, Chopin, and Sand's two children stayed in the Valldemossa Charterhouse for a few months, from the end of 1838 until February 1839, during which time they hoped that Chopin's tuberculosis would improve. However, the winter was hard and his health did not improve and so they soon returned to Barcelona and eventually to Marseille and then Paris.

Sand stretches the genre of autobiographical travelogue toward a more literary work, relating the experience of men and women, the experience of nature, and the experience of oneself during her encounter with the island of Majorca. Clearly irritated by the material conditions of this voyage, Sand expresses her clear intolerance towards the islanders, as many commentators, such as the writer Llorenç Villalonga, would later point out.

== Travelogue as literary genre ==
At the time of writing Un hiver à Majorque, the genre of the travelogue was in full development. The first works of George Sand, Voyage en Auvergne and the unfinished Voyage en Espagne, were already travelogues. She had written Lettres d'un voyageur a few years before, a work which she nodded to in the preface of Un hiver by describing it as a "Letter from an ex-traveler to a settled friend".

The travelogue is a flexible genre, and Un hiver is also the analysis of a political situation. Since 1835 George Sand had been looking for a political system capable of improving human life. She is interested in the person and ideas of Michel de Bourges, the socialist theories of Pierre Leroux and those of Claude-Henri de Rouvroy de Saint-Simon, among others. Saint-Simon's work described the importance of the economy, a recurring theme in Un hiver. Sand's humanitarian ideal is developed clumsily in Un hiver, but will be further developed in her later novel Consuelo. In 1833, the Spanish reign of Isabella II began, characterized by political tensions, a strong military power, and no major economic difficulties. Liberal progressivism gradually established itself under the direction of Espartero. When George Sand arrived in Majorca, the writer's lessons praising free enterprise were a little excessive, but in line with her concern for social justice, efficiency and the fair distribution of wealth. She wrote, "[t]he Majorcans are not yet ripe enough for a revolution". These reflections were her inspiration, however, and her dialogue in an "Inquisition convent" conveys a more open understanding of the island's realities and perspectives.

As a literary work Un hiver relates the experience of the men and women she met on the island, the experience of nature and the experience of herself. As a conduit for the experience of the inhabitants the novel is a failure: steeped in the ideas of the French Revolution and the Enlightenment, George Sand did not understand the Majorcans. She shows arrogance and disdain for their traditions as well as for their daily life. Sand relates that the experience of nature gave her a strong creative energy, which Chopin apparently also experienced. However, she would write Un hiver later, after her return to France, piqued by the publication of a Majorca travelogue written by Jean-Joseph Bonaventure Laurens. When relating her experience of herself, Sand blurred or erased everything concerning her life with Chopin; departing from the autobiographical genre. Rather, she relates her inner experience, consisting of solitude in a sublime landscape. She addresses the nature of religious experience, drawing on the ideas of Manuel Marliani. She reflects on the demands of household chores, describing all the logistics and all the effort they require.

== Intolerance and revenge ==
Sand espoused freedom and progress, values she represented for her admirers and supporters.

However, in this work Sand delivers a full-throated attack on the Majorcans. Her mood reflected in part the hostile attitude of the natives towards a foreign and free woman. But she does not hesitate to refer to the Majorcans as monkeys:

Nous avions surnommé Majorque l’île des Singes, parce que, nous voyant environnés de ces bêtes sournoises, pillardes et pourtant innocentes, nous nous étions habitués à nous préserver d’elles sans plus de rancune et de dépit que n’en causent aux Indiens les jockos et les orangs espiègles et fuyards.

We had nicknamed Majorca the Island of Monkeys, because, seeing ourselves surrounded by these sly, plundering and yet innocent beasts, we had become accustomed to protecting ourselves from them without any more rancor and spite than the mischievous and fugitive jockos and orangs cause the Indians.

— George Sand, Un hiver au midi de l'Europ

Sand tells the reader that they initially wanted to write a story, but ultimately delivered "personal impressions". Sand's haughty attitude towards the Spanish is constant:

quand nous fuyons le foyer d’action pour chercher l’oubli et le repos chez quelque peuple à la marche plus lente et à l’esprit moins ardent que nous, [...]

When we flee from the center of action to seek oblivion and rest among some people whose march is slower and whose spirit is less ardent than ours, [...]

— George Sand, Un hiver au midi de l'Europ

Sand constantly reproaches them for their religious feelings, and expresses antisemitism:

le juif est inexorable, mais patient. Il fait des concessions, il affecte une grande tolérance, il donne du temps, car il poursuit son but avec un génie diabolique: dès qu’il a mis sa griffe sur une propriété, il faut que pièce à pièce elle vienne toute à lui, et son intérêt est de se rendre nécessaire jusqu’à ce que la dette ait atteint la valeur du capital. Dans vingt ans il n’y aura plus de seigneurie à Majorque. Les juifs pourront s’y constituer à l’état de puissance, comme ils ont fait chez nous, [...]

The Jew is inexorable, but patient. He makes concessions, he affects great tolerance, he gives time, because he pursues his goal with a diabolical genius: as soon as he has put his claw on a property, it must come to him piece by piece, and his interest is to make himself necessary until the debt has reached the value of the capital. In twenty years there will be no more lordship in Majorca. The Jews will be able to establish themselves there in the state of power, as they have done among us, [...]

— George Sand, Un hiver au midi de l'Europ

The Spanish reaction was strong, sometimes full of lies and slander. Spanish critics reproached her for not having been able to fit into their environment, and for wanting revenge—which is indeed reflected in her correspondence. Her detractors claimed that since she was able to appreciate and describe the charms of the Valldemossa Charterhouse, where she stayed, in high literary style, she could have written equally well of those who built it and of the spiritual motivation for its construction; instead of referring to the values of the French Revolution, machines and hard work.

The work triggered Parisian mockery against Majorca. For example, in Un hiver Sand related an anecdote from a neighbor about Majorcans singing Ave Marias to their pigs, which apparently amused Parisians and offended Majorcans. Georges Lubin, Sand's editor, then argued that Marjorcan offense at this anecdote showed they lacked wit.

Finally, Robert Graves, the English translator of the work, raises the question of the strange description of Chopin in this text. Was Chopin really as ill as George Sand describes him? Testimonies collected elsewhere seem to indicate he was not. Is the fact that Chopin is never explicitly named justified solely by questions of modesty, or was Sand deliberately foregrounding herself? Chopin, referred to only as "the sick man" (or "our sick man"), suffering from tuberculosis, coughs up blood, which frightens and worries the islanders. But then Sand appears to deny the severity and even existence of Chopin's disease:

Mais l’autre, loin de prospérer avec l’air humide et les privations, dépérissait d’une manière effrayante. Quoiqu’il fût condamné par toute la faculté de Palma, il n’avait aucune affection chronique; [...]

But the other, far from thriving with the damp air and privations, was wasting away in a frightful manner. Although he was condemned by all the faculty of Palma, he had no chronic affection; [...]

— George Sand, Un hiver au midi de l'Europ

== Summary ==
Consistent with her male pen name identity, Sand portrays the entire visit as if she were a male friend of Chopin's. In the winter of 1838, the author takes the boat to Majorca and docks at Palma, accompanied by Sand's children and Frédéric Chopin, seriously ill. They stay in the city, then at the Cartoixa de Valldemossa. Sand writes that the food is expensive, contains too much pork, and that the peasants are unpleasant and dishonest. Sand complains about the smell of poor quality olive oil.

The author discovers and recognizes the architectural and natural beauties of the island, which, however, do not always resemble how they were described in the books Sand had read. The author proposes that "[t]he character of a people is revealed in its costume and furnishings, as well as in its features and language" and concludes the absence of any "intellectual life" in the Majorcan.

Sand claims that the absence of hardship has made Majorcans lazy:

Quand on se demande à quoi un riche Majorquin peut dépenser son revenu dans un pays où il n’y a ni luxe ni tentations d’aucun genre, on ne se l’explique qu’en voyant sa maison pleine de sales fainéants des deux sexes, qui occupent une portion des bâtiments réservée à cet usage, et qui, dès qu’ils ont passé une année au service du maître, ont droit pour toute leur vie au logement, à l’habillement et à la nourriture.

When one wonders what a rich Majorcan can spend his income on in a country where there are neither luxuries nor temptations of any kind, one can only explain it by seeing his house full of dirty idlers of both sexes, who occupy a portion of the buildings reserved for that purpose, and who, as soon as they have spent a year in the service of the master, have a right to lodging, clothing, and food for their whole lives

— George Sand, Un hiver au midi de l'Europ

Agriculture is no less backward there than in some French regions, but, for George Sand, the Majorcan peasant is incredibly poor, soft and slow:

Dans nos provinces du centre, où l’agriculture est le plus arriérée, l’usage du cultivateur ne prouve rien autre chose que son obstination et son ignorance. À plus forte raison en est-il ainsi à Majorque, où l’agriculture, bien que fort minutieusement soignée, est à l’état d’enfance. Nulle part je n’ai vu travailler la terre si patiemment et si mollement. Les machines les plus simples sont inconnues; les bras de l’homme, bras fort maigres et fort débiles, comparativement aux nôtres, suffisent à tout, mais avec une lenteur inouïe.

In our central provinces, where agriculture is most backward, the practice of the farmer proves nothing but his obstinacy and ignorance. Even more so in Majorca, where agriculture, although very meticulously cared for, is in its infancy. Nowhere have I seen the land worked so patiently and so feebly. The simplest machines are unknown; the arms of man, arms very thin and very weak compared to ours, are sufficient for everything, but with an unheard-of slowness.

— George Sand, Un hiver au midi de l'Europ

In the spring of 1839 they return on the Méléagre, from Barcelona to France, feeling liberated:

Dans nos provinces du centre, où l’agriculture est le plus arriérée, l’usage du cultivateur ne prouve rien autre chose que son obstination et son ignorance. À plus forte raison en est-il ainsi à Majorque, où l’agriculture, bien que fort minutieusement soignée, est à l’état d’enfance. Nulle part je n’ai vu travailler la terre si patiemment et si mollement. Les machines les plus simples sont inconnues; les bras de l’homme, bras fort maigres et fort débiles, comparativement aux nôtres, suffisent à tout, mais avec une lenteur inouïe.

In our central provinces, where agriculture is most backward, the farmer’s methods demonstrate nothing but his obstinacy and ignorance. This is even more true in Mallorca, where agriculture—despite being tended with great meticulousness—remains in its infancy. Nowhere else have I seen the land worked with such patience and such lethargy. The simplest machines are unknown; human arms—arms very thin and feeble compared to ours—suffice for every task, yet with incredible slowness.

— George Sand, Un hiver au midi de l'Europ

== Adaptations ==
In 1969, Jaime Camino adapted the novel in the film Jutrzenka - Un invierno en Mallorca with Lucía Bosé playing Sand and Chris Sandford playing Chopin. In 2013, Román Piña published the novel El general y la musa (The General and the Muse), a fable about Sand and Chopin in Valdemosa.

== See also ==
- George Sand
- Frédéric Chopin
- Valldemossa Charterhouse
- Prélude, op. 28, no. 15 (Chopin), known as the "Raindrop" prelude, composed at the Valldemossa Charterhouse during this winter in Majorca.
- Lettres de Chopin et de George Sand, including about ten written in Majorca or Valldemossa.

== Sources ==
- "Sand, George", La Enciclopedia (in Spanish), vol. 18 (1ª ed.), Madrid: Salvat-El País Editores, 2003, ISBN 84-345-7482-9
- Maier, Hennes (1990), Editorial Salvat (ed.), Con George Sand y Chopin en Mallorca (in Spanish), Barcelona, ISBN 84-345-5233-7
- Pellicer, Estanislao (1993), El Tall (ed.), Chopin en Mallorca (in Spanish), Palma de Mallorca, ISBN 84-87685-26-9
- Sand, George (1804-1876) Auteur du texte (1842–1844), Oeuvres de George Sand.... Un hiver au midi de l'Europe. Valentine. Lettres d'un voyageur. Horace. L'Uscoque
