= Scherzo No. 3 (Chopin) =

Art piece by Chopin

Scherzo No. 3 in C♯ minor
performed by Alice Gi-Young Hwang

Scherzo No. 3 in C♯ minor
performed by La Pianista

The Scherzo No. 3, Op. 39, in C♯ minor by Frédéric Chopin. He began composing it 1838 in the abandoned monastery of Valldemossa on the Balearic island of Mallorca, Spain, and completed it back in France by the end of 1839. This is the most terse, ironic, and tightly constructed of the four scherzi, with an almost Beethovenian grandeur.

Frédéric Chopin dedicated this composition to one of his closest pupils, Adolphe Gutmann.

== Structure ==
The piece begins in the key of C♯ minor, then moves to D♭ major, and returns to C♯ minor, concluding with a Picardy third. The composition opens with an almost Lisztian introduction, leading to a subject in octaves of pent-up energy. The key changes to D♭ major, with a chorale-like subject, interspersed with delicate falling arpeggios. Louis Kentner thinks of it as "a Wagnerian melody of astonishing beauty, recalling the sound of tubas, harps and all the apocalyptic orchestra of Valhalla."

It begins with an introduction progressing into the fierce main theme. This is particularly difficult to perform, due to the technique needed to accurately and quickly execute the running octave patterns. The scherzo then moves into a transition section that leads back to the main theme. The following, singing style (cantabile) section is in D♭ major. The main theme and its sequences begin with strong chords that hold the melody followed by a downward flutter of notes. There follows a brief section consisting of a series of arpeggi. The elements of this lyrical section repeat themselves a few times and the piece then moves back into the main theme.
