= Nahre Sol =

American composer, pianist and YouTuber

- Born: 1991 (age 34–35)
- Education: Juilliard School; The Glenn Gould School
- Occupations: Composer; pianist

YouTube information
- Channel: Nahre Sol
- Years active: 2017–present
- Genres: Music; education
- Subscribers: 827 thousand
- Views: 85.4 million
- Last updated: March 5, 2026
- Website: nahresol.com

Nahre Sol Hwang, is an American composer, pianist, and YouTuber.

== Early life and education ==
Nahre Sol received her Bachelor of Music degree in piano performance from the Juilliard School in 2013, studying with Matti Raekallio. While at Juilliard, she co-founded the T.R.I.O. Project (Teaching and Responding Through Internet Outreach).

She was a 2013 recipient of a France Harriet Hale Woolley Award in the Arts Grant, allowing her to study in Paris with Gabriel Tacchino and Narcís Bonet i Armengol, pupils of Francis Poulenc and Nadia Boulanger.

In 2015, she earned her artist diploma from The Glenn Gould School of The Royal Conservatory of Music in Toronto, Canada, studying with John O'Conor. In Toronto, she was co-director of the chamber music collective Happenstance. From 2017 to 2018, she was a New Music Fellow at the RCM. She also participated in master classes at the International Mendelssohn-Academy Leipzig and at the International Holland Music Sessions as a scholarship recipient.

She also contributed a set of recordings of the Chopin Scherzos to Musopen's compilation of Chopin's works, which were released under a public domain license.

== Recognition as Nahre Sol ==
After graduating from the Glenn Gould School, Nahre Sol abandoned her traditional piano performance career, working for some time as a commercial photographer. She resumed her musical activities through a series of videos on YouTube under the title Practice Notes using the name Nahre Sol, a nickname her father used to call her.

Nahre Sol is best known for her YouTube channel, with around 710,000 subscribers as of April 2024, and as being co-host of the PBS Digital Studios show "Sound Field". She has also been a guest host of MPR's Performance Today, created a video for Wired magazine, appeared as a guest on the online channel Physics Girl, and collaborated with other composers and musicians such as David Bruce, Andrew Huang, Adam Neely, L.A. Buckner, Tantacrul, and Ben Levin. She was nominated in the category Best YouTube Musician in the 12th Annual Shorty Awards in 2020. The blog Pianote featured her YouTube channel in 2021 as #1 on their list of top YouTube pianists. She was a guest artist at the 2018 Costa Rica Piano Festival.

As a composer, Nahre Sol has had works commissioned by the Manitoba Chamber Orchestra and her music was used in the film The Boss Baby: Family Business. In 2021, she released a digital album called Alice in Wonderland. In June 2023, the Elbphilharmonie in Hamburg announced Nahre Sol as its first-ever 'Creator in Residence' for the 2023-2024 season.

== Competitions and awards ==
Sol was the Gold Medal Winner of the NFAA YoungARTS program, a semi-finalist of the Presidential Scholars in the Arts Program, recipient of the Sarra and Emmanuil Senderov Award at Arizona State University for the “Most outstanding performance of a piece by a Russian composer” at the 3rd Schimmel USASU International Piano Competition, and won prizes at the “Tomorrow’s Stars” Competition held by the Orange County Performing Arts Center, the Spotlight Awards, the Idyllwild Arts Academy Concerto Competition, the Steinway Society of Redlands Piano Competition, the Young Artists Peninsula Music Festival, the Redlands Bowl Young Artists Auditions, the MTAC State Concerto Competition, and the 2008 Bronislaw Kaper Awards for Young Artists, She also was a contestant in such competitions as the William Kapell International Piano Competition and the 2015 National Chopin Competition in Miami, Florida.
