= Antonio Despuig y Dameto =

- Archbishop of Seville
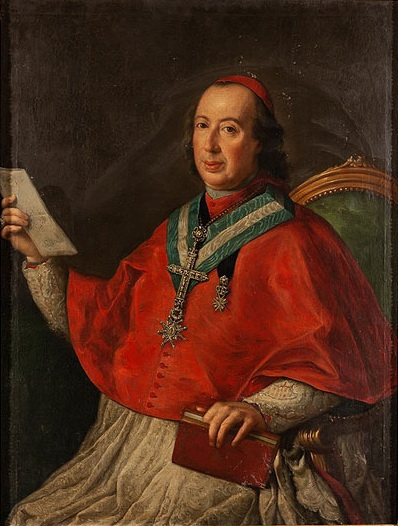
- Antonio Despuig by Agustín Esteve
- Native name: Antoni Despuig i Dameto
- Church: Catholic Church
- Archdiocese: Archdiocese of Seville
- In office: 18 December 1795 – 23 March 1799
- Predecessor: Alonso Marcos de Llanes Argüelles
- Successor: Luis María de Borbón y Vallabriga
- Other posts: Cardinal-Priest of San Callisto (1803-1813); Patriarch of Antioch (1799-1813); Archpriest of Santa Maria Maggiore (1803-1813)
- Previous posts: Archbishop of Valencia (1795); Bishop of Orihuela (1791-1795)

Orders
- Ordination: 3 July 1774
- Consecration: 29 September 1791 by Francesco Saverio de Zelada
- Created cardinal: 11 July 1803 by Pope Pius VII

Personal details
- Born: 30 March 1745 Palma de Mallorca, Balearic Islands, Kingdom of Spain
- Died: 2 May 1813 (aged 68) Lucca, Principality of Lucca and Piombino, French Empire

Antonio Despuig y Dameto (30 March 1745 – 2 May 1813) was a Spanish archbishop and cardinal. He was Archbishop of Seville from 1795 to 1799 and was a big supporter of the beatification of the Mallorquín nun Catalina Tomas which was finally achieved on 12 August 1792 when pope Pius VI beatified her. He then became Latin Patriarch of Antioch in 1799 and was made cardinal by pope Pius VII. He died in Lucca in 1813.

== Bibliography ==
- "bishop/bdespuig". Catholic-Hierarchy.org. David M. Cheney.
- Gaetano Moroni – Dizionario di erudizione storico ecclesiastica. Vol. 19º anno 1843.
- Savini Nicci “Il Patriziato Sabino, il Collegio e l'Istituto Sabino per gli studi” (Archivio Vaticano).
- S.S Pio VII “Motu Proprio” del 6 dicembre 1800.
- Cardinale Giovanni Andrea Archetti “Decreto Esecutoriale” del 20 dicembre 1800.

Catholic Church titles
Preceded by Alonso Marcos de Llanes Argüelles	Archbishop of Seville; 1795–1799	Succeeded by Luis María de Borbón y Vallabriga, 14th Count of Chinchón
Unknown	Latin Patriarch of Antioch; 1799–1813	Succeeded by vacant until 1822
