= Adolphe Gutmann =

German pianist and composer

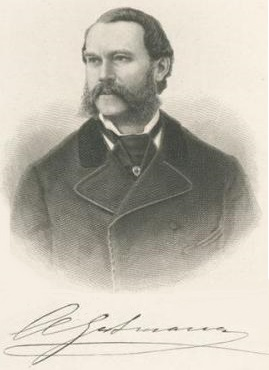
Lithography and signature of Adolphe Gutmann around 1879.

Adolphe Gutmann (originally Wilhelm Adolf Gutmann) (12 January 1819 – 22 October 1882) was a German pianist and composer who was a pupil and friend of Frédéric Chopin and Franz Liszt.

== Life ==
Gutmann was born in Heidelberg. He came to Paris in 1834, at the age of 15, to study with Chopin, becoming one of the composer's favourites. He performed in concert with Chopin, Liszt, Charles-Valentin Alkan and Pierre-Joseph Zimmerman, Alkan's transcription of part of Beethoven's Seventh Symphony at a concert of 1838. Gutmann was also the dedicatee of Chopin's Scherzo, Op. 39, published in 1839.

Gutmann acted as copyist for a number of Chopin's works (amongst other the Sonata in B-flat minor), and acted as a courier to take Chopin's letters to his family in Warsaw. Gutmann's own set of Etudes (his Op. 12) is dedicated to Chopin. Over time, he went from being Chopin’s favourite pupil to his favourite friend, and even a sort of protector. He looked after the composer, was present at Chopin's death bed, preserved the glass from which Chopin took his last drink of water, massaged his hands as he lay on his deathbed, supported him, and it was Gutmann whom Chopin kissed last. Both he and Alkan were bequeathed the notes that Chopin had compiled in preparation for a piano teaching method.

During the summers of 1855 and 1856, he was a guest of George Sand at Nohant, who, like Chopin before her, referred to him as ‘her child’. Thanks to the fortune he had amassed through his concerts and lessons, he bought a property in Le Vésinet in 1858, then moved to Florence in 1871, where he acquired a villa.

His name appears twice, just below that of the piano maker Pierre Érard, in the first register of pederasts kept by the Paris Police Prefecture, along with his address, 4 Rue Blanche, details of his homoerotic activities, and the date of observation given in brackets: 1847. Later, in Florence, he was a close friend or had a romantic relationship with the journalist Giulio Piccini (alias Jarro). Gutmann died in La Spezia.

== Works ==
Inspired by the style of his master, Gutmann is the author of several nocturnes, and twelve studies, studies characteristics that seem to announce the coming of Impressionism (two of his studies are called Sea, and The Storm, and are respective replicas of the study No. 1, Op. 25, by Chopin, and the Révolutionnaire). All his works were quite popular in their time, particularly the cycle The seasons, but faded thereafter.

- Nocturne Lyrique
- Dix Etudes, Op. 12
- Nocturne No.7, Op.20
- Deux Nocturnes, Op.8
- Deux Nocturnes, Op.16
- Notturno grazioso, Op.51
- Die Jahreszeiten, Op. 53
