= Catherine of Palma =

Spanish religious (1531–1574)

Saint Catherine of Palma
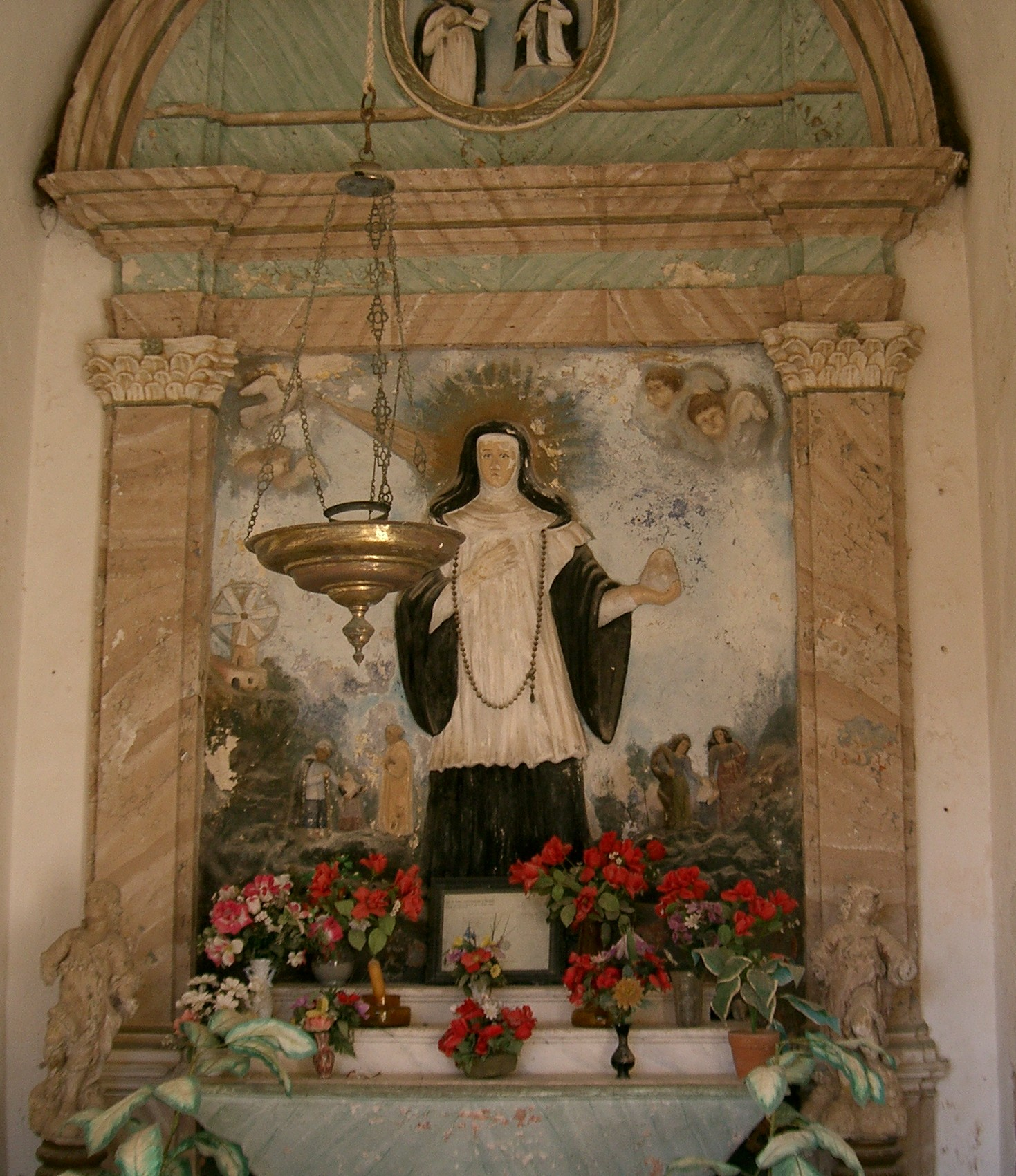
- Anonymous 18th-century altarpiece showing St Catherine, in a chapel at Valldemossa, Mallorca
- Born: Catalina Thomás; 1 May 1531; Valldemossa, Mallorca, Spain
- Died: 5 April 1574; Palma, Mallorca, Spain
- Beatified: 12 August 1792 by Pope Pius VI
- Canonized: 22 June 1930, Rome, Saint Peter's Basilica by Pope Pius XI
- Major shrine: Saint Mary Magdalen's Church in Palma on Plaça Santa Magdalena (incorrupt body)
- Feast: primarily 5 April; 27–28 July in Valldemossa
- Attributes: habit and rochet as used by Augustinian Canonesses
- Patronage: Mallorca

Catherine of Palma (1531–1574, born Catalina Tomàs i Gallard) was a Spanish canon and mystic from Mallorca. She is venerated as a saint in the Roman Catholic Church and her feast day is commonly celebrated on 5 April although in her home town of Valldemossa she is remembered on the 27 and 28 of July.

== Life ==
Catalina was born 1 May 1531 at Valldemossa, Mallorca, Spain, in a peasant family as the sixth of seven children. She was named after her maternal grandmother and the saint Catherine of Alexandria who was especially venerated by the family. As Catalina's parents died while she was still a young child, she spent her early formative years with her grandparents close to the Valldemossa Charterhouse before, at the age of ten, moving in with relatives who were owners of the estate of Son Gallard in 1541. Here she helped the workers on the fields and tended to the flock which is why she is also often depicted as a young farmer. Catalina's spirituality and her growing desire for religious life clashed with the ideas her family had for her, leading to some years of tribulation in which some saints, including Bruno of Cologne, Catherine of Alexandria and Anthony the Abbot, appeared and comforted her.

Finally, with the help of Antonio Castañeda, a famous hermit who had been a soldier in the army of Charles V, she was able to leave her family in 1550 and took up work at the Zaforteza Tagamanent family in Palma before joining the Canonesses of St Augustine at the convent of St Mary Magdalene in Palma on 13 November 1552. She became renown for her sanctity and was esteemed for her advice both by important people like bishops as well as the poor. According to legend, she was visited by devils and angels, and went into ecstasy for the last years of her life. She died 5 April 1574 at Palma, Mallorca, of natural causes. As of 1904 her hat, thimble, and other relics were kept, and her body preserved in a marble sarcophagus, in the convent of St Mary Magdalene, Palma.

== Veneration ==
After her death she was celebrated locally as a saint for half a century until a decree of Pope Urban VII forbade the veneration of unrecognised saints. Local people, among them the bishop Antonio Despuig y Dameto, appealed to Rome and eventually she was beatified on 12 August 1792 by Pope Pius VI and canonised on 22 June 1930 by Pope Pius XI. She is commemorated on 1 April, and on 27 and 28 July in her home town of Valldemossa.

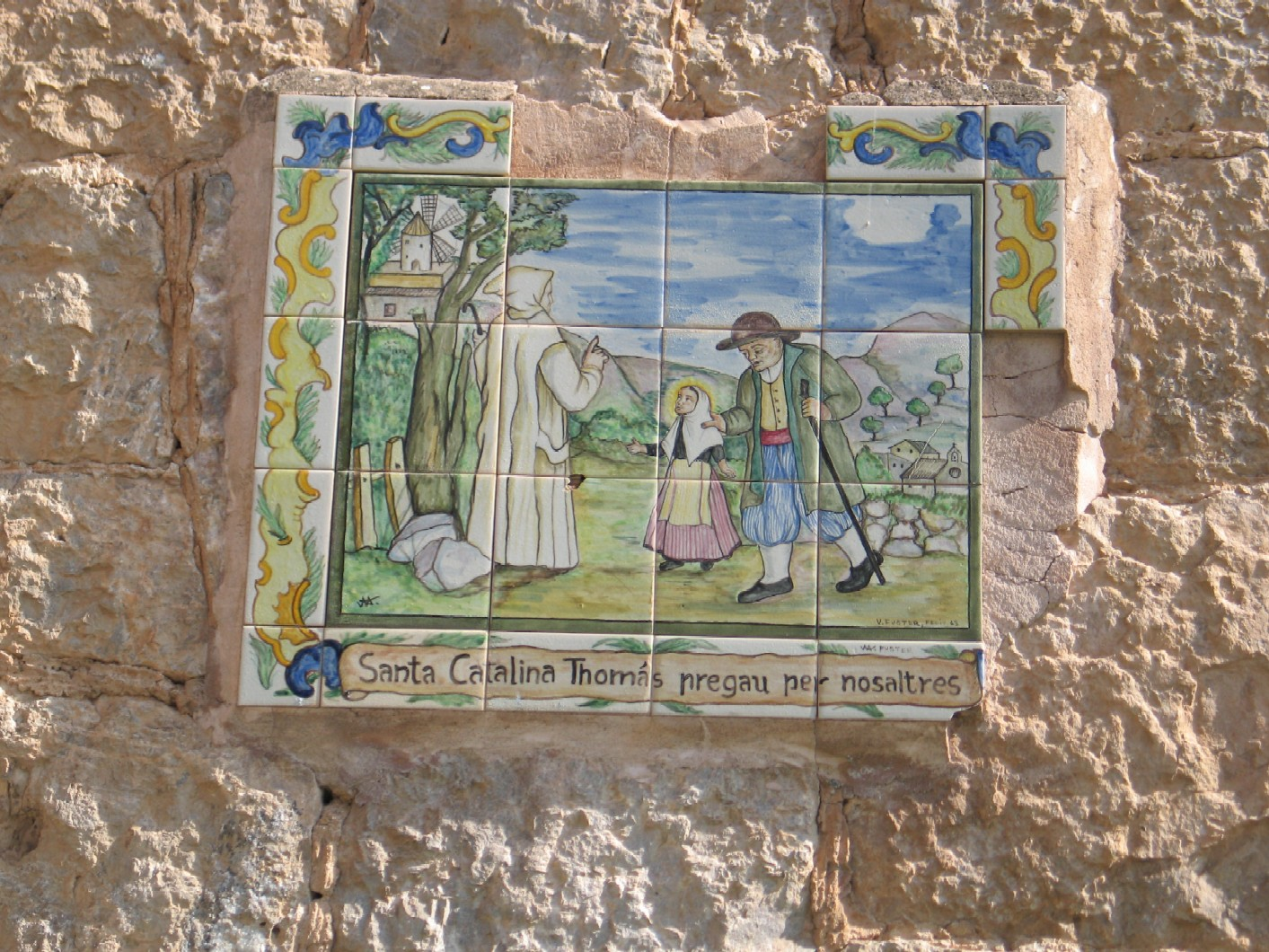
Plaque commemorating the saint

The house in Valldemossa where she was born, Carrer Rectoria 5, has become a shrine, and many houses in the village bear a plaque in her honour. The only writings of her that remain are two letters to the priest Vicente Mas and there are some Mallorquín folk songs about her life.

She is considered as one of the patron saints of Mallorca, along with Sebastian, Alphonsus Rodriguez and the Virgen de Lluc of the Santuari de Lluc.

== Names ==
Spellings of her names found in sources include Catalina, Caterina, Cathalina and Catherine, and Thomas, Thomás, Tomas, Tomàs Gallard, and Tomàs i Gallard. She is also called Sor Tomassa or Sor Tomaseta (sor meaning sister in Catalan).
