= Scherzo =

Classical musical form

A scherzo (/ˈskɛərtsoʊ/, UK also /ˈskɜːrt-/, Italian: [ˈskertso]; plural scherzos or scherzi), in western classical music, is a short composition – sometimes a movement from a larger work such as a symphony or a sonata. The precise definition has varied over the years, but scherzo often refers to a movement that replaces the minuet as the third movement in a four-movement work, such as a symphony, sonata, or string quartet. The term can also refer to a fast-moving humorous composition that may or may not be part of a larger work.

== Origins ==
The Italian word scherzo means "joke" or "jest". More rarely, the similar-meaning word “badinerie” (also spelled battinerie; from French, "jesting") has been used. Sometimes the word scherzando ("joking") is used in musical notation to indicate that a passage should be executed in a playful manner. An early use of the word scherzo in music is in light-hearted madrigals of the early baroque period, which were often called scherzi musicali, for example:

- Claudio Monteverdi wrote two sets of works with this title, in 1607 and in 1632.
- Antonio Brunelli wrote Scherzi, Arie, Canzonette e Madrigale for voices and instruments in 1616.
- Johann Baptist Schenk wrote Scherzi musicale (fourteen suites for gamba and continuo).

Later, composers applied the term scherzo (plural scherzos or scherzi) and sometimes badinerie to certain instrumental works in fast tempos in duple meter time signature, for example:

- The scherzo of Johann Sebastian Bach's Partita No. 3 for keyboard.

7. Badinerie
J. S. Bach, Suite No. 2 in B minor, BWV 1067

- The best-known "Badinerie" is the final movement of Bach's Orchestral Suite No. 2 in B minor.
- Badineries in French ouvertures by Christoph Graupner and Georg Philipp Telemann.

The scherzo, as most commonly known today, developed from the minuet and trio, and gradually came to replace it as the third (sometimes second) movement in symphonies, string quartets, sonatas, and similar works. It traditionally retains the triple meter time signature and ternary form of the minuet, but is considerably quicker. It is often, but not always, of a light-hearted nature.

The main features include a 6/8 bar melody with one beat per bar feel.

== Form ==
The scherzo itself is a rounded binary form, but, like the minuet, is usually played with the accompanying trio followed by a repeat of the scherzo, creating the ABA or ternary form. This is sometimes done twice or more (ABABA). The "B" theme is a trio, a contrasting section not necessarily for only three instruments, as was often the case with the second minuet of classical suites (the first Brandenburg Concerto has a famous example). In some cases the scherzo is in sonata form, for example the third movement of Brahms's Fourth Symphony in E Minor.

== Appearance/examples in compositions ==
Scherzos occasionally differ from this traditional structure in various ways.

- Some examples are not in the customary triple meter—for example, the scherzo of Tchaikovsky's Fourth Symphony, which is in 2/4 time; or the trio section of the scherzo from his Second Symphony which is in 2/8 time. Another example is Beethoven's Piano Sonata No. 18. This example is also unusual in being written in orthodox sonata form rather than the usual ternary form for such a movement, and thus it lacks a trio section. This sonata is also unusual in that the scherzo is followed by a minuet and trio movement—whereas most sonatas have either a scherzo movement or a minuet movement, but not both. Some analysts have attempted to account for these irregularities by analyzing the scherzo as the sonata's slow movement, which is rather fast. That would keep the traditional structure for a four-movement sonata that Beethoven usually followed, especially in the first half of his piano sonatas.
- Joseph Haydn wrote minuets that are close to scherzi in tone — but it was Ludwig van Beethoven and Franz Schubert who first used scherzi widely, with Beethoven in particular turning the polite rhythm of the minuet into a much more intense – and sometimes even savage – dance. Although in 1781, Haydn replaced menuets with scherzi in all of his 6 String Quartets, Op. 33.

The scherzo remained a standard movement in the symphony and related forms through the 19th century and beyond. Composers also began to write scherzi as pieces in themselves, stretching the boundaries of the form.

- The first three of Frédéric Chopin's four well-known scherzos for the piano are especially dark, with an intense energy, and hardly come off as jokes. Robert Schumann remarked of them, "How is 'gravity' to clothe itself if 'jest' goes about in dark veils?" Chopin's four scherzos are written as single movements, on an unprecedented large scale going beyond the previous Beethovenian model of classical multi-movement works.
- In a letter, Brahms referred to the scherzo from his Second Piano Concerto as a "little wisp of a scherzo", in one of his typically sarcastic remarks, as it is a heavyweight movement.
- Other examples; the second movement of Shostakovich's Symphony No. 10, the second (sometimes third) movement of Mahler's Symphony No. 6, Felix Mendelssohn's composition for A Midsummer Night's Dream between act 1 and 2, and in several of Bruckner's symphonies.

In present-day compositions, the scherzo has also made appearances.

- Australian composer Julian Cochran wrote extensively for the form, with four scherzi for piano and two grand scherzi for symphony orchestra.
- The soundtrack release of John Williams' film score for Star Wars: The Force Awakens (2015) includes a track titled "Scherzo for X-Wings" which follows the typical scherzo rounded binary form and presents itself in a 6/8 time. Williams had previously composed "Scherzo for Motorcycle and Orchestra" for the film score of Indiana Jones and the Last Crusade (1989) and in 1985 the Scherzo for Today for NBC's The Today Show.
