= Valldemossa =

- Municipality
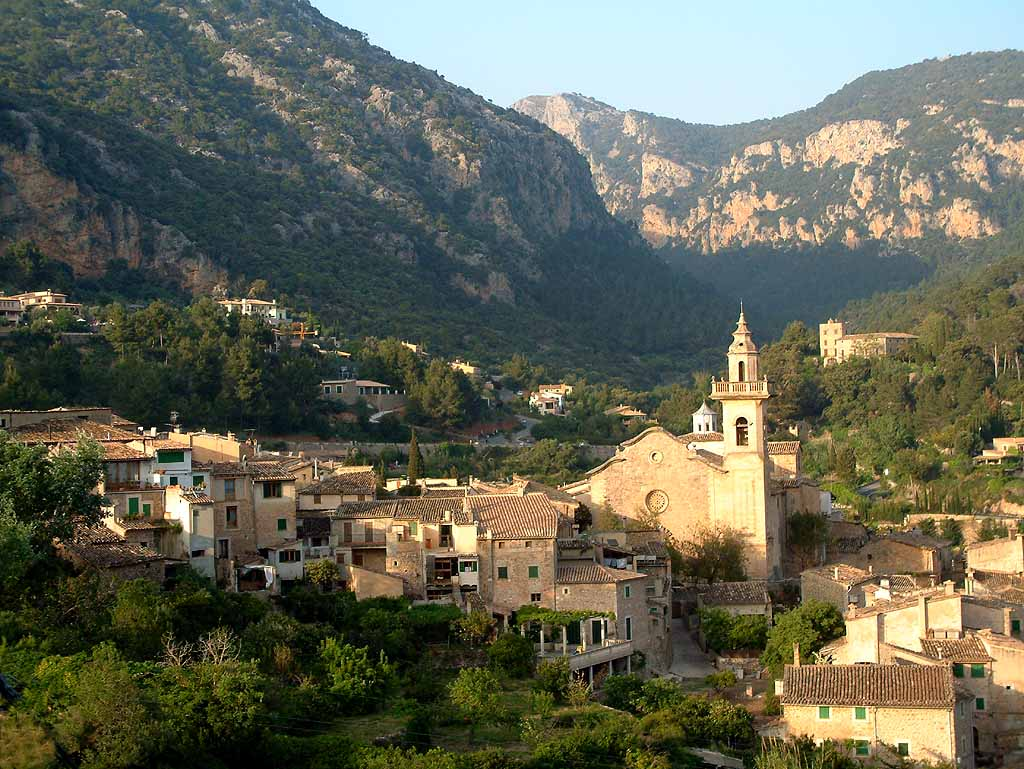

- Coat of arms

- Map of Valledemossa in Mallorca

- Location in Mallorca Valldemossa (Balearic Islands) Valldemossa (Spain)
- Coordinates: 39°42′N 2°37′E
- Country: Spain
- Autonomous community: Balearic Islands
- Province: Balearic Islands
- Judicial district: Valldemossa
- Founded: 123 BC

Area
  - Total: 16.6 km^{2} (6.4 sq mi)
- Elevation: 499 m (1,637 ft)

Population (2025-01-01)
  - Total: 2,038
  - Density: 123/km^{2} (318/sq mi)
- Time zone: UTC+1 (CET)
  - Summer (DST): UTC+2 (CEST)
- Postal code: 7017
- Dialing code: 971
- Official language(s): Catalan, Spanish

Valldemossa (Balearic Catalan: [ˌvaʎdəˈmosə]) is a village and municipality on the island of Mallorca, part of the Spanish autonomous community of the Balearic Islands. It is famous for one landmark: the Royal Charterhouse of Valldemossa, built at the beginning of the 14th century, when the mystic and philosopher Ramon Llull lived in this area of Mallorca.

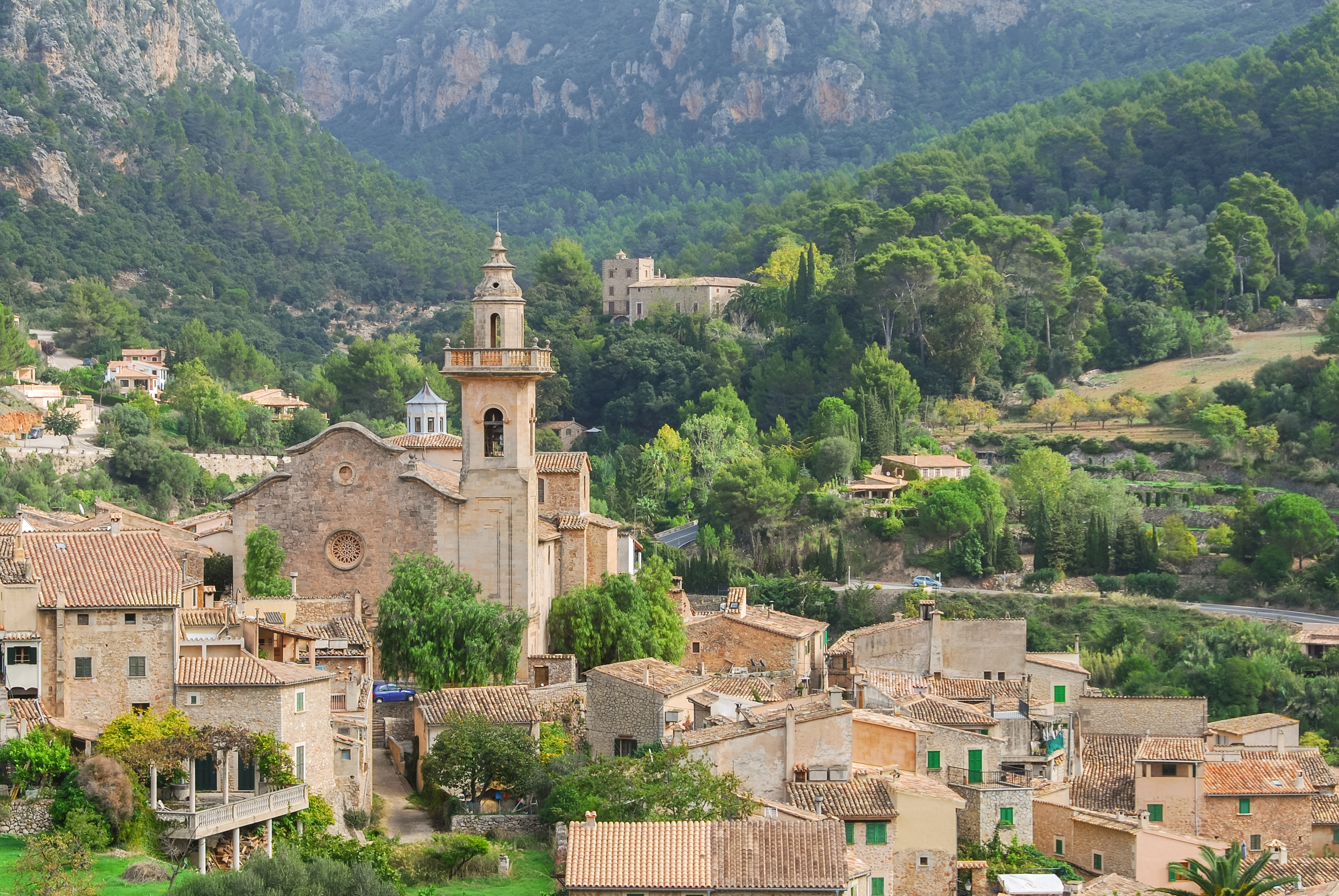
Valldemossa village centre.

Since the 19th century Valldemossa has been promoted internationally as a place of outstanding beauty, largely as a result of the affection of distinguished traveller and cultural writer, the Austrian Archduke Ludwig Salvator. Valldemossa is the birthplace of Catalina Thomas, Mallorca's patron saint.

== History ==
In the year 1399, the king of Aragon, Martin the Humane, donated his summer residence, the Royal Palace of Valdemossa, to the Carthusian Order. This order had been founded by Bruno of Cologne in 1084 and its monasteries were known as charterhouses according to its motherhouse, Chatreuse, which is why the building is called today the Valldemossa Charterhouse. The charterhouse was populated by twelve monks, a prior and several lay brothers who performed menial work around the charterhouse. Catalina Thomas, the patron saint of Mallorca, was born here in 1533. The town was pillaged by Muslim raiders in the year 1552.

In the 1830s the Spanish government confiscated monasteries and the historic estate was sold to private owners, who have since hosted some prominent guests. These have included the Polish composer Frédéric Chopin and his lover the pioneering French writer Amantine-Lucile-Aurore Dupin, better known by her pseudonym George Sand, who wrote a notable account of A Winter in Majorca, describing their 1838–39 visit and praising the island's natural beauty, but criticizing what she perceived as the prejudice and vices of the natives.

Later the Nicaraguan poet Rubén Darío was guest of the Sureda y Montaner families who own the Chartreuse estate. To fight his own nightmares Rubén Dario would sleep in monk habits; however, his drinking habits caused a rift with his private hosts and thus his departure from the former monastery and from Majorca.

Also Jorge Luis Borges lived in the town with his parents and his sister Norah, after the First World War let them free from their refuge in Geneva. Borges passionate friendship with the young artist Jacobo Sureda Montaner, son of the painter Pilar Montaner, was decisive for Borges writing mainly in Spanish.

Until the elections of 2007 the town's mayor was the only one in the democratic Kingdom of Spain to remain in office from the times of the Francoist dictatorship, which legally disappeared as the current Spanish Constitution of 1978 was passed.

== Chopin and Sand in Valldemossa ==
In October 1836, Chopin met the French writer George Sand (Aurore Dudevant) at Liszt’s house. By the summer of 1838, their relationship had become romantic. They spent the winter of 8 November 1838 to 13 February 1839 on Mallorca, accompanied by Sand’s two children. Initially based in Palma de Mallorca, they later relocated to the former Carthusian monastery in Valldemossa.

After approximately one month in Mallorca, Chopin began expressing dissatisfaction with the weather and local cuisine. Although the climate was thought to be beneficial for his health, that winter proved unusually rainy and humid, exacerbating Chopin’s respiratory illness.

Additionally, the Pleyel pianino, serial number 6668, ordered from Paris, experienced significant delays. It arrived in Marseille in early December but remained held in customs in Palma, where authorities demanded a substantial duty before its release. Consequently, Chopin was compelled to play a poorly tuned local piano for several weeks.

At long last, the piano arrived at the Valldemossa Charterhouse on 9 January 1839, about a month before their departure on 13 February. Despite the difficult conditions, Chopin completed his 24 Preludes, Op. 28 (including the famous “Raindrop” Prelude), and worked on major compositions such as the Ballade No. 2 (Op. 38), Scherzo No. 3 (Op. 39), and two Polonaises (Op. 40).

After Chopin and Sand’s departure, much of their personal furniture was reportedly burned by locals due to fears of tuberculosis. Today, cells 2 and 4 of the former monastery house museums dedicated to the couple, containing their letters, music manuscripts, portraits, sketches, and the Majorcan piano Chopin initially used. The museum also preserves a death mask of Chopin and a lock of his hair, once kept in a book by George Sand. It is privately operated and was established in 1929 by Anne‑Marie Boutroux de Ferrà and her husband Bartomeu Ferrà i Juan.

The Chopin Festival, run by the Festivals Chopin de Valldemossa, has taken place every August at the monastery since 1930.

In cell 4, authenticated as the one occupied by Chopin and Sand by musicologist Édouard Ganche in 1932 and confirmed by a court ruling in 2013, visitors can view the authentic Pleyel pianino ordered by Chopin, which arrived in Valldemossa on 9 January 1839. At the time of their departure, Chopin arranged with the Canut family to purchase the Pleyel pianino. A payment of 1,200 francs was subsequently sent to Pleyel in Paris to settle the cost of the instrument. It remained in the banker’s family and today is maintained by the Quetglas brothers, heirs of the original owner and custodians of the museum. This collection constitutes one of the world’s most significant tributes to Frédéric Chopin and George Sand, featuring invaluable historical artifacts and original manuscripts.

== Tourism ==
Valldemossa is a popular tourist destination in the Balearic Islands of Spain. One of the main attractions is the 13th century monastery, where the musician Frederic Chopin spent a winter (1838–39). The monastery was originally built as a royal palace; however, in 1399 it was converted into a monastery.

Actor Michael Douglas and actress Catherine Zeta-Jones have a coastal estate near Valldemossa.

=== Events and festivals ===
Festivals that take place in Valldemossa include:

- Festes de la Beata: takes place during July 28, celebrates the Patron Saint of Valldemossa. Many parades take place on the streets during this festival.
- Festival of Saint Bartomeu: on 24 August, also celebrates the Patron Saint. There are performances in the Cloisters of the Monastery.
- Annual Artdemossa: this festival, at the end of July, includes art and performance exhibitions.

== Gallery ==
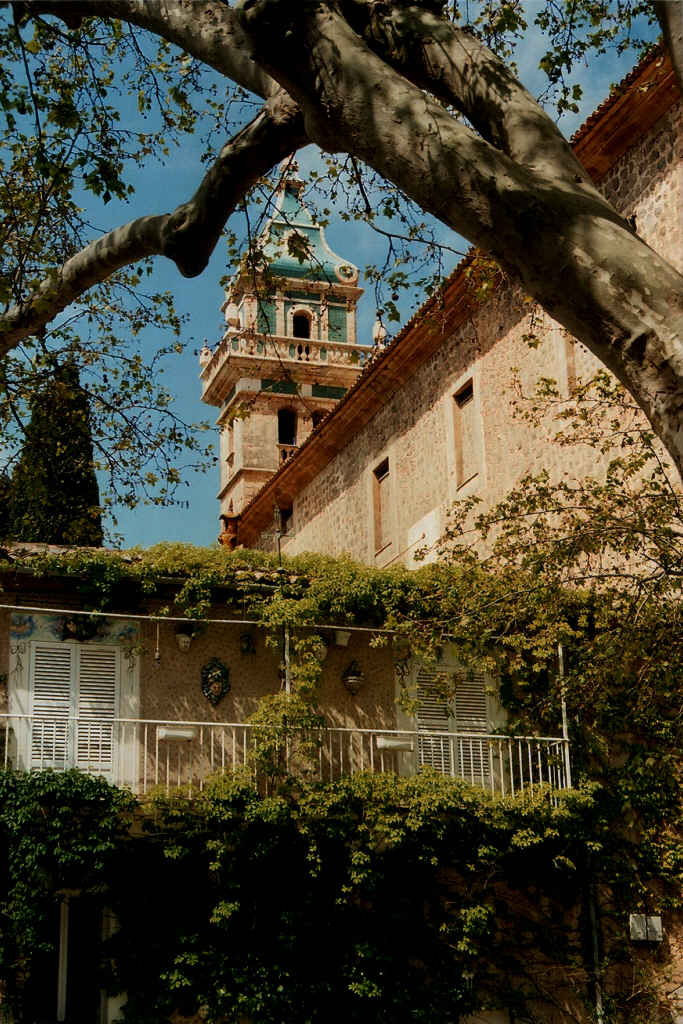
Charterhouse.

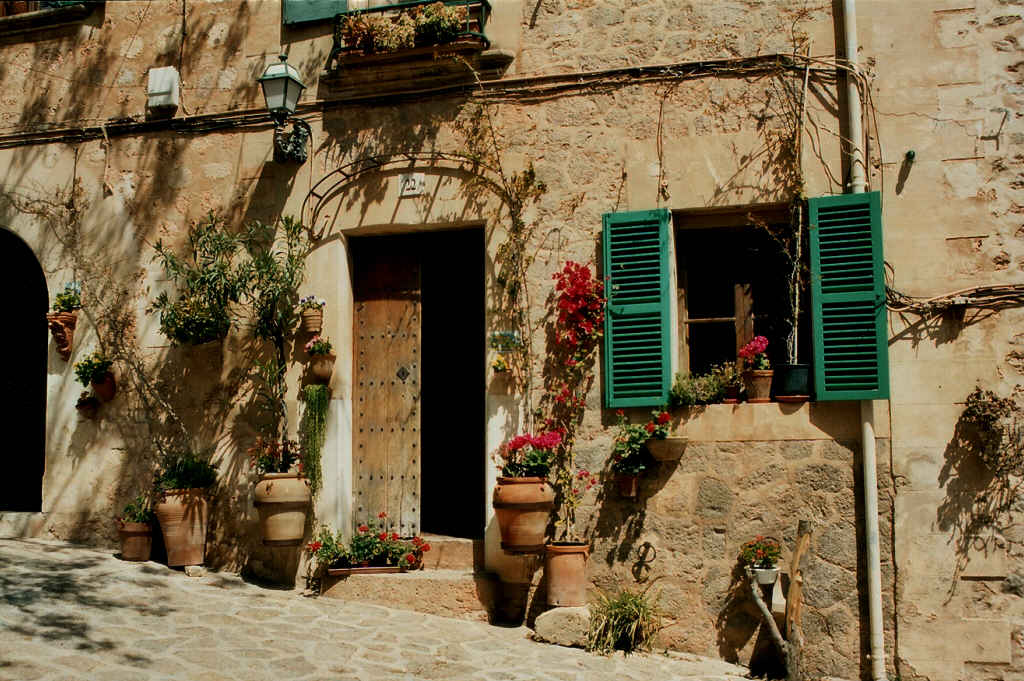
Floral decoration on the facades.

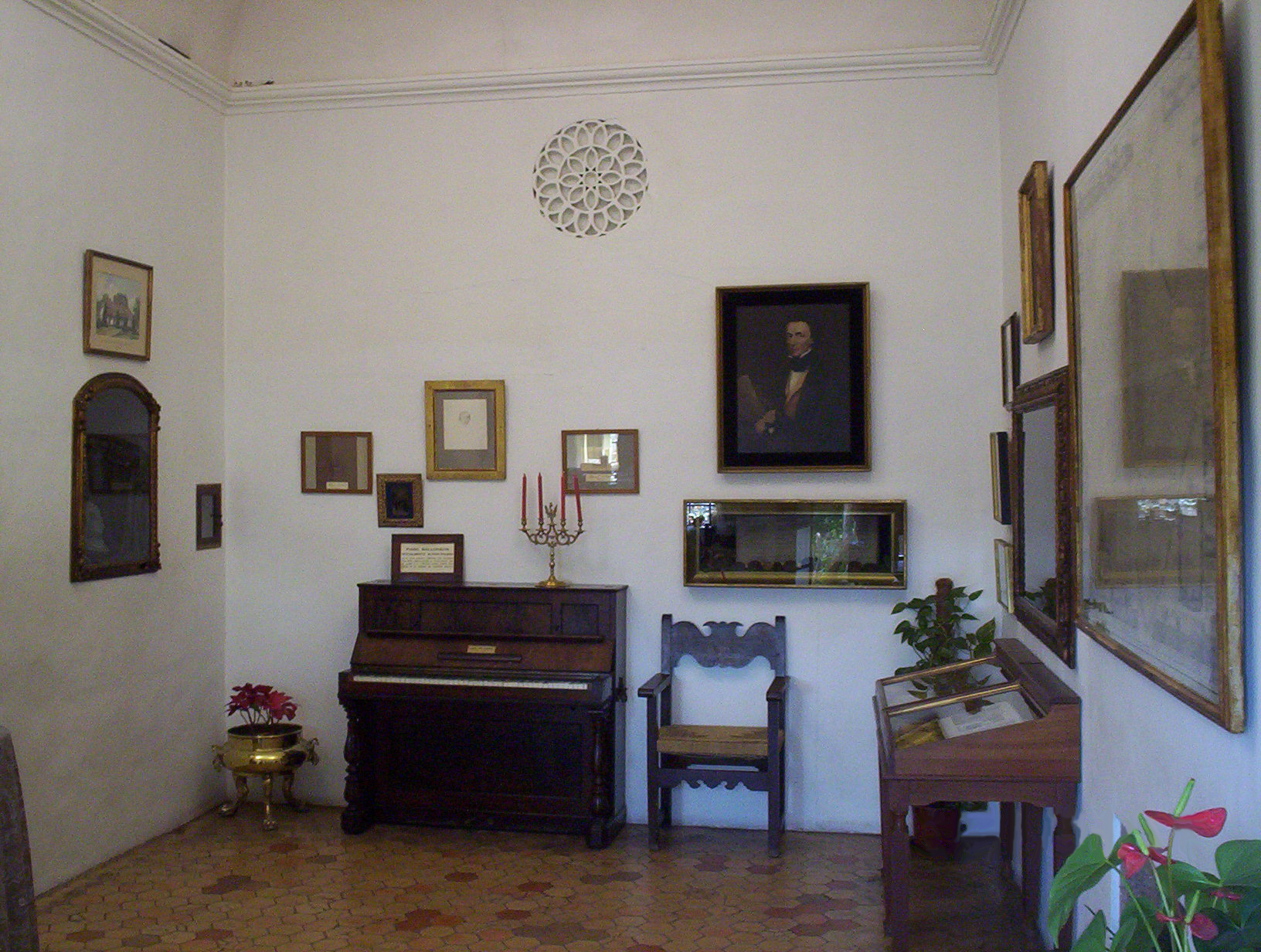
Chopin's piano, in the monastery.

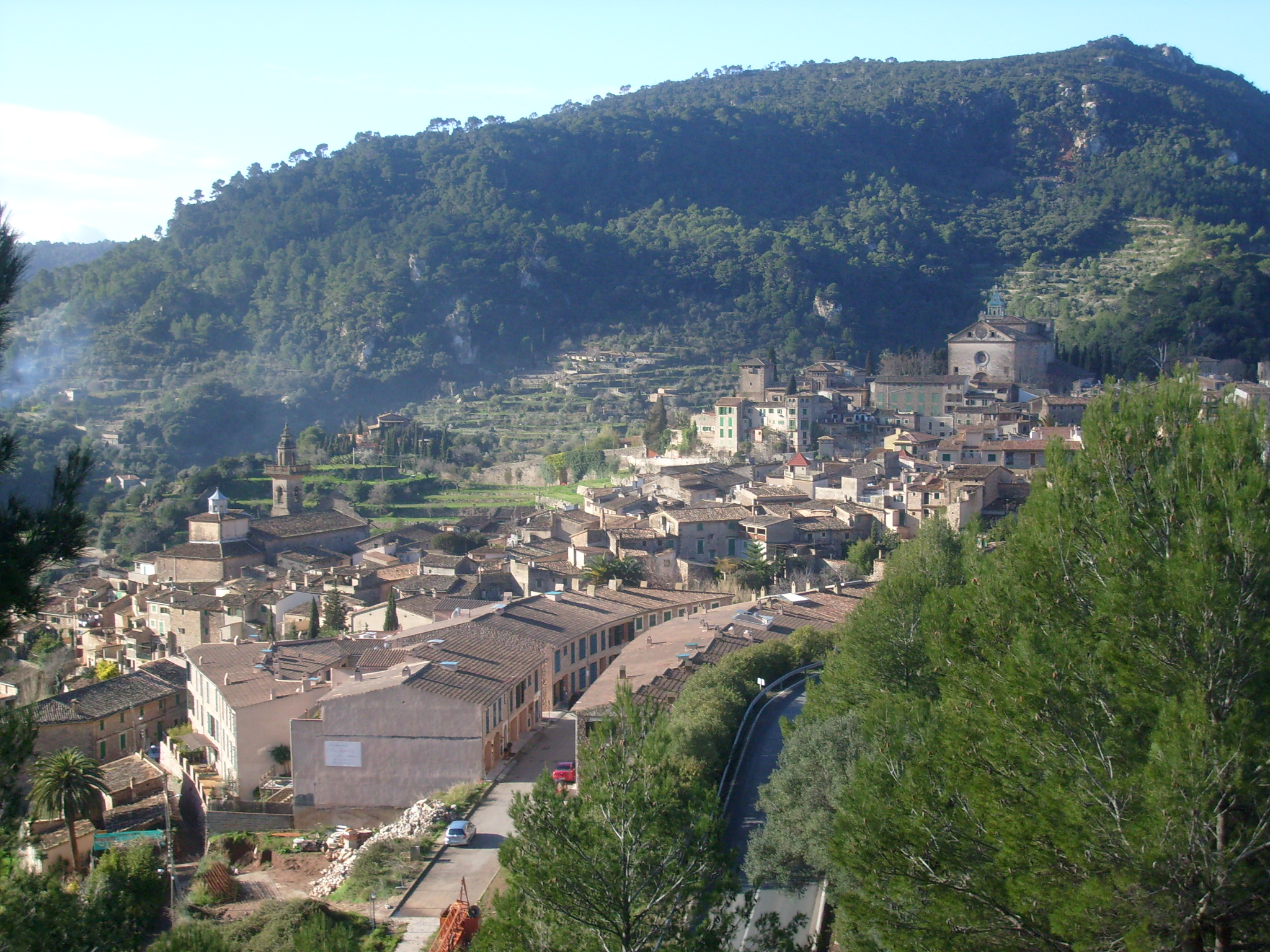
View over Valldemossa.

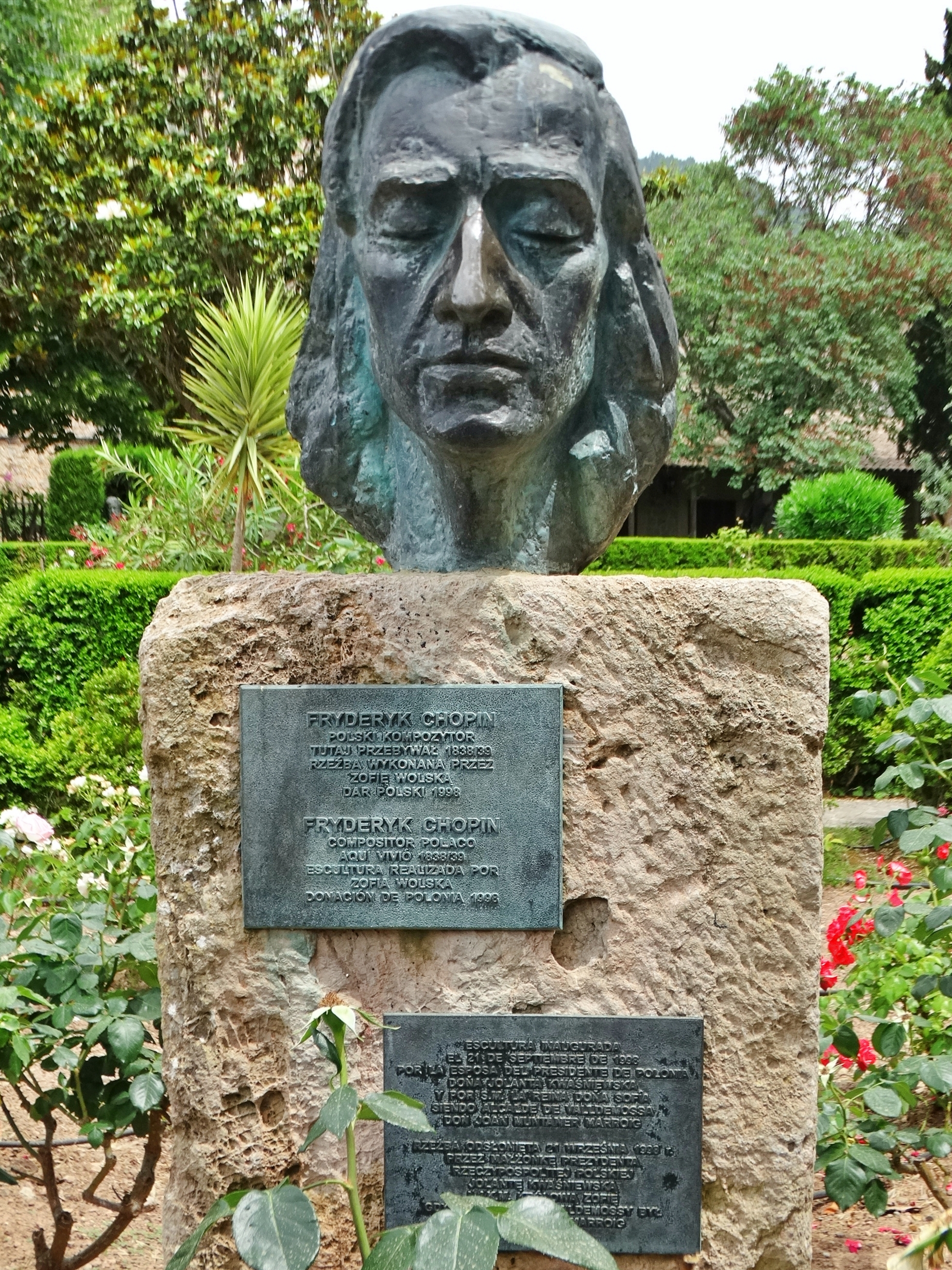
Frédéric Chopin Monument in Valldemossa.

== Notable people ==
=== Born in Valldemossa ===
- Catherine of Palma (1533-1574), saint

=== Related to Valldemossa ===
- Ramon Llull (ca 1232-ca 1316), author and philosopher
- Manuel Bayeu (1740-1809), monk and painter
- George Sand (1804-1876), French author and feminist
- Frédéric Chopin (1810-1849), Polish composer and piano player
- Ludwig Salvator of Austria (1847-1915), Austrian archduke and prince, author, scientist and ethnographer of the Mediterranean
- Santiago Rusiñol (1861-1931), Catalan painter
- Rubén Darío (1867-1916), Nicaraguan poet
- Jorge Luis Borges (1899-1986), Argentinian author and essayist
