= Manuel Marliani =

Spanish politician, writer and diplomat

Manuel Marliani Cassens (13 July 1795 in Cádiz – 5 January 1873 in Florence) was a Spanish writer, diplomat and politician of Italian descent. He was married twice (Charlotte de Folleville (1790–1850) and Giulia Mathieu) and was an important politician in the new Italian Kingdom.

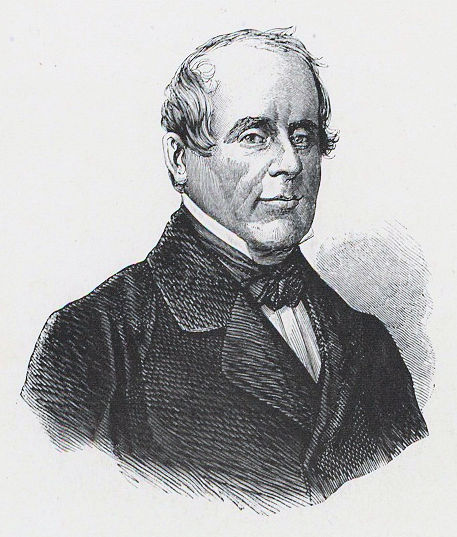
Emanuele Marliani, was a diplomat and politician.

== Works ==
- L'Espagne et ses révolutions (1833)
- Histoire politique de l'Espagne moderne...'' (1840–1841)
- Histoire politique de l'Espagne moderne... Vol.2 (1842)
- De la Influencia del Sistema prohibitivo en la Agricultura, Industria, Comercio, y rentas publicas
- Combate de Trafalgar: Vindicacion de La Armada Espanola (1850)
- 1854–1869. Un cambio de dinastía: la Casa de Borbón y la Casa de Saboya. Memoria (1869).
