= Valldemossa Charterhouse =

Monastery in Mallorca

Coordinates: 39.7089°N 2.62194°E

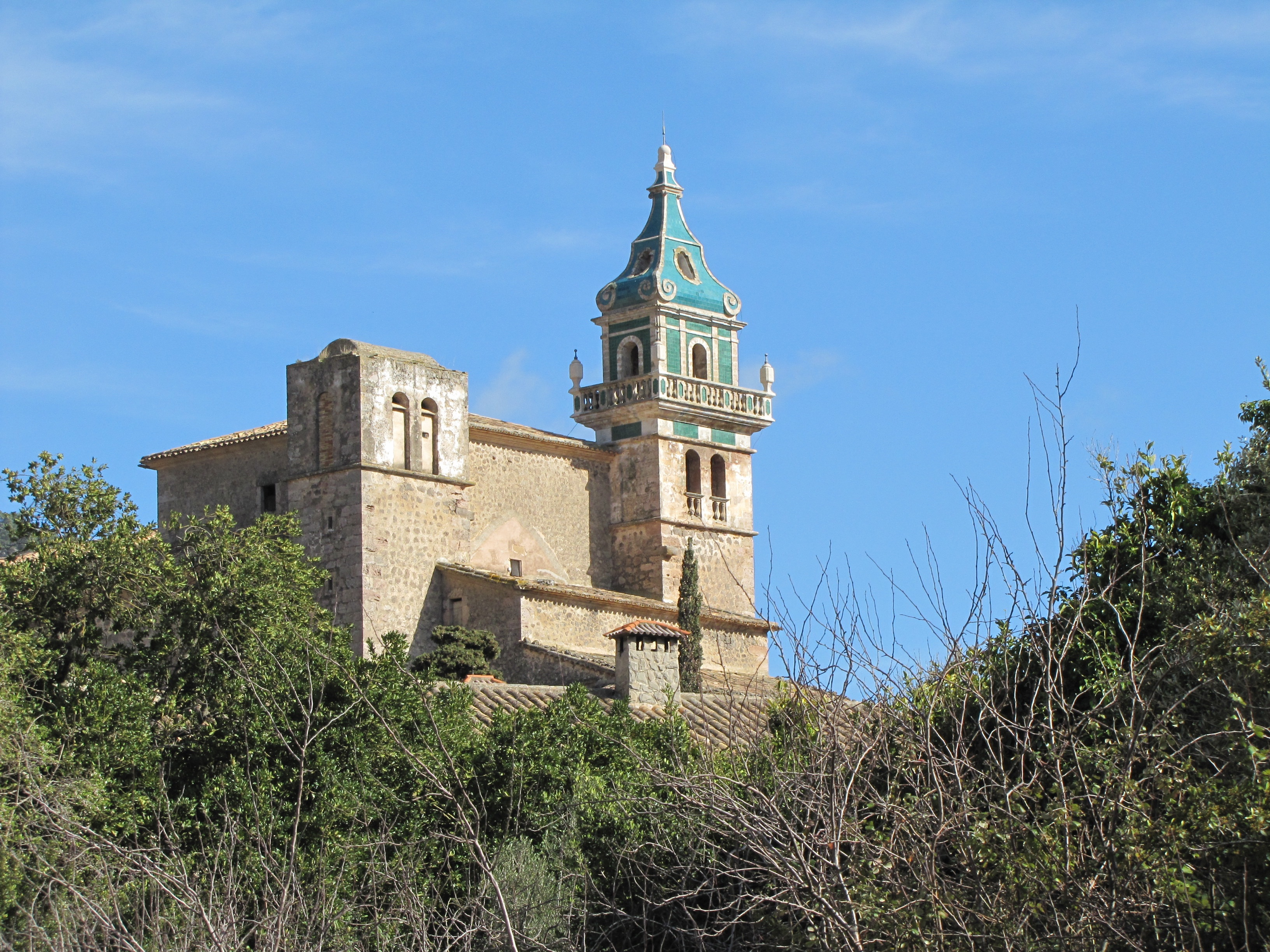
The church tower of Valldemossa Charterhouse

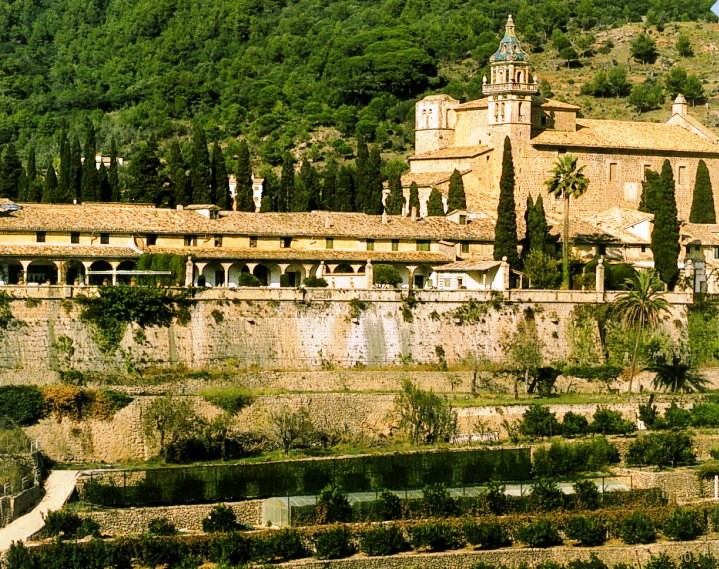
The cells of the monastery

The Valldemossa Charterhouse (Catalan: Cartoixa de Valldemossa, Spanish: Cartuja de Valldemosa, translatable as Carthusian Monastery of Valldemossa) is a palace in Valldemossa, Mallorca that was royal residence of the king Sancho of Majorca and later Royal Charterhouse (15th century) of the Carthusians.

== History ==
The origin of the complex dates back to the time of King James II of Majorca, who chose this exceptional place in the Sierra de Tramuntana, located more than 400 meters high, to build a palace for his son Sancho, known as the "Palace of the King Sancho". In the year 1399 Martin of Aragon yielded all the royal possessions of Valldemossa to the Carthusian monks. Saint Catherine of Palma, one of the Patron Saints of Mallorca, was born at the Monastery in 1533 and died in Palma in 1574.

The church, a neoclassical building decorated by great artists and craftsmen of the time, began to be built in 1751 on the primitive church erected in 1446. The Carthusian painter Joaquim Juncosa of the fellow Carthusian monastery of Scala Dei painted twelve oil paintings on the Mysteries of the Rosary, some of his only surviving paintings. The complex has a cloister (one of the oldest parts of the current buildings), the old pharmacy of the Carthusians, a garden and the rooms of the Prioral Cell–chapel, former library, audience room, dormitory—where the historical and artistic legacy of the Carthusians is preserved, showing how the monks lived. These founded the Charterhouse and inhabited it until 1835, when the community was forced to leave and the property was given to private hands by the Ecclesiastical confiscations of Mendizábal.

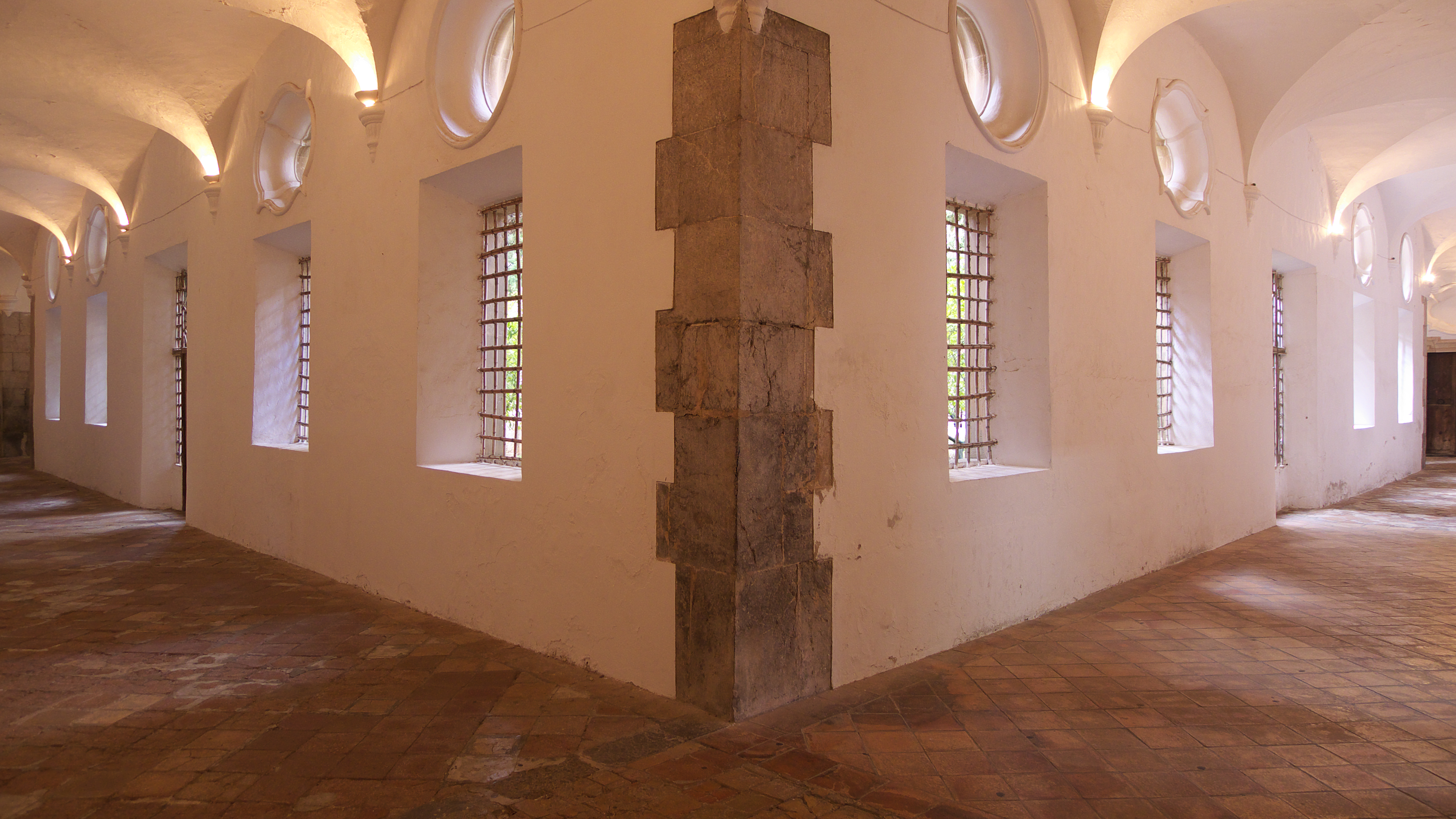
The cloisters around its gardens

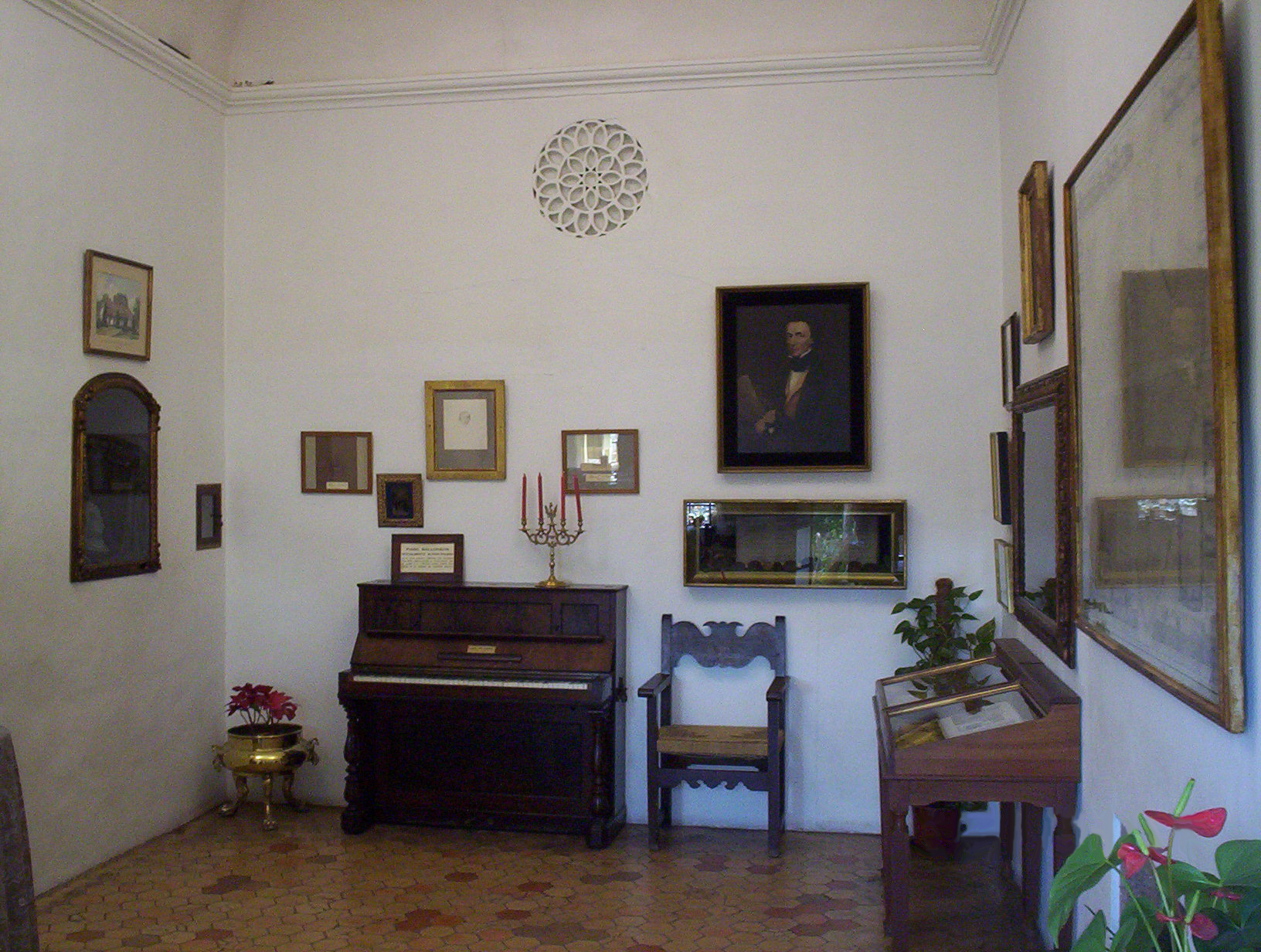
Chopin's Pleyel upright piano

After the expulsion of the monks in 1835, individual cells became available for rent. One of the cells, comprising 3 large rooms and a garden, was occupied by the composer Frédéric Chopin and the writer George Sand, with her family, during their sojourn in winter 1838–1839. In that period, Chopin completed his Preludes Op. 28 and composed the Ballade No. 2, Op. 38 in F major, the Scherzo no. 3, op. 39 in C-sharp minor, and one of the Polonaises, Op. 40; after their departure, Sand later wrote A Winter in Majorca. The "Chopin cell" has now been converted into a museum containing Chopin's Pleyel upright piano, documents, paintings and other memorabilia.

== See also ==
- List of music museums
