= XIV International Chopin Piano Competition =

2000 piano competition in Warsaw, Poland

The Fourteenth International Fryderyk Chopin Piano Competition
- Official poster
- Date: 4–22 October 2000
- Venue: National Philharmonic, Warsaw
- Hosted by: Fryderyk Chopin Society
- Winner: (China) Li Yundi
- Website: http://www.konkurs.chopin.pl

The XIV International Chopin Piano Competition (Polish: XIV Międzynarodowy Konkurs Pianistyczny im. Fryderyka Chopina) was held from 4 to 22 October 2000 in Warsaw. Li Yundi of China won the First Prize, becoming the first Chinese First Prize winner as well as the youngest First Prize winner in the competition's history. He was the first competitor to be awarded the First Prize (the gold medal) in 15 years since Stanislav Bunin won it in 1985.

== Background ==
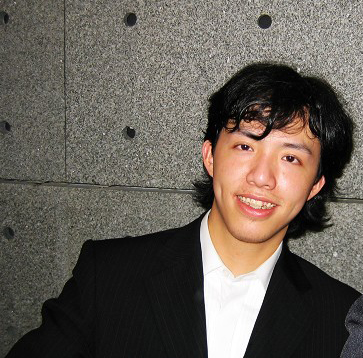
The winner of the competition, Chinese Li Yundi

The director of the competition was Albert Grudziński. According to the rules of the 14th edition of the competition, individuals aged 17–28 were eligible to participate. By March 1, 2000, among other requirements, applicants had to submit a video tape containing specific works by Frédéric Chopin, as listed in the regulations and recorded by the candidate. Subsequently, a qualifying committee appointed by the competition organizers selected the best performers, qualifying and inviting them to take part in the competition. The qualifying committee chose 98 pianists from 25 countries. Ultimately, after four pianists withdrew, 94 of them participated in the competition auditions.

The competition auditions were divided into three stages, which took place on October 5–9 (Stage I), October 11–14 (Stage II), and October 15–16 (Stage III). The final concerts lasted from October 18 to 19. On October 20-22, three final concerts of the laureates were held. The competition was won by the Chinese pianist Li Yundi, who received a gold medal, $25,000 and a laurel wreath. This made him the youngest and first Chinese first-prize winner in the competition's history. He was also the first pianist to be awarded the first prize in 15 years; the judges had refused to award it in both 1990 and 1995, and the last recipient was Stanislav Bunin in 1985.

== Calendar ==
Competition calendar
Date
4.10	5.10	6.10	7.10	8.10	9.10	10.10	11.10	12.10	13.10	14.10	15.10	16.10	17.10	18.10	19.10	20.10	21.10	22.10
Inaugural concert	Stage I						Stage II				Stage III			Final		Winners' concerts		
19:30	10:00; 17:00	10:00; 17:00	10:00; 17:00	10:00; 17:00	10:00; 17:00		10:00; 17:00	10:00; 17:00	10:00; 17:00	10:00; 17:00	10:00; 17:00	10:00; 17:00		18:00	18:00	19:00	19:00	19:00

== Main Stage ==
=== Program ===
According to tradition, the competition featured only works by Frédéric Chopin. The regulations stipulated that participants had to choose specific pieces from available groups, which were to be played from memory.

For Stage I, the pieces were to be performed in any order, with the exception of the études, which were to be played one after the other. For Stage II, pianists were allowed to perform the pieces in any order but were required to submit the exact performance time for each piece in their application, as the stage lasted between 35 and 40 minutes. The jury reserved the right to interrupt any performance that exceeded this time limit. For Stage III, the pieces could be performed in any order, with the stipulation that the repeat of the exposition in the first movement of sonatas was not to be included. The polonaise in Stage II, the mazurkas in Stage III, and the concerto in the final were each assessed separately.

Competition program
Stage I
One of the following nocturnes: Nocturne in B major, Op. 9, No. 3 ; Nocturne in G major, Op. 37, No. 2; Nocturne in C minor, Op. 48, No. 1; Nocturne in F♯ minor, Op. 48, No. 2; Nocturne in E♭ major, Op. 55, No. 2; Nocturne in B major, Op. 62 No. 1; Nocturne in E major, Op. 62 No. 2.	One of the following études: Étude in C major, Op. 10, No. 1; Étude in C♯ minor, Op. 10, No. 4 ; Étude in G♭ major, Op. 10, No. 5 ; Étude in F major, Op. 10, No. 8; Étude in C minor, Op. 10, No. 12; Étude in A minor, Op. 25, No. 11.	One of the following études: Étude in A minor, Op. 10, No. 2 ; Étude in C major, Op. 10, No. 7; Étude in A♭ major, Op. 10, No. 10; Étude in E♭ major, Op. 10, No. 11; Étude in A minor, Op. 25, No. 4; Étude in E minor, Op. 25, No. 5; Étude in G♯ minor, Op. 25, No. 6; Étude in B minor, Op. 25, No. 10.	One of the following pieces: Ballade in G minor, Op. 23; Ballade in F major, Op. 38; Ballade in A♭ major, Op. 47; Ballade in F minor, Op. 52; Barcarolle in F♯ major, Op. 60; Fantasy in F minor, Op. 49.
Stage II
One of the following polonaises: Andante spianato and Grande Polonaise in E♭ major, Op. 22; Polonaise in F♯ minor, Op. 44; Polonaise in A♭ major, Op. 53; Polonaise-Fantasie in A♭ major, Op. 61.	One of the following scherzos: Scherzo No. 1 in B minor, Op. 20; Scherzo No. 2 in B♭ minor, Op. 31; Scherzo No. 3 in C♯ minor, Op. 39 ; Scherzo No. 4 in E major, Op. 54.	One of the following waltzes: Waltz in E♭ major, Op. 18; Waltz in A♭ major, Op. 34, No. 1; Waltz in F major, Op. 34, No. 3; Waltz in A♭ major, Op. 42; Waltz in A♭ major, Op. 64, No. 3.	One of the following pieces: Impromptu in F♯ major, Op. 36; Impromptu in G♭ major, Op. 51; Rondo à la Mazur in F major, Op. 5; Rondo in E♭ major; at least four subsequent preludes from Op. 28, starting with No. 8; Prelude in C♯ minor, Op. 45; Berceuse in D♭ major, Op. 57; Tarantella in A♭ major, Op. 43; Étude in E♭ minor, Op. 10, No. 6; Étude in C♯ minor, Op. 25, No. 7.
Stage III
A complete cycle of mazurkas from the following opuses: 17; 24; 30; 33; 41; 50; 56; 59.		One of the following sonatas: Sonata in B♭ minor, Op. 35 lub Sonata in B minor, Op. 58.	
Final
One of the concertos: Piano Concerto in E minor, Op. 11 or Piano Concerto in F minor, Op. 21.

=== Rules ===
The qualification system differed fundamentally from the regulations of previous competitions. The assessment of the participants' playing was based on two systems.

- System A – involved placing a declarative "yes" or "no" evaluation next to each participant's name on the list. After each of the three stages, this system either qualified the pianist to advance to the next stage or not. It was also the basis for awarding special prizes.
- System B – involved scoring the pianist on a scale of 1 to 100 after Stages I, II, and III as a supplementary system, and on a scale of 1 to 12 points after the finale, as the system used for awarding the statutory prizes.

After the auditions for a given stage concluded and calculations were made, the jurors received the results in the form of a list showing the number of "yes" votes, ranked from highest to lowest, but without arithmetic averages of the point scores. The jury decided through open voting at which position to close the list of "yes" votes qualifying participants to advance to the next stage. If it was impossible to select the full group of candidates for the next stages using System A, System B was utilized, admitting the next highest-scoring participants. The number of participants admitted to subsequent stages was determined by the competition regulations.

=== Competition pianos ===
The pianists participating in the competition could choose the piano for their performances from among four instruments of the following brands: Kawai, Steinway (serial no. 25), Steinway (serial no. 30), and Yamaha. Fifty-eight of the ninety-four pianists chose Steinway pianos. Several times during the competition, pianists including Piotr Machnik and Feodor Amirow switched piano brands.

== Summary ==
=== Inaugural concert ===
The competition began on October 4th with an inaugural concert at the Warsaw National Philharmonic. The Warsaw National Philharmonic Orchestra was conducted by Kazimierz Kord, with violinist Konstanty Andrzej Kulka, performing Witold Lutosławski's Concerto for Orchestra and Mieczysław Karłowicz's Violin Concerto in A major, Op. 8, as well as soloist Elżbieta Szmytka, who performed Szymanowski's Symphony No. 3 Song of the Night.

=== Stage I ===
On October 5, 2000, the first stage of the competition began. The pianists performed in an order determined by a draw of the letters of the alphabet (the letter "M" was drawn). The first to perform in Stage I was the Polish pianist Piotr Machnik. For five consecutive days, participants performed successively in two sessions: a morning session (starting at 10:00 a.m.) and an afternoon session (starting at 5:00 p.m.).

=== Stage II ===
38 pianists with the highest arithmetic average of all jurors' scores were admitted to the second stage, taking into account the percentage indicators of their subjective declaration of admission to the second stage.

Participants of Stage II

No.	Participant	Country
1.	Ingrid Fliter	ARG
2.	Juri Blinow	BLR
3.	Chen Cheng	CHN
4.	Ju Jin	CHN
5.	Chen Sa	CHN
6.	Tan Xiaotang	CHN
7.	Li Yundi	CHN
8.	Yen Chun-chien	TPE CHN
9.	Martin Kasík	CZE
10.	Etsuko Hirose	FRA
11.	Maxence Pilchen	FRA
12.	Nicolas Stavy	FRA
13.	Marianna Prjevalskaya	ESP

No.	Participant	Country
14.	Ka-Ling Colleen Lee	HKG CHN
15.	Nami Ejiri	JPN
16.	Takeshi Kakehashi	JPN
17.	Yurie Miura	JPN
18.	Rieko Nezu	JPN
19.	Mika Satō	JPN
20.	Hiroaki Yamaguchi	JPN
21.	Vladimir Milošević	FRY
22.	Kim Jeong-won	KOR
23.	Yoo Yung-wook	KOR
24.	Andrej Jusow	DEU
25.	Yorck Hardy Rittner	DEU
26.	Piotr Machnik	POL

No.	Participant	Country
27.	Natalia Sawościanik (now Rehling)	POL
28.	Radosław Sobczak	POL
29.	Daniel Wnukowski	POL
30.	Feodor Amirow	RUS
31.	Valentina Igoshina	RUS
32.	Alexander Kobrin	RUS
33.	Aleksej Komarow	RUS
34.	Mihaela Ursuleasa	ROU
35.	Ning An	USA
36.	Giuseppe Albanese	ITA
37.	Alberto Nosè	ITA
38.	Roberto Prosseda	ITA

=== Stage III ===
The competition jury admitted 12 pianists to the third stage.

Participants of Stage III

No.	Participant	Country
1.	Ingrid Fliter	ARG
2.	Chen Sa	CHN
3.	Li Yundi	CHN
4.	Etsuko Hirose	FRA
5.	Nicolas Stavy	FRA
6.	Mika Satō	JPN
7.	Radosław Sobczak	POL
8.	Valentina Igoshina	RUS
9.	Alexander Kobrin	RUS
10.	Mihaela Ursuleasa	ROU
11.	Ning An	USA
12.	Alberto Nosè	ITA

=== Final ===
By the jury's decision, 6 pianists were qualified for the final. Only Ingrid Fliter chose the Piano Concerto in F minor, Op. 21; the other five finalists decided to perform the Piano Concerto in E minor, Op. 11.

Finalists

No.	Finalist	Country
1.	Ingrid Fliter	ARG
2.	Chen Sa	CHN
3.	Li Yundi	CHN
4.	Mika Satō	JPN
5.	Alexander Kobrin	RUS
6.	Alberto Nosè	ITA

=== Winners' concerts ===
The awards ceremony and winners' concerts for the competition were held at the Warsaw National Philharmonic. It was attended by Queen Sofía of Spain, then-Polish President Aleksander Kwaśniewski and his wife, alongside other senior Polish political and diplomatic figures. Following official speeches and the presentation of statutory awards to the winners, the winners' concerts featured a diverse program of Chopin's works, including preludes, études, mazurkas, and scherzos. The concert culminated with a performance by the first-prize winner, Li Yundi, who played the Andante spianato et grande polonaise brillanter, Op. 22, for which he also received a special polonaise prize during the competition. The event concluded with a gala reception for guests, jurors, and participants.

== Awards ==
The top three finalists were awarded medals. All finalists received a cash prize based on their ranking. Special and non-statutory awards were also presented, as well as invitations to concert series and other events. According to the regulations, the winners were required to participate in the winners' concerts. In addition, all participants in the second and third stages who did not qualify as finalists received commemorative diplomas. The following prizes were awarded:

Prize		Winner	
1st place, gold medalist(s)	US$25,000	Li Yundi	China
2nd place, silver medalist(s)	US$20,000	Ingrid Fliter	Argentina
3rd place, bronze medalist(s)	US$15,000	Alexander Kobrin	Russia
4th	US$11,000	Sa Chen	China
5th	US$8,000	Alberto Nosè	Italy
6th	US$6,000	Mika Sato	Japan
HM	US$2,000	Ning An	United States
HM	US$2,000	Etsuko Hirose	France
HM	US$2,000	Valentina Igoshina	Russia
HM	US$2,000	Radosław Sobczak	Poland
HM	US$2,000	Nicolas Stavy	France
HM	US$2,000	Mihaela Ursuleasa	Romania

In addition, three special prizes were awarded independently:

Special prize	Winner	
Best Performance of a Concerto	not awarded	
Best Performance of Mazurkas	not awarded	
Best Performance of a Polonaise	Li Yundi	China
Best Performance of a Polonaise	Sa Chen	China

After the previous two competitions had failed to produce a clear winner, it is said that the jury was once again inclined to withhold the first prize at one point. However, according to Los Angeles Times's report, at the final, the entire auditorium in Warsaw erupted in a standing ovation following Li Yundi's rendition of the Concerto No. 1. The panel of 23 judges, which included Martha Argerich, praised his approach to Chopin’s music. In a radio interview with RMF, the chairman of the jury, Andrzej Jasiński, was asked why Li Yundi won the competition and if there had been any other contenders. Jasiński stated that he won because he was the best and that, in his opinion, there was no other rival candidate. When questioned if his success was due to an innate talent or rigorous training, Jasiński affirmed it was both, describing innate talent as a vessel that must be filled with thousands of hours of practice, which when done with love and intelligence, yields such results. A report from Wirtualna Polska stated that, while the journalists were confused about placing Alexander Kobrin ahead of Sa Chen and only awarding sixth to Mika Sato, Li Yundi's victory was received as "undoubtedly justified". Gazeta Wyborcza commented that the selection of Li Yundi as the first-prize winner ultimately preserved the jury's credibility, despite the overall level of the competition.

== Jury ==
The jury consisted of:

- (Argentina) Martha Argerich (joined during Stage II) ( (gold) VII)
- (United States) Edward Auer
- (Austria) Paul Badura-Skoda
- (Brazil) Arnaldo Cohen
- (United States) (Portugal) Sequeira Costa
- (Poland) Halina Czerny-Stefańska ( (gold) IV)
- (Japan) Ikuko Endo
- (Poland) Kazimierz Gierzod
- (Poland) Lidia Grychtołówna
- (Poland) Adam Harasiewicz ( (gold) V)
- (United States) Eugen Indjic
- (Poland) Andrzej Jasiński (chairman)
- (Czechoslovakia) Ivan Klánský
- (Russia) Victor Merzhanov
- (France) Germaine Mounier
- (Japan) Hiroko Nakamura
- (Poland) Piotr Paleczny (vice-chairman)
- (Italy) Sergio Perticaroli
- (France) Bernard Ringeissen (vice-chairman)
- (Germany) Annerose Schmidt
- (Poland) Regina Smendzianka
- (Poland) Józef Stompel
- (Israel) Arie Vardi

After the competition, the chairman of the jury, Andrzej Jasiński, summed up the competition in a statement to journalists, stating, among others:

I would also like to emphasize that Yundi Li is very mature for his age, and most importantly - he feels Chopin's music. His interpretations are never controversial; he plays beautifully and has imagination, charm and pearly technique. This is all the more important because we didn't hear many outstanding, truly Chopin-esque interpretations during this year's competition, as evidenced primarily by the fact that the award for the best performance of the mazurkas was not granted. I say this with a certain sadness. There were – and this is the opinion of the jurors – many pianists who play with finesse, imagination, and technical excellence, but this technical ornamentation lacked heart. Perhaps this is a sign of our times, when the pursuit of modernity at all costs drowns out the romantic in us. And without this, playing mazurkas, or indeed Chopin in general, is very difficult.

— Andrzej Jasiński,
