= Ferruccio Busoni International Piano Competition =

Italian music competition

The Ferruccio Busoni International Piano Competition is a music competition for young pianists that takes place in Bolzano, Italy. It was founded in 1949 by Cesare Nordio in memory of the pianist and composer Ferruccio Busoni.

== History ==
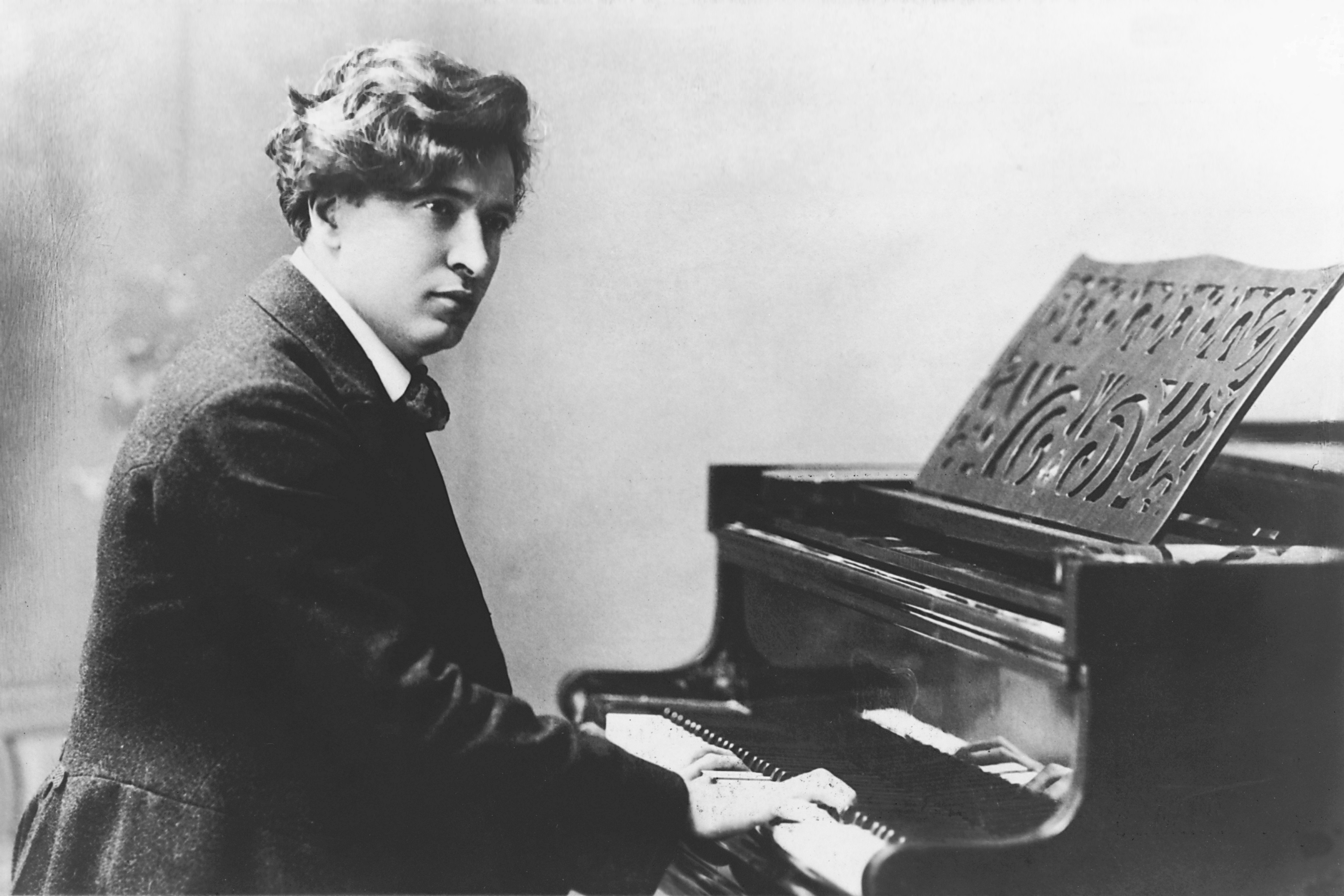
Ferrucio Busoni

The first Ferruccio Busoni International Piano Competition was organized by Cesare Nordio in 1949 to celebrate the 25th anniversary of the death of the pianist and composer. Arturo Benedetti Michelangeli was a supporter of the competition and was a member of the inaugural jury. Alfred Brendel won the 4th prize in this competition. For a few years a piano composition competition took place together with the piano competition.

In 1956, the young Maurizio Pollini took part in the competition, performing the Fantasia Contrappuntistica by Kenneth Leighton, which won the prize for composition; in 1957 Martha Argerich won the first prize. Other prize winners include Bruno Canino, Agustin Anievas, Joaquín Achúcarro, Jerome Rose, Garrick Ohlsson, Alberto Nosè and Wu Muye.

Members of the jury have included: Arturo Benedetti Michelangeli, Nikita Magaloff, Igor Markevitch, Carlo Maria Giulini, Garrick Ohlsson, Bruno Canino, Mario Castelnuovo-Tedesco, Paul Badura-Skoda, Rafael Orozco, Joaquín Soriano, Gerhard Oppitz, Abdel Rahman El Bacha, Michele Campanella, Leif Ove Andsnes, Adam Harasiewicz, Hiroko Nakamura, Martha Argerich, Andrzej Jasiński, Lilya Zilberstein, Tadeusz Żmudziński, Valery Afanassiev and Eliso Virsaladze.

== Winners ==
Complete list of winners:

Winners of the top prizes for each year
Year	First prize	Second prize	Third prize
1949	not awarded	(Italy) Lodovico Lessona	(Italy) Rossana Orlandini; 4th prize: (Austria) Alfred Brendel
1950	not awarded	(West Germany) Karl-Heinz Schlüter	(France) Jacques Coulaud
1951	not awarded	not awarded	(Switzerland) Karl Engel and (Austria) Walter Klien
1952	(Italy) Sergio Perticaroli	(Poland) Andrzej Wasowski	(Italy) Marisa Candeloro and (Italy) Agostino Orizio
1953	(United States) Ella Goldstein	(United States) Monte Hill Davis	(Spain) Esteban Sanchez Herrero
1954	(Italy) Aldo Mancinelli	(France) Gabriel Tacchino	(West Germany) Günter Ludwig
1955	not awarded	(France) Germaine Devéze	(West Germany) Günter Ludwig
1956	(Austria) Jörg Demus	Ivan Davis	James Mathis. 4th prize: Bruno Canino and Michael Ponti
1957	(Argentina) (Switzerland) Martha Argerich	(United States) Ivan Davis and (United States) Jerome Lowenthal	(United States) Jeaneane Dowis
1958	(Mexico) José Kahan	(Canada) Ronald Turini	(Italy) Fabio Peressoni and (United States) Michael Ponti (Italy) 4th prize: Bruno Canino
1959	not awarded	(France) Cécile Ousset and (United States) John Perry	(Hungary) Imre Antal and (United States) Leonhard Hokanson; 4th prize: (Spain) Joaquín Achúcarro
1960	not awarded	(United States) Agustin Anievas and (United States) James Mathis	(Hungary) Imre Antal
1961	(United States) Jerome Rose	(United Kingdom) Norma Fisher and (United States) Howard Aibel	(Socialist Federal Republic of Yugoslavia) Dubravka Tomšič Srebotnjak
1962	not awarded	(Canada) Brenton Dale Bartlett	(Hungary) Iván Erőd and (Philippines) Reynaldo Reyes
1963	not awarded	(West Germany) Gernot Kahl	(Philippines) José Maria Contreras
1964	(United States) Michael Ponti	(France) François-Joël Thiollier	(Bulgaria) Ivan Drenikov
1965	not awarded	(Bulgaria) Bojidar Noev	(United States) James Dick
1966	(United States) Garrick Ohlsson	(United States) Richard Goode	
1967	not awarded	(Czechoslovakia) Ivan Klánský	(Italy) Pietro Maranca
1968	(Soviet Union) Vladimir Selivochin	(Soviet Union) Mark Zeltser	(West Germany) Benedikt Köhlen and (United States) Craig Sheppard
1969	(United States) Ursula Oppens	(Italy) Annamaria Cigoli	(Japan) Akiko Kitagawa
1970	not awarded	Selection prize: (Philippines) Maria Luisa Lopez-Vito	
1971	not awarded	(United States) Nina Tichman	(Israel) Ilan Rogoff and (United States) Marioara Trifan
1972	(Brazil) Arnaldo Cohen	not awarded	(United Kingdom) Peter Bithell and (British Hong Kong) David Oei
1973	not awarded	(West Germany) Roland Keller and (Poland) Andrzej Ratusiński	(Poland) Elza Kolodin
1974	(West Germany) Robert Benz	(United States) Pascal Devoyon	(United States) Diane Walsh
1975	not awarded	(Sweden) Staffan Scheja	(Sweden) Laszlo Simon and (United Kingdom) Terence Judd
1976	(Italy) Roberto Cappello	(Argentina) Daniel Rivera	(United Kingdom) Susan Ann Howes and (Canada) Adrienne Shannon
1977	not awarded	(Japan) Ayami Ikeba and (France) Véronique Roux	(Netherlands) Joop Celis and (Japan) Kyoto Ito
1978	(United States) Boris Bloch	(Malaysia) Dennis Lee	(West Germany) Arnulf von Arnim; 4th prize: (Spain) Josep Colom
1979	(Canada) Catherine Vickers	not awarded	(United States) Alyce Le Blanc
1980	not awarded	(Japan) Ruriko Kikuchi, (West Germany) Rolf Plagge and (South Korea) Hai-Kyung Suh	
1981	(West Germany) Margarita Höhenrieder	(United States) Lev Natochenny	(Bulgaria) Boyan Vodenitcharov
1982	not awarded	(Taiwan) Hung-Kuan Chen	(United States) Daniel Blumenthal and (Japan) Yukino Fujiwara
1983	not awarded	(United States) Robert McDonald	(United States) Frederick Blum and (United States) Arthur Greene
1984	(Canada) Louis Lortie	(Austria) Matthias Fletzberger	(West Germany) Bernd Glemser
1985	(Brazil) José Carlos Cocarelli	(Israel) Uriel Tsachor and (Japan) Akira Wakabayashi	(Soviet Union) Natalia Vlassenko and (Japan) Takahashi Yamamoto
1986	not awarded	(United Kingdom) Benjamin Frith and (Socialist Federal Republic of Yugoslavia) Pedrag Muzijevic	(Switzerland) R. Clipper Erickson and (West Germany) Igor Kamenz
1987	(Soviet Union) Lilya Zilberstein	(Soviet Union) Valery Kuleshof	(Australia) Ian Munro and (Chile) Alfredo Perl
1988	not awarded	(West Germany) Igor Kamenz and (United States) Benjamin Pasternack	(Italy) Fabio Bidini
1989	not awarded	(Socialist Federal Republic of Yugoslavia) Aleksandar Madžar	(Italy) Francesco Cipolletta and (Soviet Union) Valery Grohovsky
1990	not awarded	(Soviet Union) Karina Yavlenskaya	(Japan) Midori Nohara
1991	not awarded	(France) Olivier Cazal and (Germany) Igor Kamenz	(Soviet Union) Stanislav Judenich
1992	(Ukraine) Anna Kravtchenko	(Italy) Fabio Bidini	(United States) Mark Anderson and (Armenia) Sergei Babayan
1993	(Italy) Roberto Cominati	(Ukraine) Vitaly Samoschko	(France) Olivier Cazal
1994	(Georgia (country)) Mzia Simonishwili	(Japan) Iwao Murakami	(Italy) Corrado Rollero
1995	(Russia) Alexander Shtarkman	(Russia) Sergei Tarasov	
1996	not awarded	(Germany) Jan Gottlieb Jiracek	(Ukraine) Michael Dantschenko
1997	not awarded	(South Korea) Yoon-Soo Lee	(Russia) Dimitri Vorobieff
1998	not awarded	(Italy) Olaf John Laneri	(Canada) Catherine Chi
1999	(Russia) Alexander Kobrin	(Italy) Alberto Nosè	(South Korea) Min-Soo Sohn
2000	not awarded	not awarded	(Japan) Ayako Kimura and (Germany) Carl Wolf
2001	(Ukraine) Alexander Romanovsky	(South Korea) Hea-Jung Cho	(South Korea) Dong-Min Lim
2003	not awarded	(Russia) Maria Stembolskaia	(Russia) Lyubov Gegetchkori and (China) Mu-Ye Wu
2004/2005	(Italy) Giuseppe Andaloro	(Italy) Mariangela Vacatello	(South Korea) Hye-Jin Kim
2006/2007	(United States) Matthew Ward	(Russia) Sofya Gulyak and (Ukraine) Dinara Nadzhafova	(Russia) Lilian Akopova
2008/2009	(Germany) Michail Lifits	(Russia) Alexey Lebedev	(Italy) Gesualdo Coggi
2010/2011	not awarded	(Russia) Anna Bulkina and (Ukraine) Antonii Barishevskyi	(Russia) Tatiana Chernichka
2012/2013	not awarded	(Italy) Rodolfo Leone	(Japan) Akihiro Sakiya and (Russia) Dmitry Shishkin
2014/2015	(South Korea) Ji-Yeong Mun	(Italy) Alberto Ferro	(Ukraine) Roman Lopatynskyi
2016/2017	(Croatia) Ivan Krpan	(South Korea) Jae-Yeon Won	(Russia) Anna Geniushene
2018/2019	(Bulgaria) Emanuil Ivanov	(Japan) Shiori Kuwahara	(Georgia (country)) Giorgi Gigashvili
2021	(South Korea) Jae Hong Park	(South Korea) Do-Hyun Kim	(Austria) Lukas Sternath
2023	(Russia) Arsenii Mun	(United States) Anthony Ratinov	(Japan) Ryota Yamazaki
2025	(China) Yifan Wu	(Georgia (country)) Sandro Nebieridze	(Cyprus) (Greece) Christos Fountos
