= Bidini =

Bidini is a surname. Notable people with the surname include:

- Dave Bidini (born 1963), Canadian musician and writer
- Fabio Bidini (born 1968), Italian pianist
