= Vladimir Milošević =

Serbian concert pianist (born 1980)

- Born: Vladimir Milošević; November 5, 1980 (age 45); Leskovac, Serbia, Yugoslavia
- Genres: Classical music
- Occupations: Concert pianist; Professor of Piano, University of Arts in Belgrade
- Instrument: Piano

Vladimir Milošević (Serbian Cyrillic: Bлaдимиp Милошевић, pronounced [ʋlǎdimiːr milǒːʃeʋitɕ]; born 5 November 1980) is a Serbian concert pianist. Milošević's honors include winning numerous international competitions, such as the 2013 Rising Artist Concerto Presentation by the New York Concert Artists & Associates, Concerti in Villa, Nikolai Rubinstein, Rencontre internationale de piano au Mée-sur-Seine, and Torneo internazionale di musica in Marseille.

He has performed as soloist with the Belgrade Philharmonic Orchestra, Symphony Orchestra Radio Television Serbia, Prague State Opera Orchestra, Orquestra Sinfônica de Porto Alegre, Orquestra Sinfónica do Porto Casa da Música, New York Concert Artists & Associates Symphony, Orchestra del Teatro Olimpico, and Montenegrin Symphony Orchestra, among others. Milošević has also given solo recitals in some of the most prestigious venues, including Carnegie Hall in New York, Salle Cortot in Paris, Steinway Hall in London, Konzerthaus in Berlin, Teatro Tivoli in Porto, Konzerthaus in Vienna, Charles Bronfman Auditorium in Tel Aviv, Kolarac Endowment Hall in Belgrade. As an active chamber musician, he has also performed at the Mariinsky Theatre in Saint Petersburg, Le Nouveau Siècle in Lille, and the John F. Kennedy Performing Arts Center in Washington, D.C.

== Early life and education ==
Vladimir Milošević was born in Leskovac, Serbia. He began studying the piano at the age of 8 with Prof. Mila Veljković. He entered the University of Arts in Belgrade at the age of 15, studying with Nevena Popović and completing his undergraduate and master's degrees in piano performance. He continued his postgraduate specialization in Italy at the renowned International Piano Academy "Incontri col Maestro” in Imola, studying with Lazar Berman and Michel Dalberto, and also with Naum Starkmann, François-René Duchâble, and Zoltán Kocsis. In 2022, Milošević completed his Doctoral of Musical Arts Degree at the Faculty of Music, University of Arts in Belgrade with a concert held at the Kolarac Endowment Music Hall.

Milošević is regarded as one of the most notable persons from Leskovac. In 2016, his hometown unveiled a mural in his honor as part of the project, “You, too, can inspire!” (“I ti možeš da inspirišeš!”).

== Career ==
=== Early career ===
In 1997, at the age of 16, Milošević won several prestigious national and international competitions, including Nikolai Rubinstein International Piano Competition in Paris and Petar Konjović Competition in Belgrade. In 1998, he won the first place in “Pietra Ligure” international piano competition (Italy) and fourth prize at the IV International Paderewski Piano Competition in Bydgoszcz (Poland). He also won the first place in Rencontre internationale de piano au Mée-sur-Seine (France) in 2004, and the Torneo internazionale di musica (Marseille) in 2002.

Milošević also won third prize at the Concours Animato in Paris (2005) and the Southern Highlands International Piano Competition in Australia (2009), where he was also awarded the special prize for the best performance of a major Romantic work and the audience prize. He won fourth prize at the International Piano Competition Ciudad do Porto in Portugal (2004), and was a semifinalist in large international competitions, including Clara Haskil in Switzerland (2005), Cleveland International Piano Competition in Ohio, USA (2001), and the International Frederic Chopin Piano Competition in Warsaw, Poland (2000).

Milošević's performances are lauded by the critics in Europe and the United States. After winning the Concerti in Villa Piano Competition (Vicenza, Italy), Milošević made a debut solo recital at Carnegie Hall in New York City in April 2005 and was subsequently featured the same year in the concert cycle, “Velikani muzičke scene – Rising Stars,” in Kolarac Endowment Hall in Belgrade. He has also performed solo recitals in École Normale de Musique de Paris (Paris), Steinway Hall (London), Konzerthaus Berlin (Berlin), Teatro Tivoli (Porto), Konzerthaus, Vienna (Vienna), Charles Bronfman Auditorium (Tel Aviv), and Förster Hall (Prague).

=== Concerto soloist ===
Milošević was proclaimed the Winner of the 2013 Rising Artist Concerto Presentation by the New York Concert Artists & Associates and was featured with NYCA Symphony Orchestra in 2014 at Merkin Concert Hall– Kaufman Music Center in New York City. He has also performed as soloist with the Belgrade Philharmonic Orchestra, Symphony Orchestra Radio Television Serbia, Montenegrin Symphony Orchestra, Prague State Opera Orchestra, Orquestra Sinfônica de Porto Alegre, Orquestra Sinfónica do Porto Casa da Música, Orchestra del Teatro Olimpico, Wollongong Symphony Orchestra, Johannesburg Philharmonic Orchestra, Cape Town Philharmonic Orchestra, Pomeranian Philharmonic, and Orchestre symphonique de Bretagne, among others. He has played under the baton of many notable conductors, including Anton Nanut, János Fürst, Emmanuel Siffert, Darinka Matić-Marović, Jean-Bernard Pommier, Jerzy Maksymiuk, Nurhan Arman, Biljana Radovanović, Martinho Lutero Galati de Oliveira Martinho Lutero Galati, Ori Leshman, Omri Hadari, Romolo Gessi, Carlos Alvarado, and Kiril Stankow, among others.

=== Concert tours ===
In 2011, Milošević toured Australia, performing recitals and giving masterclasses in Sydney, Canberra, and Melbourne. In 2007, he toured South Africa, giving fifteen solo and concerto concerts in venues including Baxter Theatre (Cape Town), Linder Auditorium (Johannesburg), Guy Butler Auditorium (Grahamstown), the University of South Africa (Pretoria), and Oude Libertas Amphitehatre (Stelenbosch). He toured Morocco and Italy in 2003 (Casablanca, Rabat, and Marrakesh; Mola di Bari, Verona, Asolo, Milan, Monfalcone, Rome, and Anticoli Corrado), Brazil in 2002 (Porto Alegre, Pelotas, Sao Jose dos Campos), and Poland (Warsaw, Radom, Ciechanów, and Toruń) in 2000.

=== Music festivals ===
Milošević is regularly invited to participate in the biggest classical music festival in Serbia – the Belgrade Music Festival (“BEMUS”) where, in 2010, his recital marked the anniversaries of Frédéric Chopin and Robert Schumann. At the 2013 Belgrade Chopin Fest, Milošević made a video for “Oh, Mystery,” an arrangement of Chopin's Piano Prelude in Op. 28, No. 4 in E minor, with an iconic Serbian singer and songwriter, Slađana Milošević.

Vladimir Milošević took part in many other important music festivals in Serbia, such as the Fifth International Piano Fest in Subotica, LEDAMUS Festival in Leskovac, Ravanelius Music Festival in Ćuprija, and NIMUS Festival in Niš. He is actively performing in international music festivals in North Macedonia (Ohrid Summer Festival), Arsana Festival in Slovenia, “Dani Vlade Miloševića” Festival in Bosnia and Herzegovina, “Dani Muzike” Festival and KotorArt International Festival in Montenegro, and “Marco Polo” Festival and Večeri na Griču in Croatia.

=== Chamber music ===
Milošević is an active chamber musician, performing regularly with Serbian violinist Stefan Milenkovich in Serbia, Montenegro, Croatia, Slovenia, Bosnia and Herzegovina, North Macedonia, and Italy. He also often performs with Serbian cellist Dragan Djordjević, with whom he toured Serbia, Montenegro, and Croatia. In April 2013 they performed at the Mariinsky Theatre in Saint Petersburg for the International Piano Festival “Contemporary Piano Faces.”

He also collaborated with other musicians throughout Europe, such as flutists János Bálint, Dejan Gavrić, and Katarina Milošević (his sister), violinists Roman Simović, Eric Crambes, and Anyango Yarbo-Davenport, cellists Tim Hugh and Dmitry Prokofiev (performing in Serbia, Montenegro, and Belgium). At Semaines musicales festival in Crans-Montana (2006) Switzerland, Milošević performed piano duo with Michel Dalberto, and at the festival Les pianos de nouveau siècle in Lille, he performed as one of the soloists in Mozart's Concerto for three pianos in F major, No. 7, K. 242 together with Michel Dalberto and Jean-Bernard Pommier, and the Orchestre symphonique de Bretagne.

== Academia ==
Vladimir Milošević is Professor of Piano at the University of Arts in Belgrade, Serbia, the post he has held since 2005.

Milošević is also a celebrated piano pedagogue, who has given master classes in Europe, the Americas, and Australia. In 2019, he was on faculty of the Sixth Season of the Global Summer Institute of Music at the Virginia Commonwealth University (Richmond, Virginia), followed by a series of master classes at Emory University (Atlanta, Georgia).

Milošević frequently serves as a judge in international piano competitions, including Pjeter Gaci International Piano Competition (Shkodër, Albania), International Piano Competition Torneo Internazionale di Musica (Paris, France), International Piano Competition Davorin Jenko (Serbia), Emory University Young Artist Piano Competition (Atlanta, USA), and numerous national and international competitions in Serbia.
