= Valentina Igoshina =

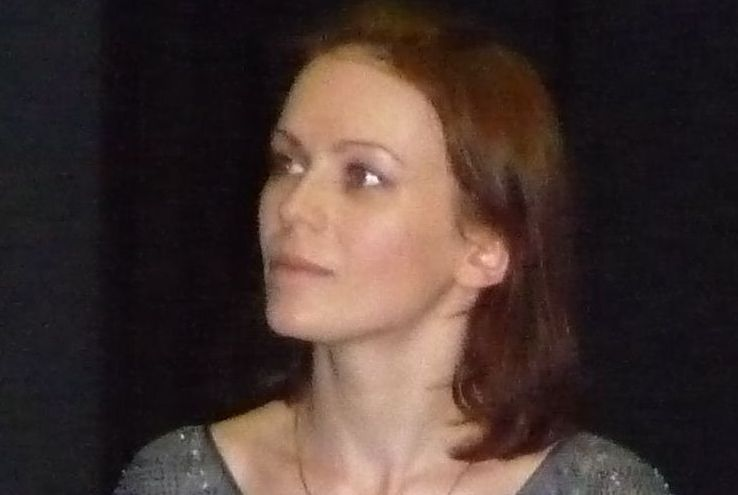
- Valentina Igoshina

Background information
- Born: 4 November 1978 (age 46) Bryansk, Bryansk Oblast, Russian SFSR, Soviet Union
- Origin: Russia
- Genres: classical
- Occupation: classical pianist
- Instrument: piano
- Labels: Warner Classics International
- Website: www.valentina-igoshina.com

Valentina Igoshina (born 4 November 1978 in Bryansk, Bryansk Oblast) is a Russian classical pianist. She has won several international piano competitions.

== Biography ==
Valentina Igoshina began studying piano with her mother, and first took lessons at home at the age of four. At the age of twelve she began attending the Moscow Central School of Music for gifted students and became a pupil of Sergei Dorensky and Larissa Dedova at the Moscow Tchaikovsky Conservatory.

Igoshina has also served as a teacher of piano at the Moscow Tchaikovsky Conservatory in Moscow. Currently she is a professor at the Royal Conservatory of Brussels and at the Conservatoire Maurice Ravel in Paris. She has lived in France for the past two decades, and travels extensively for concerts and recitals.

== Professional accomplishments ==
In 1993, at age 14, she won first prize at the Arthur Rubinstein Piano Competition in Bydgoszcz, Poland. In 1997, at age 18, she won first prize and a special award at the famed Rachmaninov International Piano Competition in Moscow. In 2000, she was given an honorable mention at the XIV International Chopin Piano Competition.

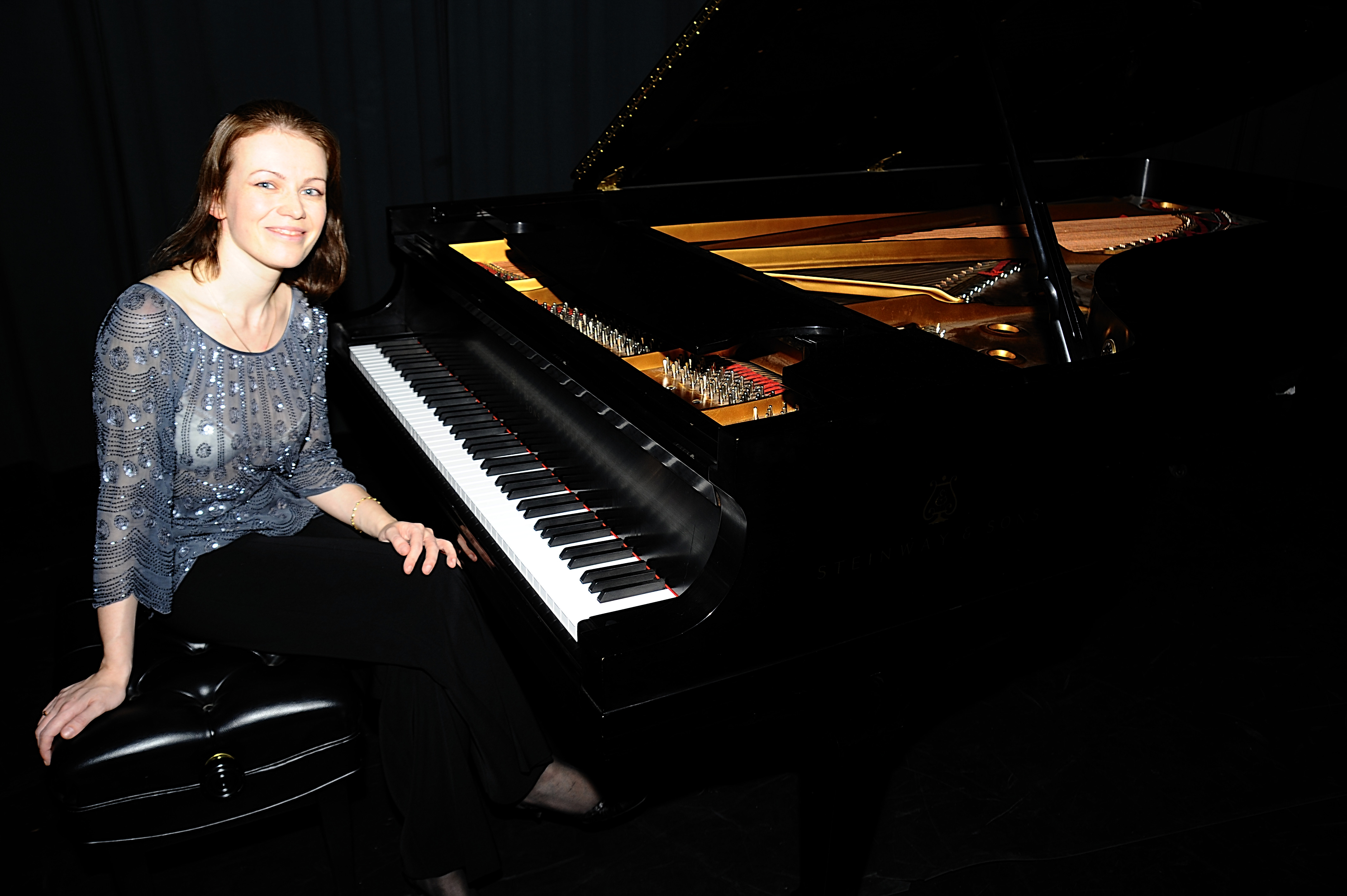
Igoshina at the piano

Igoshina has also competed in four other worldwide piano competitions:

- Second place at the Atlanta International Piano Competition (2002), Georgia
- First place at the Concorso Pianistico Internazionale "Premio Giuliano Pecar" (2002), Italy
- Laureate at the Queen Elisabeth Competition in Brussels, (2003)
- Second place at the José Iturbi International Piano Competition (2006), Valencia, Spain

Igoshina appears on the list of great women pianists as compiled at forte-piano-pianissimo.com.

== Festival and major orchestral appearances ==
Igoshina has been invited to play with many notable orchestras, among them:

- Royal Concertgebouw Orchestra in Amsterdam, Markus Stenz conducting
- BBC Scottish Symphony Orchestra in Aberdeen, Alexander Titov conducting
- Hallé Orchestra in Manchester, United Kingdom, Sir Mark Elder conducting
- Melbourne Symphony Orchestra in Australia, Markus Stenz conducting
- Orquestra Simfònica de Barcelona ì Nacional de Catalunya, Josep Caballé Domenech conducting
- Orquesta Filarmónica de Santiago in Chile, Jan Latham-Koenig conducting
- London Philharmonic, Carl Davis conducting
- Macao Orchestra in Macao, China, Lü Jia conducting
- Warsaw Philharmonic Orchestra, Antoni Wit conducting
- Orquestra Sinfônica Municipal de São Paulo, Josè Maria Florêncio conducting
- Real Filharmonia de Galicia, Antoni Ros-Marba conducting
- Orchestre Royal de Chambre de Wallonie, Augustin Dumay conducting
- Brandenburg Symphony Orchestra, Takao Ukigaya conducting
- Polish National Radio Symphony Orchestra, Michal Klauza conducting

Igoshina has appeared on multiple occasions with several of the foregoing orchestras. Additionally, she worked both in Russia and Italy with Alexander Vedernikov during his tenure at the Bolshoi Theatre. She has performed in the Great Hall of Moscow Conservatory. Igoshina has also appeared with orchestras in Kraków, Poland; Sacramento, California; Gdansk, Poland; St. Louis, Missouri (Robert Hart Baker conducting); Saint-Etienne, France; Tokyo, Japan; Moscow, St Petersburg, and Bryansk in Russia; Sofia, Bulgaria; Budapest, Hungary (Izaki Masahiro conducting); and many other venues. She has often served as a judge of piano competitions at venues throughout Europe and elsewhere.

She has also participated in numerous recitals and musical festivals; a few are listed as follows:

- Tonhalle, Zurich
- La Società dei Concerti, Milan
- Ravello Festival, Italy
- Duszniki Zdroj Chopin Festival, Poland
- Belem Festival, Lisbon
- Radio France-Montpellier, France
- Festival de La Roque-d'Anthéron, Provence, France
- Harrod's International Piano Series, Queen Elizabeth Hall, London
- Styriarte, Graz, Austria
- Povoa de Varzim Festival, Portugal
- Association "Musique au Pays de George Sand", Nohant-Vic, France
- Nuits Musicales d'Uzès, Uzès, France
- Ohrid Summer Festival, Macedonia
- Théâtre de l'Athénée, Paris
- Piano-en-Valois Festival, Angoulême, France
- Cercle de l'Union interalliee, Paris
- Théâtre du Châtelet, Paris
- Piano aux Jacobins Festival International, Toulouse
- Polish Baltic Philharmonic Hall, Gdansk
- Mons, Belgium with Augustin Dumay
- St. Louis, Missouri with violinists Michael Ludwig and David Halen
- Les Musicales de l'Eure Festival, Pacy-sur-Eure, France
- Auditorium du Conservatoire Maurice Ravel, Paris
- Vaud, Switzerland and Gagnac-sur-Cère, France with cellist Mark Drobinsky
- Tokyo Bunka Kaikan Hall, Tokyo, Japan with flutist Junko Ukigaya
- Académie internationale d'été de Nice, France
- Chandigarh, India, Taj Palace Hall, featuring Tchaikovsky music
- Ann Arbor, Michigan, Recital at the University of Michigan

== Recordings ==
Igoshina has made live recordings on BBC Radio 3, ABC Classic FM, and BBC Scotland, as well as the sound tracks for Tony Palmer's movies The Harvest of Sorrow (also working on the project were Valery Gergiev and Mikhail Pletnev) and The Strange Case of Delphina Potocka. She played one of the leading roles in the latter film.

In 2006 Warner Classics International produced an album entitled Valentina Igoshina, wherein she played works by Modest Mussorgsky and Robert Schumann. Included on the album were Mussorgsky's Pictures at an Exhibition and Schumann's Carnaval.

In 2008 Igoshina recorded a work of the waltzes of Frédéric Chopin. The album, entitled Chopin: Complete Waltzes was chosen by Classic FM Magazine as its November 2008 "Disc of the Month". It was produced by Lontano Music and distributed by Warner Classics International.

In October 2010 Igoshina recorded Dmitri Shostakovich's First and Second Piano Concertos with the Deutsche Kammerakademie Neuss-am-Rhein (near Düsseldorf), and the work is distributed by Warner Classics International. Also in 2010, she appeared in another of Tony Palmer's productions, entitled Valentina Igoshina Plays Chopin. A review by the Los Angeles Times stated, "After this you will never be able to hear the music of Chopin in the same way again."

In 2013 RS Real Sound Productions' 'EXcellence' Series recorded Igoshina playing "Corelli Variations" and "Preludes" by Sergei Rachmaninov and Frédéric Chopin respectively.

In 2018 Antes Edition released Kammermusik für Flöte und Klavier with Igoshina and Junko Ukigaya, which featured music of Antonín Dvořák, Sergei Prokofiev and César Franck.

Many of Igoshina's performances can be seen on YouTube, including Chopin's Fantaisie Impromptu and Liszt's Liebesträume. Her performances have exceeded a million views on that medium. Igoshina speaks fluent English, French and Russian.
