= Macao Orchestra =

Chinese orchestra

The Macao Orchestra, also known as the Macau Orchestra (Portuguese: Orquestra de Macau, Chinese: 澳門樂團), is a professional orchestra based in Macau. Consisting of approximately 60 members from Asia, Europe, North America and Australia, the orchestra performs symphonic, chamber, and educational concerts around Macau. The orchestra also tours mainland China two to three times per year and performed in Jakarta in 2007.

In Macau, the orchestra performs at the Macao Cultural Centre, San Domingo Church, Macau Tower and Dom Pedro V Theatre. The orchestra is run as a division of the Macau Cultural Institute (Instituto Cultural), the arts division of the Macau government.

Formed in 1983 by Father Aureo de Castro as the Macao Chamber Orchestra, the orchestra underwent a series of reviews and expansions, becoming a full-time professional ensemble in 2003. The current Musical Director and Principal conductor is Lü Jia (呂嘉), who has held this position since the beginning of the 2008–09. Lü Jia's predecessor, En Shao (邵恩) (2003–2008), was the first Music Director and Principal Conductor of the Macao Orchestra in its present form.

Soloists who have appeared with the orchestra include Lang Lang, Yundi, Valentina Igoshina and Pinchas Zukerman.
