= Mihaela Ursuleasa =

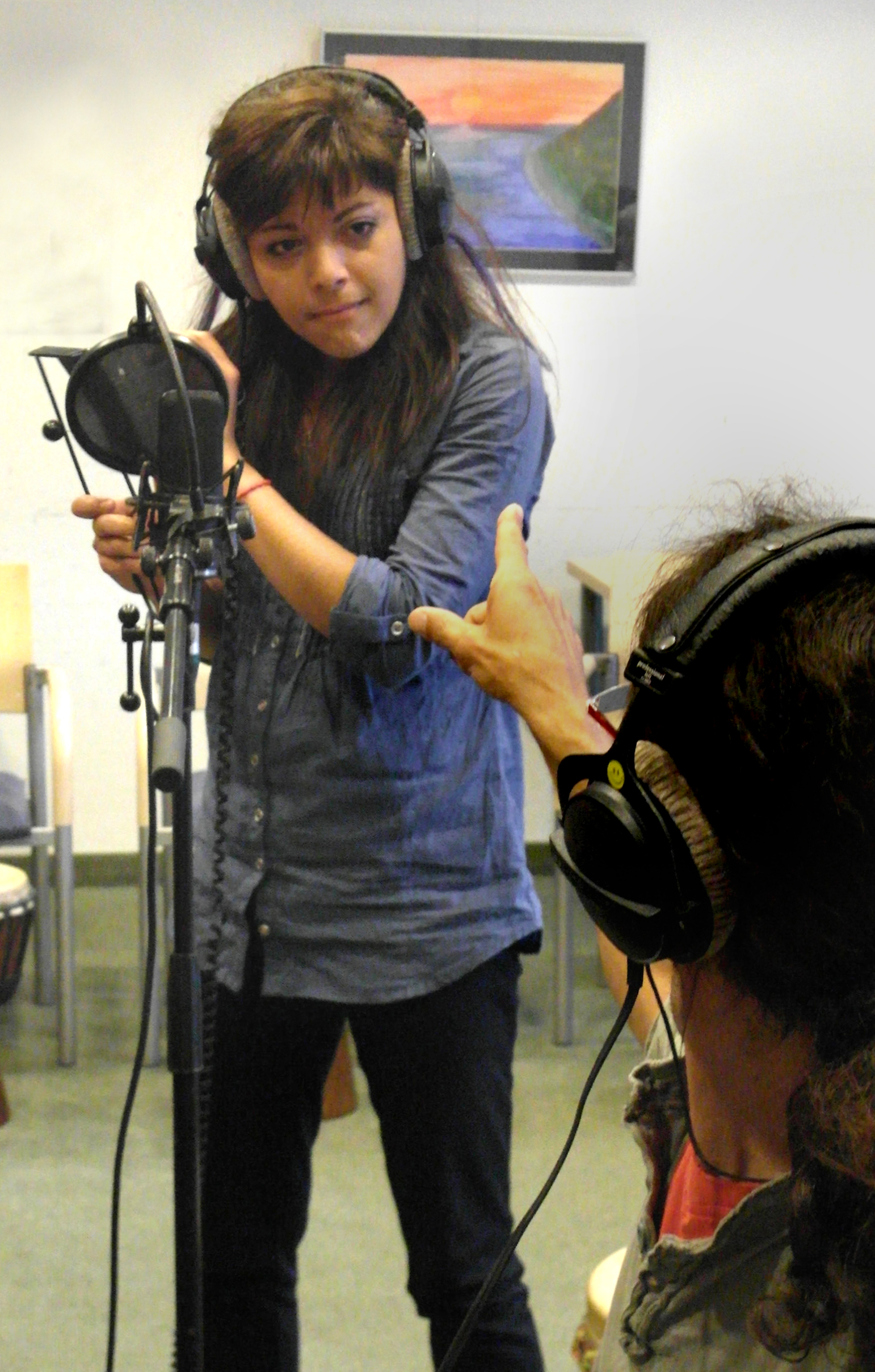
- Ursuleasa during a recording session in 2011

Background information
- Born: Mihaela Ursuleasa; 27 September 1978; Brașov, Romania
- Died: 2 August 2012 (aged 33) Vienna, Austria
- Genres: classical, chamber
- Occupation: concert pianist
- Instrument: Piano
- Years active: 1995–2012
- Website: ursuleasa.com

Mihaela Ursuleasa (27 September 1978 – 2 August 2012) was a Romanian concert pianist. In 1995, she won the Clara Haskil International Piano Competition.

== Biography ==
Ursuleasa began playing the piano at the age of five under the tutelage of her Romani father, a jazz musician. In 1990, at the age of 12, she obtained a grant to study in Vienna. She went on to perform at Carnegie Hall, with the Rundfunk-Sinfonieorchester in Berlin, with the Orchestre National de France, as well as with the London Philharmonic Orchestra.

In 2000, she received an honorable mention at the XIV International Chopin Piano Competition.

In 2010, she was awarded the Echo Klassik award for her debut album Piano & Forte. She released her second album, Romanian Rhapsody in 2011.

=== Death ===
Ursuleasa was found dead in her Vienna home on 2 August 2012 of a cerebral hemorrhage. She was 33. She is interred at the Bellu Cemetery in Bucharest.

Ursuleasa was memorialised by her musician colleagues, such as the violist, Maxim Rysanov, who paid homage to Ursuleasa with his 2012 album "PAVANE" and reckoned her as a wonderful musician and a very special person.

== Discography ==
=== Solo albums ===
- 2010: Piano & Forte (Berlin Classics)
  - featuring Ludwig van Beethoven's 32 variations on an original theme, WoO 80; Johannes Brahms' Three Intermezzi, Op. 117; Maurice Ravel's Gaspard de la nuit; Alberto Ginastera's first piano sonata, Op. 22; and Paul Constantinescu's Joc dobrogean
- 2011: Romanian Rhapsody (Berlin Classics)—featuring violinist Gilles Apap.
  - featuring George Enescu's Romanian Rhapsody No. 1, Op. 11, No. 1; Paul Constantinescu's Suite for Piano; Franz Schubert's Three Piano Pieces, D.946; Béla Bartók's Two Romanian Dances, Op. 8a, Sz. 43, and Rhapsody for Violin and Piano No. 2, Sz. 90.

=== Ensemble albums ===
- 1995: XVIth Clara Haskil Competition 1995 with the Orchestre De Chambre De Lausanne & Jesus Lopez-Cobos, conducting. (Claves Records)
  - featuring Wolfgang Amadeus Mozart's Piano Concerto No. 9 in E-flat Major, K. 271, "Jeunehomme" and Ludwig van Beethoven's Piano Concerto No. 5 in E-flat Major, Op. 73, "Emperor".
- 2010: Patricia Kopatchinskaja: Rapsodia (Naïve)--featuring violinist Patricia Kopatchinskaja, cimbalomist Viktor Kopatchinsky, violinist Emilia Kopatchinskaja, pianist Mihaela Ursuleasa
