= Alexander Kobrin =

Russian concert pianist and teacher (born 1980)

- Александр Кобрин
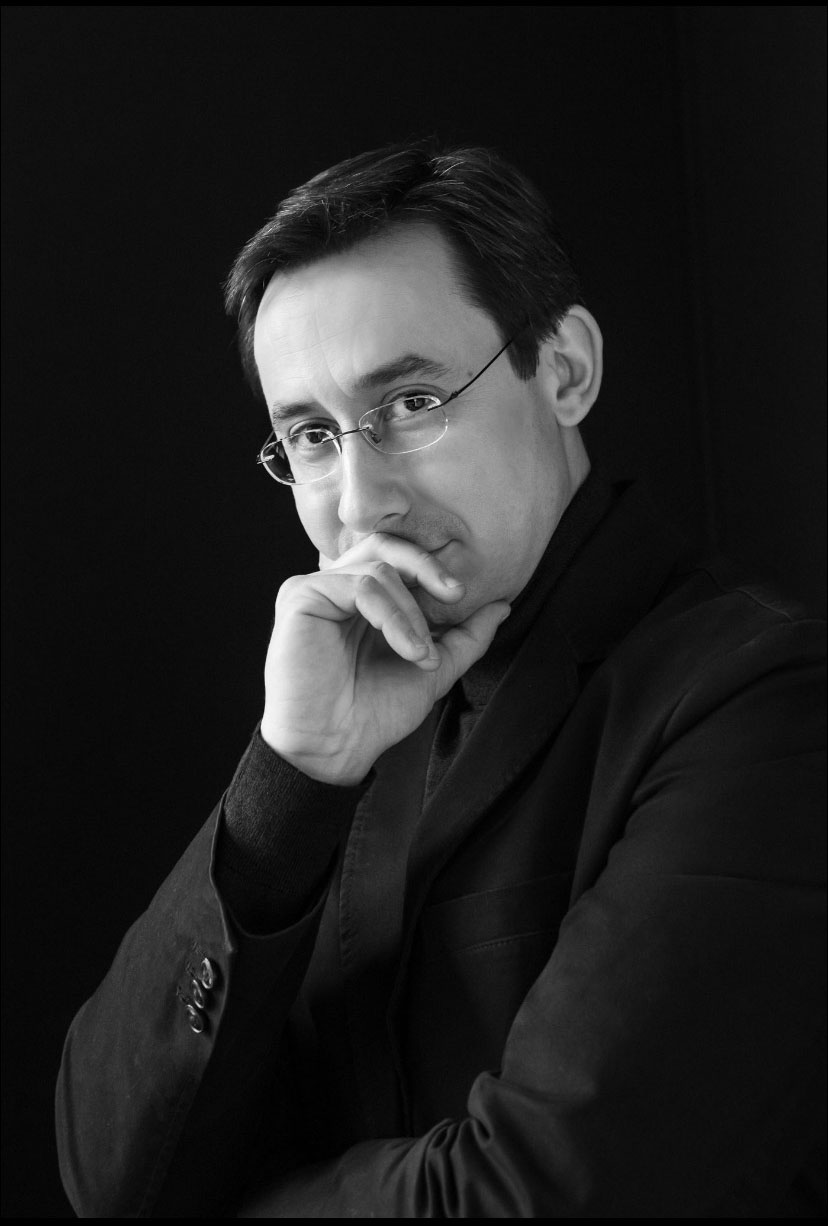
- Born: Alexander Yevgenyevich Kobrin; 20 March 1980 (age 46); Moscow, Russian SFSR, Soviet Union
- Education: Moscow Tchaikovsky Conservatory
- Occupations: pianist; teacher
- Awards: (gold) Scottish International Piano Competition 1998; (gold) Ferruccio Busoni International Piano Competition 1999; (bronze) XIV International Chopin Piano Competition 2000; (gold) Hamamatsu International Piano Competition 2003; (gold) Van Cliburn International Piano Competition 2005
- Musical career
- Genres: classical music
- Instrument: piano
- Years active: 1999–present
- Website: www.alexanderkobrin.org

Alexander Yevgenyevich Kobrin (Russian: Александр Евгеньевич Кобрин; born March 20, 1980) is a Russian-American music teacher and pianist.

== Early life ==
At the age of five, he enrolled in the Gnessin Special School of Music, where his primary teacher was Tatiana Zelikman. At the age of eighteen, he re-enrolled at the Moscow Tchaikovsky Conservatory as a student of Lev Naumov and later earned a graduate degree from the institution.

== Awards ==
Kobrin won his first competition, The Scottish International Piano Competition, when he was 18. The next year, in 1999, he won the Busoni Competition. In 2000, Kobrin took third at the XIV International Chopin Piano Competition in Warsaw. In 2003, Kobrin won the top prize at Japan's Hamamatsu competition.

In June 2005, he won The Van Cliburn International Piano Competition. Among his prizes included a $20,000 cash award, a compact disc recording, concert tours, professional management both in the United States and Europe, a professional attire stipend, and subsidized travel in the United States.

== Other notable performances ==
Before his Van Cliburn victory, Kobrin performed with the Moscow Virtuosi, the Orchestre de la Suisse Romande, the Virtuosi of Salzburg Chamber Orchestra, the Moscow State Symphony Orchestra, the Rio de Janeiro Symphonic Orchestra, the English Chamber Orchestra, and the Osaka and Tokyo Symphony Orchestras. Since then, he has performed with other orchestras, including the New York Philharmonic, Royal Liverpool Philharmonic, Dallas Symphony Orchestra, and others.

== Recordings ==
Kobrin has recorded an all-Chopin compact disc, along with the compact disc of some of his performances at the Van Cliburn competition.

Quartz Music and Centaur Records have produced recordings by Kobrin, including his most recent Complete Chopin Sonatas album. As of January 2026, he has released recordings of all 32 Beethoven sonatas with Centaur, available on streaming platforms such as apple music and spotify.

== Later life ==
Kobrin taught at the Gnessin State Academy of Music in Moscow until the fall of 2009, when he relocated to the United States. He has taught at the Schwob School of Music at Columbus State University and the Steinhardt School of Culture, Education, and Human Development at New York University. Kobrin joined the piano faculty at the Eastman School of Music in the fall of 2017. Later, in the fall of 2023, Kobrin joined the faculty at Università della Svizzera Italiana in the continuing education piano department. He continues to perform, mainly as a soloist and chamber musician, and frequently appears as a jury member at international piano competitions.
