= Lukas Sternath =

Austrian classical pianist (born 2001)

- Born: 2001 (age 24–25); Vienna, Austria
- Education: University of Music and Performing Arts Vienna; Hochschule für Musik, Theater und Medien Hannover
- Occupation: Classical pianist

Lukas Sternath (born 2001) is an Austrian classical pianist who made an international career as a recitalist, in chamber music and as a soloist with orchestras.

== Life and career ==
Sternath was born in Vienna in 2001. Growing up as an only child, he took piano lessons from age five. As a boy he was a member of the Wiener Sängerknaben, appearing on international tours in Europe, the Americas and Asia. He studied piano at the University of Music and Performing Arts Vienna with Anna Malikova and Alma Sauer. He has studied from 2022 at the Hochschule für Musik, Theater und Medien Hannover with Igor Levit. He was inspired also in master classes with Till Fellner, Ingolf Wunder and András Schiff.

At the 71th ARD International Music Competition in Munich in 2022, Sternath won first prize and also seven special distinction including the audience prize and an award for the best interpretation of a commissioned composition. He has performed at the Wiener Musikverein, the Wiener Konzerthaus, at Schloss Johannisberg and at the Klavier-Festival Ruhr. He has collaborated with cellist Julia Hagen in recitals in Europe, and with Levit in concert in London. In the 2024/25 season he appeared at the Salzburg Festival with Mozarteum Orchestra Salzburg conducted by Ádám Fischer.

== Awards ==
- 2021: 63rd Ferruccio Busoni International Piano Competition, third prize
- 2021: 14th Internationaler Schubert-Wettbewerb Dortmund
- 2021: 17th Europäischer Klavierwettbewerb in Bremen
- 2023: Osnabrücker Musikpreis
- 2022: ARD International Music Competition: first prize
