= Impromptu No. 1 (Chopin) =

1837 piano composition by Chopin

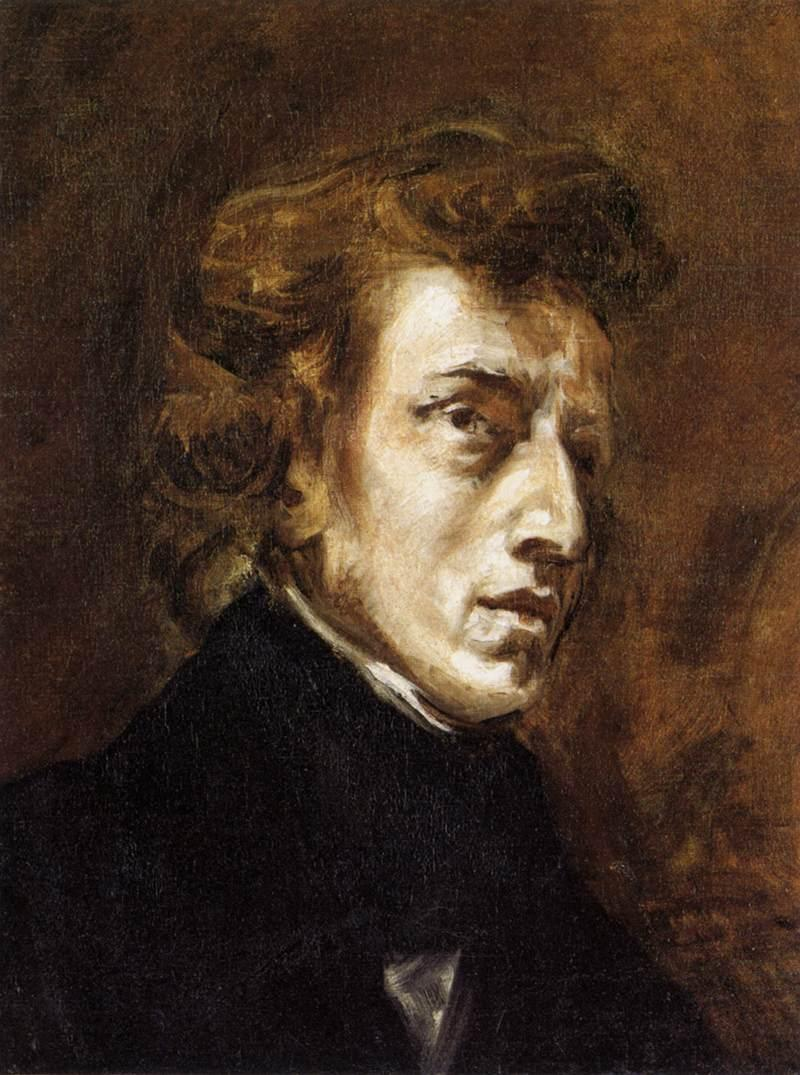
Chopin in 1838

Impromptu No. 1 in A♭ major, Op. 29
Performed by Frank Levy

Frédéric Chopin's Impromptu No. 1 in A♭ major, Op. 29, was composed in 1837. The impromptu is in ternary form (ABA), the middle being in the key of F minor. A perpetuum mobile in triplets accompanies the piece.

In George du Maurier's novel Trilby, the title character, a singer who can perform only under the influence of hypnosis, performs the Impromptu in A♭ major as a wordless vocalise to end her concerts.
