= Alberto Nosè =

Italian pianist

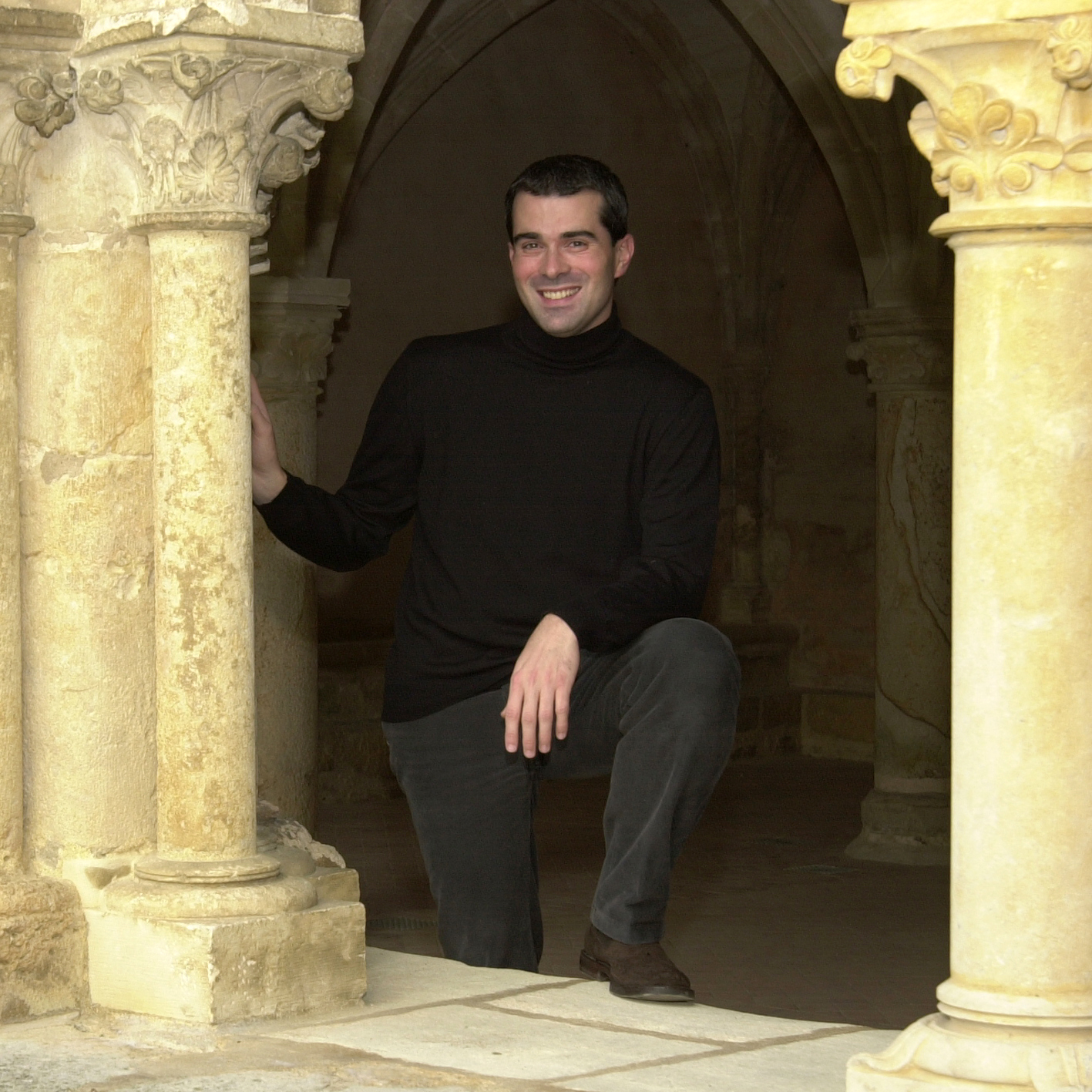
Alberto Nosè

Alberto Nosè (born 1979) is an Italian pianist.

== Biography ==
Born in Villafranca di Verona, Italy, in 1979, Alberto Nosé studied at the Verona Conservatory F. E. Dall’Abaco. He continued his studies with Franco Scala, Boris Petrushansky and Leonid Margarius at the International Piano Academy Incontri col Maestro in Imola.

In 2005, Alberto Nosé won the Gran Prize and the Audience Prize of the Paloma O'Shea Santander International Piano Competition. At age of 11 Nosé won the First Prize in the Jugend für Mozart International Competition in Salzburg, then he won the 5th prize of the XIV International Chopin Piano Competition, Second Prize of the 1999 Ferruccio Busoni Competition in Bolzano, First prize of the 2000 Paris Vendôme, First Prize of the 2002 Helsinki International Maj Lind competition, Second Prize at the 2002 London World Piano Competition. and First Prize of the Top of the World Competition 2011 in Tromsø

He has performed throughout Europe, Asia and the United States major festivals and concert halls including the Wigmore Hall, Carnegie Hall, Queen Elisabeth Hall, Royal Festival Hall, Théâtre du Châtelet, Salle Pleyel, Salzburg's Mozarteum concert hall, Suntory Hall in Tokyo, Teatro La Fenice. Nosé has collaborated in chamber music with the Ysaÿe Quartet, and appeared as soloist with orchestras such as the London Philharmonic, English Chamber Orchestra, European Union Chamber Orchestra, Orchestre Philharmonique de Radio France, Warsaw Philharmonic, RTVE Symphony Orchestra, Finnish Radio Symphony, Orquesta Sinfonica de Tenerife, Orquesta Sinfonica de Galicia and the New Japan Philharmonic. Alberto Nosé has recorded for Naxos.
