= Matthias Fletzberger =

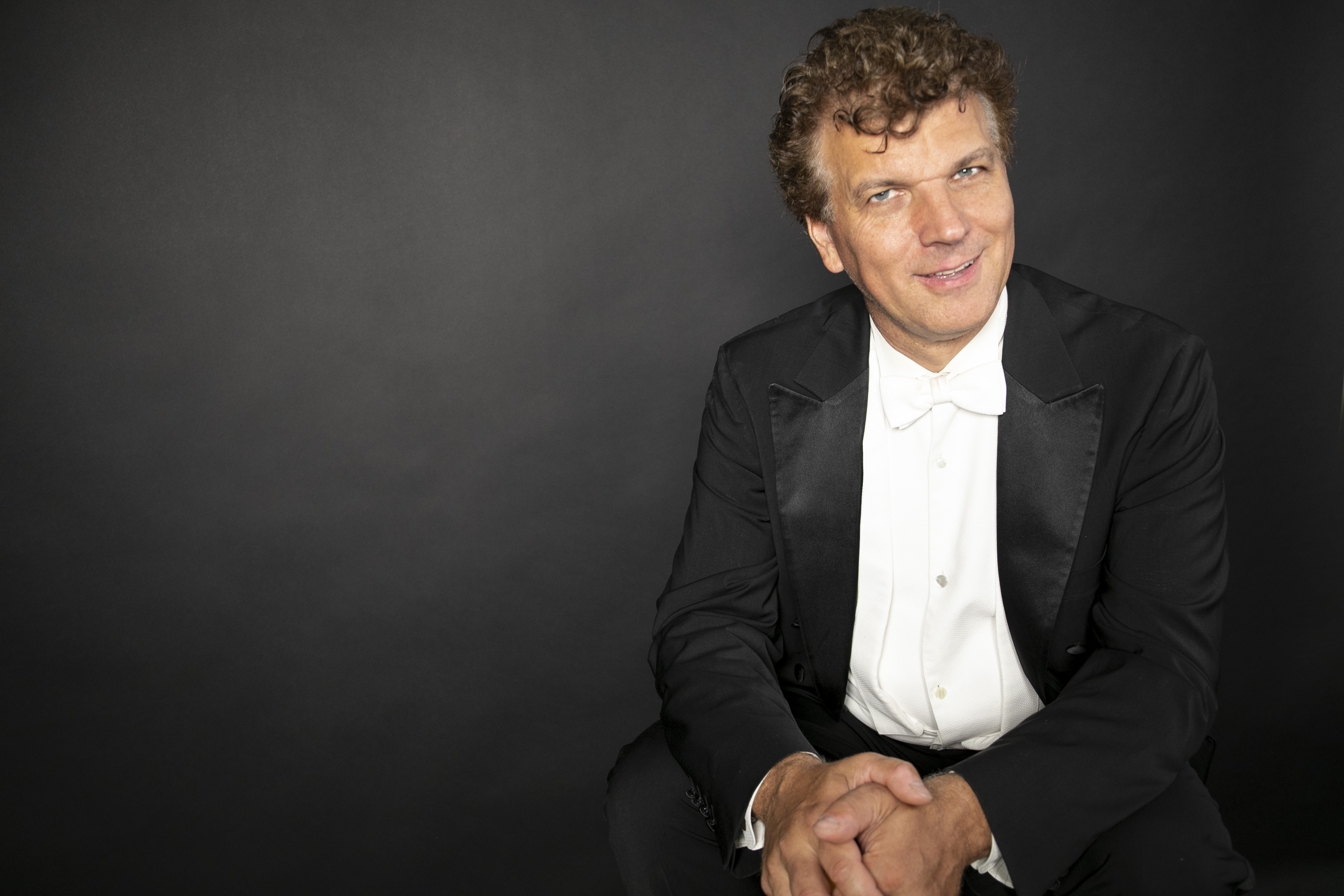
- Matthias Fletzberger, 2022

Background information
- Born: August 24, 1965 (age 60); Vienna, Austria
- Occupations: conductor and pianist
- Years active: 1983–present

Matthias Fletzberger (born 1965 in Vienna) is an Austrian classical conductor and pianist.

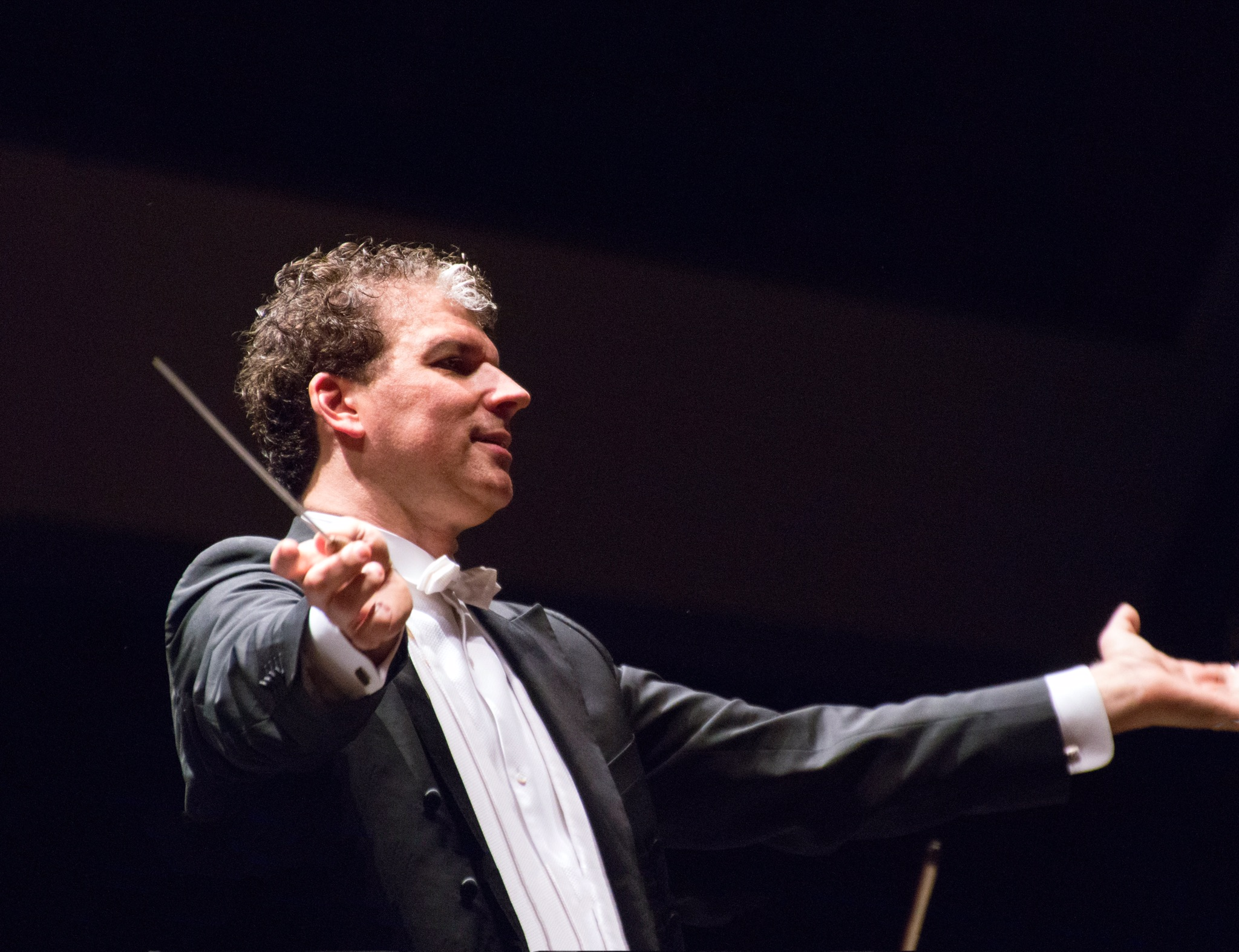
Matthias Fletzberger Conducting in Toronto, 2017

== Biography ==
Born in Vienna, Matthias Fletzberger was accepted at the age of 5 as a student of the University of Music and Performing Arts Vienna. Aged 12, he won the first prize at the Austrian Youth Competition "Jugend musiziert" and was accepted to the concert class of Hans Graf, where he obtained his diploma with special distinction. Further teachers include Bruno Seidlhofer, Tatiana Nikolayeva, Jacques Rouvier, Nicole Henriot-Schweitzer and Leon Fleisher. While still a student, Fletzberger won prizes at international piano competitions, including the Busoni, Rubinstein, and Bösendorfer competitions.

By recommendation of Rolf Liebermann and Elisabeth Schwarzkopf Fletzberger started a second career as an opera conductor. He worked as répétiteur in Salzburg and at the Prague State Opera, as musical director of opera productions at the Vienna Festival, and as Kapellmeister at Theater St. Gallen. Following several years as general manager of the Sofiensäle – Vienna’s oldest and largest venue for cultural events – where he presented a broadly varied programme of opera, musical and theatre presentations as well as galas, incentives, parties and clubbing events, he decided to return to the classical music scene.

Since 2008 Fletzberger performs again both as a conductor and as a pianist (as soloist, Lied accompanist, and chamber music pianist). In 2011 Deutsche Grammophon released the CD/DVD album Violin in Motion featuring arrangements by Lidia Baich and Matthias Fletzberger of well-known ballets. His North American debut as a conductor was in January 2013 within the "Salute to Vienna" concert series in Montreal and Quebec.

In the years 2017 and 2018 he developed the musical concept for "Fascination Wagner" together with stage and filmproducer Selcuk Cara for the Austrian Tenor Andreas Schager; the world premiere was staged in Prague in cooperation with the Národní divadlo Praha in October 2018. From 2018 to 2020 he is the conductor of the first South-Korean production of Wagner's "Ring-Cycle" in Seoul Arts Center, staged by Achim Freyer.

== Prizes and awards ==
- "Jugend musiziert", Leoben 1977 (1st prize)
- Ferruccio Busoni International Piano Competition, Bolzano 1984 (2nd prize and silver medal)
- Arthur Rubinstein International Piano Master Competition, Tel Aviv 1986 (4th prize and gold medal)
- Paloma O'Shea International Piano Competition, 1987 (5th prize)
- Concours International d'Exécution Musicale "Dr. Luis Sigall", Chile 1987 (2nd prize)
- Maria Callas Grand Prix, Athens 1988 (2nd prize)
- Bösendorfer Piano Competition, Vienna 1988 (1st prize)

== Recordings ==
- Violin in Motion, CD/DVD 4764638 DG (2011), Universal Music / Deutsche Grammophon, ASIN: B005S5NBXU
- Comeback-Recital, CD 91201 PR (2012), Preiser Records
- Lat(e) Romantics, CD 91255 PR (2014), Preiser Records
