= Anna Kravtchenko =

Italian-Ukrainian concert pianist (born 1976)

- Occupations: Pianist: Accademia Pianistica Internazionale, Imola, Italy

Anna Kravtchenko is an Italian classical pianist. She won the Busoni competition in 1992 and has been a piano Professor al the Conservatorio della Svizzera Italiana in Lugano since 2013.

== Early life ==
Kravtchenko began learning piano at age five; she recalls "the great joy of being able to construct a phrase in a certain way and discovering unique sounds". She studied in Italy at the Accademia Pianistica Internazionale in Imola.

== Career ==
In 1991, she won first prize at the international competition Concertino di Praga. A year later, at age 16, she won the Ferruccio Busoni International Piano Competition, which had not given its First Prize to any pianist for five years. She since had an international concert career, and recorded works by Frédéric Chopin and Franz Liszt for Decca.

Kravtchenko performed at the Concertgebouw of Amsterdam, Musikverein Golden Hall in Vienna, Herculesshall in Munich, with the BBC Philharmonic Orchestra, Bayerische Rundfunk Orchestra, London Simphony Orchestra, to name few. Geoffrey Norris of The Telegraph said she played it "in a way that thoroughly warmed the heart and thrilled the senses", and explained:

She incorporated Chopin's decorative writing into a vision of the concerto that had cohesion, vitality and fluency. The poetic reverie of the slow movement was set against the glistening roulades of the outer ones in a performance that, with justification, showed complete confidence in what it wanted to say, and knew how to express it eloquently.

Kravtchenko won the International Web Concert Hall Competition in 2006. Since 2013, she has taught piano at the Conservatorio della Svizzera Italiana in Lugano, in the Italian-speaking Swiss canton of Ticino.
