= Hai-Kyung Suh =

South Korean pianist (born 1960)

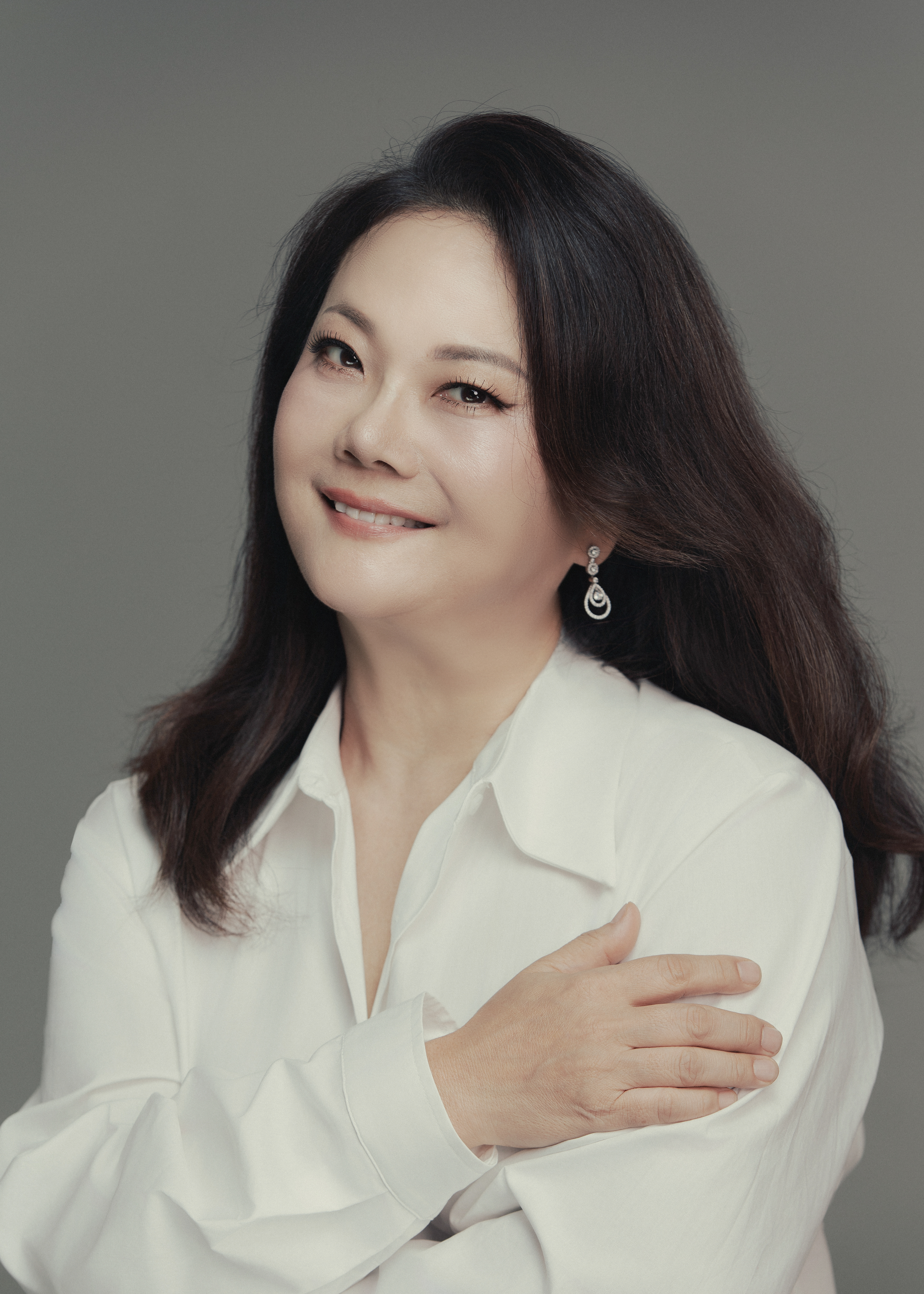
- Hai-Kyung Suh

Background information
- Born: March 7, 1960 (age 66)
- Origin: South Korea
- Occupation: Classical pianist
- Years active: 1965–present
- Website: www.haikyungsuh.org

Hai-Kyung Suh (Korean: 서혜경; Hanja: 徐彗景; born March 7, 1960) is a South Korean classical pianist living in New York. She is known for her rich, round tone, and singing voice-like phrasing, characteristics of the Romantic style of piano playing that was predominant in the Golden Age of pianism.

== Early life and education ==
Suh was born in Seoul, Korea. She started playing the piano at the age of five, and made her orchestra debut at the age of 11, with the National Symphony Orchestra of Korea, performing Mozart's Piano Concerto No.21. After studying in Japan with Kiyoko Tanaka, she moved to New York at the age of 15 to continue her studies first at the Mannes College of Music with Nadia Reisenberg, and then at the Juilliard School with Sascha Gorodnitzki. In 1980, Suh won the top prize in the Ferruccio Busoni International Piano Competition, and the third prize in the ARD International Music Competition in 1983.

== Career ==
Suh has performed with orchestras including the Philadelphia Orchestra, Pittsburgh Symphony, Philharmonia, London Philharmonic, Frankfurt Radio Symphony, Berlin Symphony, Stuttgart Radio Symphony, Budapest Festival, Slovak Radio Symphony, Moscow Philharmonic, Moscow State Symphony, Saint Petersburg Academic Symphony, Osaka Philharmonic, Tokyo Symphony, Nagoya Philharmonic, Shanghai Symphony, KBS Symphony, and the Seoul Philharmonic. She has worked with conductors such as Riccardo Muti, Charles Dutoit, Ivan Fischer, Dmitri Kitayenko, Pavel Kogan, Aleksandr Dmitriyev, Franz Welser-Möst, Gerd Albrecht, Gianluigi Gelmetti, Moshe Atzmon, Takashi Asahina, Long Yu, and Myung-Whun Chung.

Suh gave her US debut recital at Lincoln Center in 1985 as the winner of the William Petschek Prize, and was one of 25 world renowned pianists invited to perform at a Carnegie Hall gala concert commemorating Steinway & Sons' 135th anniversary.

Although Suh is especially noted for her performances of the works of Russian Romantic composers such as Mussorgsky, Tchaikovsky, and Rachmaninov, her repertoire ranges from Mozart through Beethoven, Chopin, Liszt, Schumann, Brahms, to Debussy and Ravel, and contemporary composers such as Lowell Liebermann.

Suh has recorded the complete piano concerti of Tchaikovsky and Rachmaninov with Aleksandr Dmitriyev and the Saint Petersburg Academic Symphony Orchestra, and four Mozart piano concerti with Sir Neville Marriner and the Academy of St Martin in the Fields. Her discography also includes solo piano works by Beethoven, Chopin, Liszt, Mussorgsky, Scriabin, and Stravinsky.

== Discography ==
- 1989 Suh Hai-Kyung Plays Beethoven – Piano Sonatas Nos.21 & 23 / Rondo in C Major Op.51-1 / Polonaise in C Major Op.89 / Für Elise WoO59 (Deutsche Grammophon)
- 2002 Mussorgsky Pictures at an Exhibition / Stravinsky Petrouchka / Scriabin Piano Sonata No.5 (Arcadia)
- 2004 Chopin 12 Etudes Op.25 / Liszt 6 Grand Etudes of Paganini (Universal Music)
- 2006 Jewels for Piano. Pieces of Bach, Chopin, Beethoven, Rachmaninov, Schubert, MacDowell, Weber, Liszt, and Gluck (Universal Music)
- 2009 Nacht und Träume. Pieces of Schubert, Schumann, Chopin, Tchaikovsky, Mendelssohn, Liszt, Grieg, Brahms, Field, de Falla, and Debussy (Universal Music)
- 2010 Rachmaninov Complete Piano Concertos / Rhapsody on a Theme of Paganini; Saint Petersburg Academic Symphony Orchestra; conductor Alexander Dmitriev (Deutsche Grammophon)
- 2012 Tchaikovsky The Complete Works for Piano and Orchestra; Saint Petersburg Academic Symphony Orchestra; conductor Alexander Dmitriev (Deutsche Grammophon)
- 2016 Mozart Piano Concertos Nos.19/20/21/23; Academy of Saint Martin in the Fields; conductor Sir Neville Marriner (Deutsche Grammophon)
- 2019 Sound Paintings. L. Liebermann Gargoyles / Debussy Images Book I, 2 Preludes, L'Isle joyeuse / Mussorgsky Pictures at an Exhibition (Deutsche Grammophon)
