= Joaquín Achúcarro =

Basque Spanish classical pianist (born 1932)

Joaquín Achúcarro (born November 1, 1932) is a Spanish classical pianist.

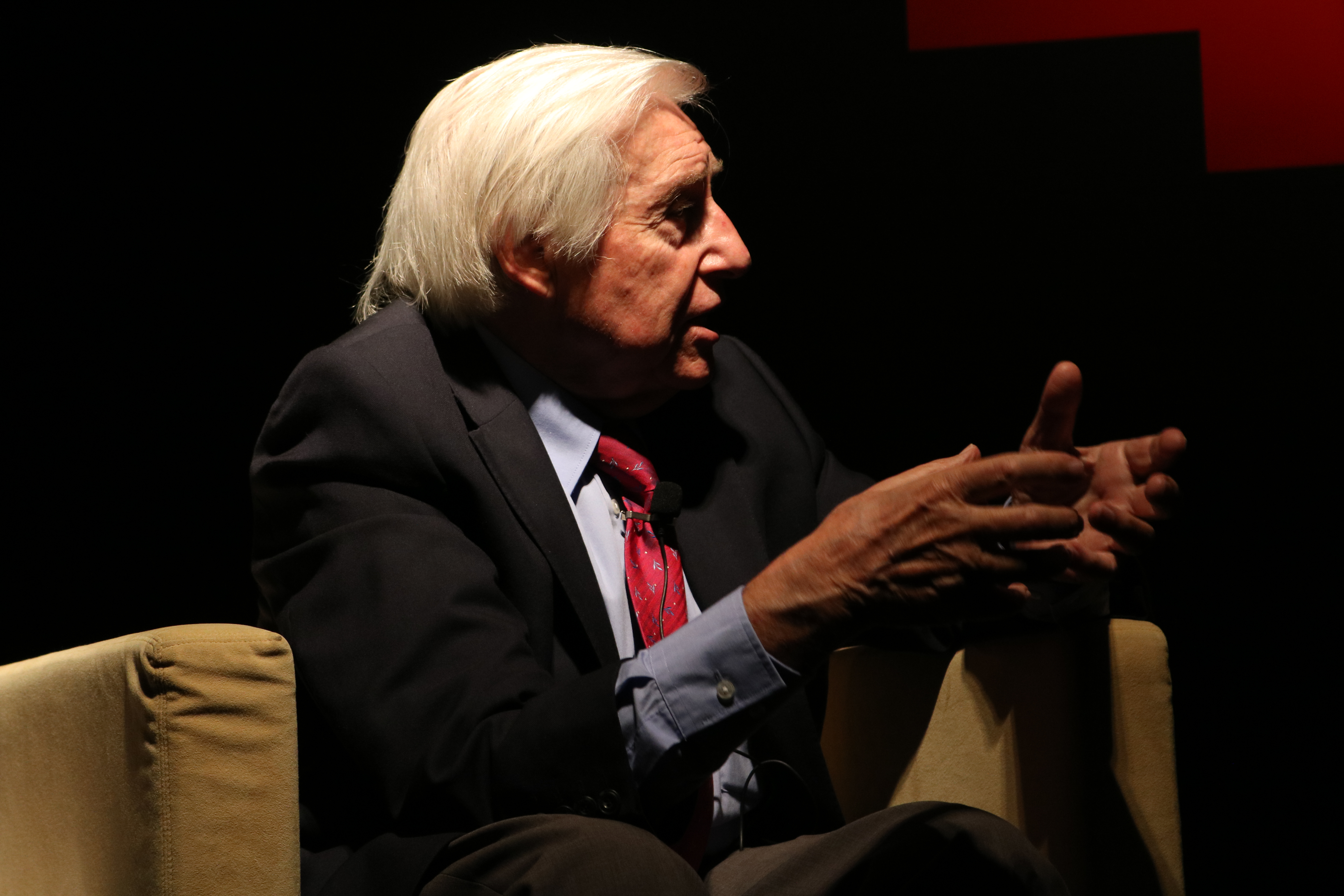
Joaquín Achúcarro 01 - Sep 5, 2019

== Biography and career ==
Achúcarro was born in Bilbao, Spain, and grew up in the Spanish post-war period. He began piano lessons at the Bilbao Conservatory and in 1946, at the age of 13, made his concerto debut in Bilbao playing a Mozart concerto with a local orchestra. As a teenager, he moved to Madrid to study for a degree in physics, although soon after his graduation he devoted himself totally to the study of music and moved to Siena, Italy to study at the Accademia Musicale Chigiana. He also had lessons with José Cubiles.

In 1959 he won the 4th prize of the Ferruccio Busoni International Piano Competition. The same year his career was launched after his victory at the Liverpool International Competition, which led to his debut with the London Symphony Orchestra.

He has since worked in 58 countries, with 206 orchestras including some of the finest ensembles, such as the Berlin Philharmonic, New York Philharmonic Orchestra, London Symphony, Philharmonia, BBC Philharmonic Orchestra, Baltimore Symphony Orchestra, London Philharmonic, Deutsches Symphonie-Orchester Berlin, Chicago Symphony, Orchestre National de France, Tokyo Philharmonic Orchestra, Los Angeles etc. and with conductors such as Claudio Abbado, Riccardo Chailly, Zubin Mehta, Yehudi Menuhin, Seiji Ozawa and Sir Simon Rattle.

Achucarro's style is characterized by a poetic sound with clean technique that is not flamboyant. Achucarro is celebrated for his interpretations of Brahms, Rachmaninoff, and Ravel as well as several Spanish composers.

Since the mid-1980s, he has been a professor in the Meadows School of the Arts of Southern Methodist University in Texas, United States.

Achúcarro has recorded over 30 albums for various labels.

In 1996 he was knighted by King Juan Carlos with the Gold Medal of Fine Arts.
