= Mozart: The Sonata Project - Salzburg =

- Cover of Mozart: The Sonata Project - Salzburg

Studio album by Yundi
- Released: April 05,2024
- Recorded: November 2023
- Venue: Great Hall of the Salzburg Mozarteum
- Genre: Classical
- Length: 81 minutes
- Label: Warner Classics

Mozart: The Sonata Project - Salzburg is a latest album of Yundi, which was released on 5 April 2024.

== Background ==
In this album, Yundi returns to the roots of his musical inspiration, as he was captivated by Mozart already at the age of 7. Yundi hopes to take listeners on a journey through Mozart's musical landscapes, a realm of music closest to Yundi's heart, aiming for his audience to experience a similar infatuation with the "singing, colourful, human tone of the most ingenious composer".

To promote the album's release, Yundi has embarked on a 2024 European concert tour, YUNDI Plays Mozart The Sonata Project 1, visiting cities historically connected with Mozart, including Vienna, Paris, Munich, Frankfurt, Cologne, and Berlin.

== Critical reception ==
Professional ratings
Review scores
Source	Rating
Le Soir	5/5 stars
The Music Scene	5/5 stars
Le Devoir	4.5/5 stars
Concerti	4/5 stars
AllMusic	3.5/5 stars

Yundi's Mozart: The Sonata Project - Salzburg received acclaim. The album is recommended by Classical FM as one of the Featured Albums of the Week, and listed as the Album of the Week by Scala Radio and Le Soir.

Christoph Vratz of German classical music magazine Concerti described Yundi's three Mozart sonatas (KV 310, 331, 457) and the Fantasy KV 475 "[...]With a very fine, precisely balanced touch with careful pedaling and, above all, thanks to the resolute rejection of anything intentionally extravagant, Yundi is able to convince. We experience a Mozart who is driven by a passion for storytelling that we also know from his stage works and major concerts. A Mozart who sometimes draws contrasts sharply, who sometimes manages a gentle transition within a few moments, who can bubble with energy and deliver a lonely eulogy. In this respect, this recording can undoubtedly be seen as a win.[...]"

Bryce Morrison of Gramophone reviewed “His approach is a convincing challenge to a more conventional restraint, a restless Sturm und Drang precursor of Romanticism.” Norman Lebrecht applauded the album: “In twelve and a half minutes, Yundi gives Mozart a total makeover. This is the most refreshing and innovative Mozart pianism I have heard in years.”

== Track listing ==
The album features several of Mozart's most cherished piano sonatas, including

- Mozart: Piano Sonata No. 8 (K.310)
- Mozart: Piano Sonata No. 11 (K.331) Alla Turca
- Mozart: Fantasia in C minor, K. 475
- Mozart: Piano Sonata No. 14 (K.457)

== Charts ==
Chart performance for Mozart: The Sonata Project - Salzburg
Chart (2024)	Peak position
US Billboard Traditional Classical	7
UK Classical Specialist	11
