= Etsuko Hirose =

Japanese classical pianist (born 1979)

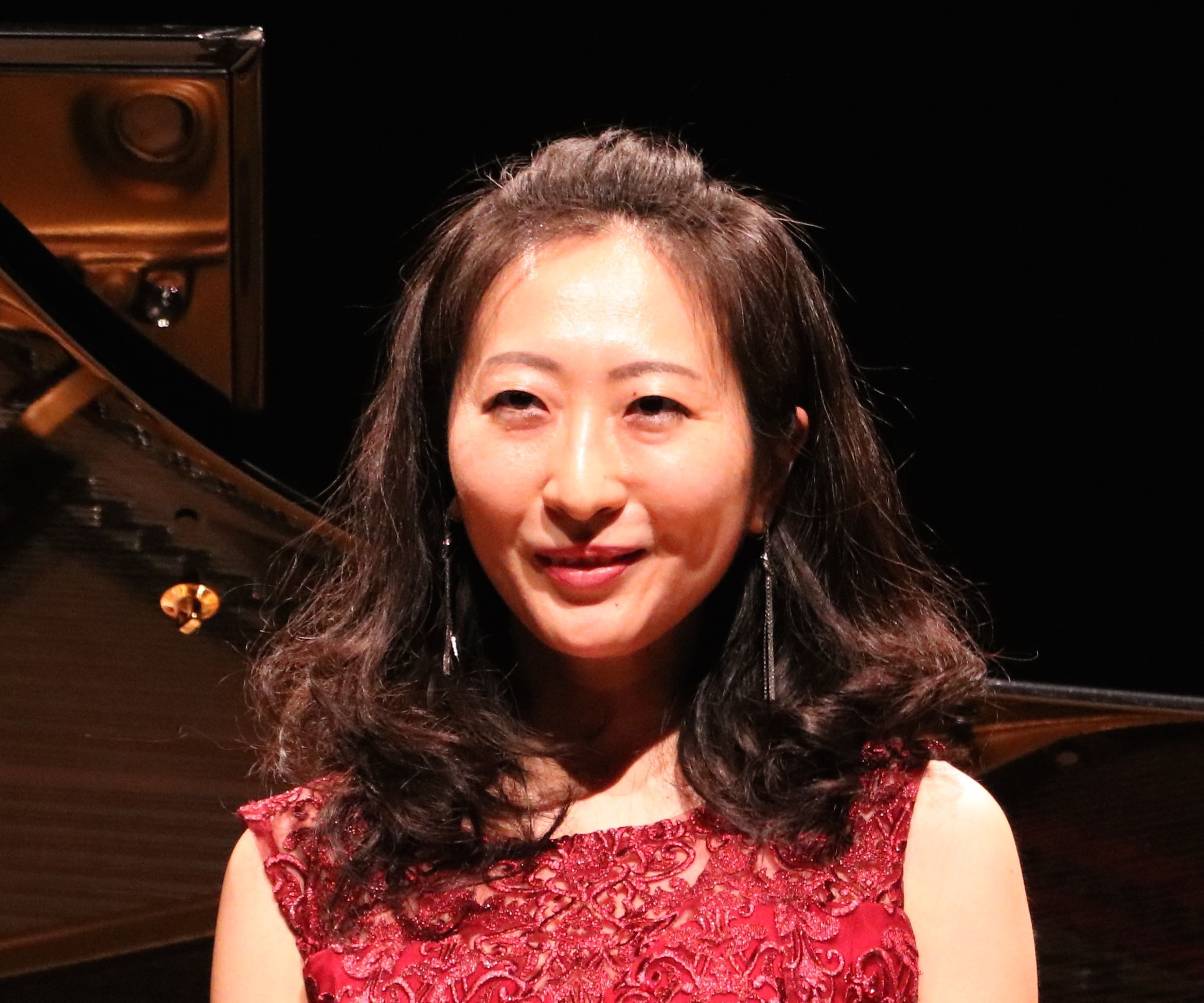
Etsuko Hirose at La Folle Journée of Nantes (2018)

Etsuko Hirose (広瀬 悦子, Hirose Etsuko, born 1979) is a Japanese classical pianist.

== Life ==
Born in Nagoya, Hirose started playing the piano at the age of three. When she was 6 years old, she interpreted Mozart's Piano Concerto No. 26. At the age of 15, after having given many concerts, she moved to France. She entered the École Normale de Musique de Paris in Germaine Mounier's class and graduated unanimously. She then joined the Conservatoire national supérieur de musique et de danse (CNSM) with Bruno Rigutto and Nicholas Angelich as professors In 1997, she won first prize in the Martha Argerich competition, which marked the beginning of her solo career. In 1999, she was unanimously awarded the first prize for piano by the CNSM and the Daniel Magne prize. In 2000, she was given an honorable mention at the XIV International Chopin Piano Competition.

She then returned to Japan, gave many concerts and recorded several CDs. Since 2008, she has been living in France again and regularly returns to Japan to give recitals.

She later perfected her skills with Marie-Françoise Bucquet and Jorge Chaminé, and more recently, with Alfred Brendel.

She regularly plays at the La Folle Journée in Nantes at the beginning of each year, an event she considers a "must-attend" one.

== Selected discography ==
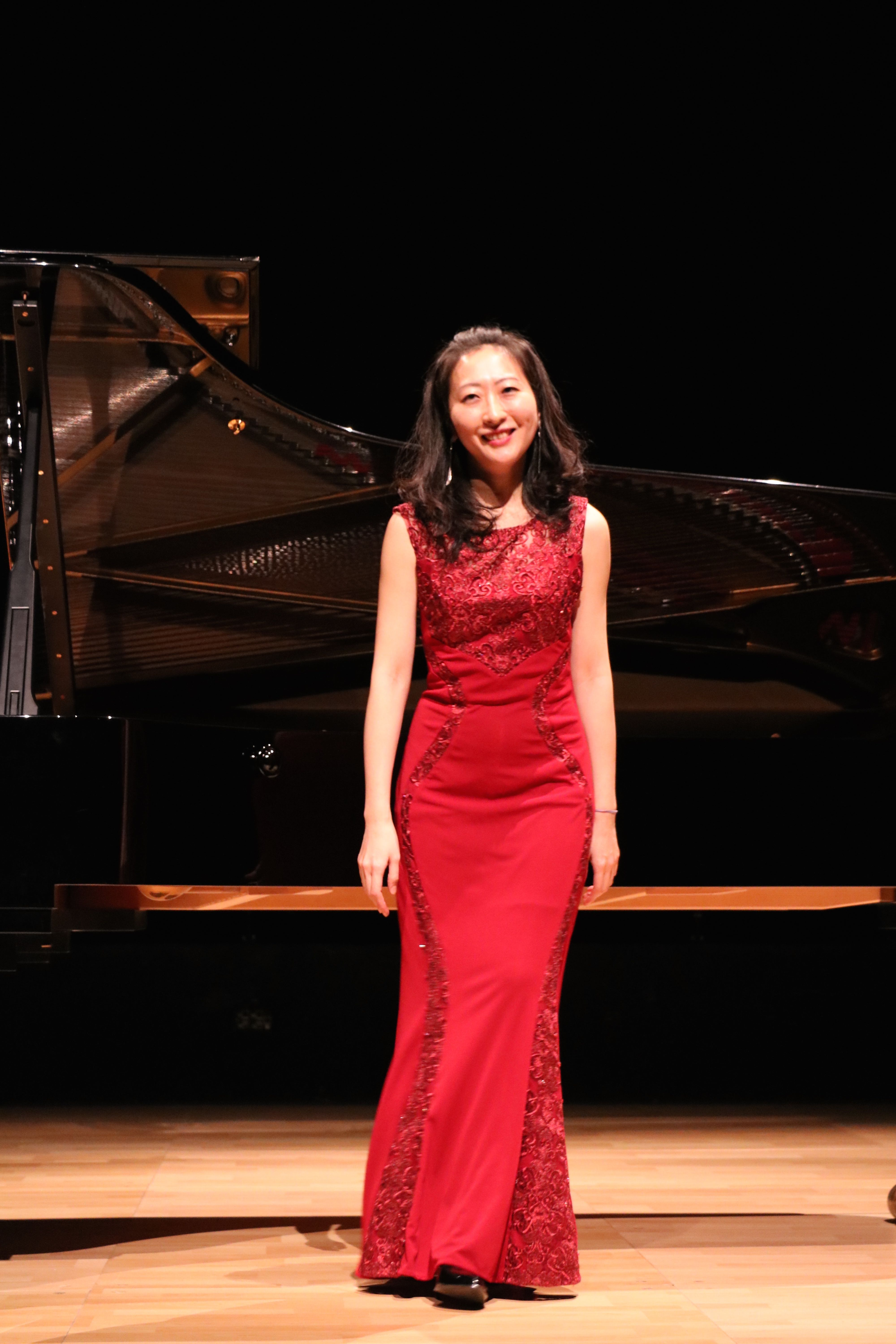
Hirose after a performance at La Folle Journée 2018 in Nantes

- Chaconne, 2004, Nippon Columbia
- La Valse, 2005
- Fantaisies, Denon
- Le vent, Denon
- Chopin : Ballades et Nocturnes, 2010, Mirare
- Concertos de Litz et schumann, 2011, Mirare
- Balakirev, 2012, Mirare
- Sonatas for piano, 2012, Mirare
- Des Knaben Wunderhorn, 2013, ELOQUENCE
- Russian Ballet Transcriptions, 2017, Piano21

== Awards ==
- 1997: Premier prix au Concours Martha Argerich.
- 1999: Prix Daniel Magne
- 1999: Premier prix de piano à l'unanimité au Conservatoire de Paris
