= Véronique Roux =

French pianist

- Born: 1955 (age 69–70)
- Genres: Classical
- Occupation: Piano

Véronique Roux (born in 1955) is a French classical pianist.

== Biography ==
She entered the Conservatoire de Paris at the age of 15 after a first piano prize obtained in Marseille with Pierre Barbizet, she was taught by Jeanne-Marie Darré, Geneviève Joy and Gabriel Tacchino. The winner of numerous prizes, she performs as soloist in recitals in France and Europe: Germany, England, Austria, Belgium, Ireland, Italy, Switzerland.

Among the French orchestras with which she performed are the Orchestre national de Lille, the Orchestre régional de Cannes-Provence-Alpes-Côte d'Azur, the Orchestra of the Grand Théâtre de Bordeaux, the Opéra de Marseille, the Haydn orchestra of Bolzano and Trente; abroad, the Orchestra of the Opera de Monte-Carlo and the chamber orchestra of the opera of Monte-Carlo, the Bayerischer Rundfunk of Munich and the RAI at Milan. She has played under the direction of chefs such as Jean-Claude Casadesus.

She perfects herself by studying with Paul Badura-Skoda, Dmitri Bashkirov, Yevgeny Malinin and György Sebők. She gives concerts in the festivals of Lille, Saint-Céré, Antibes, at the Cziffra Foundation, the Menuhin Foundation. Alongside her solo career, chamber music plays a major role in her musical career. She plays in duet with Philippe Bary, her husband, cellist at the Paris Opera, and formed the Trio Florent Schmitt, with her husband playing the cello and cellist Patricia Reibaud.

== Awards ==
- 2nd prize unanimously at the Casella Competition in Naples (1976)
- 2nd prize for piano at the Ferruccio Busoni International Piano Competition at Bolzano (1977)
- First Prize for piano and first prize for chamber music of the Conservatoire de Paris
- Silver medal of the city of Paris at the Long-Thibaud-Crespin Competition (1979)

== Selected recordings ==
- André Jolivet, First and second sonata for piano, éd. Cybelia, CY 667
- Charles Koechlin, Sonata for piano and violin; Sonata for piano and cello, Cybelia publisher, CY 663
- Albert Roussel, Trio for piano, violin and cello, Cybelia, CY 700
- Florent Schmitt, Trio sonatina for piano, violin and cello; elegiac singing for cello and piano, Cybelia, CY 700 as well as records devoted to works by Francis Poulenc and Maurice Ravel.
