= Jae-Yeon Won =

South Korean classical pianist

Jae-Yeon Won 원재연
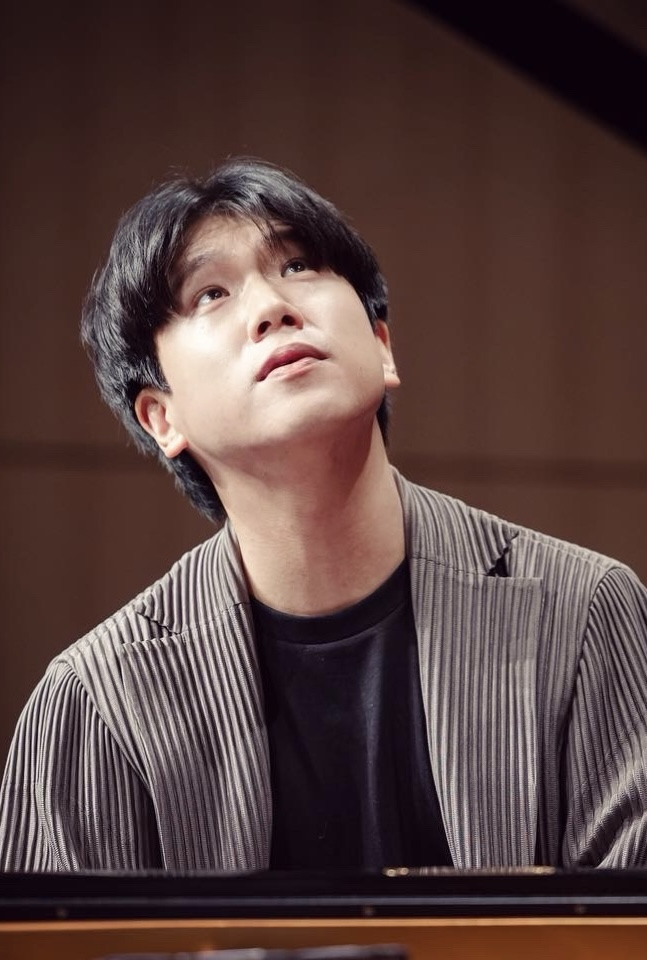

Background information
- Born: 22 February 1988 (age 38); Seoul, South Korea
- Occupation: Classical pianist
- Instruments: Piano

Jae-Yeon Won (born 22 February 1988) is a South Korean pianist.

== Career ==
He won the second prize and the audience prize at the 61st Ferruccio Busoni International Piano Competition in 2017 and won the first prize at the Karl-Robert-Kreiten Prize, the first prize at the Ferrol International Piano Competition, the first prize at the Dong-A Music Competition. He was a laureate at the Long-Thibaud-Crespin Competition.

He embarked on a series of concerts internationally, including at the major concert halls, such as, Berlin Philharmonie, Herkulessaal-Munich, Beethoven Haus-Bonn, Alte Aula-Heidelberg, Berlin Philharmonie-Berlin, Wiener Saal in Salzburg, Salle Cortot, Salle Gaveau, Opera Comique-Paris, Palacio de Opera-Coruna, Auditorio de Ferrol, Håkonshallen -Begen, Teatro Ricardo Castro in Durango, Seoul Art Center and Lotte concert hall-Seoul, etc.

Performances with Orchestras include Orchestre Philharmonique de Radio France, Seoul Philharmonic Orchestra, KBS symphony orchestra, Korean symphony orchestra, Westsächsischen symphonie orchester, Bari Symphony Orchestra, Leipzig Musikhochschule Orchester, Orquestra Sinfonica de Galicia, Quartetto di Cremona and Das Haydn-Orchestra.

In 2023, he made his debut in the Polish/Korean documentary film Chopin: I Am Not Afraid of Darkness, which has been released in several countries including Germany, Austria, Switzerland, Poland, Czech Republic, Malta, Korea, Japan, and the United States.

Since November 2024, he has served as the Artistic Director of the ARKO Ensemble in Europe, founded and sponsored by the Arts Council Korea. He has led the ensemble in performances across major cities, including Salzburg, Vienna, Stockholm, Bergen, Ankara, Prague, Berlin, and London.

In 2025, he released an album featuring works by Alessandro and Domenico Scarlatti on the Onyx Classics label.

== Recordings ==
- 2025 – Alessandro and Domenico Scarlatti: Keyboard Works: A selection of keyboard sonatas by Alessandro and Domenico Scarlatti – Onyx Classics
- 2020 – Bach to Bartok: F. Liszt Apparition No. 1, J. S. Bach aria variata in a minor BWV 989, B. Bartok "Out of doors" sz. 81, etc. – Acousence Classics
