= Jerome Rose =

American pianist and educator (born 1938)

Jerome Rose is an American pianist and educator. He has served on the faculty of the Mannes School of Music and has given masterclasses.

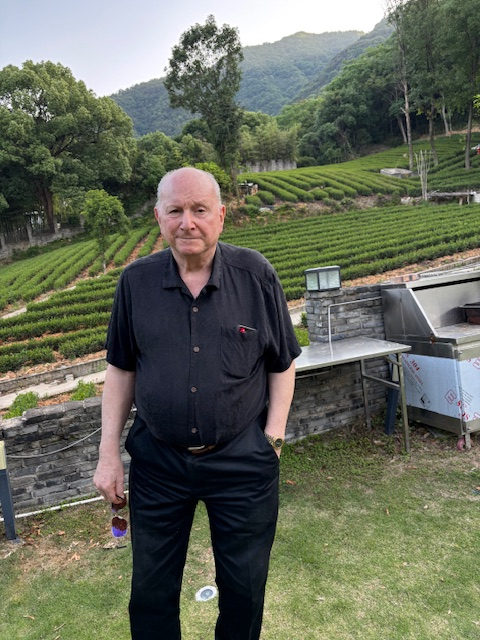
American virtuoso pianist and pedagogue Jerome Rose in 2025.

== Career ==
Rose made his concert debut at the age of 15 with the San Francisco Symphony Orchestra. He was a Fulbright Scholar in Vienna and received the gold medal at the 1961 Ferruccio Busoni International Piano Competition. Rose graduated from Mannes College and the Juilliard School of Music, and later pursued further studies with Leonard Shure and Rudolf Serkin at the Marlboro Music School.

Rose has appeared with orchestras including the Berlin Philharmonic, Vienna Symphony, and London Philharmonic, performing under conductors such as Sir Georg Solti and Wolfgang Sawallisch. His recordings of works by composers such as Liszt, Schumann, Beethoven, Chopin, and Brahms have received distinctions including the Grand Prix du Disque from the Liszt Society of Budapest and the Franz Liszt Medal from Hungary's Ministry of Culture.

In 1999, Rose established the International Keyboard Institute & Festival (IKIF) in New York City, a summer music program. He has served as the director of the program since its founding.
