= Jiyeong Mun =

- Born: 19 December 1995 (age 30); Yeosu, Jeollanam-do, South Korea
- Occupation: Classical pianist
- Website: https://www.jiyeongmun.com/

Korean name
- Hangul: 문지영
- RR: Mun Jiyeong
- MR: Mun Chiyŏng
- IPA: /mun.t͡ɕijʌŋ/

Jiyeong Mun (also known as Chloe Ji-yeong Mun; born 19 December 1995) is a South Korean classical pianist. She drew international attention when she won the Geneva International Competition in Switzerland in 2014 and then the Busoni International Competition in 2015 consecutively.

== Early life ==
Jiyeong Mun was born in Yeosu, South Korea on 19 December 1995. She began learning piano at the age of six and attending a local piano school in her hometown Yeosu, South Korea until 12. She started to distinguish herself in several domestic competitions and won the 8th International Competition for Young Pianists Arthur Rubinstein in Memoriam in 2009. Her success with less fortunate background drew media attention, especially when she won the Ettlingen International Competition for Young Pianists in Germany in 2012.

== Education ==
Since 2010, she has been taught by the pianist and professor Kim Dae-jin, and is currently pursuing a graduate course at Korea National University of Arts.

== Career ==
Mun drew international attention when she won the Geneva International Competition in Switzerland in 2014 and then the Busoni International Competition in Italy in 2015. She was the first Asian first prize winner of the Busoni International competition. Since then she performed with internationally renowned orchestras and conductors such as Alexander Shelley, Valentina Peleggi, Dietrich Paredes, and Massimo Belle and Myung-whun Chung. In 2017, she toured in Italy with the Haydn Orchestra led by the conductor Benjamin Bayl. She has actively performed in chamber music and recitals around the world.

She released her debut album for Deutsche Grammophon in 2017.

== Awards ==
2009: International Competition for Young Pianists 'The Arthur Rubinstein in Memoriam' in Poland

2012: Ettlingen International Competition for Young Pianists in Germany

2014: Takamatsu International Piano Competition in Japan

2014: Geneva International Competition in Switzerland

2015: Busoni International Competition in Italy

== Discography ==
2017: Robert Schumann: Piano Sonata No. 1; Fantasie (Deutsche Grammophon)
