= Ning An =

Chinese-born American pianist

Ning An, also known as An Ning (Chinese: 安宁; born 1976), is a Chinese-born American pianist. Currently he serves as associate professor of Piano at the Yong Siew Toh Conservatory of Music, a part of the National University of Singapore.

== Biography ==
Born in December, 1976, Ning An began his musical studies at the Cleveland Institute of Music with Olga Radosavljevich and Sergei Babayan. He subsequently continued his studies under the tutelage of Russell Sherman at the New England Conservatory.

His international career started after winning top prizes in numerous competitions, including first prize at the Tivoli International Piano Competition (2006), first prize of the William Kapell International Piano Competition (2003), third prize at the Paloma O'Shea Santander International Piano Competition (2002), the Alfred Cortot prize of the XIV International Chopin Piano Competition (2000), first prize of the American National Chopin Piano Competition (2000), Classical Fellow of the American Piano Awards (2000), third prize of the Queen Elisabeth Music Competition (1999), and third prize at the Cleveland International Piano Competition (1997), .

An has been soloist with the Cleveland Orchestra, London Symphony Orchestra, Tchaikovsky Symphony Orchestra of Moscow Radio, Baltimore Symphony Orchestra, Stuttgart Philharmonic Orchestra, Warsaw Philharmonic Orchestra and performed at Carnegie Hall, Salle Verdi (Milano), Salle Cortot (Paris) and the Great Hall of the People (Beijing) among others.
