= Agustin Anievas =

American musician (born 1934)

Agustin Anievas (born June 11, 1934, New York City) is an American pianist, specializing in the works of Frédéric Chopin, Franz Liszt and Sergei Rachmaninoff.

Anievas made his world professional debut in 1944, the first child to give a piano recital at the Palace of Fine Arts in Mexico City, and at 18 made his New York debut with the Little Orchestra Society. In 1953 he appeared on the CBS television network's Arthur Godfrey's Talent Scouts, playing Chopin's "Heroic" Polonaise in A-flat, Op. 53. As a student of Eduard Steuermann and Adele Marcus at the Juilliard School, he earned his B.S. and M.S. in 1959. He was the winner of many competitions, including the Michaels Memorial Award, and the Concert Artists Guild in New York, which offered him a New York debut recital in 1958. Time magazine commented that "he had the prodigious technique and the kind of rhapsodic, deeply felt musical vision that suggests a major career". As the grand prize winner in the first Dimitris Mitropoulos International Competition for Pianists in 1961, he began his international career, playing in the cultural centers of Europe, South America, Southern Africa and Asia, in recital and with orchestras including London Philharmonic, New Philharmonia, BBC, the German radio orchestras, New York Philharmonic, Hong Kong Philharmonic, Mexico Symphony, Chicago, Los Angeles, and Brussels Philharmonic. EMI maintains a catalog of Anievas's performances and releases on their Forte Label. He later became artist in residence and professor of music at Brooklyn College's Conservatory of Music. He retired in 1999, but came back to the stage and recording.
