= Mazurkas, Op. 17 (Chopin) =

Piano pieces composed by Frédéric Chopin

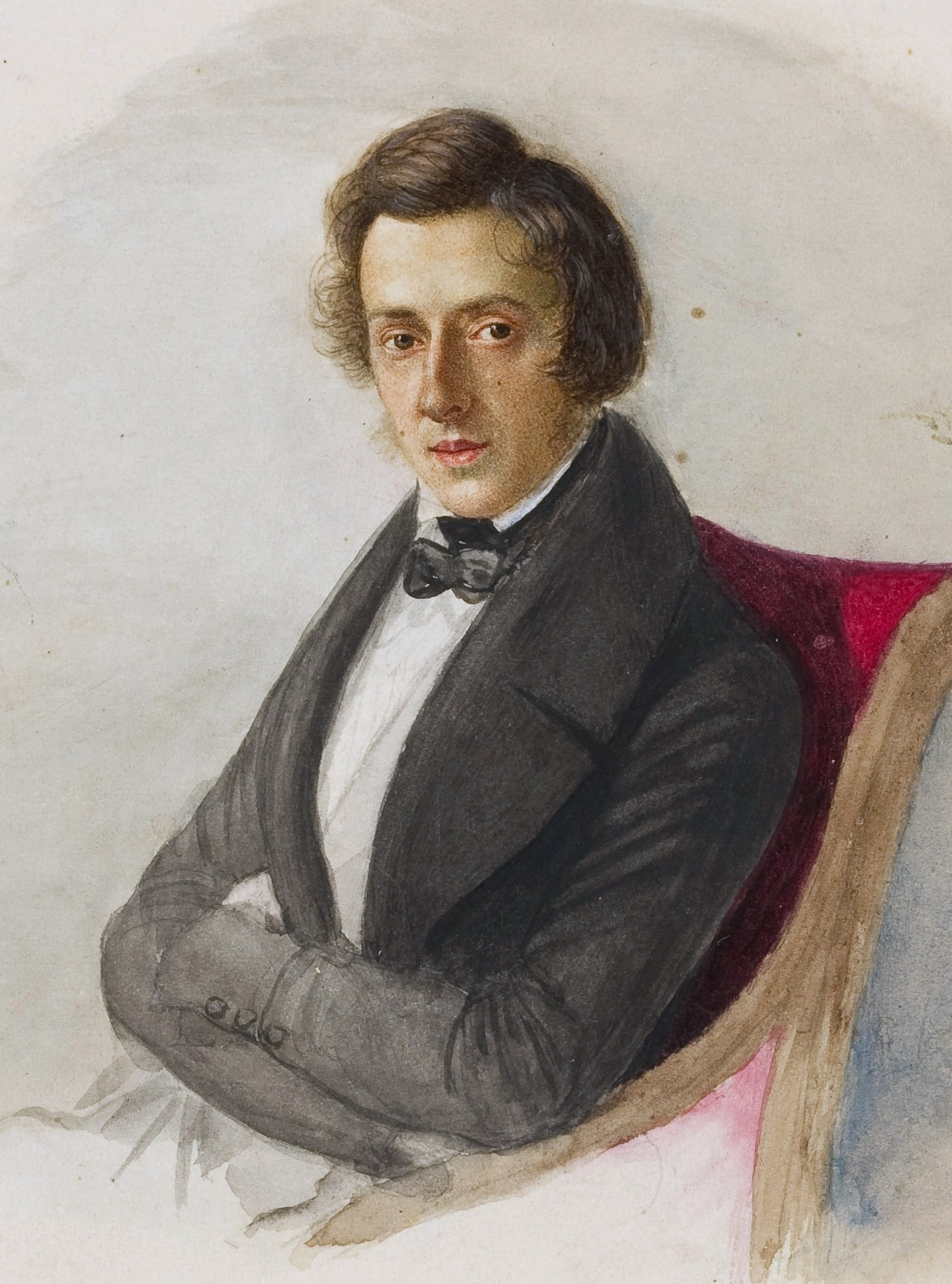
Frédéric Chopin, 1835

Mazurkas, Op. 17 is a set of four mazurkas for solo piano by Frédéric Chopin, composed in 1832–1833 and published in 1834. The set was dedicated to Lina Freppa.

== Composition ==
Frédéric Chopin composed his Op. 17 mazurkas in 1832–33 and they were his first set to be written in Paris. Chopin had just recently settled in France, as he had become a refugee from Poland, however, he hoped he could move back to his homeland when the political situation changed. This hope was never realized and he was never able to return.

Despite relocation, Chopin reflected in the set his homesickness for Poland.

== Analysis ==
=== No. 1 in B♭ major ===
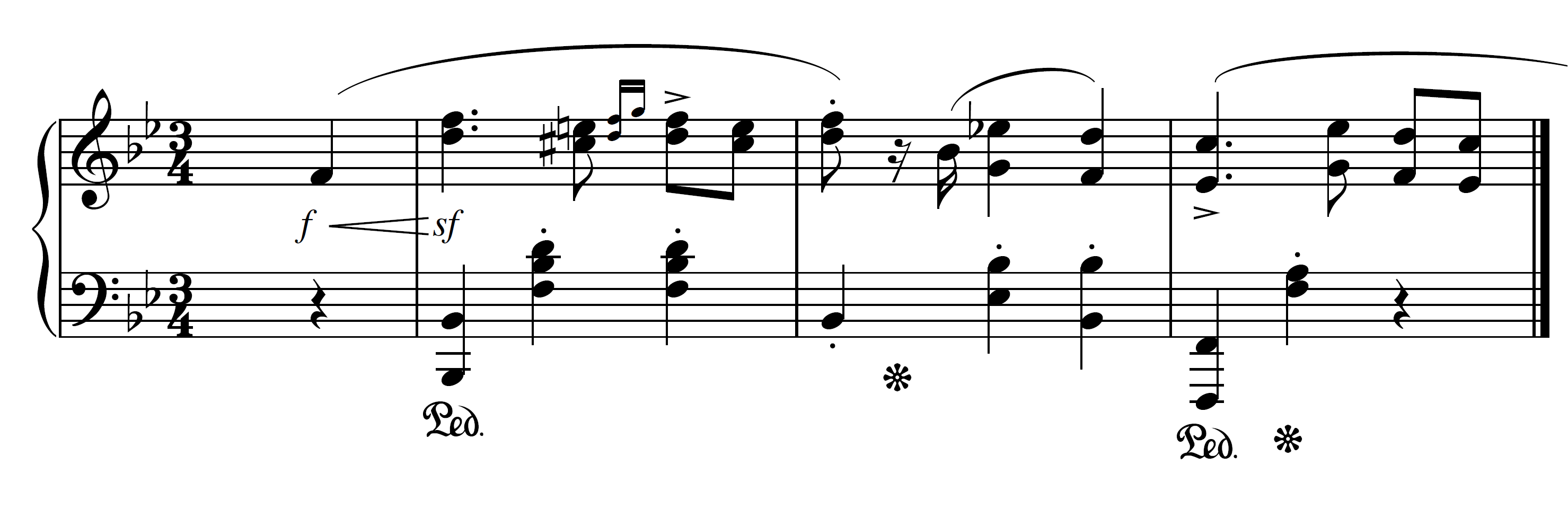
The first few bars of Mazurka in B♭ major, Op. 17, No. 1

Mazurka Op. 17 No.1, performed by Christoph Zbinden (musopen).

The first Mazurka in the set is in B♭ major and has a time signature of 3/4. It also has the tempo marking: Vivo e risoluto (Tempo: = 160). A typical performance of this mazurka lasts two-and-a-half minutes.

The piece starts with a bold theme, characterized by thirds and sixths. It is soon followed by a section in question and answer, which is then completed with a descending sequence. This main theme is repeated twice more with slight modulations. The brief and slower middle section, in E♭ major, has a syncopated rhythm and is subdued in its grace and mystery, providing a calmer atmosphere. Soon, the main theme returns and after being repeated twice again, the mazurka ends boldly with a B♭ major chord in octaves. Overall, the mazurka is full of vigor and joy with an aristocratic air about it.

=== No. 2 in E minor ===
Mazurka Op. 17 No. 2, performed by Christoph Zbinden (musopen) .

The second mazurka is in E minor, is in 3/4, and has a tempo marking of Lento, ma non troppo. A typical performance of this mazurka lasts about two-and-a-half minutes.

This mazurka is waltz-like in character and features a quite homophonic texture with a single tune accompanied by chords. The main theme is charming, yet reflective and has a hesitant and gloomy tone. The brief middle section contains slight harmonic ambiguities and creates a more intimate atmosphere. Soon, the main theme is reprised and the piece ends with intricate arpeggio patterns extending to the piano's upper register, eventually fading quietly. Overall, it is an intimate and melancholic piece suggestive of Chopin's homesick feelings.

=== No. 3 in A♭ major ===
Mazurka Op. 17 No. 3, performed by Christoph Zbinden (musopen).

The third mazurka, in A♭ major, is marked Legato assai. This piece is one of the longest mazurkas Chopin wrote, lasting about six minutes if the repeats are taken.

The third mazurka of this set has homophonic texture, comparable to the previous one. The piece unfolds with varied dynamics. The trio modulates to the key of E major before returning to the main theme. Throughout the first theme, Chopin incorporates modal mixture, portraying a peculiar sound.

=== No. 4 in A minor ===
Mazurka in A minor, Op. 17, No. 4
Performed by Giorgi Latso

Mazurka in A minor, Op. 17, No. 4
Performed by Donald Betts

The last mazurka in the set, in A minor, is in 3/4 and is marked Lento, ma non troppo. This piece lasts between four and five minutes in a typical performance. It is one of Chopin’s most popular mazurkas.

The final mazurka of the set is more characteristic and free than the others. Although it remains in a homophonic texture, the dynamic variation is much greater. The piece ends with the same four measures as it began, with chords played by the left hand portamento without the pedal, and the tempo fading away in a perdendosi. These four measures would later be sampled by Henryk Górecki in the opening of the third movement of his third symphony.

This mazurka was used by modern composer John Williams in the 1987 Steven Spielberg motion picture, “Empire Of The Sun” as a recurring leitmotif within the piece, “Toy Planes, Home and Hearth”. It was also used in the 1972 Ingmar Bergman drama film, “Cries and Whispers”.
