= Montenegrin Symphony Orchestra =

Montenegrin Symphony Orchestra (Montenegrin and Serbian: Crnogorski simfonijski orkestar/Црногорски симфонијски оркестар) began working in September 2007. It is one of the most important and most complex segments of the Montenegrin Music Center. Since its artistical and organisational foundation started on a completely new base, its appearance succeeded almost fifty years of lasting work from the Symphony and Chamber ensemble, which was the part of Radio and Television of Montenegro.

Musical Director and Chief Conductor of the Montenegrin Symphony Orchestra is Russian conductor Grigory Krasko.
