= Fabio Bidini =

Italian pianist

Fabio Bidini (born 11 June, 1968) is an Italian pianist. He was a top prize winner at the Ferruccio Busoni International Piano Competition in 1992 and the Van Cliburn International Piano Competition in 1993. He is currently on the faculty at the Colburn School in Los Angeles where he holds the Carol Colburn Grigor Piano Chair.

Since his debut with the London Symphony Orchestra under Michael Tilson Thomas, he has appeared with many leading orchestras including the San Francisco Symphony, Philharmonia Orchestra, Budapest Festival Orchestra, BBC National Orchestra of Wales at the United Nations, Atlanta Symphony Orchestra, Dallas Symphony Orchestra, St. Louis Symphony Orchestra, Warsaw Philharmonic and the Hungarian National Philharmonic. He has also performed at concert halls such as Carnegie Hall, Kennedy Center, Royal Festival Hall, Tonhalle Zürich, Gewandhaus in Leipzig, Auditorio Nacional de Música Madrid, Muziekgebouw Amsterdam and the Rudolfinum in Prague.

In 2015, Bidini joined the faculty of the Colburn School in Los Angeles where he assumed a newly created chair endowed by philanthropist Carol Colburn Grigor. Previously, he taught at the Hochschule für Musik Hanns Eisler Berlin and the Universität der Künste Berlin. Since 2016, he also teaches at the Hochschule für Musik und Tanz Köln where he serves as Artist-in-Residence.
