= Bozhidar Noev =

Bulgarian pianist

- Born: 08.07.1942; Sofia, Bulgaria
- Died: 08.07.2022; Innsbruck, Austria
- Occupation: Pianist

Bozhidar Noev (Bulgarian: Божидар Ноев) is a Bulgarian pianist. Born in Sofia, his father was a doctor and his mother was an Austrian housewife. He has two older sisters.

He's the head of the keyboards department of Innsbruck's Conservatory, where he teaches since 1977.

Recorxd of piano prizes, incomplete
Year	Competition	Prize	Ex-aequo with...	1st prize winner
1965	(Italy) XVII Ferruccio Busoni, Bolzano	1st prize		1st place void
1968	(Italy) III Alessandro Casagrande, Terni	2nd prize		1st prize void
1969	(Italy) IV Alessandro Casagrande, Terni	1st prize		
