= Scherzo No. 1 (Chopin) =

Composition for piano by Chopin

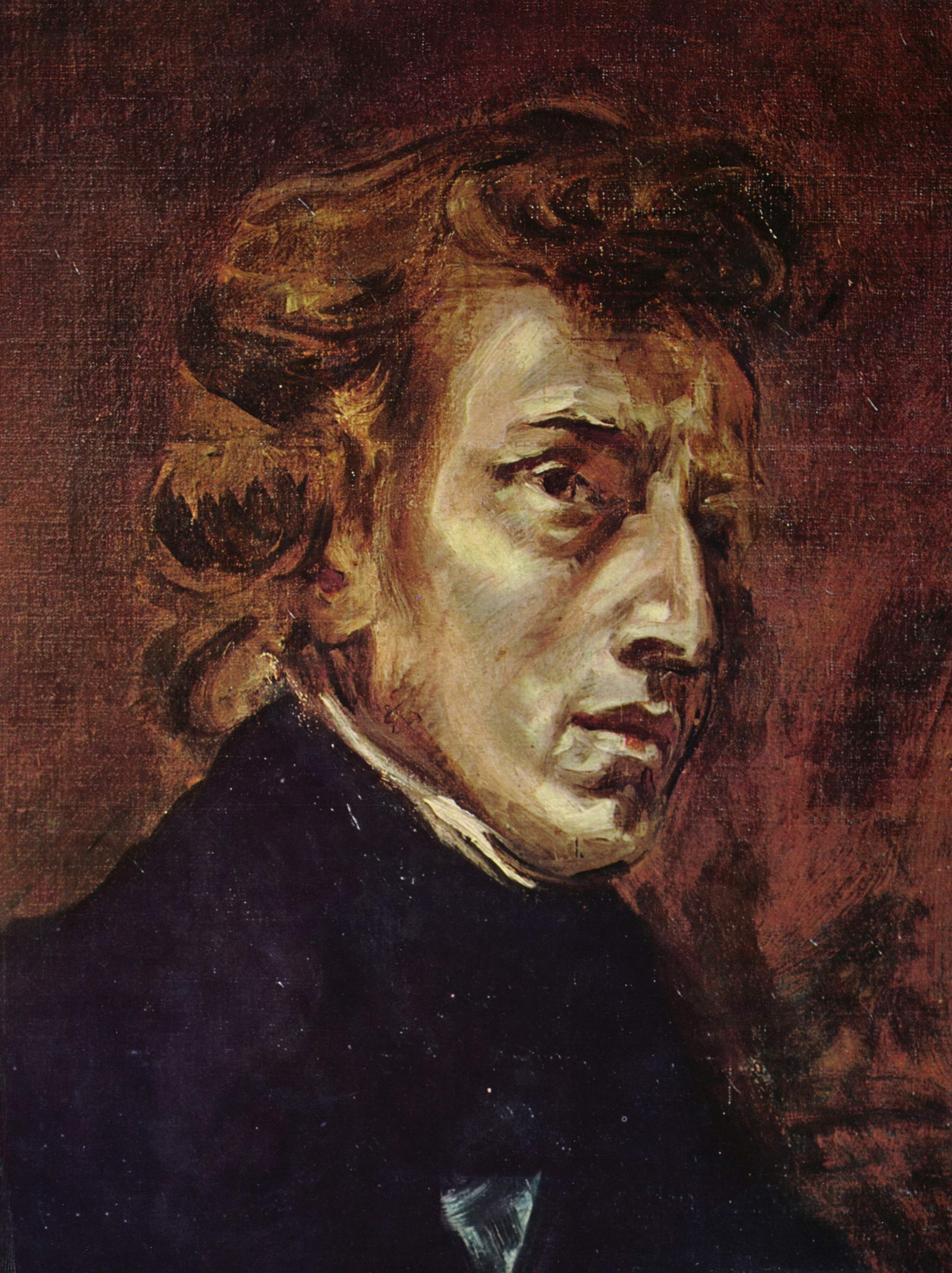
Frédéric Chopin, 28, at piano, from Delacroix's joint portrait of Chopin and Sand, 1838

Scherzo No. 1 in B minor, Op. 20, performed by Alice Gi-Young Hwang

The Scherzo No. 1 in B minor, Op. 20, is a composition for solo piano written by Frédéric Chopin and dedicated to Thomas Albrecht. As to the genesis of this Scherzo, little is known beyond the 1835 publication date, though it is presumed to have been completed around 1833. The piece begins with the tempo marking Presto con fuoco. The piece is dark, dramatic, and lively. It is complex and considered to be one of Chopin's more difficult works.

== Structure ==
This first Scherzo takes A-B-A-Coda form and begins with two chords in fortissimo. At tremendous speed, a series of dramatic outbursts in the B minor tonic follows. Near the center of the piece, the music leads into a slower section in B major; finally one hears a tangible melody in the middle register, surrounded by accompaniment in both the left and upper right hands. Chopin quotes here from an old Polish Christmas song (Lulajże, Jezuniu / Sleep, little Jesus); the tempo in this section is marked Molto più lento. The B major area dissolves as the harmony mysteriously changes character via secondary dominants. The two chords from the beginning reappear, superimposed over vestiges of the middle section. Then the beginning presto repeats itself in the familiar minor tonic.

The lead-in to the dramatic, virtuosic coda is similar to the approach toward the Molto più lento, but slightly different (as it is with Chopin's Second and Third Scherzi). This final section incorporates dizzying arpeggiated flights up and down almost the entire keyboard, suspended by a climactic series of nine ten-note chords (E♯ diminished seventh (with diminished third) over a dominant (F#) bass pedal). After the resolution and a rapid chromatic ascent over four octaves in both hands, the piece comes to a resolute conclusion via a bold triple-forte (fff) altered plagal cadence (C#m7b5/B - Bm) that strongly resembles an "Amen" ending to a hymn.

In his rendition of the Scherzo No. 1, Vladimir Horowitz famously duplicated the chromatic scale near the ending into interlocking octaves, a technique he often used as his signature on other pieces. The interlocking octaves were meant to be played at the same speed as the original chromatic scale. Franz Liszt was reputedly the first to play it this way. Theodor Kullak in his 1882 edition added the comment: "most virtuosos execute this scale in octaves".

== History ==
This piece was written in 1831, during the November Uprising against the Russian Empire. A friend of Chopin's, Thomas Albrecht, to whom it was dedicated, convinced him to stay in Vienna, away from his family in Poland, to build his musical career. During this time he only played one concert, where he performed his concerto in E minor. Because of the struggle and the war, his compositions changed from pieces of a brilliant style to works in a new, darker tonality. Chopin composed this piece and several of the Opus 10 etudes around the same time.

Scherzo is "joke" in Italian, and Robert Schumann commented on the work's apparent disregard for its title: "How is 'gravity' to clothe itself if 'jest' goes about in dark veils?" It is dark, suspenseful, and full of chaos – the first clear melody is in the slow B major middle section, but returns to a chaotic murmur soon after. It is hypothesized that this portrayed Chopin's feelings toward the war, or told a story about rebellion in his homeland. This may reflect Brahms' sentiment with his own ironic scherzos.
