= Yundi discography =

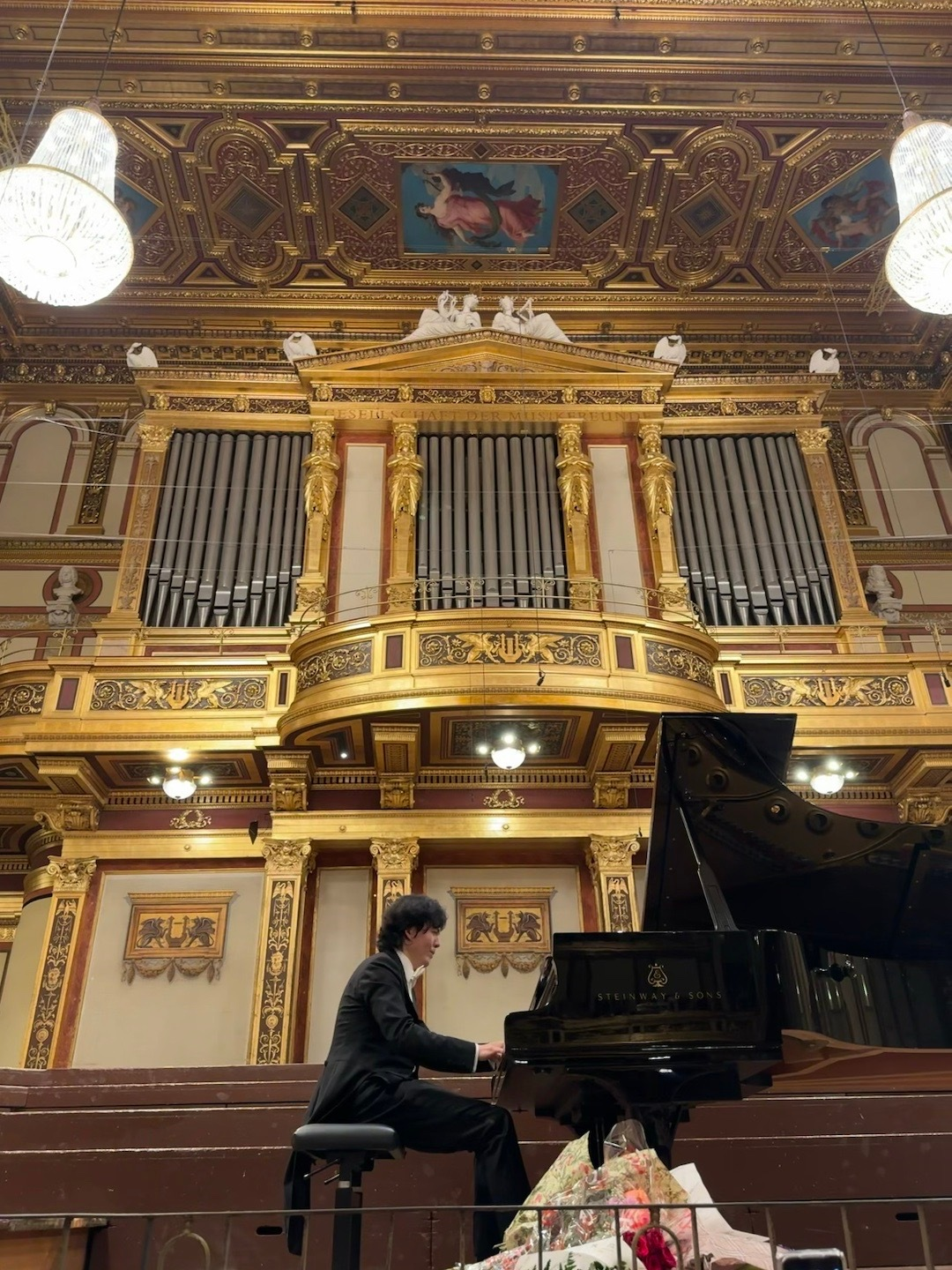
- Yundi performing at the Golden Hall, Musikverein, April 2024
- Studio albums: 16
- Video albums: 3
- Contributions: 5

Yundi is a classical concert pianist born in Chongqing, China on October 7, 1982. He is also popularly known as Yundi Li. His discography contains 16 studio albums. He has also made five contributions to compilation albums not under his name and featured in three video items, a 2004 and 2010 concert, as well as a documentary.

Yundi signed an exclusive contract with Deutsche Grammophon in 2001 and in early 2002 he released his first album, containing the works of Chopin. In 2003, the year of Yundi's Carnegie Hall debut, Deutsche Grammophon released his second album, an all-Liszt CD which was given the title "Best CD of the Year" by The New York Times, which also referred to his 2008 release of Prokofiev's Piano Concerto No. 2 and Ravel's Piano Concerto in G major as one of the best classical CDs of the year. Li continued to record for Deutsche Grammophon until October 2008, releasing a total of 6 albums with the label.

In 2010, Yundi began to record with EMI, with whom he signed an exclusive recording contract to record Chopin's complete solo piano works. His first EMI release, the complete Nocturnes was released in March 2010.

In May 2012, Yundi officially signed with Universal Music Group and cooperated with Deutsche Grammophon once again. He then released recordings of Beethoven Piano Sonatas, Beethoven Emperor and Schumann Fantasie, THE ART OF YUNDI, Chopin Prelude and Chopin Ballades Berceuse Mazurkas.

In December 2019, Yundi signed with Warner Classics. He soon released a new album on its label, Chopin's Piano Concertos Nos. 1 & 2, in January 2020. In this recording, he not only played the piano, but also conducted the Warsaw Philharmonic Orchestra from the piano bench.

On 5 April 2024, Yundi released his latest album, Mozart: The Sonata Project - Salzburg.

Yundi has achieved considerable commercial and critical success. His albums have ranked on Billboard charts, including the Top Classical Albums.

== Albums ==
Year of issue	Details	Released date	Record label
2000	14th international Frederick Chopin Piano Competition Vol.1 Vol.2: Chopin: Piano Concerto No.1 in E minor, Op.11 / Piano Sonata No.3 in B minor, Op.58 / Mazurkas, Op.33 / Andante spianato et Grande Polonaise brillante Op.22 / Nocturne No.13 in C minor, Op.48 No.1 / Waltze No.5 in A flat Op.42 / Op.25 No.11 in A minor "Winter Wind" / Ballade No.4 in F minor, Op.52	Oct. 2000	Maxell
2001	Yundi Li: Chopin: Chopin: Piano Sonata No.3 in B minor, Op.58 / Andante spianato et Grande Polonaise brillante Op.22 / Etudes, Op.10 No.2 in A minor / Etudes, Op.10 No.5 in G flat major / Op.25 No.11 in A minor "Winter Wind" / Nocturne No.1 in B flat minor, Op.9 No.1 / Nocturne in E flat major, Op.9, No.2 / Nocturne No.5 in F sharp, Op.15 No.2 / Impromptu No.4 in C sharp minor, Op.66 "Fantaisie-Impromptu"	Sep. 2001	Deutsche Grammophon
2002	Yundi Li: Liszt: Liszt: Piano Sonata in B minor, S.178 / No.3 in G sharp minor ("La Campanella") / Liebestraum No.3 in A flat, S.541 No.3 / Tanantella (Venezia e Napoli No.3) (S.161) / Rigoletto paraphrase, S.434	Oct. 2002	Deutsche Grammophon
2004	Yundi Li: Chopin Scherzi & Impromptus: Chopin: Scherzo No.1 in B minor, Op.20 / Scherzo No.2 in B flat minor, Op.31 / Scherzo No.3 in C sharp minor, Op.39 / Scherzo No.4 in E, Op.54 / Impromptu No.1 in A flat, Op.29 / Impromptu No.2 in F sharp, Op.36 / Impromptu No.3 in G flat, Op.51	Jun. 2004	Deutsche Grammophon
2005	Yundi Li: Vienna Recital: Scarlatti: Piano Sonata in E major, K.380 / Piano Sonata in G major, K.13; Mozart: Piano Sonata No.10 in C major, K.330; Schumann: Carnaval, Op.9; Liszt: Rhapsodie espagnole, S.254	Jun. 2005	Deutsche Grammophon
2006	Yundi Li: Chopin Liszt Piano Concertos No.1: Liszt: Piano Concerto No.1 in E flat, S.124; Chopin: Piano Concerto No.1 in E minor, Op.11	Jul. 2006	Deutsche Grammophon
2008	Yundi Li: Sergei Prokofiev Piano Concerto No.2 & Ravel Piano Concerto In G Major: Prokofiev: Piano Concerto No.2 in G minor, Op.16; Ravel: Piano Concerto in G major, M.83	May. 2007	Deutsche Grammophon
2010	YUNDI: Chopin: Nocturnes: Chopin: Nocturne No.1 in B flat minor, Op.9 No.1 / Nocturne in E flat major, Op.9, No.2 / Nocturne in B, Op.9, No.3 / Nocturne in F, Op.15, No.1 / Nocturne No.5 in F sharp, Op.15 No.2 / Nocturne No.6 in G minor, Op.15 No.3 / Nocturne No.7 in C sharp minor Op.27 No.1 / Nocturne No.8 in D flat Op.27 No.2 / Nocturne No.9 in B, Op.32 No.1 / Nocturne No.10 in A flat, Op.32 No.2 / Nocturne No.11 in G minor, Op.37 No.1 / Nocturne No.12 in G, Op.37 No.2 / Nocturne No.13 in C minor, Op.48 No.1 / Nocturne No.14 in F sharp minor, Op.48 No.2 / Nocturne No.15 in F minor, Op.55 No.1 / Nocturne No.16 in E flat, Op.55 No.2 / Nocturne No.17 in B, Op.62 No.1 / Nocturne No.18 in E, Op.62 No.2 / Nocturne No.19 in E minor, Op.72 No.1 (posthumous) / Nocturne in C sharp minor Op.posth. / Nocturne in C minor, Op.posth. (Chopin)	Nov. 2009-Jan.2010	EMI Classics
2010	YUNDI: Live In Beijing: Chopin: Andante spianato et Grande Polonaise brillante Op.22 / Piano Sonata No.2 in B-Flat Minor, Op.35 / Mazurkas, Op.33 / Nocturne No.1 in B flat minor, Op.9 No.1 / Nocturne in E flat major, Op.9, No.2 / Nocturne No.5 in F sharp, Op.15 No.2 / Polonaise in A-flat major, Op.53; Ren Guang: Colourful clouds chasing the moon; Chopin: Étude in C Minor Op.10, No.12	May. 2010	EMI Classics
2011	YUNDI: Red Piano: Xian Xinghai, Yin Chengzong, Chu Wanghua: Yellow River Piano Concerto; Wang Luobin, Zhang Zhao: In That Place Wholly Faraway; Wang Jianzhong: Glowing Red Morningstar Lilies; Zhang Zhao: Pi Huang (Peking Opera); Ma Jingfeng, Zhang Nan, Zhang Zhao: Remote Shangri-La; Wang Jianzhong: Liu Yang River; Zhang Zhao: Kangding Love Song; Ren Guang: Colourful clouds chasing the moon; Wang Jianzhong: Five Yunnan Folk Songs (Dali Girl, Following the Brother, Puzzle Tune, Mountain Song, Dragon Lantern Tune); Zhu Jian'er, Chu Wanghua: Celebrating our new life; Lei Zhenbang, Zhang Zhao: Why are the flowers so red?; Liu Chi, Zhang Zhao: My Motherland	Jul. 2011	EMI Classics
2013	YUNDI: Beethoven: Beethoven: Piano Sonata No.8 in C minor, Op.13-"Pathétique" / Piano Sonata No.14 in C sharp minor, Op.27, No.2 -"Moonlight" / Piano Sonata No.23 in F minor, Op.57 -"Appassionata"	Jun. 2012	Deutsche Grammophon
2013	The art of YUNDI: Liszt: Piano Concerto No.1 in E flat, S.124, 1. Allegro maestoso; Chopin: Nocturne in E flat major, Op.9, No.2 / Impromptu No.4 in C sharp minor, Op.66 "Fantaisie-Impromptu"; Mozart: Piano Sonata No.10 In C Major, K.330 1. Allegro moderato; Liszt: No.3 in G sharp minor ("La Campanella"); Ravel: Piano Concerto in G major, M. 83 2. Adagio assai; Scarlatti: Piano Sonata in G major, K.13; Chopin: Nocturne No.1 in B flat minor, Op.9 No.1 / Etudes, Op.10 No.5 in G flat major; Liszt: Piano Sonata in B minor, S.178 Lento assai - Allegro energico/Liebestraum No.3 In A-Flat, S.541 No.3; Chopin: Piano Sonata No.3 in B minor, Op.58 2. Scherzo (Molto vivace) / Impromptu No.1 in A flat, Op.29; Schumann: Carnaval, Op.9 1. Préambule 2. Pierrot 14. Reconnaissance 18. Promenade; Prokofiev: Piano Concerto No.2 in G minor, Op.16 2. Scherzo (Vivace); Liszt: Rigoletto paraphrase, S.434	2002-2007	Deutsche Grammophon
2014	YUNDI: Emperor Fantasy: Beethoven: Piano Concerto No.5 in E flat major Op.73 -"Emperor"; Schumann: Fantasie in C, Op.17	Feb. 2014	Deutsche Grammophon
2015	YUNDI: Chopin Preludes: Chopin: 24 Preludes, Op.28 / Prelude No.25 in C sharp minor, Op.45 / Prelude No.26 in A flat major, Op.posth.	Jun. 2015	Deutsche Grammophon
2016	YUNDI: Chopin Ballades Berceuse Mazurkas: Chopin: Ballade No.1 in G minor, Op.23 / Ballade No.2 in F major, Op.38 / Ballade No.3 in A flat major, Op.47 / Ballade No.4 in F minor, Op.52 / Berceuse in D flat Op.57 / Mazurkas, Op.17	Dec. 2015	Deutsche Grammophon
2020	Chopin: Piano Concertos Nos. 1 & 2 YUNDI: Chopin: Piano Concerto No.1 in E minor, Op.11; Chopin: Piano Concerto No.2 in F minor, Op.21	Jan. 2020	Warner Classics
2024	Mozart: The Sonata Project - Salzburg: Mozart: Piano Sonata No.8 (K.310); Mozart: Piano Sonata No.11 (K.331) Alla Turca; Mozart: Fantasia in C minor, K.475; Mozart: Piano Sonata No.14 (K.457)	Apr. 2024	Warner Classics

== Video releases (and see above for CD with DVD) ==
Year of issue	Details	Recording date	Record label
2005	Yundi Li: Live in Concert: Chopin: Scherzo No.1 in B minor, Op.20 / Scherzo No.2 in B flat minor, Op.31 / Scherzo No.3 in C sharp minor, Op.39 / Scherzo No.4 in E major, Op.54 / Nocturne in E flat major, Op.9, No.2; Liszt: Piano Sonata in B minor, S.178 / Rigoletto paraphrase, S.434; Yu Shi Wang: Sun Flowers	May 31, 2004	Deutsche Grammophon
2008	The Young Romantic: A Portrait of Yundi: Documentary of Li as he prepares to perform with the legendary Berlin Philharmonic Orchestra.; Bonus Yundi Li plays at La Roque-d'Anthéron: Chopin: Scherzo No.1 in B minor, Op.20 / Scherzo No.2 in B flat minor, Op.31 / Scherzo No.3 in C sharp minor, Op.39 / Scherzo No.4 in E, Op.54; Liszt: No.3 in G sharp minor ("La Campanella")	2004-2008	Euroarts
2010	YUNDI: Live In Beijing: Chopin: Nocturne in B flat minor, Op.9, No.1 / Nocturne in E flat major, Op.9, No.2 /Nocturne No.5 in F sharp, Op.15 No.2 / Nocturne No.8 in D flat Op.27 No.2 / Nocturne No.13 in C minor, Op.48 No.1 / Andante spianato et Grande Polonaise brillante Op.22 / Mazurkas, Op.33 / Piano Sonata No.2 in B flat minor, Op.35 /; Ren Guang: Colourful clouds chasing the moon; Chopin: Étude in C Minor, Op.10, No.12	2010	EMI Classics

== Contributions ==
Year of issue	Album details	Record label
2004	Love Moods - The Most Romantic Classics: Chopin: Nocturne in E flat major, Op.9, No.2	Deutsche Grammophon
2006	Steinway Legends: Legends in the Making: Chopin: Andante spianato and Grande Polonaise for piano & orchestra, Op.22	Deutsche Grammophon
2007	Piano Moods: Liszt: Liebestraum No.3 in A flat, S.541	Deutsche Grammophon
2009	Chopin Complete Edition: Chopin: Impromptu No.1 in A flat, Op.29 / Impromptu No.2 in F sharp, Op.36 / Impromptu No.3 in G flat, Op.51 / Impromptu No.4 in C sharp minor, Op.66 "Fantaisie-Impromptu"	Deutsche Grammophon
2021	The Chopin Masters: Chopin: Piano Sonata No.3 in B minor Op.58 / Andante spianato in G major & Grande Polonaise brillante in E flat major Op.22	Deutsche Grammophon
