= Andrei Gavrilov =

Russian-Swiss pianist (born 1955)

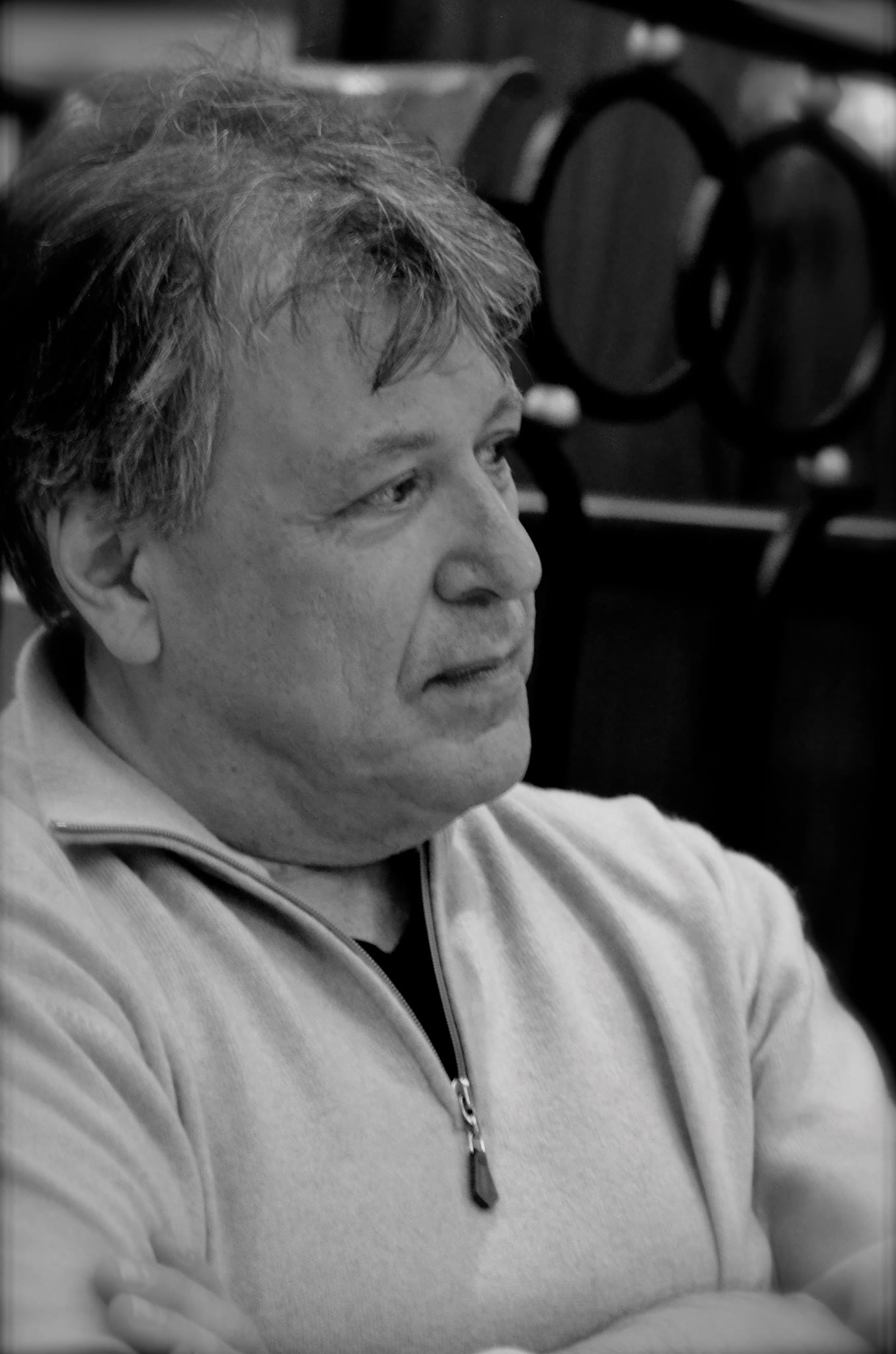
- Andrei Gavrilov, January 2017.
- Born: Andrei Vladimirovich Gavrilov / Андрей Владимирович Гаврилов (Russian); September 21, 1955 (age 70); Moscow, Soviet Union
- Education: Moscow Conservatory, Moscow
- Occupation: Pianist
- Years active: 1974–present
- Parent(s): Vladimir Gavrilov (father); Assanetta Eguiserian (mother)
- Musical career
- Instrument: Piano
- Labels: EMI; Melodiya; Deutsche Grammophon
- Website: andreigavrilov.com

Andrei Gavrilov (in Russian Андрей Гаврилов; born September 21, 1955) is a Russian-Swiss pianist.

== Early life and education ==
Andrei Gavrilov was born in Moscow. His father was Vladimir Gavrilov, a Russian painter, through whom Gavrilov also has German ancestors. His mother was the Armenian pianist Assanetta Eguiserian; she gave Gavrilov his first piano lessons at age 2.

In 1961, he was inducted to the Moscow Central Music School and became a student of Tatyana Kestner. He completed his studies with Lev Naumov at the Moscow Conservatory. By the age of 18, after one semester at the conservatory, he won the International Tchaikovsky Competition in 1974, where Melodiya recorded Tchaikovsky's first piano concerto at the prize winner's concert together with a live solo recital. He rose to international fame when, at the Salzburg Festival the same year, he substituted for Sviatoslav Richter. In 1976, a studio recording of Rachmaninoff's third concerto followed. Gavrilov performed in many major music centers of the world, performing up to 90 concerts a year while continuing his studies at the university until 1979.

== Career and later life ==
In 1979, Herbert von Karajan, who had heard him play Tchaikovsky's First Concerto in Berlin, offered to work with him on recordings of all the Rachmaninoff piano concertos. In December 1979, recording sessions were scheduled with the Berlin Philharmonic for the second concerto, but Gavrilov did not appear for the rehearsals. Due to his critical remarks about the Soviet government, the head of the KGB Yuri Andropov, with the approval of Leonid Brezhnev, had seized Gavrilov's passport and flight ticket and cut his telephone line. According to Gavrilov, he was put essentially under house arrest by the KGB. Militia guarding Gavrilov showed him an official paper signed by Andropov threatening his life. Through Mikhail Gorbachev's intervention, this ended in 1984, and Gavrilov received a passport so that he could perform again in the West without having to obtain political asylum. In the following years he briefly lived in London, England.

From 1977 to 1989 he worked exclusively for EMI. From that time came his recording of the Chopin Études and others of works by Chopin, Scriabin, Prokofiev, Rachmaninoff and J. S. Bach. From 1991 to 1993 he recorded for Deutsche Grammophon, where he also duplicated some works already recorded for EMI. A number of projects were announced in 1992 but not realized.

In 1989, he moved to Bad Camberg, Germany and received German citizenship. In 1993, he temporarily retired, cancelling concerts and not making further studio recordings. The planned two-year sabbatical eventually grew to eight years. During this time he studied composers and their works as well as religious and philosophical questions, lived for half a year in Fiji, and fundamentally reworked his piano technique. In 2001 he moved to Lucerne, Switzerland, and resumed playing concerts. In August 2008, he moved with his second wife and their son to Kanton Zürich.

In 2012, Andrei Gavrilov held master classes for the first time, in Madrid and later in London. In April 2013, Andrei Gavrilov performed a concert in Belgrade, playing and conducting three concertos with the Belgrade Philharmonic Orchestra. He played another concert conducting two concertos from the piano in Bristol in May 2014.

In 2013, he completed his three-volume autobiography, the first volume of which was published in Russian and German in March and April 2014, and in English in December 2016. He also made his first recording in 20 years, a CD of Chopin Nocturnes, to be included with each copy of the book.

== Discography ==
If not stated otherwise, recordings up to 1976 are released on Melodiya, those from 1977 to 1989 on EMI (in the beginning as a co-production with Melodiya), and those from 1991 to 1993 on Deutsche Grammophon.

1974

- Tchaikovsky: Piano Concerto No. 1; with USSR State Radio and Television Symphony Orchestra conducted by Dmitri Kitaenko (Final concert of the International Tchaikovsky Competition 1974 live).
- Haydn: Sonata E-flat major Hob. XVI/52; Scriabin: Etude op. 42/5; Liszt: La Campanella; Tchaikovsky: Variations op. 19/6; Ravel: Pavane pour une infante défunte; Scarbo from Gaspard de la nuit. (Tchaikovsky Variations live from the Tchaikovsky Competition).

1976

- Rachmaninoff: Piano Concerto No. 3; with ad hoc-orchestra consisting of members of the Moscow Philharmonic Orchestra and the USSR State Symphony Orchestra conducted by Alexander Lazarev

1977

- Prokofiev: Piano Concerto No. 1; 2 Pieces from Romeo and Juliet. Ravel: Piano Concerto for the Left Hand; Pavane pour une infante défunte. Concertos with London Symphony Orchestra conducted by Simon Rattle.
- Ravel: Gaspard de la nuit. Prokofiev: Suggestion diabolique. Liszt: La Campanella. Tchaikovsky: Variations, Op. 19/6. Balakirev: Islamey.
- Tchaikovsky: Piano Concerto No. 1; with Philharmonia Orchestra conducted by Riccardo Muti.
- Shostakovich: Violin Sonata, Op. 134. With Gidon Kremer (live from the Great Hall of the Moscow Conservatory). Melodiya.

1979

- Handel: Suites HWV 426, 429, 431, 432, 436, 437, 440, 447 (live from the Tours Festival on Chateau de Marcilly-sur-Maulne; the other suites played by Sviatoslav Richter).
- Prokofiev: 10 Pieces from Romeo and Juliet; Piano Sonata No. 8.
- Weber: Grand Duo Concertant, Op 48; Hindemith: Violin Sonata, Op. 11; Schnittke: Violin Sonata No. 2. With Gidon Kremer.

1981

- Beethoven: Piano Concerto No. 3, with USSR State Symphony Orchestra conducted by Yuri Temirkanov. Live, Melodiya.
- Weber: Grand Duo Concertant, Op. 48; Brahms: Clarinet Trio, Op 114; Berg: 4 Pieces for Clarinet and Piano. With Ivan Monighetti, violoncello and Anatoly Kamishev, clarinet. Melodiya.

1982

- J. S. Bach: Piano Concertos BWV 1052-1058, with Moscow Chamber Orchestra conducted by Yuri Nikolaevsky. Melodiya

1983

- Mozart: Piano Concerto No. 10; Mendelssohn: Concerto for 2 Pianos in E major. With Dang Thai Son, 2nd piano, and Moscow Chamber Orchestra conducted by Pavel Kogan. Melodiya.

1984

- J. S. Bach: French Suites.
- Rachmaninoff: Selections from Morceaux de Fantaisie, Op. 3, Moments Musicaux, Op, 16, Preludes, Op. 23, Preludes, Op. 32, Études-Tableaux, Op. 39.
- Scriabin: Sonata No. 4; Selection of Preludes Opp. 9/1; 11/2, 4–6, 8-14, 16, 18, 20, 22, 24; 13/1-3; 15/1, 5; 16/2, 4; Etude, Op. 42/5.

1984/1985

- Chopin: Piano Sonata No. 2; Ballades No. 1, No. 2, No. 3, No. 4

1985/1987

- Chopin: Etudes, Opp. 10, 25.

1986

- J. S. Bach: Piano Concertos BWV 1052–1058, with Academy of St Martin in the Fields conducted by Neville Marriner.
- Rachmaninoff: Piano Concerto No. 3, with Philadelphia Orchestra conducted by Riccardo Muti.

1987

- Schumann: Papillons, Carnaval, Faschingsschwank aus Wien.

1988

- Mozart: Piano Sonata No. 11 and No. 12; Fantasia, K.397; Prelude and Fugue K.394.
- Tchaikovsky: Piano Concerto No. 1 and No. 3, with Berlin Philharmonic Orchestra conducted by Vladimir Ashkenazy (live).

1989

- Rachmaninoff: Piano Concerto No. 2; Rhapsody on a Theme of Paganini; with Philadelphia Orchestra conducted by Riccardo Muti.
- Rachmaninoff: Piano Concerto No. 2; with Royal Philharmonic Orchestra conducted by Vladimir Ashkenazy (live in Moscow)
- Stravinsky: Concerto for Two Pianos; The Rite of Spring; Scherzo; Sonata for Two Pianos, with Vladimir Ashkenazy, Decca Records

1991

- Chopin: Piano Sonata No. 2; 4 Ballades
- Prokofiev: Piano Sonatas No. 3, No. 7, No. 8
- Schubert: Impromptus D. 899 and 935

1992:

- J. S. Bach: Goldberg Variations
- Britten: Friday Afternoons, Op. 7, Golden Vanity, Op. 78 (both with Wiener Sängerknaben); Sailing, Night, Ballad of Little Musgrave and Lady Barnard (all from Holiday Suite, Op. 5).
- Prokofiev: 10 Pieces from Romeo und Juliet; Suggestion diabolique. Prelude, Op 12/7. Ravel: Gaspard de la Nuit; Pavane pour une infante défunte.

1993

- J. S. Bach: French Suites.
- Grieg: Lyric Pieces, Opp. 12/1; 38/1; 43/1, 2, 6; 47/2-4; 54/1-5; 57/6; 62/4; 65/5-6; 68/3,5; 71/1-3, 6-7

1999

- Chopin: Piano Sonata No. 2; Ballades No. 1 and 4; Etudes Opp. 10/3-5, 9, 12. Live at Maulbronn Abbey, K&K Verlagsanstalt.

2014

- Chopin: 9 Nocturnes, No.1 in B flat minor, Op.9/1; No.8 in D flat major, Op.27/2; No.20 in C sharp minor, Op.posth.; No.5 in F sharp major, Op.15/2; No.9 in B major, Op.32/1; No.4 in F major, Op.15/1; No.15 in F minor, Op.55/1; No.10 in A flat major, Op.32/2; No.13 in C minor, Op.48/1 (recording: 17.5.2013 Fazioli Hall, Sacile, Italy)

2018

- Modest Mussorgsky: "Pictures at an exhibition". UCM records. "Unzipped Classical Music". New private Andrei Gavrilov own label.

2020

- Robert Schumann : "Symphonic Etudes" op 13, "Papillons" op 2

UCM records. "Unzipped Classical Music". Private Andrei Gavrilov own label.

== Other recordings ==
=== TV ===
1979

- Shostakovich: Sonata for Violin and Piano. Weber: Grand Duo Concertant, Op 48; Adagio from Violin Sonata, Op 10/2. Rossini: Andante con Variazione. With Gidon Kremer, violin. WDR/EMI Laserdisc

1985

- He appeared in the 1985 Tony Palmer film about Handel God Rot Tunbridge Wells!, playing the passacaglia from the Keyboard suite in G minor (HWV 432).

1989

- Rachmaninoff: Piano Concerto No. 2; with Royal Philharmonic Orchestra conducted by Vladimir Ashkenazy (live in Moscow) BBC/EMI VHS

1990

- Prokofiev: Suggestion diabolique; "Montagues and Capulets" (from: 10 Pieces from Romeo and Juliet ); Piano Sonata No. 8. Gavrilov also speaks about the works with British Composer Michael Berkeley in English, subtitles in German. Südwestfunk.
- Rachmaninoff: Moment musical, Op. 16/3; Elegy, Op. 3/1. Südwestfunk.
- Scriabin: Prelude, Op. 9; 4th piano sonata; Etude, Op. 42/5. Südwestfunk

2000

- J.S. Bach: Well-Tempered Clavier, Book No. 1, Preludes & Fugues No.s 1-12. BBC Wales/Euroarts DVD

2020

- Japan recital: Tokyo, https://www.youtube.com/watch?v=Y7NigtcQ1OE

=== Radio ===
2009

- Chopin: Nocturnes, Opp. 9/1, 27/2, posth., 15/2, 32/1, 15/1, 55/1, 32/2. Prokofiev: Piano Sonata No. 8; Suggestion diabolique, Op. 4/4. Scarlatti: Sonata in D minor, L.366/K.1. Hessischer Rundfunk live.

=== Other recordings ===
2006

- Chopin: Nocturnes, Opp. 9/1, posth., 15/2, 15/1, 55/1, 32/2, 48/1. Live from the Lucerne Festival.
