= Nocturne in B major =

Nocturne in B major may refer to:

- Nocturne in B major, Op. 9, No. 3, by Frédéric Chopin
- Nocturne in B major, Op. 32, No. 1, by Frédéric Chopin
- Nocturne in B major, Op. 62, No. 1, by Frédéric Chopin
- Nocturne in B major (Dvořák) by Antonín Dvořák
