= Three Nocturnes =

Three Nocturnes can refer to

- Nocturnes, Op. 15 (Chopin)
- Nocturnes, Op. 9 (Chopin)
- Nocturnes (Debussy)
