= Berceuse (Chopin) =

1844 piano composition by F. Chopin

- Piano lullaby by Frédéric Chopin
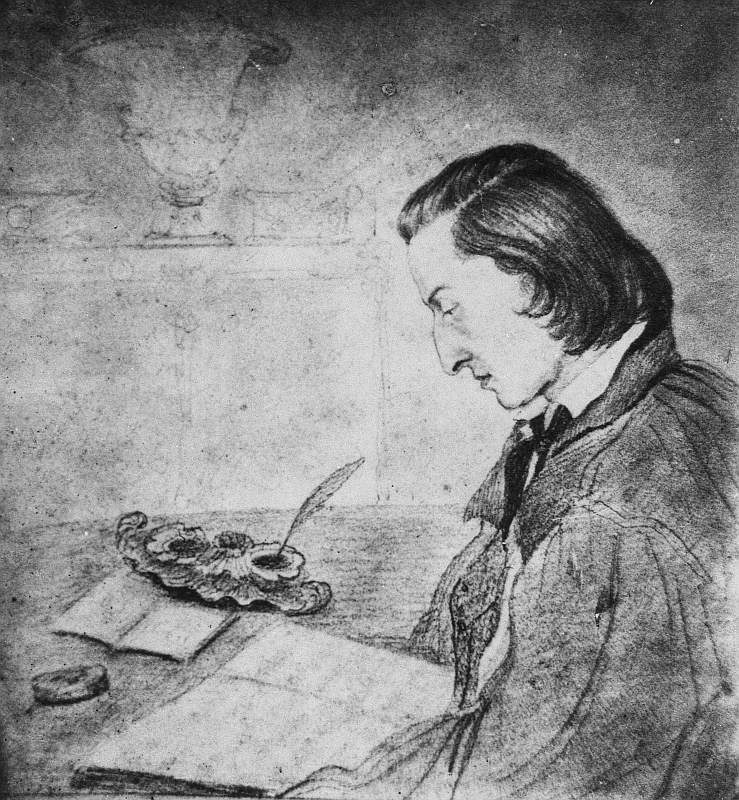
- Pencil drawing of the composer by George Sand, 1841
- Other name: Variantes
- Key: D-flat major
- Opus: 57
- Form: variations
- Composed: 1843–44
- Dedication: Élise Gavard
- Published: 1844

Frédéric Chopin's "Berceuse", Op. 57, is a lullaby written for the piano. He composed it in 1843/44 as variations in D-flat major. Chopin originally called his work "Variantes". "Berceuse" was first published in Paris in 1844 by Jean-Racine Meissonnier, dedicated to Chopin's pupil Élise Gavard, and appeared in London and Leipzig the following year.

Written late in his career, the lyrical piece features complex figurations in the continuous flow of variations on a calm bass in always soft dynamics, shaping the music by texture and sonority.

== History ==
Chopin began the composition in the summer of 1843 at Nohant, where he stayed with George Sand. As the first manuscript was held by the singer Pauline Viardot, the composition may have been inspired by her little daughter, Louisette, who also spent the summer there while her mother was away giving concerts. The theme of the "Berceuse" echos a song that Chopin may have heard in his childhood, "Już miesiąć zeszedł, psy się uśpily" (The moon now has risen, the dogs are asleep).

Chopin completed "Berceuse" in 1844, shortly before his Piano Sonata in B minor. It is a series of 16 variations on an ostinato ground bass. In an early sketch of the composition, the "variantes" were even assigned numbers. Chopin first began the work with the theme but wrote two measures of introduction later.

At first the composer titled the work "Variantes", but the title was altered for publication to the current "Berceuse", berceuse literally meaning "cradle song". It was first published by Jean-Racine Meissonnier of Paris in 1844 and was dedicated to Élise Gavard (1824–1900), saying on the title page: Berceuse / pour le piano / dédié à / Mademoiselle Élise Gavard / par / F. Chopin. The first publication in England was by Wessel & Co. in London on 22 June 1845, and the first publication in Germany was by Breitkopf & Härtel in Leipzig in July 1845.

== Structure and music ==
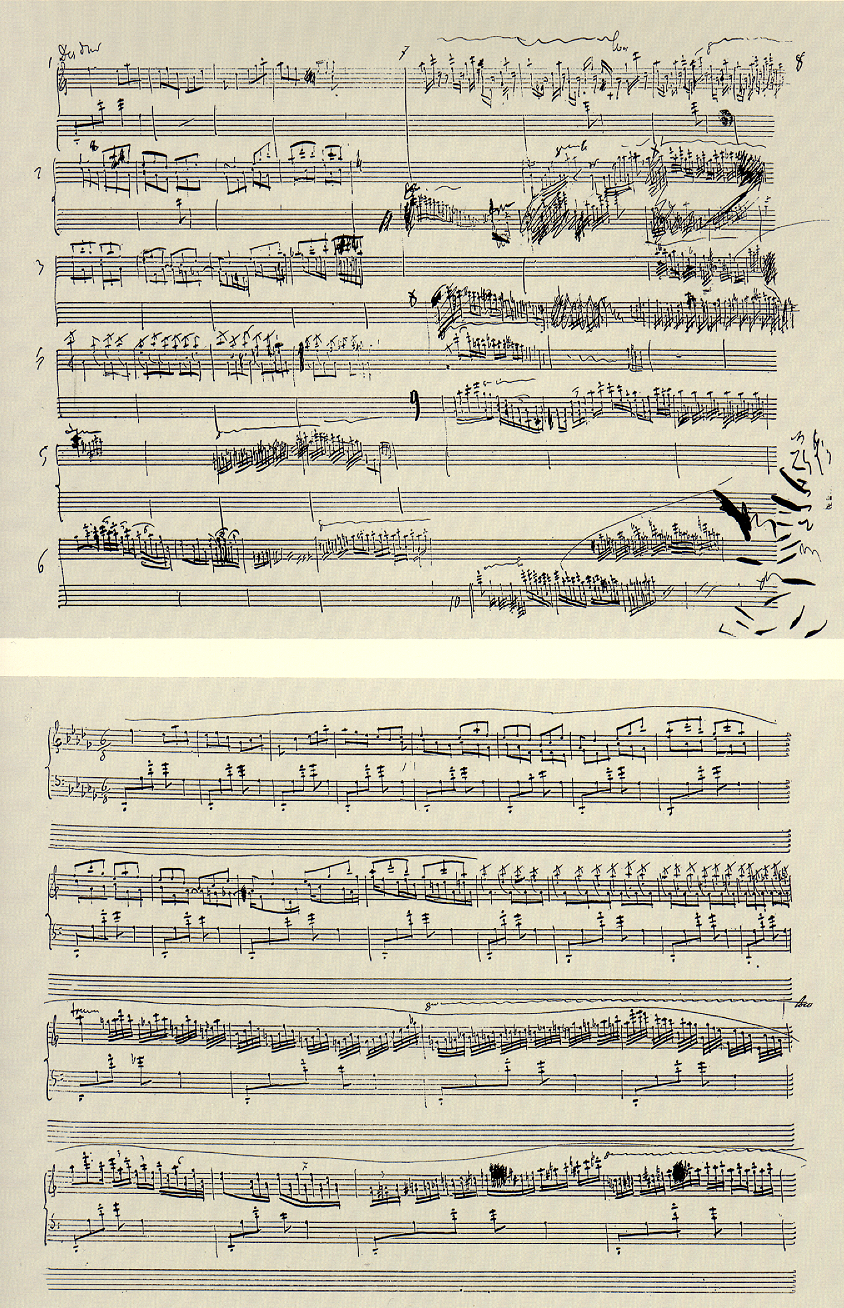
Sketch page and first page of the manuscript

"Berceuse"
Performed by Christine Hartley-Troskie

Chopin composed the work as a series of 16 short variations on an ostinato ground bass. He first began the work with the theme but wrote two measures of introduction later. The music begins and ends in 6/8 time. The variations of four measures are not divided by rests, but form a steady flow. Several variations show highly independent ornamental lines in complex rapid filigree, contrasting with the stable bass. The dynamics stay low throughout the piece. Sonority and texture shape the music, which the musicologist Jim Samson describes as a "sense of departure and return". He notes that Claude Debussy was interested in this aspect of Chopin's music. Only once, shortly before the end, does the bass change.

Zdzisław Jachimecki described the composition as follows:

At first the melody of the Berceuse shows itself in its entirety. It is joined by the middle voice, which with its syncopations banters with the theme [bars 7–10]. Subsequently, the theme sounds solely in grace notes [bars 15–18]. Finally, it is pulverised into some luminous dust, transformed into a volatile state of almost immaterial little passages, trills and fioriture [bars 44–46]. Then (in the ending) it returns in its original form [bars 63–66].

Jean-Jacques Eigeldinger sees the "Berceuse" as a "late lyrical piece", together with the Barcarolle, Op. 60, and the Nocturne, Op. 62, No. 1, all of them full of "pianistic figurations" reminiscent of his early "brilliant" style. Eigeldinger has suggested that Chopin's style in these pieces "approaches that of musical symbolism/impressionism".

== Recordings on period pianos ==
Pianist	Piano	Label	Recording year
Peter Katin	Collard & Collard square piano (c. 1836)	Diversions	1996
Yves Henry	Pleyel (1836-1837)	Soupir Editions	2010
Alexei Lubimov	Upright Pleyel piano (1843)	Fryderyk Chopin Institute	2019
Nicolai Demidenko	Pleyel (1848)	Fryderyk Chopin Institute	2008
Sam Haywood	Pleyel (1848)	The Cobbe Collection Trust	2010
Ronald Brautigam	Erard (1842)	VPRO	1991
Tatiana Shebanova	Erard (1849)	Fryderyk Chopin Institute	2007
