= Nocturnes, Op. 37 (Chopin) =

Nocturnes for solo piano

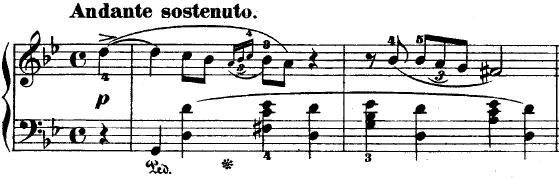
Opening bars of Opus 37 No. 1.

The Nocturnes, Op. 37 are a set of two nocturnes for solo piano written by Frédéric Chopin in 1839 during the time of his stay with author George Sand in Mallorca and published in 1840. Unusually, neither piece carries a dedication.

This set of nocturnes was originally considered to be one of the better sets, yet its popularity slowly decreased in the twentieth century. Blair Johnson maintains, however, that the pieces are still "wonderful specimens, being something of a hybrid between the more dramatic Opus 27 and the far simpler textures and moods of Opus 32." Robert Schumann commented that they were "of that nobler kind under which poetic ideality gleams more transparently." Schumann also said that the "two nocturnes differ from his earlier ones chiefly through greater simplicity of decoration and more quiet grace."

Gustav Barth commented that Chopin's nocturnes are definite signs of "progress" in comparison to John Field's original nocturnes, though the improvements are "for the most part only in technique." However, David Dubal feels that the pieces are "more aptly described as ballades in miniature."

== Pieces ==
=== No. 1 in G minor ===
Nocturne in G minor, Op. 37 No. 1

The nocturne in G minor is initially marked as andante sostenuto and is in 4/4 meter. In measure 41, the key changes to E♭ major and returns to G minor in measure 67. The piece is a total of 91 measures long, ending with a Picardy third, and is in ternary form. One of Chopin's students, Adolphe Gutmann, claimed that Chopin himself forgot to mark the increase in tempo for the chorale, which led to the section being played too slowly.

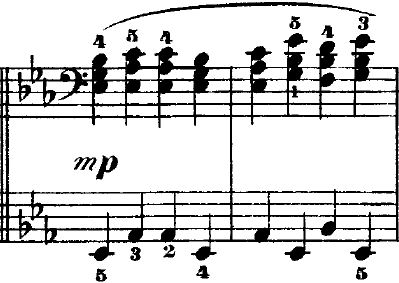
Chorale-like middle section of Opus 37 No. 1.

James Friskin commented that the nocturne is "one of the simpler nocturnes" and is similar to the Nocturne in G minor, Op. 15, No. 3 in that it "has similar legato chord passages in the contrasting section" though this nocturne "has a more ornamental melodic line". Dubal also agreed that the nocturne is "of lesser importance." Critics, however, have often pointed to the potential allusion to religion in the middle section. Maurycy Karasowski commented that the middle section has "a church-like atmosphere in chords." Johnson also thought the chords to be "chorale-like" and commented that "some biographers have felt that this music represented Chopin's faith in the consoling power of religion."

=== No. 2 in G major ===
Nocturne in G major, Op. 37 No. 2
Recording by Olga Gurevich (Musopen)

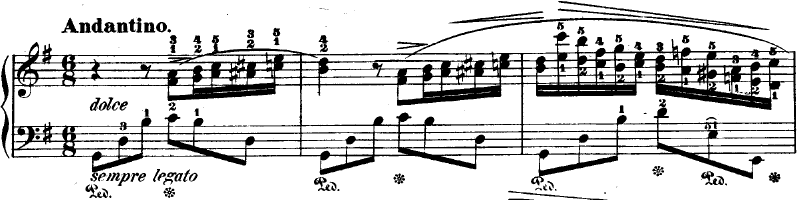
Opening bars of Opus 37 No. 2

The nocturne in G major is initially marked as andantino and is in 6/8 meter, remaining so for all 139 measures. It is written in the style of a Venetian barcarolle, which, according to Dubal, is engendered by the main theme's "euphonious thirds and sixths". Huneker commented that "pianists usually take the first part too fast, the second too slowly" and play the piece like an étude. Friskin commented that the sixths "require care to get evenness of tone control." The piece has the structure A–B–A–B–A, somewhat unusual for a Chopin nocturne. The melody in thirds and sixths is similarly unusual, all other Chopin nocturnes opening with single-voice melodies.

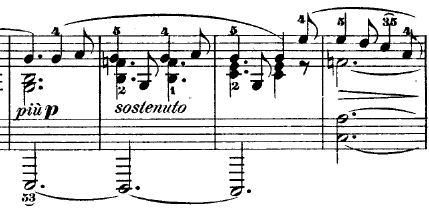
Secondary theme of Opus 37 No. 2

The nocturne has been acclaimed as one of the most beautiful melodies that Chopin has ever composed. Both Karasowski and Huneker agreed with this assessment; Karasowski claimed that "one can never listen [to the nocturne] without a sense of the deepest emotion and happiness," and Huneker commented that the nocturne was "painted with Chopin's most ethereal brush". Frederick Niecks also thought the piece had "a beautiful sensuousness; it is luscious, soft, rounded, and not without a certain degree of languor." To Blair Johnson, the theme is "certainly a musical embodiment of the 'less is more' doctrine." Johnson also commented that "something of the warmer Mediterranean climate crept into the composer's pen," in reference to Chopin's stay on the island of Mallorca. Niecks also said that the nocturne "bewitches and unmans," pointing to the formerly popular view that Chopin's music could act as an aphrodisiac. Similarly, Louis Kentner once said, in reference to this nocturne, that the nocturnes should not "suffer critical degradation because sentimental young ladies used them, in days long gone by, to comfort their repressed libido."
