= In the Night (ballet) =

Ballet choreographed by Jerome Robbins

- Choreographer: Jerome Robbins
- Music: Frédéric Chopin
- Premiere: January 29, 1970; New York State Theater
- Original ballet company: New York City Ballet
- Design: Anthony Dowell
- Genre: Neoclassical ballet

In the Night is a ballet choreographed by Jerome Robbins to four nocturnes by Frédéric Chopin. It premiered on January 29, 1970 at the New York State Theater, performed by the New York City Ballet.

== Structure ==
In the Night features three couples, depicted at different phases of their relationships. The first duet, set to Chopin's Nocturne in C sharp minor, Op. 27, No. 1, shows a pair of young lovers. On the choreography of this section, Deborah Jowitt, the author of Robbins' biography, wrote, "Over and over he lifts her or twines her through delicate balances; they separate only to rush together."

The second, to Nocturnes in F minor and E flat major, Op. 55, Nos. 1 and 2. Violette Verdy, who created the female role, interpreted the duet as a happy marriage with some drama to prevent it from "coagulating." Jowitt commented that this duet is "more settled... with a hint of a folk-dance step, she always confident that he will be there to support her." The pas de deux ends with the man kneel down to support the woman's arabesque, before lifting her up to let her kneel on his shoulder and walk off stage backward.

The last is set to Nocturne in E flat major, Op. 9, No. 2. This duet depicts a couple that is about to break up. Jowitt described, "Their dancing is full of passion and artifice; they’re being melodramatic for each other… One minute they are involved in flashy, tempestuous lifts; the next minute one of them rushes offstage." New York Times's dance critic Jack Anderson wrote, "Life for them was an eternal cycle of quarrels and reconciliations. However, one suspected that, if they could not always live peacefully together, they could not bear to live long apart." At the end of this pas de deux, the two look at each other, the woman then sinks to the floor as she gently touches the man. He picks her up to a high lift, then as Jowitt described, "drops her into his arms, and carries her away."

At the end of the ballet, all three couples briefly appear on stage together, before leaving for their separate ways, with the men lifting their partners off stage.

== Original cast ==
The original cast consisted of:

- Kay Mazzo
- Violette Verdy
- Patricia McBride
- Anthony Blum
- Peter Martins
- Francisco Moncion

== Production ==
Robbins began choreographing In the Night in late September 1969. several months after the premiere of his last Chopin ballet, Dances at a Gathering, although he went on vacation in November. In the Night is a followup to Dances at a Gathering, which McBride described as "a continuation in the same vein." Robbins intended McBride's role for Melissa Hayden, who withdrew from the ballet. Moncion, who had been dancing with the New York City Ballet since 1946 (with the company's forerunner Ballet Society), had stopped dancing virtuosic and intense roles, so in In the Night, Robbins' made use of his charisma.

The original costumes were designed by fashion illustrator Joe Eula, but were subsequently replaced by attires by The Royal Ballet artistic director Anthony Dowell. In the ballet, women are dressed in long tulle dresses, and the men in waistcoats.

== Performances ==
In the Night premiered on January 29, 1970 at the New York State Theater. George Balanchine did not like In the Night, as Jowitt put it, "he couldn't bear to see one abasing herself before a man." Despite positive reviews from the premiere, the New York City Ballet did not revive the ballet the following year. In a letter to the company's co-founder Lincoln Kirstein, Robbins wrote that he was shocked "because no one had informed me that you both felt it was unworthy." Thenceforth, the ballet was revived by the New York City Ballet regularly.

The ballet had also been revived by Paris Opera Ballet, The Royal Ballet and San Francisco Ballet. At New York City Ballet's "A Festival of Jerome Robbins's Ballets," held in 1990, six dancers from the Paris Opera Ballet were invited to dance In the Night in New York. In March 1999, eight months after Robbins died, Paris Opera Ballet performed In the Night at a Robbins tribute gala. In the Night was included in New York City Ballet's Robbins centenary celebration.
