= Nocturne in C minor =

Nocturne in C minor may refer to:

- Nocturne in C minor, Op. 48, No. 1, by Frédéric Chopin
- Nocturne in C minor, Op. posth. (Chopin) by Frédéric Chopin
