= Meissonier =

Meissonier or Meissonnier is the name of several people:

- Jean-Louis-Ernest Meissonier (1815–1891), French classicist painter and sculptor famous for his depictions of Napoleon, his armies and military themes
- Jean-Antoine Meissonnier (1783–1857), French music publisher and composer for the guitar
- Jean-Racine Meissonnier (1794–1856), French music publisher, brother of Jean-Antoine
- Antoine-Édouard Meissonnier (1820–1866), French music publisher, son of Jean-Racine
- Philippe-Eugène Meissonnier (1823–1849), French music publisher, son of Jean-Racine
- Juste-Aurèle Meissonnier (1695–1750), the usual spelling for the French goldsmith, sculptor, painter, architect, and furniture designer
