= Vadim Chaimovich =

Lithuanian pianist

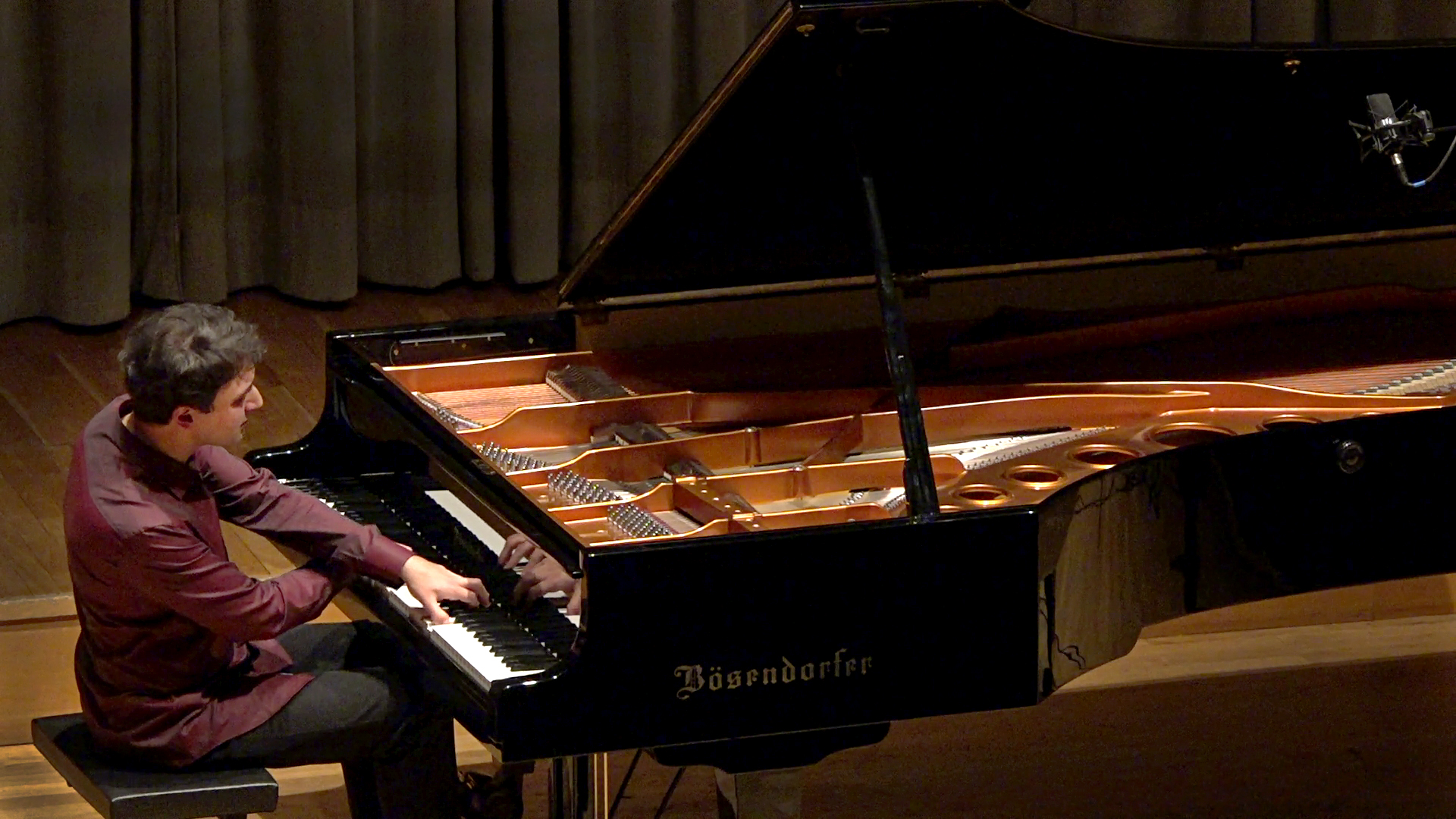
Vadim Chaimovich performing at the Onoldia Concert Hall in Ansbach, Germany, on October 22, 2015

Vadim Chaimovich (Russian: Вадим Хаймович; born 1978 in Vilnius) is a Lithuanian pianist.

== Biography ==
He began studying piano at the age of five, giving his USSR debut performance with an orchestra just two years later. He won several prizes while at the Vilnius School of Music, including the First Prize at the Virtuosi per Musica di Pianoforte International Competition in Ústí nad Labem (Czech Republic) in 1991. This was followed by more awards at international music competitions in Lithuania, Poland and Russia. Chaimovich is a graduate with honors from a few conservatoires of music. His teachers were two distinguished musicians: Lev Natochenny, a professor of piano at the Frankfurt University of Music and Performing Arts, and Peter Rösel, a renowned pianist from Dresden, both of them students of the legendary Lev Oborin. International master classes with such remarkable artists as Claude Frank, Rudolf Kehrer, Gary Graffman and Eugen Indjic contributed significantly to his education.

Chaimovich received prizes at many international piano competitions, including the Schubert Competition in Dortmund (Germany), the Schlern Music Competition (Italy), the William Kapell International Piano Competition in Maryland (USA) and the 29th Masterplayers International Music Competition in Lugano (Switzerland). He is also the winner of the 2009 10th International Web Concert Hall Competition (USA). As the First Prize winner of the 2009 Bradshaw & Buono International Piano Competition (New York) he recently gave his debut performance in Weill Recital Hall at Carnegie Hall. He was awarded scholarships and awards by such European foundations as the Da-Ponte Foundation (Darmstadt), the Ottilie Selbach Redslob Foundation and Gotthard Schierse Foundation (Berlin), the Open Lithuanian Foundation, Alfred & Ilse Stammer-Mayer Foundation (Switzerland) etc. In 2003, Chaimovich's outstanding artistry was distinguished with the Promotion Prize of the Dresden Art and Culture Foundation.

He has given concerts in Switzerland, Poland, Hungary, Austria, France, Germany, Italy, Japan and the US, among others at the Kulturpalast and the Semperoper (Dresden), the Paderewski Hall (Lausanne), the Theatre du Vevey, the Cortot Hall (Paris), the Grand Opera House (Cairo), the Clarice Smith Performing Arts Center (College Park/USA), the Great Hall of the Moscow Conservatoire, the Sendai City Cultural Center (Japan) and at such international music festivals as the Meranofest (Italy), the Verbier Festival (Switzerland), the Schlern International Music Festival (Italy), the Styraburg Fest (Austria), the Dresden Music Festival, the Kassel Music Festival and the Schleswig-Holstein Music Festival (Germany).

He collaborated with the Lithuanian Chamber Orchestra, the Sinfonietta Dresden, the Dortmund Philharmonic Orchestra, the North Hungarian Symphony Orchestra, the Orchestra Filarmonica di Bacau and the Chamber Orchestra of Central Germany.

With over 243 million views (in July 2024), Vadim Chaimovich's interpretation of Frédéric Chopin's Nocturne in E-flat Major, Op. 9 No. 2 is one of the most viewed classical music videos and the most popular recording of a composition by Chopin on YouTube.

His recording of Edvard Grieg's lyric piece «Arietta, Op. 12, No. 1» can be heard in Tom Tykwer's drama television series Babylon Berlin (2017 – 2018) (Season 1 Episode 7)

== Disсography ==
- 2008: "Haydn & Mozart", piano sonatas by Haydn and Mozart (Sheva Collection)
- 2010: Piano works by Chopin, Mendelssohn and Rachmaninoff (Sheva Collection)
- 2013: "Kontraste", piano works by Galuppi, Beethoven, Chopin, Schubert, Schumann and Medtner (Sheva Collection)
- 2015–2017: Three digital albums including compositions by Mozart, Schubert, Chopin, Mendelssohn, Brahms, Rachmaninoff and others (Lynne Publishing AS)
- 2018–2023: Over twenty digital albums spanning a wide range of compositions by Baroque, Classical and Romantic composers (Halidon)
