= Nocturnes (Chopin) =

19th-century solo piano composition series

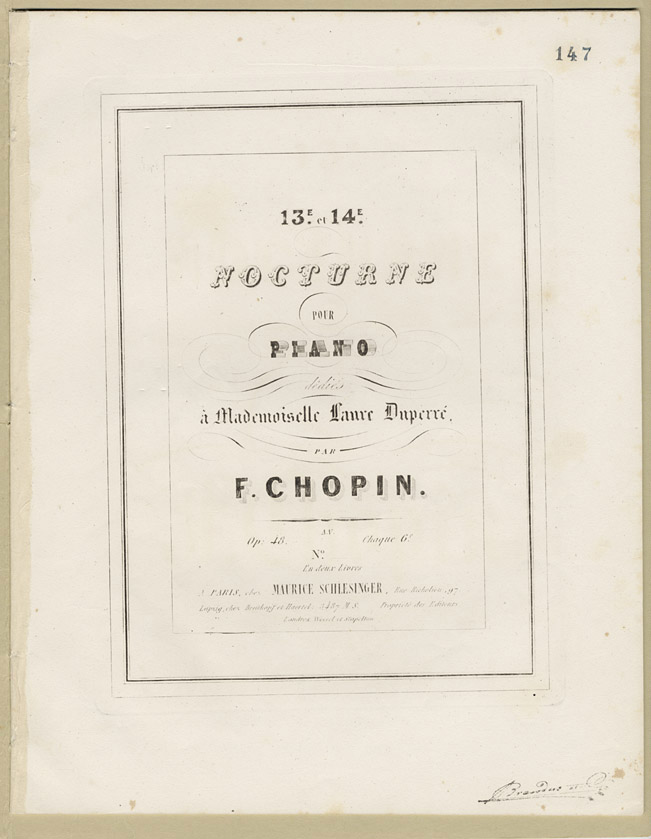
Cover page of Chopin's Nocturnes Op. 48

Frédéric Chopin wrote 21 nocturnes for solo piano between 1827 and 1846. They are generally considered among the finest short solo works for the instrument and hold an important place in contemporary concert repertoire. Although Chopin did not invent the nocturne, he popularized and expanded on it, building on the form developed by Irish composer John Field.

Chopin's nocturnes numbered 1 to 18 were published during his lifetime, in twos or threes, in the order of composition. However, numbers 19 and 20 were actually written first, prior to Chopin's departure from Poland, but published posthumously. Number 21 was not originally entitled "nocturne" at all, but since its publication in 1938 as such, it is generally included with publications and recordings of the set.

== Influences ==
By the time of Chopin's birth in 1810, John Field was already an accomplished composer. Eventually, the young Chopin became a great admirer of Field, taking some influence from the Irish composer's playing and composing technique. Chopin had composed five of his nocturnes before meeting Field for the first time.

In his youth, Chopin was often told that he sounded like Field, who in turn was later described as sounding "Chopinesque". The composer Friedrich Kalkbrenner, one of Chopin's early influences, once inquired as to whether Chopin was a student of Field. While Chopin held Field in high respect and considered him one of his primary influences, Field had a rather negative view of Chopin's work. Upon meeting Chopin and hearing his nocturnes in 1832, Field is said to have described the composer as a "sickroom talent". Nonetheless, Chopin still admired Field and his work and continued to take inspiration throughout his life.

Chopin's nocturnes carry many similarities with those of Field while at the same time retaining a distinct, unique sound of their own. One aspect of the nocturne that Chopin continued from Field is the use of a song-like melody in the right hand. This is one of the most if not the most important features to the nocturne as a whole. The use of the melody as vocals bestowed a greater emotional depth to the piece, drawing the listener in to a greater extent. Along with the right-hand melody, Chopin continued the use of another nocturne "necessity", that of playing broken chords on the left hand to act as the rhythm under his right-handed "vocal" melody. Another technique used by Field and continued by Chopin was the more extensive use of the pedal. By using the pedal more, the music gains more emotional expression through sustained notes, giving the piece an aura of drama. With these main attributes of the "Field nocturne" Chopin was inspired, and expanded upon them to develop the "Chopin nocturne".

One of the greatest innovations made by Chopin to the nocturne was his use of a more freely flowing rhythm, a technique based on the classical music style. Also, Chopin further developed the structure of the nocturne, taking inspiration from the Italian and French opera arias, as well as the sonata form. Composer Franz Liszt even insisted that Chopin's nocturnes were influenced by Vincenzo Bellini's bel canto arias, a statement affirmed and echoed by many in the music world. A further innovation of Chopin's was his use of counterpoint to create tension in the nocturnes, a method that even further expanded the dramatic tone and feel of the piece itself. It was mainly through these themes of operatic influence, freer rhythms, and an expansion into more complex structures and melodic playing that Chopin made his mark on the nocturne. Many think of the "Chopin nocturne" as a mix between the form and structure of Field and the sound of Mozart, displaying a classic/romantic-influenced theme within the music.

== Legacy ==
When first published, Chopin's nocturnes were met with mixed reactions from critics. However, through time, many who had initially been displeased with the nocturnes found themselves retracting previous criticisms, holding the compositions in high regard.

While the popularity of individual nocturnes has varied considerably since Chopin's death, they have retained a significant position in piano repertoire, with the Op. 9 No. 2 in E♭ major and the Op. 27 No. 2 in D♭ major perhaps the most enduringly popular.

Various composers from both Chopin's lifetime and later have expressed their influences from his work with nocturnes. Such artists as Johannes Brahms and Richard Wagner display similar melodic techniques and styles in their music to those of Chopin. Other composers such as Mendelssohn, Schumann, and Liszt described the genius that lay within Chopin's nocturnes. It is clear that these piano compositions made a noticeable and lasting impact on music and composition during the romantic period. The most important later composer of nocturnes was Gabriel Fauré, who greatly admired Chopin and composed thirteen works in this genre. Other later composers who have written solo piano nocturnes include Georges Bizet, Erik Satie, Alexander Scriabin, Francis Poulenc, Samuel Barber, Sergei Rachmaninoff, and Lowell Liebermann.

== List of nocturnes ==
No.	Key	Opus	Pub.	Comp.	Incipit	Sound
1	B♭ minor	Op. 9 No. 1	1832	1830–32		Florence Robineau
2	E♭ major	Op. 9 No. 2	1832	1830–32		Martha Goldstein
3	B major	Op. 9 No. 3	1832	1830–32		Patrizia Prati
4	F major	Op. 15 No. 1	1833	1830–32		
5	F♯ major	Op. 15 No. 2	1833	1830–32		
6	G minor	Op. 15 No. 3	1833	1833		Olga Gurevich
7	C♯ minor	Op. 27 No. 1	1837	1836		
8	D♭ major	Op. 27 No. 2	1837	1836		
9	B major	Op. 32 No. 1	1837	1837		
10	A♭ major	Op. 32 No. 2	1837	1837		
11	G minor	Op. 37 No. 1	1840	1838		
12	G major	Op. 37 No. 2	1840	1839		Olga Gurevich
13	C minor	Op. 48 No. 1	1841	1841		Luke Faulkner
14	F♯ minor	Op. 48 No. 2	1841	1841		Luke Faulkner
15	F minor	Op. 55 No. 1	1844	1842–44		
16	E♭ major	Op. 55 No. 2	1844	1842–44		
17	B major	Op. 62 No. 1	1846	1846		
18	E major	Op. 62 No. 2	1846	1846		
19	E minor	Op. 72 No. 1	1855	1827–29		Peter Johnston
20	C♯ minor	P. 1 No. 16	1870	1830		Aaron Dunn
21	C minor	P. 2 No. 8	1938	1837 (47–48?)		Diana Hughes

=== Spurious nocturnes ===
- Nocturne in C-sharp minor, KK Anh. Ia/6, a.k.a Nocturne oublié(e) or Nocturne No. 22 (publication date unknown).
