= Consolations (Liszt) =

Compositions for piano by Franz Liszt

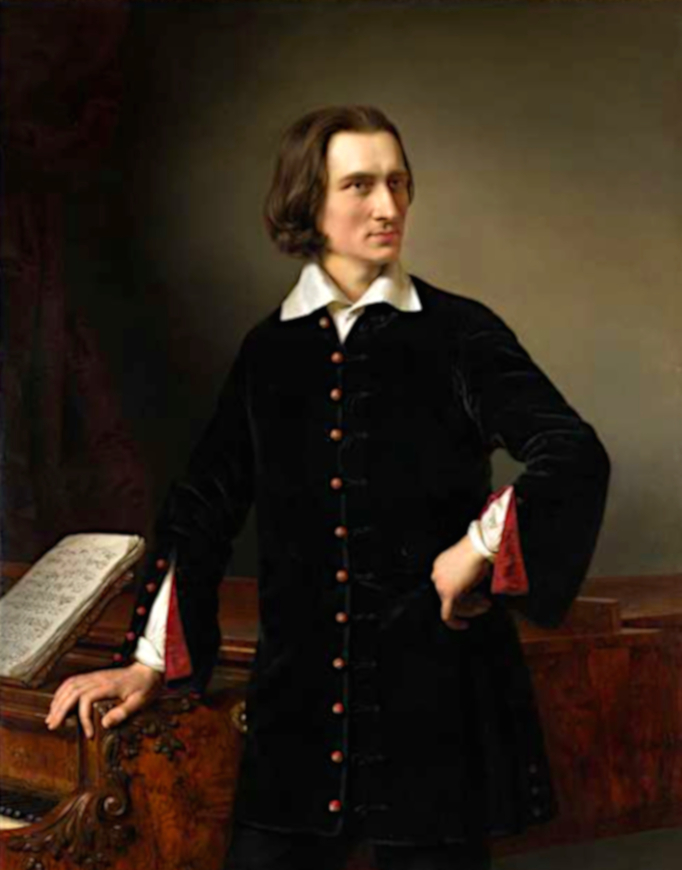
Franz Liszt, portrait by Hungarian painter Miklós Barabás, 1847

The Consolations, S. 171a/172 (German: Tröstungen) are a set of six solo piano works by Franz Liszt. The compositions take the musical style of nocturnes with each having its own distinctive style. Each Consolation is composed in either the key of E major or D♭ major. E major is a key regularly used by Liszt for religious themes.

There exist two versions of the Consolations. The first (S. 171a) was composed by Liszt between 1844 and 1849 and published in 1992 by G. Henle Verlag. The second (S. 172) was composed between 1849 and 1850 and published in 1850 by Breitkopf & Härtel, containing the familiar Consolation No. 3, Lento placido, in D♭ major.

== Title ==
The source of the title Consolations may have been Lamartine's poem "Une larme, ou Consolation" from the poetry collection Harmonies poétiques et religieuses (Poetic and Religious Harmonies). Liszt's piano cycle Harmonies poétiques et religieuses is based on Lamartine's collection of poems. Another possible inspiration for the title are the Consolations of the French literary historian Charles Sainte-Beuve. Sainte-Beuve's Consolations, published in 1830, is a collection of Romantic era poetry where friendship is extolled as a consolation for the loss of religious faith.

The Consolations are also referred to as Six pensées poétiques (Six poetic thoughts), a title not used for Breitkopf's 1850 publication but for a set published shortly thereafter, in the same year, by the Bureau Central de Musique in Paris.

== First version (S. 171a) ==
The Consolations, S. 171a, consist of six solo compositions for the piano.

1. Andante con moto (E major)
2. Un poco più mosso (E major)
3. Lento, quasi recitativo (E major/C♯ minor)
4. Quasi Adagio, cantabile con devozione (D♭ major)
5. Andantino (E major) – "Madrigal"
6. Allegretto (G major)

Composed between 1844 and 1849, they are Liszt's first version of the Consolations and were first published in 1992 by G. Henle Verlag. The manuscripts are located at the Goethe and Schiller Archives in Weimar.

The third Consolation is an arrangement of a Hungarian folksong that would be later reused by Liszt in his Hungarian Rhapsody No.1, S.244/1. The fifth Consolation is the earliest of the compositions and dates from 1844. In an early manuscript, the fifth Consolation is entitled “Madrigal”. Liszt dedicated the Madrigal to a friend of his, a Weimar Intendant named M. de Ziegäser.

== Second version (S. 172) ==
The Consolations, S. 172, consist of six solo compositions for the piano.

1. Andante con moto (E major)
2. Un poco più mosso (E major)
3. Lento placido (D♭ major)
4. Quasi Adagio (D♭ major)
5. Andantino (E major)
6. Allegretto sempre cantabile (E major)

Composed between 1849 and 1850, they are Liszt's second version of the Consolations. This version of the Consolations is better known than the first version and was published in 1850 in Leipzig by Breitkopf & Härtel. In comparison to the first version of the Consolations, the original third Consolation (S. 171a/3) was replaced with a new Consolation (Lento placido in D♭ major) and the remaining Consolations were simplified.

=== Consolations Nos. 1 and 2 ===
The first of the Consolations is in E major and initially marked Andante con moto. The shortest of the set, consisting of just 25 measures, it has an identical opening to another of Liszt's works, the Album-Leaf (Première Consolation), S. 171b. Consolation No. 2 is also in E major and is initially marked Un poco più mosso. It is often played directly after the first, without a break.

=== Consolation No. 3 ===
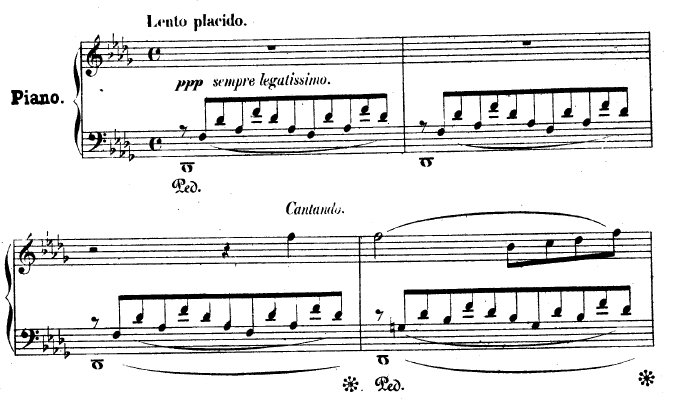
Consolation No. 3, first few bars

Consolation No. 3, Lento placido
Benedict Kramer, piano (3:46)

The third Consolation is in D♭ major and initially marked as Lento placido. It is the most popular of the Consolations and also a favorite encore piece.

Its style is similar to Chopin's Nocturnes; in particular, it seems to have been inspired by Chopin's Nocturne Op. 27 No. 2. The similarity between the two works has been interpreted as a tribute to Chopin who died in 1849, a year before the Consolations were published. This third Consolation is however one of several of Liszt's works that take a style reminiscent of Chopin; some examples include Liszt's Polonaises, Berceuse, Mazurka brillante, and his Ballades.

In 1883, years after composing the Consolation, Liszt received a Grand piano from the Steinway Company with a design that included a sostenuto pedal. Liszt began transcribing this Consolation for the new sostenuto pedal and in a letter to Steinway he wrote:

In relation to the use of your welcome tone-sustaining pedal I inclose two examples: Danse des Sylphes, by Berlioz, and No. 3 of my Consolations. I have today noted down only the introductory bars of both pieces, with this proviso, that, if you desire it, I shall gladly complete the whole transcription, with exact adaptation of your tone-sustaining pedal.

Liszt recommended sparing usage of the sostenuto pedal in the interpretation of this Consolation and opined on the positive effect it would have on the more tranquil passages.

=== Consolation No. 4 ===
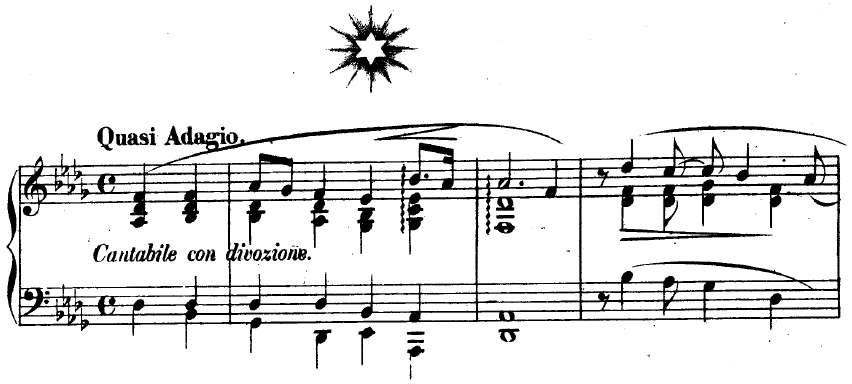
Consolation No. 4, first few bars

Consolation No. 4, Quasi Adagio
Performed by Constantin Stephan

Consolation No. 4 is in D♭ major and is initially marked Quasi adagio. Composed in 1849, it is also known as the Stern-Consolation (Star Consolation) because of the six-pointed white star that appears on the printed score. The Consolation was inspired by a Lied written by Maria Pavlovna, the Grand Duchess of Saxe-Weimar-Eisenach. The mood of the composition has been described as "churchly-religious" and "prayerlike".

Liszt later re-used the Consolation's theme in the Andante sostenuto / quasi adagio section of his Piano Sonata in B Minor.

=== Consolation No. 5 ===
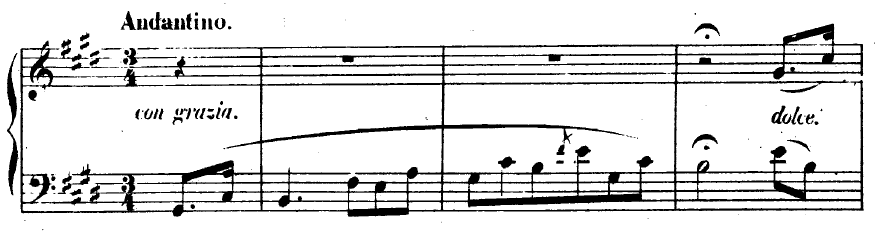
Consolation No. 5, first few bars

Consolation No. 5, Andantino
Performed by Constantin Stephan

Consolation No. 5 is in E major. It is initially marked Andantino. The Consolation has a cantilena vocal style. This Consolation has the oldest genealogy having been reworked from the "Madrigal" of the earlier fifth version of the Consolations. Compared to the earlier Madrigal, this Consolation:

- is shorter, having 56 measures compared to the Madrigal's 69;
- shares several sections with similar melodies;
- employs simpler harmonies;
- and is rhythmically less rigid.

=== Consolation No. 6 ===
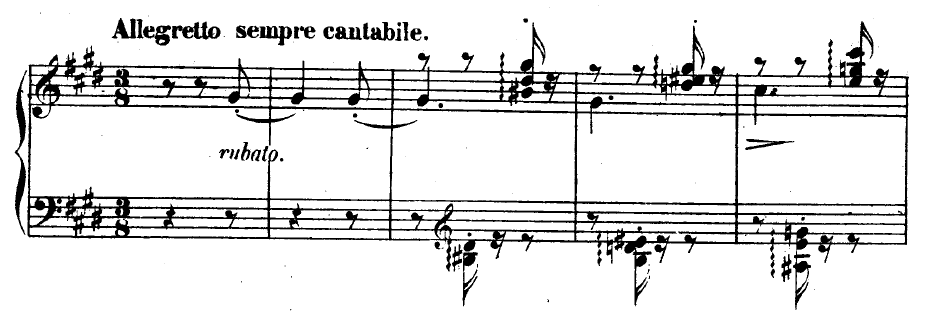
Consolation No. 6, first few bars

The sixth and final Consolation is in E major. It is initially marked Allegretto sempre cantabile and is the longest of the Consolations with a total of 100 measures. It is the most technically demanding of the Consolations. The piece has been described by Carl Lachmund, one of Liszt's students, as more characteristic of Liszt's style than the more renowned D♭ major third Consolation. Lachmund provides insight into the style in which Liszt played the Consolation, stating:

He [Liszt] played each note of the melody as if it were a significant poetic word, which effect was heightened in that he used the thumb for each one of these notes, and dropping his hand in a languid manner as he did this. He would dwell slightly here or there on a note as if entranced and then resume the motion without leaving a feeling that the time had been disturbed. I do not recall the particular measures in which he did this; but even then I felt that he might do it in a different place each time he played the piece.

== In popular culture ==
Consolation No. 3 is heard in the films Magnificent Obsession (1954) and A Man Called Otto (2022). It is also used in the films All That Heaven Allows (1955) and Norman Davies’s Of Time and the City (2008).
