= Nocturne in C minor, Op. posth. (Chopin) =

Musical work by Frédéric Chopin

Nocturne in C minor
- by Frédéric Chopin
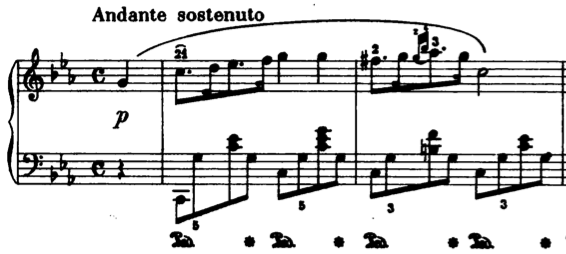
- Opening bars
- Key: C minor
- Catalogue: Brown index: B. 108; Chopin National Edition: WN 62; Krystyna Kobylańska: KK IVb/8; Chomiński: P. 2/8
- Style: Romantic music Nocturne
- Movements: One

Recording by Diana Hughes (Musopen).

Frédéric Chopin's Nocturne No. 21 in C minor is a musical work for solo piano composed in 1847–1848 or 1837. It was the last of Chopin's nocturnes to be published, and was done so posthumously in 1938. It is famous for its striking simplicity and folk-like melody.

The date of composition is uncertain: in the first publication in 1938, Ludwik Bronarski claimed that this piece may be one of the earliest of Chopin's known nocturnes, written before he left Poland; nonetheless, it has traits of the composer's late period. The fact that the two manuscripts of the piece came from the Rothschilds, and the manuscript paper was mostly used by Chopin in 1845–46 (as pointed out by Arthur Hedley), suggests that it was composed late in the composer's life.
