= Ludwik Bronarski =

Polish musicologist

Ludwik Bronarski (1890–1975) was a Polish musicologist. Born in Lvov, he studied musicology at the University of Vienna and devoted his life to interpreting the works of Chopin.
