= Nocturnes, Op. 27 (Chopin) =

Two nocturnes composed by Frederic Chopin

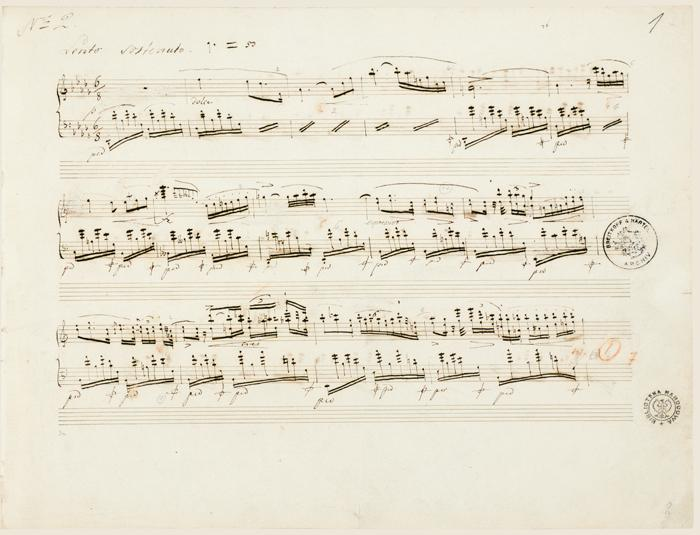
Manuscript to Nocturne Op. 27, No. 2

The Nocturnes, Op. 27 are a set of two nocturnes for solo piano composed by Frédéric Chopin. The pieces were composed in 1836 and published in 1837. Both nocturnes in this opus are dedicated to Countess d'Appony.

This publication marked the transition from triplets of nocturnes to contrasting pairs. Whereas the Nocturnes, Op. 9 and Op. 15 included three nocturnes each, the remainder of Chopin's nocturnes published during his lifetime were in sets of two.

David Dubal feels that the pieces are "more aptly described as ballades in miniature". Blair Johnson states that these two nocturnes are "two of the most powerful—and famous—nocturnes [Chopin] has ever penned" and that these nocturnes are "virtually unrecognizable" to the nocturne tradition of John Field.

== Pieces ==
=== No. 1 in C♯ minor ===
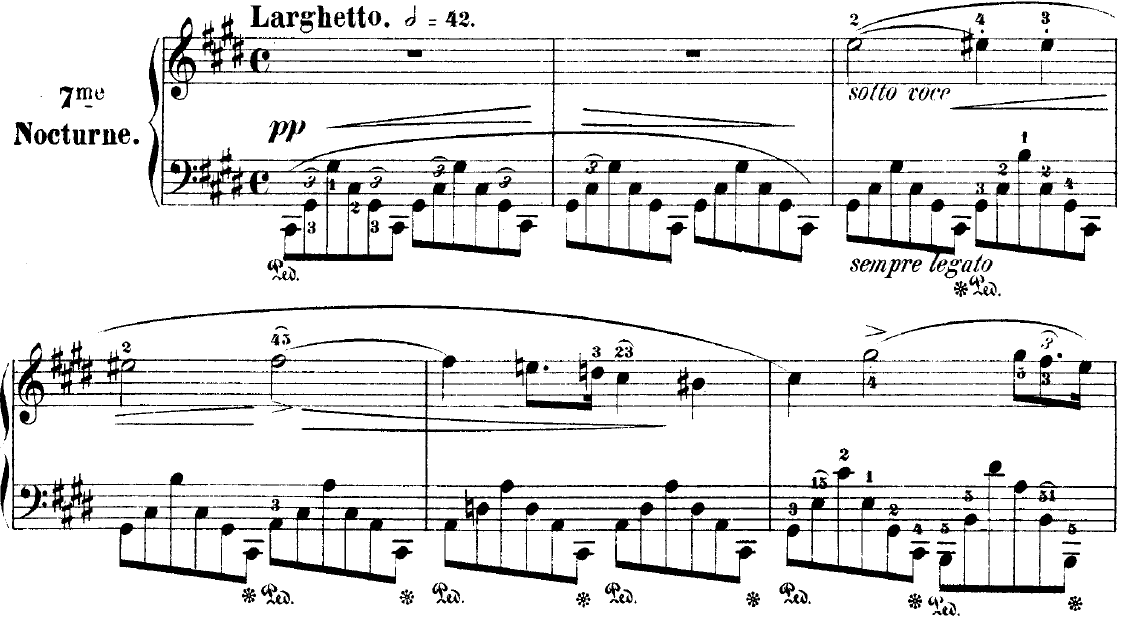
The opening bars of No. 1 in C♯ minor

The Nocturne in C♯ minor, referred to as Nocturne No. 7 in the context of the complete set of Chopin's Nocturnes, is initially marked larghetto and is in 4/4 meter, written as common time. It transitions to più mosso (more movement) in measure 29, along with a time signature change to 3/4 meter. The piece returns to its original tempo and meter in measure 84, and ends in an adagio beginning in measure 99. The piece is 101 measures long and written in ternary form with coda; the primary theme is introduced, followed by a secondary theme and a repetition of the first.

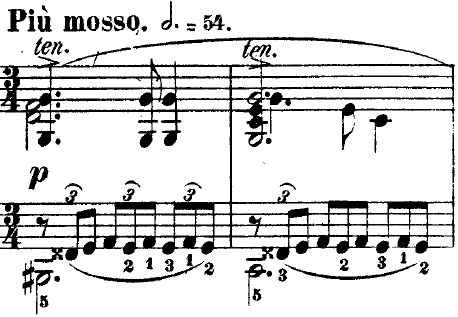
The second theme of No. 1 in C♯ minor

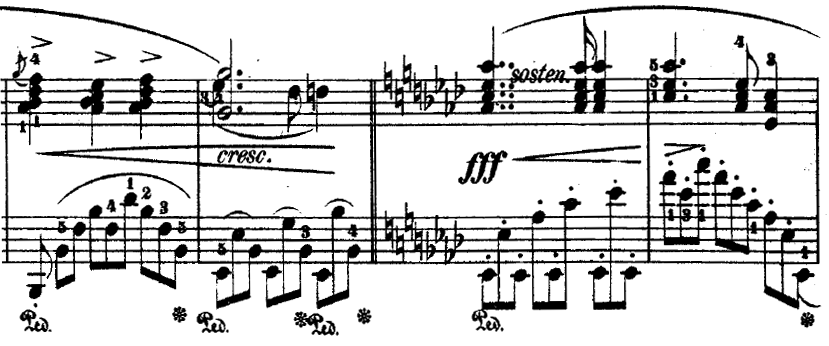
Modulation to A♭ major

The opening alternates between major and minor and uses wide arpeggios, commonly found in other nocturnes as well, in the left hand; such arpeggios require a wide left hand to play smoothly. James Huneker commented that the piece is "a masterpiece", pointing to the "morbid, persistent melody" of the left hand. The più mosso uses mostly triplets in the left-hand and modulates to A♭ major in measure 49. It ends with a cadenza before transitioning back to the primary theme. For David Dubal, the più mosso has a "restless, vehement power". Huneker also likens the più mosso to a work by Beethoven due to the agitated nature of this section. The coda "reminds the listener of Chopin's seemingly inexhaustible prodigality" according to Dubal while Huneker calls it a "surprising climax followed by sunshine" before returning to the opening theme.

The first duet of the ballet In the Night by Jerome Robbins (1970) was choreographed to this piece.

=== No. 2 in D♭ major ===
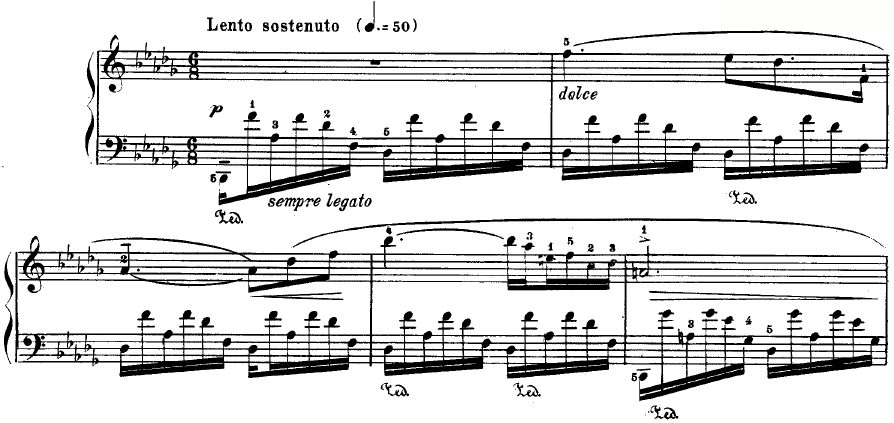
The opening bars

The Nocturne in D♭ major, referred to as Nocturne No. 8 in the context of the complete set of Chopin's Nocturnes, is one of Chopin's more popular compositions. It is initially marked as lento sostenuto and is in 6/8 meter. It consists of two strophes, repeated in increasingly complex variations. The piece is 77 measures long.

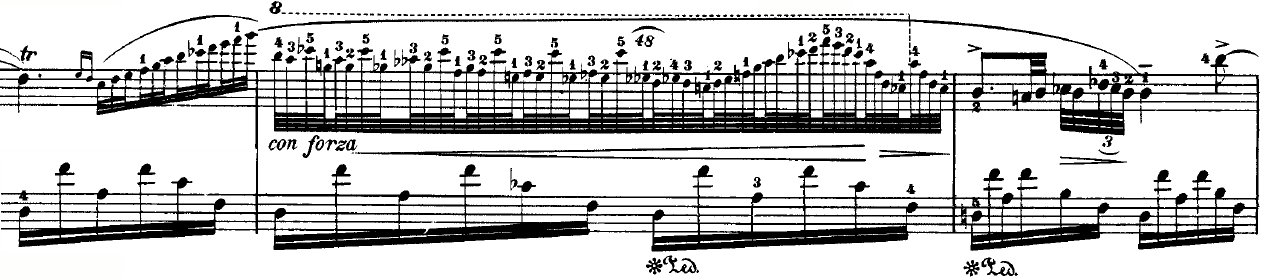
Some of the highly intricate ornamentation in No. 2

Blair Johnston calls the main cadence, near the end of the piece, "one of the most glorious moments in Chopin's entire output". Johnston also calls the piece "one of [Chopin's] most graceful essays in fioritura ornamental practices". Huneker states that the piece "really contains but one subject, and is a song of the sweet summer of two souls, for there is obviously meaning in the duality of voices." The piece contains a harmony of broken chords which is played with the left hand, a habit Chopin had when composing his nocturnes, while the right hand plays the main melody, often with the addition of a second voice. Various sections consisting of grace notes and polyrhythms add to the delicate and somewhat melancholic mood that the piece conveys.

The work heavily influenced Franz Liszt, particularly in his Consolation No. 3 in D-flat major. The similarity between the two works including their shared key, lyrical cantabile melodies, flowing accompaniment, and expressive ornamentation has often been interpreted as a tribute to Chopin who died in 1849, one year before the Consolations were published. The Third Consolation is one of several works in which Liszt adopted a style strongly reminiscent of Chopin’s music; other examples include Liszt’s Polonaises, Berceuse, Mazurka brillante, and Ballades.

The piece has occasionally been featured in popular culture, such as in the 1977 film The Spy Who Loved Me, the 1998 Russian film The Barber of Siberia, and the webcomic Saturday Morning Breakfast Cereal.
