= Jean-Jacques Eigeldinger =

Swiss musicologist

Jean-Jacques Eigeldinger (born 9 March 1940) is a Swiss musicologist. He became known through his activities as a juror and publications on Chopin.

== Life ==
Born in Neuchâtel, Eigeldinger studied at the University of Neuchâtel, the Sorbonne and the Conservatoire de Musique de Genève.

From 1976 to 1981 he taught at the Jacques-Dalcroze Institute in Geneva and from 1978 to 1983 at the Conservatoire de musique de Genève. He also taught as a guest lecturer at the École normale supérieure in Paris and at the Université Laval in Quebec City. He is a retired professor at the University of Geneva, where he has worked since 1981. He was one of the founders of the Swiss Musicological Society and long-serving editor-in-chief of the Revue musicale in Romansh-speaking Switzerland.

In 1984 Eigeldinger received the Order of Merit of the Polish Minister of Culture. In 2001 the International Chopin Foundation awarded him the Chopin Prize. He was also a juror of the International Chopin Piano Competition.

Eigeldinger's teaching interests focus on the history of esthetics and interpretation of the 18th and 19th centuries music. His numerous works on Chopin include studies on Chopin's compositions and stylistic devices (Préludes) and contributions to the composer's biography. Eigeldinger is also the editor of texts dealing with Chopin's work as a piano teacher.

In 1993 Eigeldinger published Chopin's sketches for a piano teaching method. In his book Chopin vu par ses élèves (1970), which contains the first complete English translation of the Entwurfs einer Methode, he collected extensive material from Chopin's students and sources from Chopin himself on the piano playing technique and the interpretation of his music.

Together with John Rink and Jim Samson, Eigeldinger is preparing a new critical edition of Chopin's entire oeuvre.

In September 2001 he was appointed to the program committee of the Warsaw Fryderyk Chopin Institute.

== Publications ==
- Chopin vu par ses élèves, Neuchâtel: La Baconniére, 1970; revised new edition Paris: Fayard, 2006, ISBN 2-213-62916-1 – English translation under the title Chopin: pianist and teacher – as seen by his pupils, Cambridge: Cambridge University Press, 1986, ISBN 0-521-24159-6
- Solange Clésinger, Frédéric Chopin. Souvenir inédits, published by Jean-Jacques Eigeldinger, in: Revue musicale de Suisse romande, Jg. 31 (1978), p. 224–238
- L'univers musical de Chopin, Paris: Fayard, 2000, ISBN 2-213-60751-6
- Chopin et Pleyel, Paris: Fayard, 2010, ISBN 978-2-213-61922-4
- Chopin, âme des salons parisiens: 1830–1848, Paris: Fayard, 2013, ISBN 978-2-213-67243-4
- Jean-Joseph-Bonaventure Laurens et ses pèlerinages musicaux en Allemagne 1841–1853, in: Musique, Images, Instruments. Revue française d’organologie et d’iconographie musicale, Jg. 16 (2016), p. 11–54

== Bibliography ==
- La note bleue: mélanges offerts au professeur Jean-Jacques Eigeldinger, publisher Jacqueline Waeber, Bern: Lang, 2006, ISBN 3-03-910771-2
- Chopin improvisateur. Un aspect méconnu, Lecture given by Jean-Jacques Eigeldinger on October 17, 2017 at Club 44 (La Chaux-de-Fonds) available online.
