= Jean-Racine Meissonnier =

French music publisher, composer and guitarist

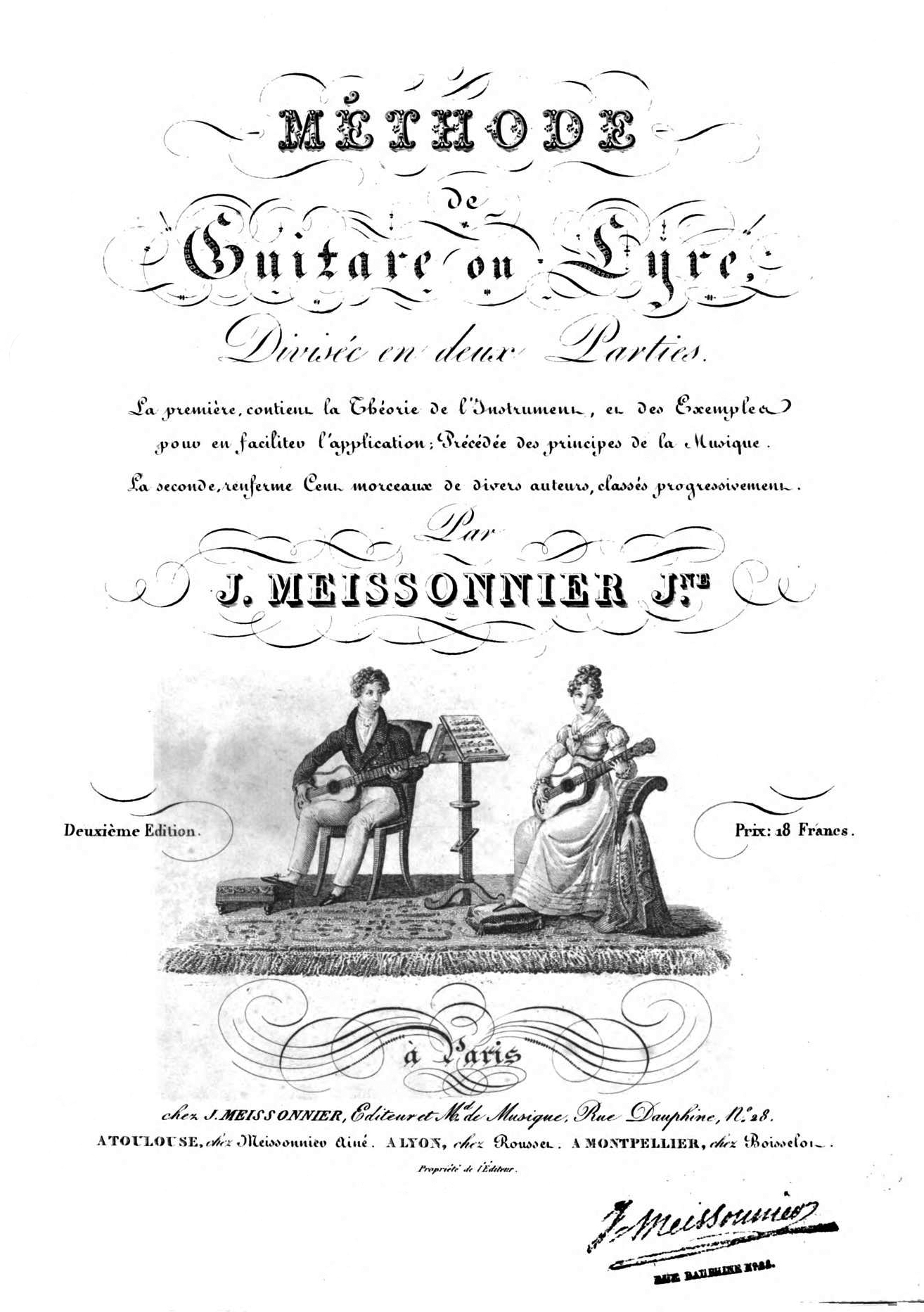
Cover page of the guitar method published in 1820 by J. Meissonnier

Jean-Racine Meissonnier (1794 – 19 August 1856), also called Meissonnier Jeune, was a French classical guitarist, musical arranger and composer, as well as an important music publisher.

== Life ==
Born in Marseille, Meissonnier learned the guitar from his elder brother, Jean-Antoine Meissonnier (1783–1857), himself a guitarist and publisher. After he moved to the capital, he taught the instrument for a long time, before taking over the business of a music merchant, Corbaux, at 28 rue Dauphine in Paris.

He arranged many pieces, especially opera pieces, for the guitar. He also composed arias that have become classics, some of which have been published: Three Duets for guitar and violin; Three Rondeaux; Airs connus pour guitare seule, Opp. 2 and 4; Airs d'opéra variés; Contredanses. He also wrote two guitar methods.

Meissonnier invested a lot in his publishing activity, like his brother for whom he is sometimes mistaken (Fétis notes that Whistling confuses them in his general catalogue of printed music). From 1821 onwards, he was found in Paris (rue Dauphine) under the name "J. Meissonnier" until 1840, then as "Meissonnier Jeune" from 1841 to 1845, then "J. Meissonnier et fils" or "J. Meissonnier fils" from 1845 to 1860 (his son Édouard having entered the business and "made a considerable fortune" there according to Fétis.) In 1860, the Meissonnier estate was transferred to the publisher E. Gérard et C^{ie}.

== Works ==
=== Books ===
- J. Meissonnier (1830). Méthode de guitare ou lyre (in French). Paris: J. Meissonnier. p. 99.
- J. Meissonnier (1860). Méthode complète pour la guitare, contenant cent morceaux choisis et classés progressivement (in French). Bordeaux: Philibert.

=== Arrangements (online) ===
- Amédé[e] de Beauplan (text), Meissonnier jeune (guitar arrangement) (1820). Dormez donc mes chères amours. Romance à une ou deux voix (in French). Paris: S. Gaveaux. p. 3.
- Amédé[e] de Beauplan (text), Gluck (music), Berton fils (voice arrangement), Meissonnier jeune (guitar arrangement) (1820). L'Anglaise en diligence (in French). Paris: J. Meissonnier. p. 2.
- Sylvain Blot (text), Édouard Bruguière (music), Meissonnier jeune (guitar arrangement) (1820). L'ami Charlot (in French). Lyon: Arnaud. p. 3.
- Paulin Saint-Elme Champ (text), Édouard Bruguière (music), Meissonnier jeune (guitar arrangement) (1820). Adieux d'Isaure à la brigantine : romance (in French). Paris: J. Meissonnier. p. 3.
- Antoine Romagnesi (music), Meissonnier jeune (guitar arrangement) (1820). L'amante aveugle : romance (in French). Paris: Meissonnier Jeune. p. 3.
- Antoine Romagnesi (music), Meissonnier jeune (guitar arrangement) (1820). Duo, tiré d'un opéra inédit (in French). Paris: Bressler. p. 2.
- M. Millevoye (text), Georges-Joseph-Laurent Lambert (music), Meissonnier jeune (guitar arrangement) (1820). L'amour vrai : romance (in French). Paris: S. Gaveaux. p. 2.
- Eugène Scribe et Melesville (text), Daniel-François-Esprit Auber (music), Meissonnier jeune (guitar arrangement) (1825). Concert à la Cour. One-act (Opéra comique). Includes: N°2. Comme il me lançait une œillade (2 p. n. ch.) – N°5. Le charlatan (4 p.) (in French). Paris: Frère. p. 4.
- Joseph Meissonnier. Andante Affettuoso (PDF) (in French). Archived from the original (PDF) on 2017-02-27.

=== Arrangements (others) ===
- Trois Duos, for guitar and violin (Paris: Hanry)
- Trois Rondeaux (Paris: Hanry)
- Airs connus pour guitare seule, Opp. 2 and 4 (Paris: Ph. Petit)
- Airs d'opéra variés (Paris: Hanry, Dufaut et Dubois)
- Contredanses (Paris: Hanry, Dufaut et Dubois)
