= Nocturnes, Op. 32 (Chopin) =

Nocturnes composed by Frédéric Chopin

The Nocturnes, Op. 32 is a set of two nocturnes for solo piano written and published by Frédéric Chopin in 1837. The nocturnes are dedicated to Madame Camile de Billing, and were his ninth and tenth nocturnes published.

== Pieces ==
=== No. 1 in B major ===
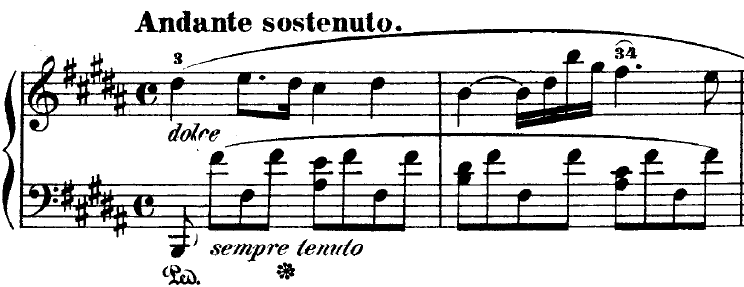
Opening bars of No. 1 in B major.

Nocturne op 32 no 1 in B major
Performed by Constantin Stephan

The nocturne in B major is initially marked andante sostenuto and is in 4/4 meter. There are several ritardando markings throughout, followed by a tempo marking in the next measure, such as in measure 7, 8, 17 and 18. The piece transitions to adagio in the last two measures, starting in measure 64. The piece is 65 measures long and, unusually, ends in the tonic minor key, B minor, although some editions (such as those by Rafael Joseffy as well as Chopin's student Carl Mikuli) and performances (such as that by Arthur Rubinstein) end with a B major chord, which has the effect of a Picardy third in the context of the minor-mode coda. There has also been confusion over a key in the first bar of the last line: Theodor Kullak and Karl Klindworth use a G, while Julian Fontana used an F♯.

David Dubal found the nocturne to be "of less importance, though characteristic in design and melodic contour." He also states the coda "completely shocks the listener out of reverie." According to Berkeley, the ending "defies analysis, but compels acceptance." Jim Samson states that "The interruption of the song by this startling passage of instrumental recitative submits to no formal logic, but rather brings directly into the foreground Chopin's desire to make the music 'speak'." The ending was both "dramatic and original" to James Friskin, in comparison to the simplicity of the rest of the piece.

=== No. 2 in A♭ major ===
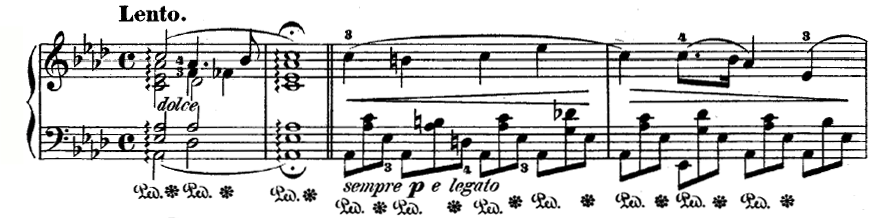
Opening bars of No. 2 in A♭ major.

The nocturne in A♭ major is initially marked as lento and in 4/4 meter. It is structured in an A–B–B′–A′ format and features a melodic and bright main melodic theme in the A section, with a turbulent and dramatic theme in the B sections. In measure 27, the A section transitions into the B section, as the meter switches to 12/8 and the key to F minor (the relative minor of A♭ major). This initial transition is performed over a C dominant seventh chord, which is not totally foreign to A♭ and yet pushes strongly away towards the F minor B section. James Huneker found the F-minor section to "[broaden] out to dramatic reaches" though he still viewed the overall piece negatively. After a tumultuous set of chromatically descending octaves at the end of the B section, the key changes to F♯ minor in measure 39 and returns to A♭ major at measure 51, where the meter also returns to 4/4. The tempo returns to lento in measure 73. The piece has a total of 74 measures and is in ternary form.

Though he thought the piece contained a "long, gracious melody with a balletic middle section," Dubal found the nocturne to be "less important than other members of this species" like the Nocturne in B major. Blair Johnson found that "like the previous nocturne, simplicity of gesture is of the utmost importance throughout the opening section". However, it differs due to the "stormier, more chromatic middle section". The repetition of the beginning has been "infected by the agitated atmosphere of the nocturne's center," and causes "the reprise some time to recapture the gentleness that is its rightful tone," according to Johnson. Friskin found that "the middle section offers good practice in the maintenance of a melodic line in the outer fingers while playing supporting chords in the same hand."

The nocturne is among the works of Chopin orchestrated in the ballet Les Sylphides.

== Reception ==
To some, these nocturnes are not as impressive as their predecessors, the Nocturnes, Op. 27. While each piece "exemplifies one of the composer's various approaches to nocturne form," Blair Johnson felt that, in the piece, the "moments of originality and power stick out in a way that they couldn't have, had the entirety of the pieces been sewn of finer silk." James Huneker also found this set "a little tiresome".

Gustav Barth commented that Chopin's nocturnes show definite signs of "progress" in comparison to John Field's original nocturnes, though the improvements are "for the most part only in technique." However, David Dubal feels that the pieces are "more aptly described as ballades in miniature."
