= David Dubal =

American musician

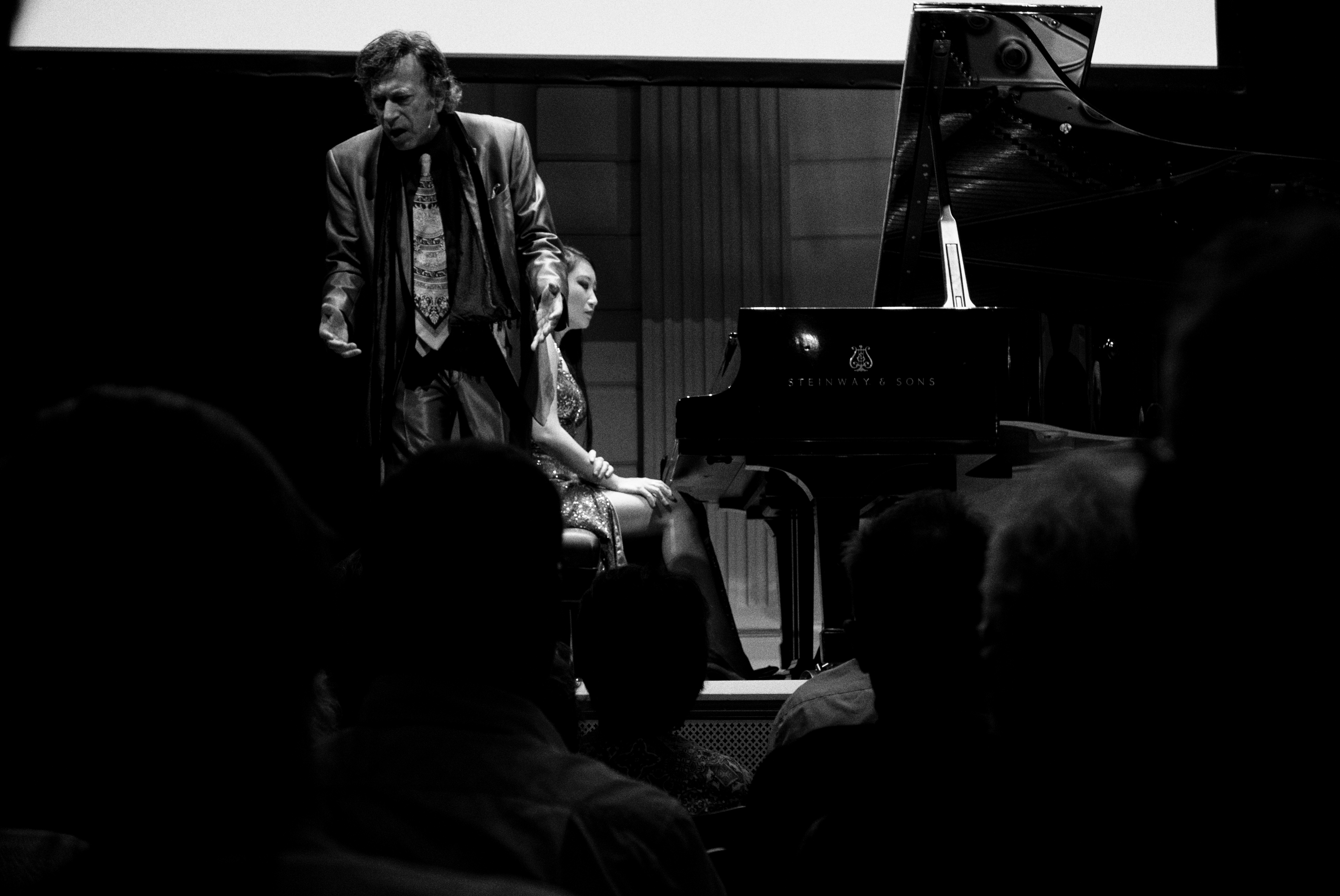
David Dubal at the Concertgebouw, 2017

David Dubal (born Cleveland, Ohio) is an American pianist, teacher, author, lecturer, broadcaster, and painter.

== Musician and painter ==
Dubal has given piano recitals and master classes worldwide, and has also judged international piano competitions (including the Van Cliburn International Piano Competition). He recorded several albums jointly with pianist Stanley Waldoff for the Musical Heritage Society, and four compact discs of these recordings have been released on the ArkivCD label. (His album of Aram Khachaturian solo piano works has never been given a compact disc release, although it has been archived at YouTube.) Dubal appeared in the 2013 Dutch film Nostalgia: The Music of Wim Statius Muller, commenting on the musical compositions of Wim Statius Muller, who was Dubal's teacher at Ohio State University. Dubal taught at the Juilliard School from 1983 to 2018, and at the Manhattan School of Music from 1994 until 2015.

Dubal's drawings and paintings have garnered attention and praise. In 2020, a book titled Selected Paintings and Drawings of David Dubal was published by TIMP Universal, New York.

== Author ==
Dubal has written several books, including The Art of the Piano, Evenings with Horowitz, Conversations with Menuhin, Reflections from the Keyboard, Conversations with Joao Carlos Martins, The Essential Canon of Classical Music (an encyclopedic guide to the prominent composers of the Western canon), and Remembering Horowitz (with 125 essays by accomplished pianists and a disc of Vladimir Horowitz and Dubal in conversation). He also wrote and hosted The Golden Age of the Piano, an Emmy Award-winning documentary produced by Peter Rosen. Several of his articles on music have appeared in The Wall Street Journal, and The New Criterion.

== Lecturer ==
Dubal is currently the host and instructor of the weekly Piano Evenings with David Dubal series, held at Good Shepherd-Faith Presbyterian Church in New York City. Dubal "provides historical and musical context for each week's repertoire selections, performed by a rotating lineup of acclaimed pianists."

Dubal has lectured numerous times at New York's Metropolitan Museum of Art since the 1980s, to include lectures on Beethoven, a 200th birthday lecture on Frederic Chopin and Robert Schumann in 2010, three lectures in 2011 on Russian Romantic composers, and four lectures in 2012 on La Belle Époque. He gave three lectures (on Chopin, Liszt, and the history of the piano) at the 1993 Van Cliburn International Piano Competition. Dubal has given interviews on the subjects of the great pianists, music history and tradition, and the century of social change to the Snapshots Music and Arts Foundation, and these interviews are available to hear at their website.

== Current and recent broadcasting activity ==
Dubal is the host of The Piano Matters, a program of comparative piano performances that can be heard on WWFM and other US radio stations. He also hosts Reflections from the Keyboard, a weekly exploration of piano recordings, heard on WQXR-FM.

Dubal co-hosts with Jack Kohl a series of conversations between them, the episodes of which can be accessed at YouTube and Substack.

In the late 1990s, Dubal hosted a series of radio programs titled The American Century, focusing on musical works of the 20th century written by American composers. Many episodes of this series have been archived at YouTube.

== Music director of WNCN-FM ==
From 1971 to 1994, Dubal served as music director of New York City classical music radio station WNCN-FM. In 1975 and 1976, he hosted a regular program of comparative performances titled A Musical Offering, focusing on the piano music of Bach, Beethoven, Brahms, Chopin, and Liszt, and more than a hundred of these programs have been archived at YouTube. In 1980, his series of interviews with Vladimir Horowitz, Conversations with Horowitz, was awarded a George Foster Peabody Award.

In the early 1980s, Dubal interviewed Claudio Arrau for a series titled Conversations with Arrau consisting of six programs on the great pianist's life and career. In 1985, he interviewed Yehudi Menuhin at the WNCN-FM studios; much of this conversation was used in the book Conversations with Menuhin. Dubal also hosted a series of WNCN-FM programs titled For the Love of Music, in which he interviewed pianists, including Murray Perahia, Mitsuko Uchida, and Alexis Weissenberg, composers, including John Corigliano, Phillip Ramey, William Mayer and Laurent Petitgirard, and other prominent people in the arts, including Quentin Crisp, Shlomo Mintz, and Wanda Wiłkomirska. More than a hundred of these interviews have been archived at YouTube.

== Honors ==
Dubal was honored by composer Virgil Thomson with a musical portrait titled "David Dubal: In Flight"; it has been recorded by pianist Jacquelyn Helin, pianist Craig Rutenberg, and a version orchestrated by Thomson was also recorded. An analysis of "David Dubal: In Flight" can be found in Anthony Tommasini's book Virgil Thomson's Musical Portraits. In 1986, Dubal was recognized for his work at WNCN-FM with an ASCAP Deems Taylor Award for broadcasting. In 2006, he was awarded an honorary Doctor of Music degree from the State University of New York.
