= Nocturnes, Op. 62 (Chopin) =

1846 compositions by Frédéric Chopin

Nocturne in B major, Op. 62/1

Nocturne in E major, Op. 62/2

Written between 1845 and 1846, Nocturnes Op. 62 are a set of two nocturnes for solo piano by Frédéric Chopin. They were published in 1846 and are dedicated to Mademoiselle R[osa] de Konneritz (daughter of Hans Heinrich von Könneritz, the ambassador of Saxony in Paris). These were Chopin's final compositions in the genre, although they were not the last to be published.

== Pieces ==
=== No. 1 in B major ===
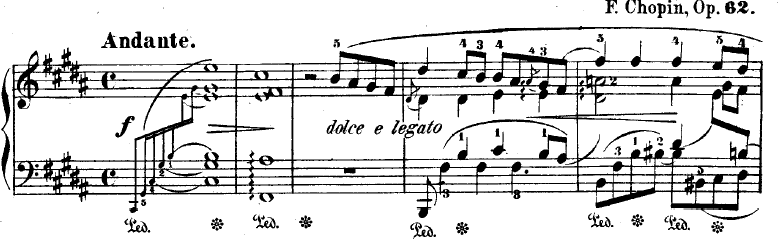
Opening bars of Op. 62/1

The Nocturne in B major opens with two introductory chords. After a pause, a melody in B major emerges. At first, the action proceeds gently and smoothly (dolce, legato). The piece soon turns into declamation, led by a voice in the upper register, and after a rapid scale in the right hand, there is a quick reprise of the main theme. Then, the B section of this ternary formed (A–B–A) piece begins.

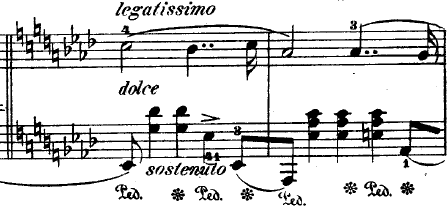
Secondary theme

The middle section, in the distant key of A♭ major, is marked sostenuto and legatissimo. Though it begins softly, it can also be described as inhibited, showing unease, triggered by the play of syncopation of the left-hand chords. Chopin ends this section with harmonic subtlety and delicacy.

The main section of the nocturne returns, in the home key of B major. Furthermore, the opening melody is embellished by continuous figuration including many trills, grace notes and runs. The main theme ends with a resolution in B major, in a particularly long coda. The coda ends with a simple and peaceful harmonic phrase. The recurring harmonies from the introductory chord alternate with the tonic B major chord before concluding as an I–V–I cadence.

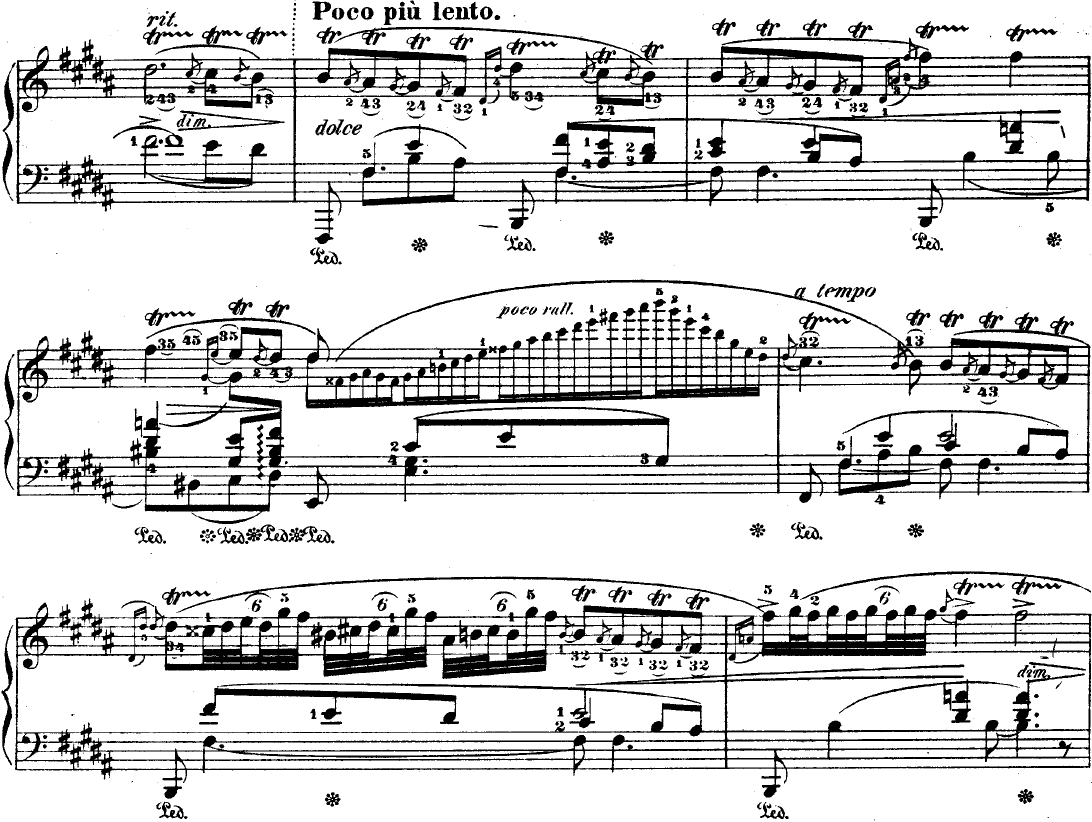
Rich embellishment in the return to the main theme

The embellishment upon the return of the main theme has often been compared to an Italian da capo aria in Italian bel canto style. In the English-speaking world, the B major nocturne is named the ‘Tuberose’, an exotic greenhouse flower. James Huneker explains the reason: "the chief tune has charm, a fruity charm’, and its return in the reprise ‘is faint with a sick, rich odor".

=== No. 2 in E major ===
The Nocturne in E major is another reflective and contrapuntally engaging piece. The nocturne's thematic structure (A–B–C–A–B) consists of a slow primary theme in E major, followed by a more quickly moving secondary melodic theme with climbing bass runs. This leads to the agitated and contrapuntal third section in C♯ minor, which has melodic interplay between the left and the right hand top three fingers, with the right thumb and first fingers largely playing accompaniment. A dissonant arpeggio ushers in the reprise of the first theme. This then gives way to the rolling bass a second time, which leads into the coda. In their reprisal, these two melodic themes are accompanied by slightly differing harmonies with modified embellishment in the right hand. The nocturne ends with a coda reaffirming the tonic key. This was the very last nocturne that Chopin composed in his lifetime, although three more were published posthumously.

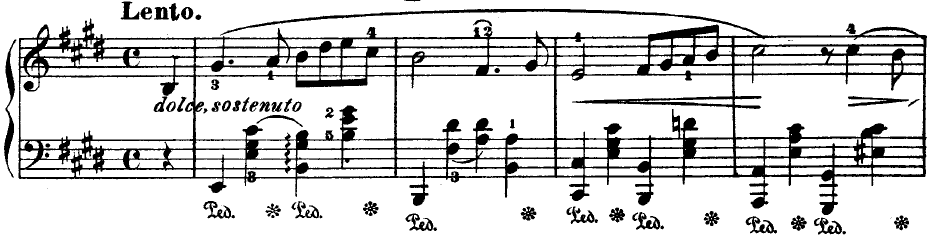
Opening bars of Op. 62/2

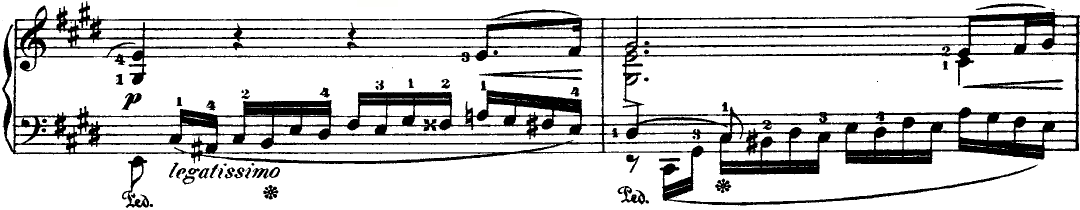
Secondary melody in Op. 62/2

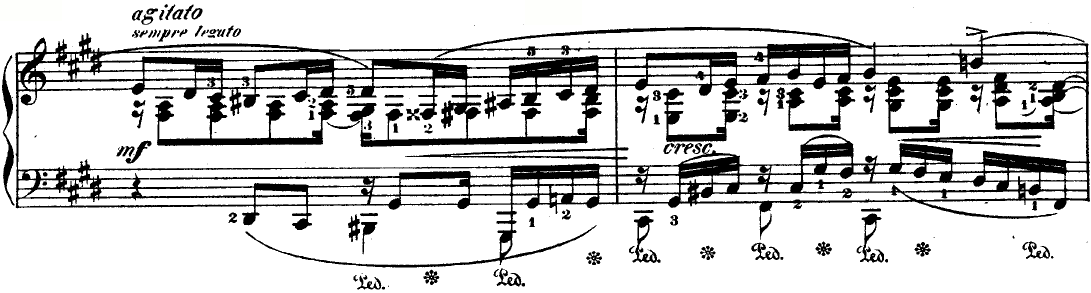
Agitato third theme of Op. 62/2

== Reception ==
Upon publication, these nocturnes were not held in high regard. Many critics dismissed the pieces, often claiming that they were the products of a disease-weakened composer. By the twentieth century, the consensus had become much more positive. The pieces are widely performed today and are considered among Chopin's most refined works. Critics maintain that the pieces display Chopin's late compositional style, which is characterized by masterful use of counterpoint and new explorations in harmony and musical structure. In reference to these works, Blair Johnston states "Two such intimately expressive works as these (one is almost willing to assert that such musical privacy has no place in a public concert hall) have rarely found their way onto paper."
