= Nocturnes, Op. 15 (Chopin) =

Piano compositions by Frédéric Chopin

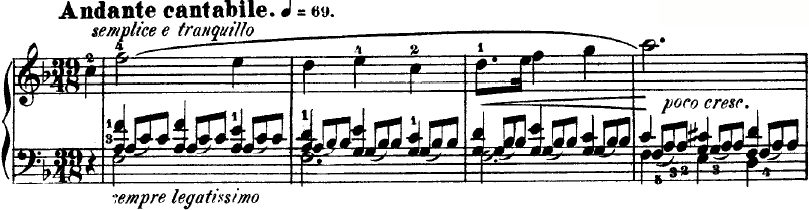
The opening bars of No. 1 in F major

The Nocturnes, Op. 15 are a set of three nocturnes for solo piano written by Frédéric Chopin between 1830 and 1833. The work was published in January 1834, and was dedicated to Ferdinand Hiller. These nocturnes display a more personal approach to the nocturne form than that of the earlier Opus 9. The melodies and emotional depth of these nocturnes have thus been thought of as more "Chopinesque."

== Pieces ==
=== No. 1 in F major ===
Chopin's fourth nocturne is in simple ternary form (A–B–A). The first section, in F major, features a very simple melody over a descending triplet pattern in the left hand. The middle section in F minor, in great contrast to the outer themes, is fast and dramatic (Con fuoco) using a challenging double note texture in the right hand. After a return to the serene A theme, the ending does not contain a coda, but rather two simple arpeggios. Some critics have remarked that this nocturne has little to do with night, as if sunlight is "leaking from the piece's seams."

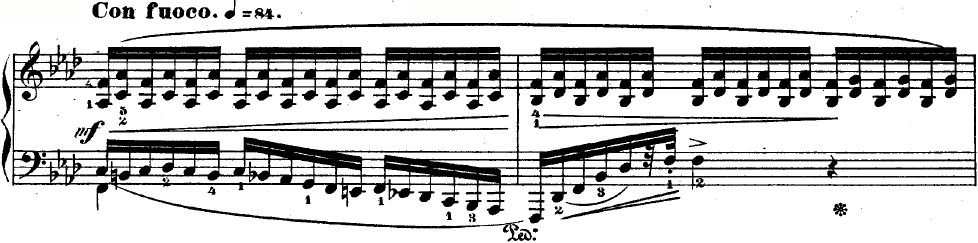
The second theme of No. 1 in F minor.

Nocturne Op. 15 no. 1 in F major
Performed by Luke Faulkner, provided by Musopen

=== No. 2 in F♯ major ===
Nocturne Op. 15 No. 2 in F♯ major
Performed by Vadim Chaimovich, provided by Musopen (4:04)

Chopin's fifth nocturne is in A–B–A form, in 2/4 time. The first section, marked Larghetto, features an intricate, elaborately ornamental melody over an even quaver bass. The second section, labeled doppio movimento (double speed), resembles a scherzo with dotted quaver-semiquaver melody, semiquavers in a lower voice in the right hand, and large jumps in the bass. The final section is a shortened version of the first (14 bars rather than 24) with characteristic cadenzas and elaboration, finishing with an arpeggio on F♯ major, falling at first, then dying away. Many consider this nocturne to be the best of the opus, stating that its musical maturity matches some of his later nocturnes." Pianist Theodor Kullak remarked about this piece, "The return of the heavenly opening theme... touches [one] like a benediction."

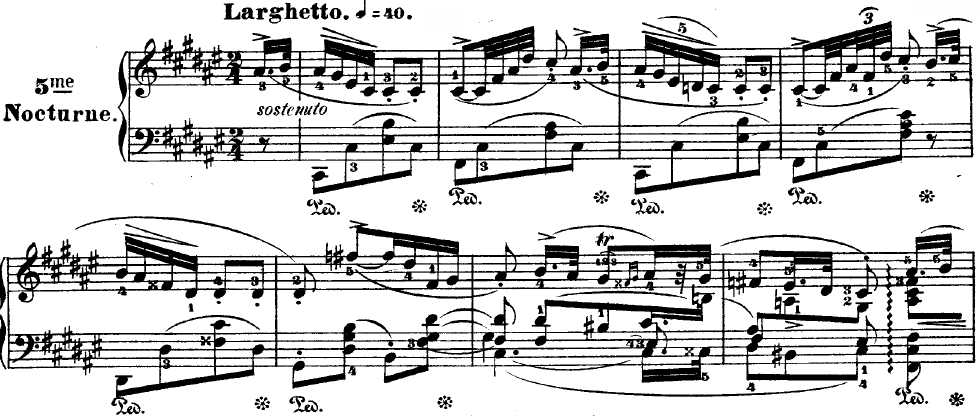
The opening bars of No. 2 in F♯ major

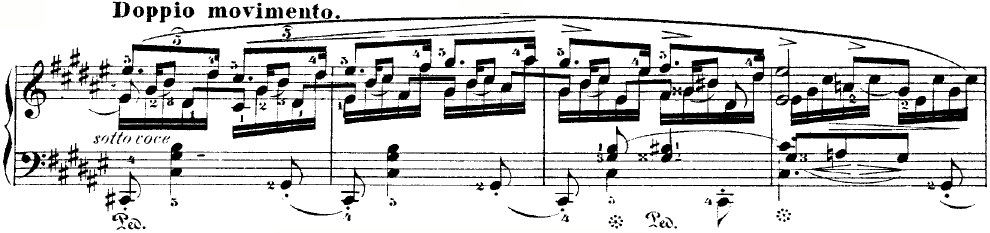
Second theme from No. 2 in F♯ major

=== No. 3 in G minor ===
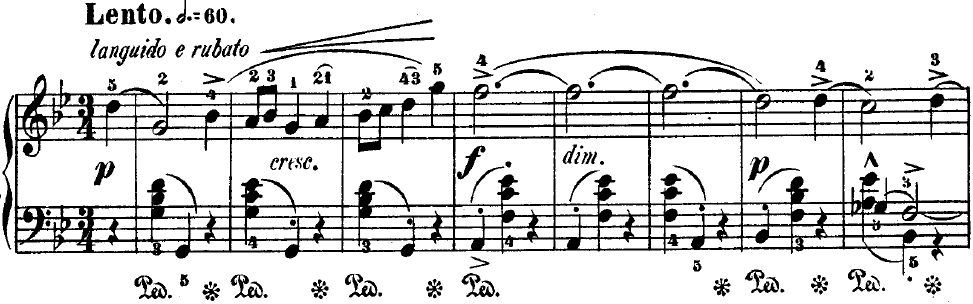
The opening bars of No. 3 in G minor

Chopin's sixth nocturne begins with a slow Lento tempo and is written in 3/4 time. The right-hand part is composed of simple eighth and quarter note patterns, followed by a chromatic rise and fall. The left-hand part maintains quarter note patterns to support the right hand, with pedal marks every six notes. The ending part of the piece is marked Religioso and uses legato chords in the right-hand part.

The piece departs from the usual ternary form in a Chopin nocturne. The concluding section is not only unrelated thematically to the opening one but in a different key (F major). The last four bars return to G minor, though the final chord is major (a Picardy third), as is usual in a Chopin nocturne.

Recording by Olga Gurevich from Musopen.

Chopin originally entitled this nocturne "At the cemetery" when he composed it a day after he attended a performance of Hamlet, but erased the inscription when the piece was to be printed, saying: "Let them figure it out for themselves."
