= Nocturnes, Op. 9 (Chopin) =

1832 set of three solo piano pieces

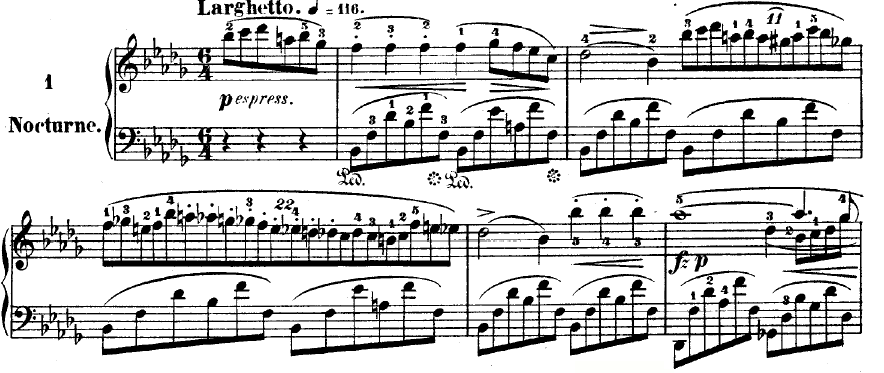
The opening bars and main theme of No. 1

The Nocturnes, Op. 9 are a set of three nocturnes for solo piano written by Frédéric Chopin between 1831 and 1832, published in 1832, and dedicated to Madame Marie Pleyel. These were Chopin's first published set of nocturnes. The second nocturne of the work is often regarded as Chopin's most famous piece.

== Pieces ==
=== No. 1 in B♭ minor ===
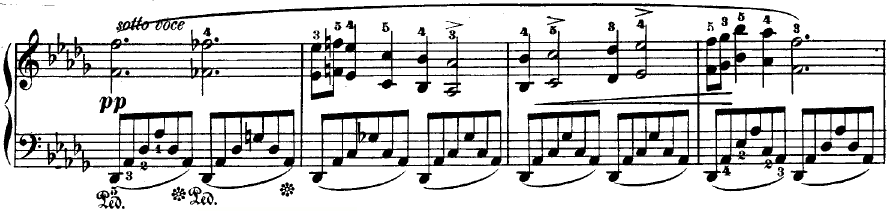
The second theme

Nocturne, Op. 9, No. 1
Florence Robineau

One of the better known nocturnes, this piece has a rhythmic freedom that came to characterize Chopin's later work. The left hand has an unbroken sequence of eighth notes in simple arpeggios throughout the entire piece, while the right hand moves with freedom, occasionally in patterns of seven, eleven, twenty, and twenty-two in the form of polyrhythms. The piece is 85 measures long and in 6/4 meter. It is written in ternary form; after the primary theme, the secondary theme starts in measure 19, followed by a modified version of the primary theme in measure 70.

The opening section moves into a contrasting middle section in the same key signature, which flows back to the opening material in a transitional passage where the melody floats above seventeen consecutive bars of D♭ major chords. The reprise of the first section grows out of this, ending with a Picardy third.

=== No. 2 in E♭ major ===
Nocturne, Op. 9, No. 2
Performed by Martha Goldstein on an 1851 Erard piano.

Chopin composed one of his most well-known nocturnes, Nocturne in E♭ major, Op. 9, No. 2, when he was around twenty years old. This well-known nocturne is in rounded binary form (A, A, B, A, B, A) with coda, C. It is 34 measures long and written in 12/8 meter, having a similar structure to a waltz.

The A and B sections become increasingly ornamented with each recurrence. The penultimate bar utilizes considerable rhythmic freedom, indicated by the instruction, senza tempo (without tempo). The nocturne opens with a legato melody, mostly played piano (quietly), containing graceful upward leaps which becomes increasingly wide as the line unfolds. This melody is heard again three times during the piece. With each repetition, it is varied by ever more elaborate decorative tones and trills. The nocturne also includes a subordinate melody, which is played with rubato.

A sonorous foundation for the melodic line is provided by the widely spaced notes in the accompaniment, connected by the damper pedal. The waltz-like accompaniment gently emphasizes the 12/8 meter, 12 beats to the measure subdivided into four groups of 3 beats each.

Taipei Metro uses the Nocturne in E♭ major, Op. 9, No. 2 as the train melody for arriving trains on the Songshan–Xindian line.

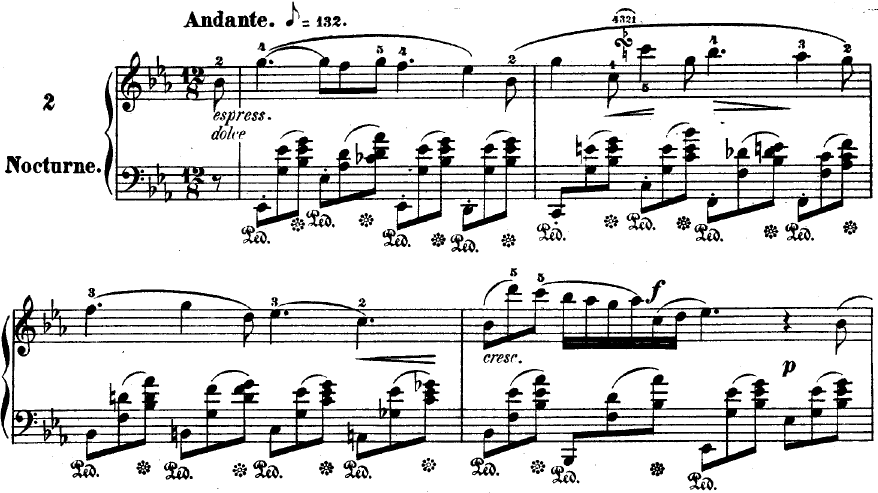
The opening bars and main theme

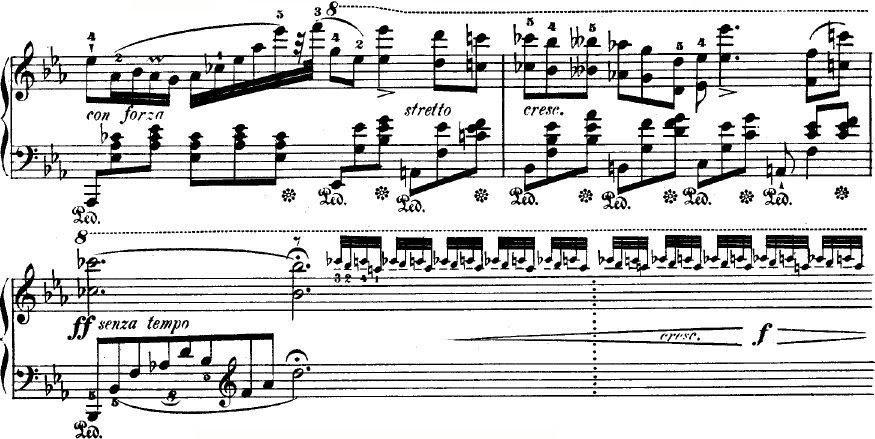
A part of the "C" theme

==== Analysis ====
- John Rink "Structural momentum and closure in Chopin's Nocturne Op 9 No 2" in Schenker Studies 2 (ed. Carl Schachter, Hedi Siegel) pp102–127 Cambridge University Press, 2006 ISBN 0-521-02832-9, ISBN 978-0-521-02832-5.
- Jean-Jacques Eigeldinger "Nocturne op. 9/2, E flat major" in Chopin: pianist and teacher as seen by his pupils (ed. Jean-Jacques Eigeldinger, Roy Howat) pp77–79 Cambridge University Press, 1989 ISBN 0-521-36709-3, ISBN 978-0-521-36709-7.
- Eleanor Bailie "Nocturne No. 2 in E flat major" in Chopin: a graded practical guide (Eleanor Bailie, Issue 3 of The pianist's repertoire) pp303–306 Kahn & Averill, 1998 ISBN 1-871082-67-6, ISBN 978-1-871082-67-8.

=== No. 3 in B major ===
Nocturne, Op. 9, No. 3
Patrizia Prati, Live performance at Museum of Romanticism (Madrid) on 24 November 2015

The piece is in ternary form A–B–A. The first section is marked Allegretto. The main theme is chromatic, but filled with nostalgic energy. The second contrasting section, Agitato in B minor, is a very dramatic one with a combined melody and counter-melody in the right hand and continuous eighth note arpeggios in the left, which requires an amount of virtuosity. The piece is full of coloratura ornaments, and it ends in a small cadenza similar to Opus 9 no. 2, with a wide chord in the left hand accompanied with right hand triplets in a high octave, followed by an arpeggiated ending in B major.

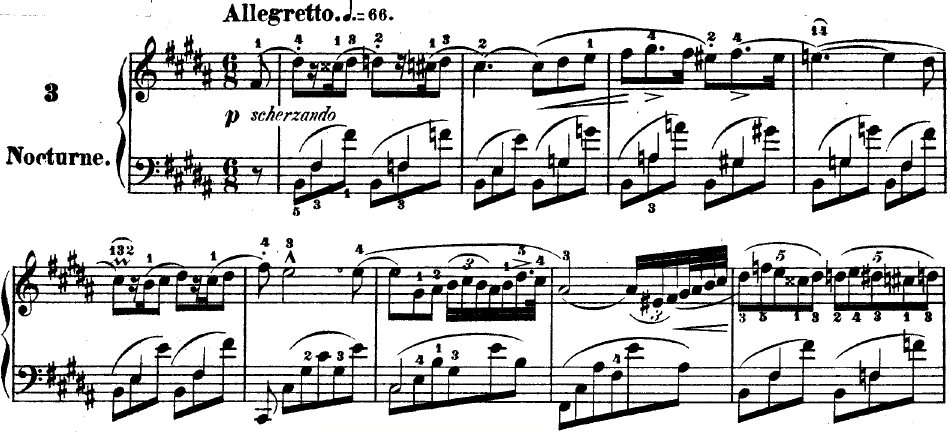
The opening bars of No. 3 in B major

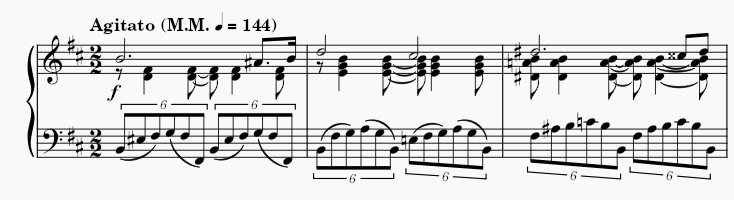
Agitato section of No. 3 in B minor
