= Chopin Year =

Fryderyk Chopin birth commemoration

Chopin Year (Rok Chopinowski in Polish) are celebrations commemorating the birth or death anniversary of Frédéric Chopin in Poland. They took place in 1910, 1949, 1960 and again in 2010.

== 1960 ==
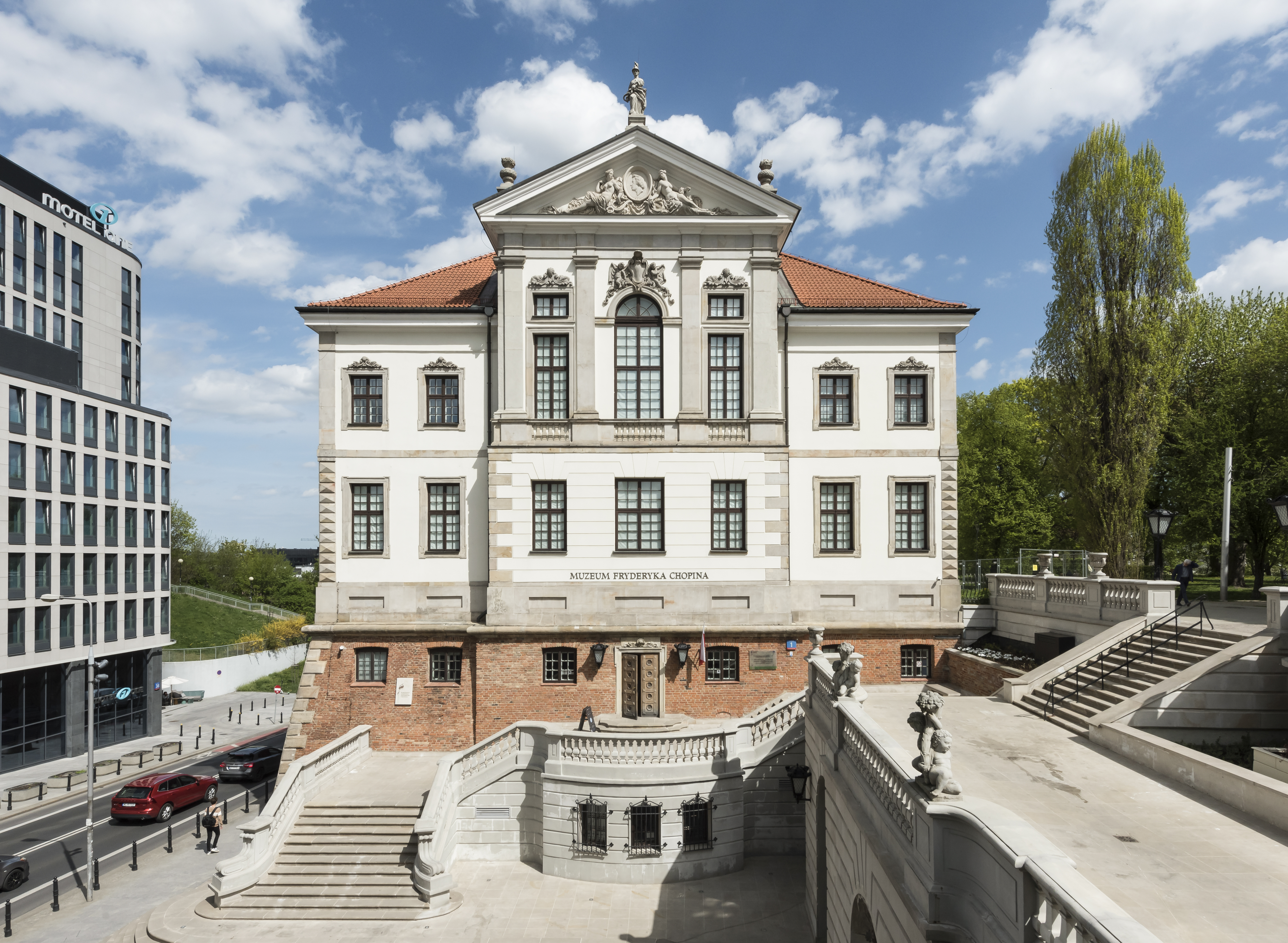
Fryderyk Chopin Museum in the Ostrogski Palace

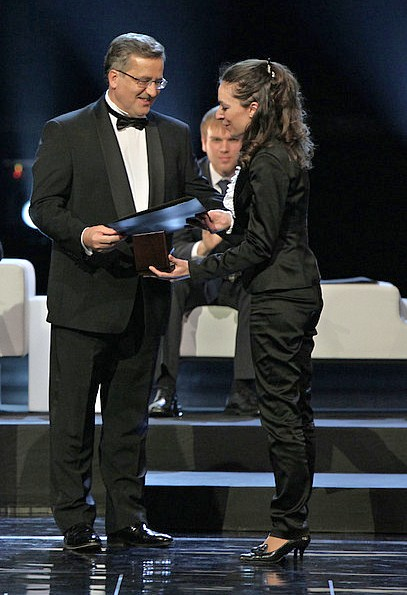
During 16th International Chopin Piano Competition, President Bronisław Komorowski presenting the first prize to winner Yulianna Avdeeva

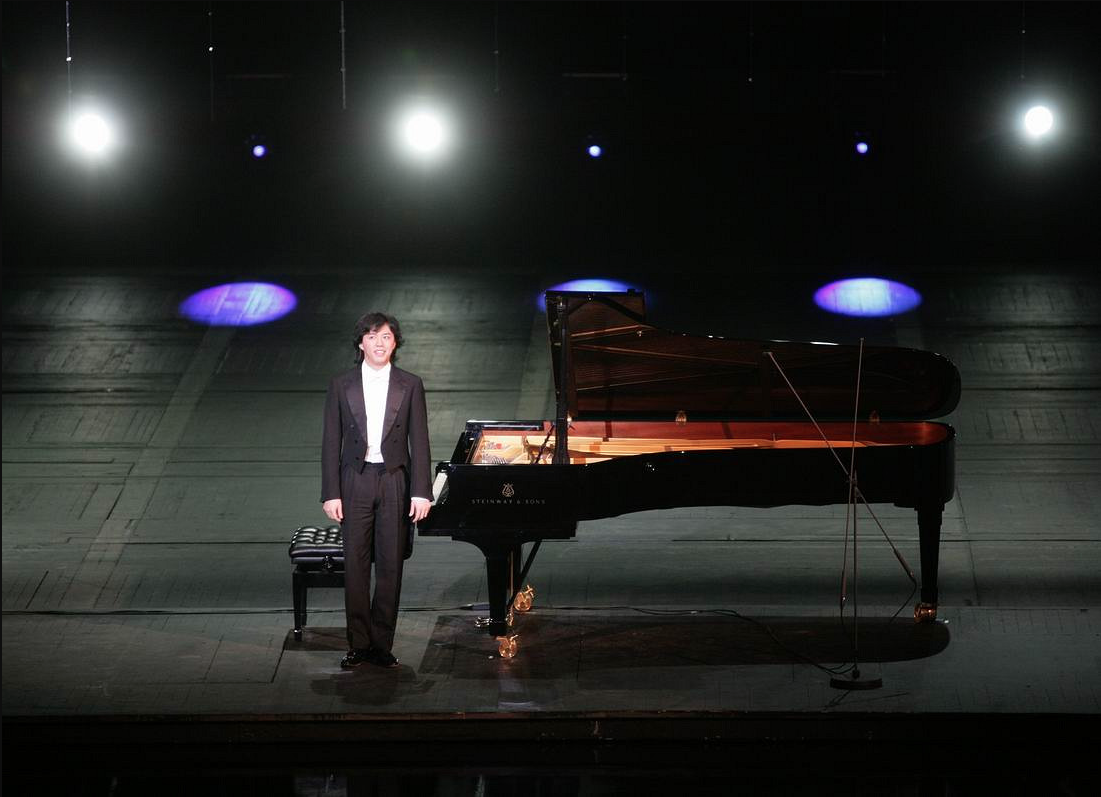
Pianist Yundi performing at the Birthday Decade, Chopin Year 2010

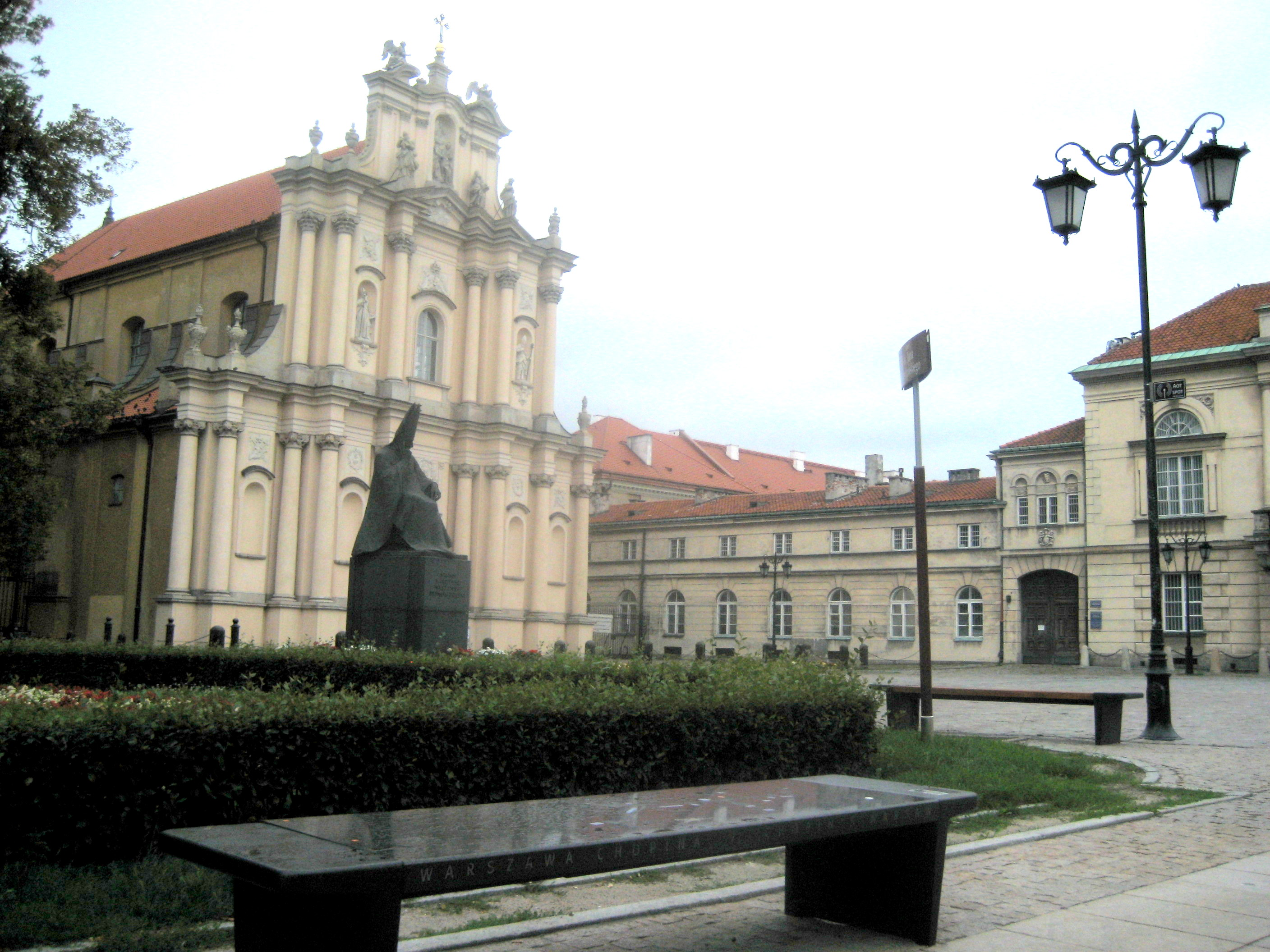
Krakowskie Przedmieście at Visitationist Church, one of the benches featuring Chopin's compositions

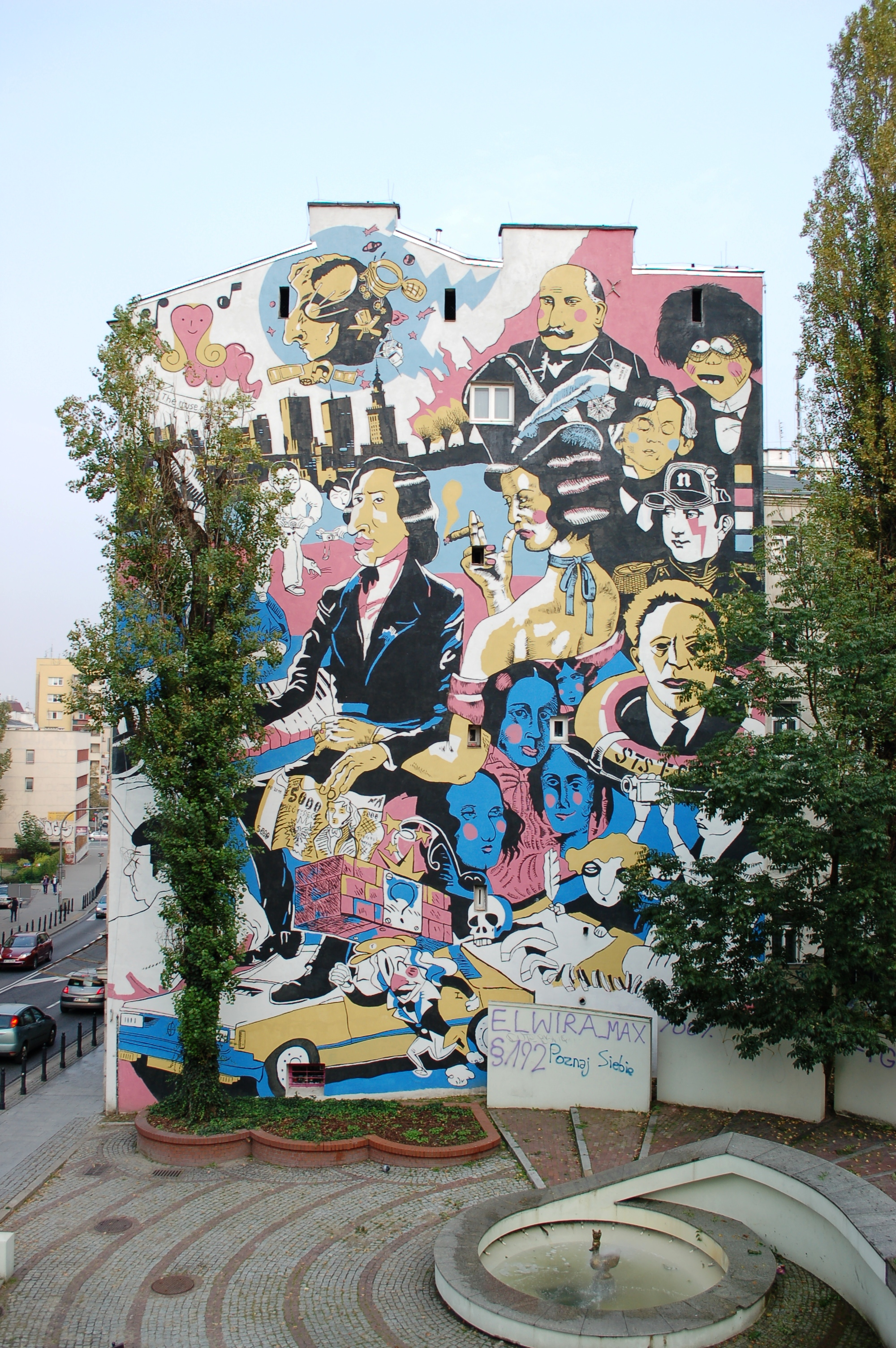
Mural at Tamka Street, Warsaw, next to the Ostrogski Palace

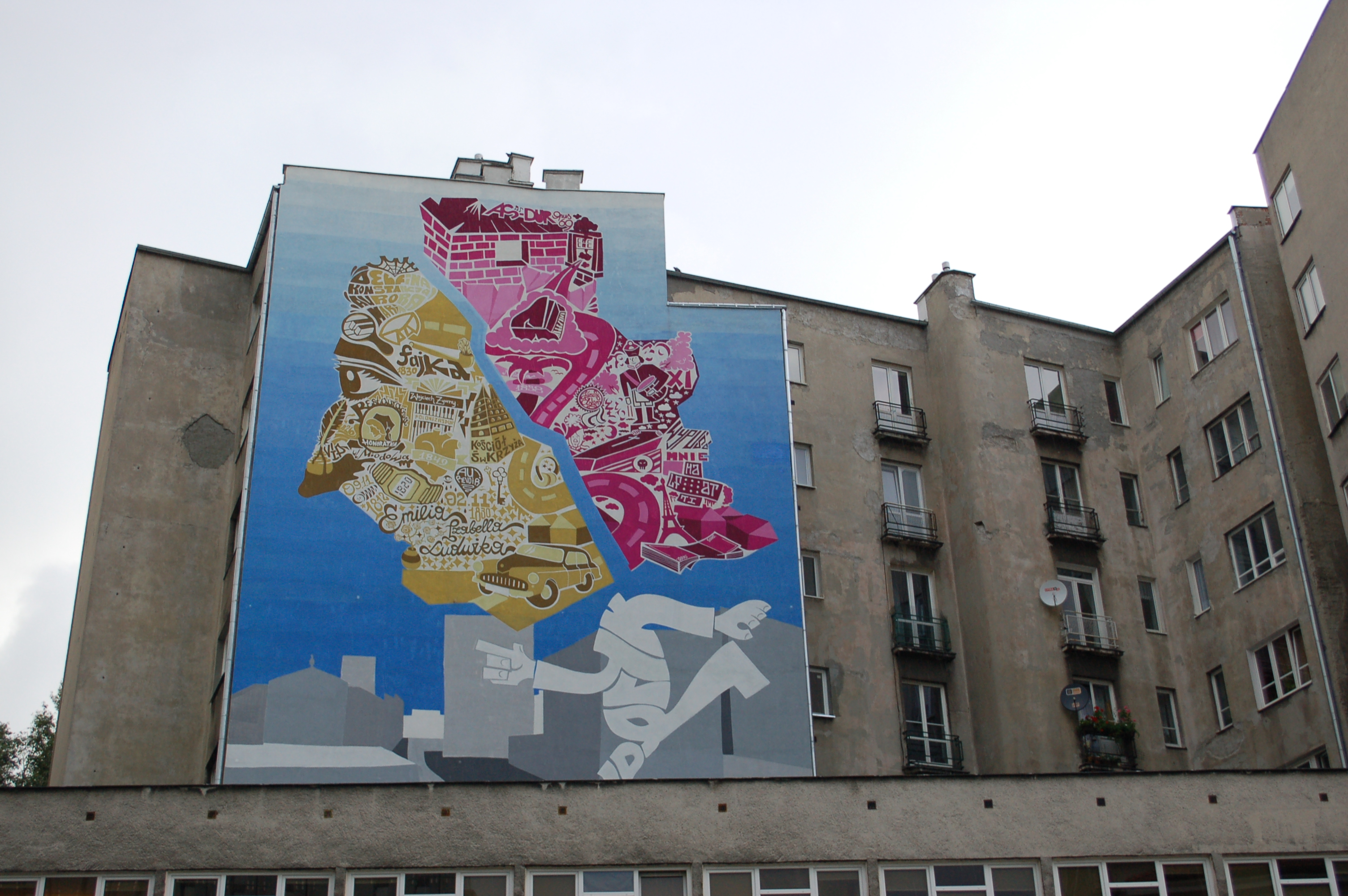
Mural at Tamka Street, Warsaw, next to the Fryderyk Chopin Museum

On the occasion of the 150th anniversary of Frédéric Chopin's birth, by the resolution of State Council of the Polish People's Republic of May 8, 1958, 1960 was officially announced as the Chopin Year. The Chopin Year Committee was established, with Leon Kruczkowski as its chairman.

== 2010 ==
Established by both the resolution of the Sejm of the Republic of Poland of May 9, 2008 and the resolution of the Senate of Poland of October 7, 2009, 2010 was officially announced as the Chopin Year, which is the 200th anniversary of the birth of Frédéric Chopin. On the occasion of the anniversary, state and local government institutions, universities, foundations and associations organised a great variety of cultural events in many Polish cities. In particular, concerts, festivals and artistic events popularizing the composer's work were held in Warsaw. The capital authorities undertook promotional activities, reminding people that Chopin lived in Warsaw from the age of 7 months to the age of 20.

=== Museums ===
- opening of the new multimedia exhibition in Fryderyk Chopin Museum, in the Ostrogski Palace

=== Congresses, event series ===
- 3rd International Congress Chopin 1810-2010 Ideas – Interpretations – Influences
- Chopin Year at the University of Warsaw - exhibitions, concerts, outdoor events, lectures
- VIII Chopiniana - Chopin Days in Warsaw

=== Music events, festivals, concerts ===
- 16th International Chopin Piano Competition
- ballet Chopin at the Grand Theatre (libretto by Antoni Libera, choreography by Patrice Bart )
- The Birthday Decade (The Longest Birthday): the first of three events of the Chopin Year, arising from doubt surrounding Chopin's actual date of birth. As a result, the Birthday Decade featured a series of concerts held between 22 February (the date on church records) and 1 March (the date used by Chopin and his family) Over 170 hours, performers included Martha Argerich, Yundi Li, Daniel Barenboim, Rafał Blechacz, Dang Thai Son, Evgeny Kissin, Garrick Ohlsson and Murray Perahia
- 6th International Music Festival Chopin and his Europe - concerts, recitals
- folk festival All Mazurkas of the World
- La Folle Journée de Varsovie - Chopin Open festival dedicated to Chopin and his friends - finale at the Grand Theater
- 15th International Piano Festival Musical Floralia – Music in Flowers – Chopin and His Friends – a series of concerts
- Francophonic Festival Chopin inspire Gainsbourg
- concerts in Holy Cross Church - Chopin's Heart
- a series of anniversary concerts at the National Philharmonic
- a series of concerts in the urban space Chopin on Krakowskie Przedmieście
- Chopin concert series, Music, Letters
- Independence Day concert Touch Independence
- concerts in the Łazienki Park
- verbal and musical concerts in the Podchorążówka (Salon Pamiątek Ignacy Jan Paderewski ) in Łazienki
- Chopinomania open-air concerts (in Warsaw, Kraków and Sopot )
- concerts of the Chopin University of Music
- musical project Polish Chopin Artists Played - pieces of electronic music (IDM, ambient, breakcore and experimental) referring to Chopin's work
- musical picnic Chopin Children's Day in the Saxon Garden
- Chopiniada – Chopin miniatures
- Chopin elements at the Warsaw Autumn festival
- Chopin Dance Project – international meetings of dance theaters
- 1st Chopin Festival of Young Composers. Transgressions

=== Artistic events, exhibitions, installations ===
- opening of works by graphic artist Osvald Klapper Chopin in the Czech Republic for fun at Chopin Airport
- promotional concert and exhibition of the National Edition of Chopin's Works
- Dutch tulips Chopin's Prelude in the Royal Łazienki Park
- theater festival Central Warsaw – Migrations
- Street Art Cheering festival – painting, among others Chopin murals
- the piano at Castle Square connected to the castle tower by several long metal strings, which transmitted vibrations of sounds from Chopin's recordings played in the tower to the strings of the instrument
- Mapping Chopin installation by Paweł Janicki
- installation by Jarosław Kapuściński Where is Chopin?
- installation of Ewa Wesołowska's Note on the pond in the Oliwa Park in Gdańsk
- competition and poster exhibition Fryderyk! Return to Warsaw!
- competition for spots encouraging foreigners to visit the capital in the Chopin Year Visit Chopin in Warsaw on the MillionYou.com website
- Chopin game online
- Chopin tram running from June to September, with 36 posters from the Fryderyk! competition displayed inside. Return to Warsaw!, and passengers could listen to Chopin's music performed by pianist Krzysztof Trzaskowski played from MP3
- city New Year's Eve party with Chopin elements

piano concert of Chopin's music Flower by Kenzo

- Viva Comet Awards – musical setting with fragments of Chopin's works, a special piece dedicated to Chopin
- Night of Museums in Warsaw - the event included: Night with Chopin - a performance by the AKT street theater, a series of night concerts Waiting for Chopin, Concerto in F minor for you
- Chopin's birthday - online plebiscite on knowledge about Frédéric Chopin
- Chopin's Piano exhibition
- exhibition at the Museum of Caricature
- exhibition University in Chopin's time

=== Cinematography ===
- film promoting Chopin's city of Warsaw (directed by Kordian Piwowarski ) in 8 language versions
- review of the composer's film biographies at the Iluzjon cinema
- screening of the film Chopin's Love and Tears

=== Gadgets ===
- Chopin's ceramic nose cast from the composer's sculpture from the Royal Łazienki Park (by Robert Pludra )
- white and red lollipops in the shape of Chopin's head
- stamps in the shape of a pianist's head by Lucyna Lubińska
- Cho-Pins stamps in the shape of the outline of Poland with the inscription I love Chopin
- gloves with keys instead of fingers
- Chopin rag cuddly toys
- Coca-Cola refrigerators with Chopin's image placed at kiosks throughout the city
- In 2010, each born child registered in Warsaw received a commemorative Chopin outfit (bodysuit)

=== Luxury items ===
- jewelry Cuffs (by Małgorzata Matuszewska ) - 1st place in the competition "Chopin - the shape of Music"
- bracelets decorated with musical notes
- alcohol: luxurious series of Preludium, Sonata, Scherzo
- chocolates: Wedel chocolate box

== Bibliography ==
- Chopin is everywhere . "Polska the Times - Warsaw". 76, pp. 4–5, 2010-02-19.
