= Golden duck =

Golden duck may refer to:

- Golden duck (cricket), players who are dismissed by the first ball they face
- Golden Duck Award for Excellence in Children's Science Fiction Literature
- Złota Kaczka (Polish for golden duck), a Polish film award
- Gold Duck (Złota kaczka), a legendary creature from Warsaw's urban legends
