= Chaoyang masses =

Public informants in Beijing, China

- Nickname: "The fifth largest intelligence agency in the world"
- Formation: Early 2010s
- Location: Chaoyang district, Beijing, China

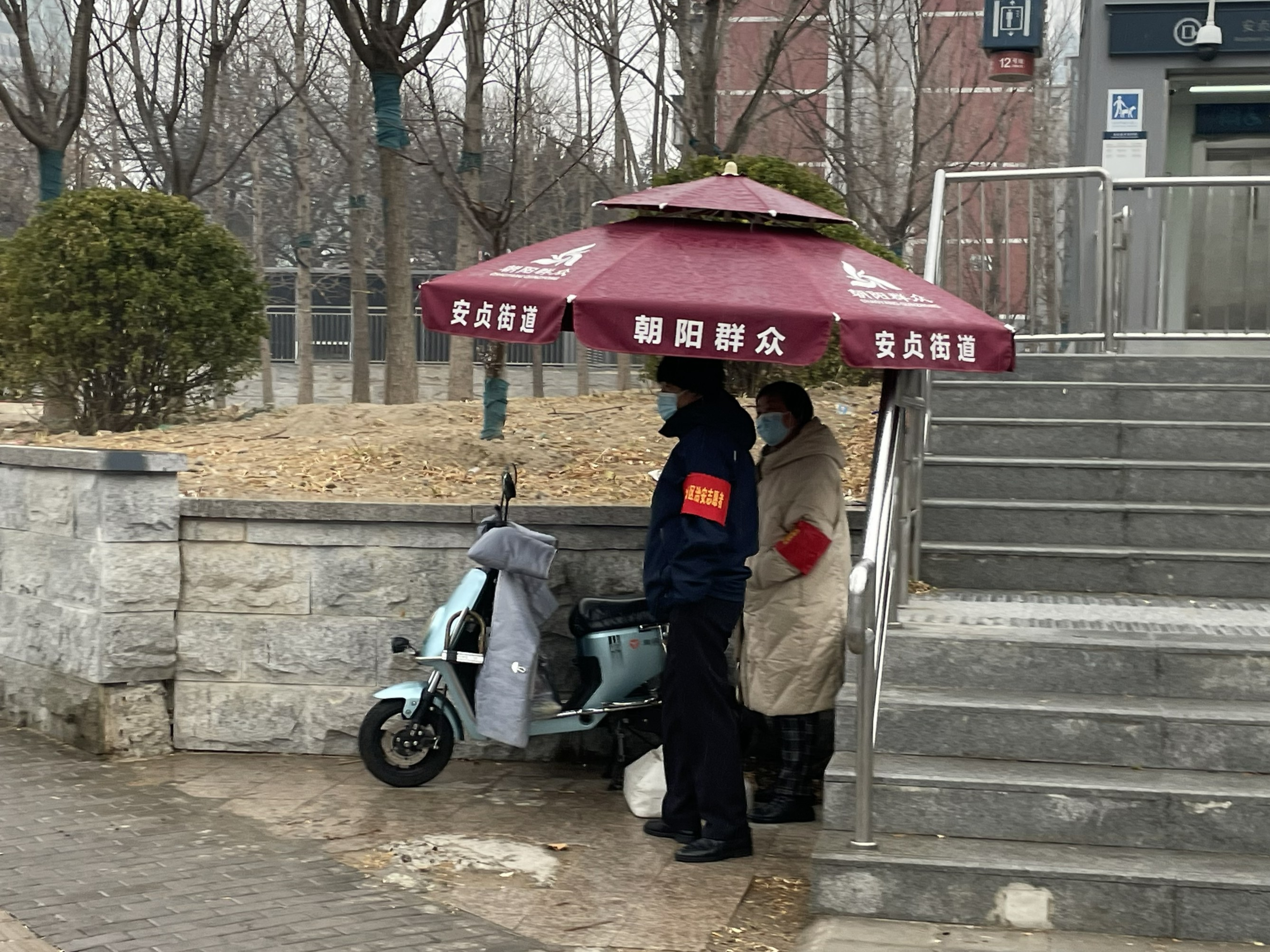

The Chaoyang masses (simplified Chinese: 朝阳群众; traditional Chinese: 朝陽群眾; pinyin: Cháoyáng qúnzhòng), also referred to as the Chaoyang public, are a group of public informants who cooperate with Beijing law enforcement to report on illegal or dangerous activity in the city.

Named after the Beijing district, China's capital city where they originated, the term first appeared in official reports in the 2010s, and become popular after police credited public informers with tips that led to the arrest of Charles Xue in 2013 for soliciting a sex worker. In early 2015, local interest in the group grew as it was continuously credited by police. In March 2015, police credited the group on its official Weibo account for essential information that led to a drug bust. In 2016, the Ministry of Justice and China Central Television selected the Chaoyang masses as the "Most Influential Actor for Rule of Law". By 2017, the group had established themselves as the best-known among several that ran the city's neighbourhoods, with Beijing police releasing a mobile phone app named after it for citizens to provide tip-offs. During an inspection of Beijing in 2017, CCP general secretary Xi Jinping spoke fondly of the group along with a similar group called Xicheng Aunties, saying in reference to their common gear when not in stealth mode, "Where there are more red armbands, there will be greater security and greater peace of mind." By February 2018, the group had reportedly grown to 140,000 members, predominantly retirees. According to a report from early 2021, they earned between 300 and 500 Renminbi (between 35 and 60 pounds sterling) per month.

After the arrest of concert pianist Li Yundi in October 2021 for allegedly soliciting a sex worker, for which police gave credit to the Chaoyang masses, there was renewed interest in the group within China; the hashtag: #Who exactly are Chaoyang masses? was viewed at least 310 million times on Weibo, and Chinese netizens expressed astonishment about its apparent effectiveness. A song called "The Chaoyang Masses" became a trending top on the internet.

In China, the group is jokingly referred to as "one of the top 5 intelligence agencies in the world", following the CIA, Mossad, FSB and MI6.
