= Gold Duck =

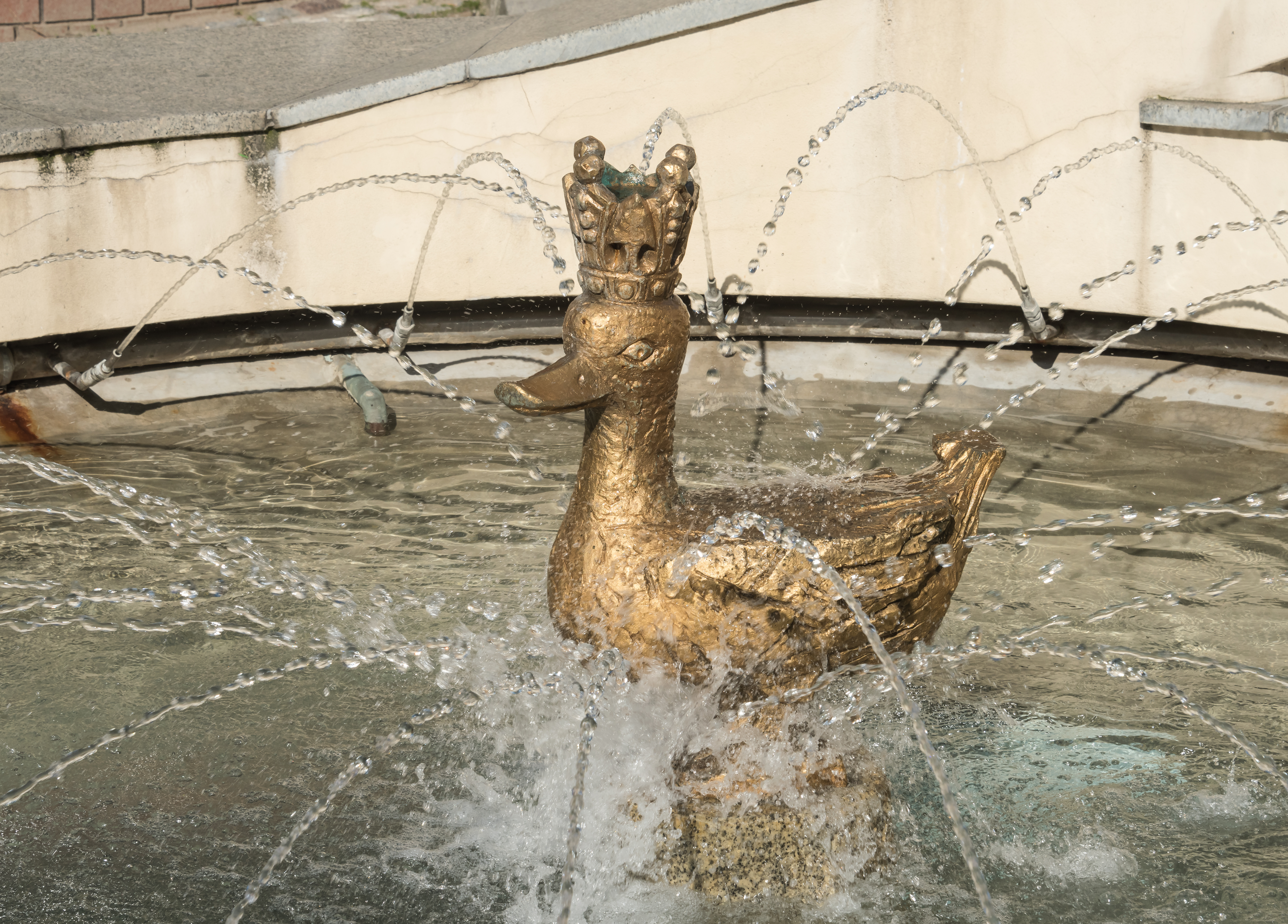
Warsaw's Gold Duck at Ostrogski Palace by sculptor Stanisław Kulon

Złota Kaczka (Polish for "Gold Duck") is the heroine of a folk tale which has been recounted with many settings and by many writers, including the Young Poland poet Artur Oppman.

The story has come to be most closely associated with Warsaw, Poland.

== Plot ==
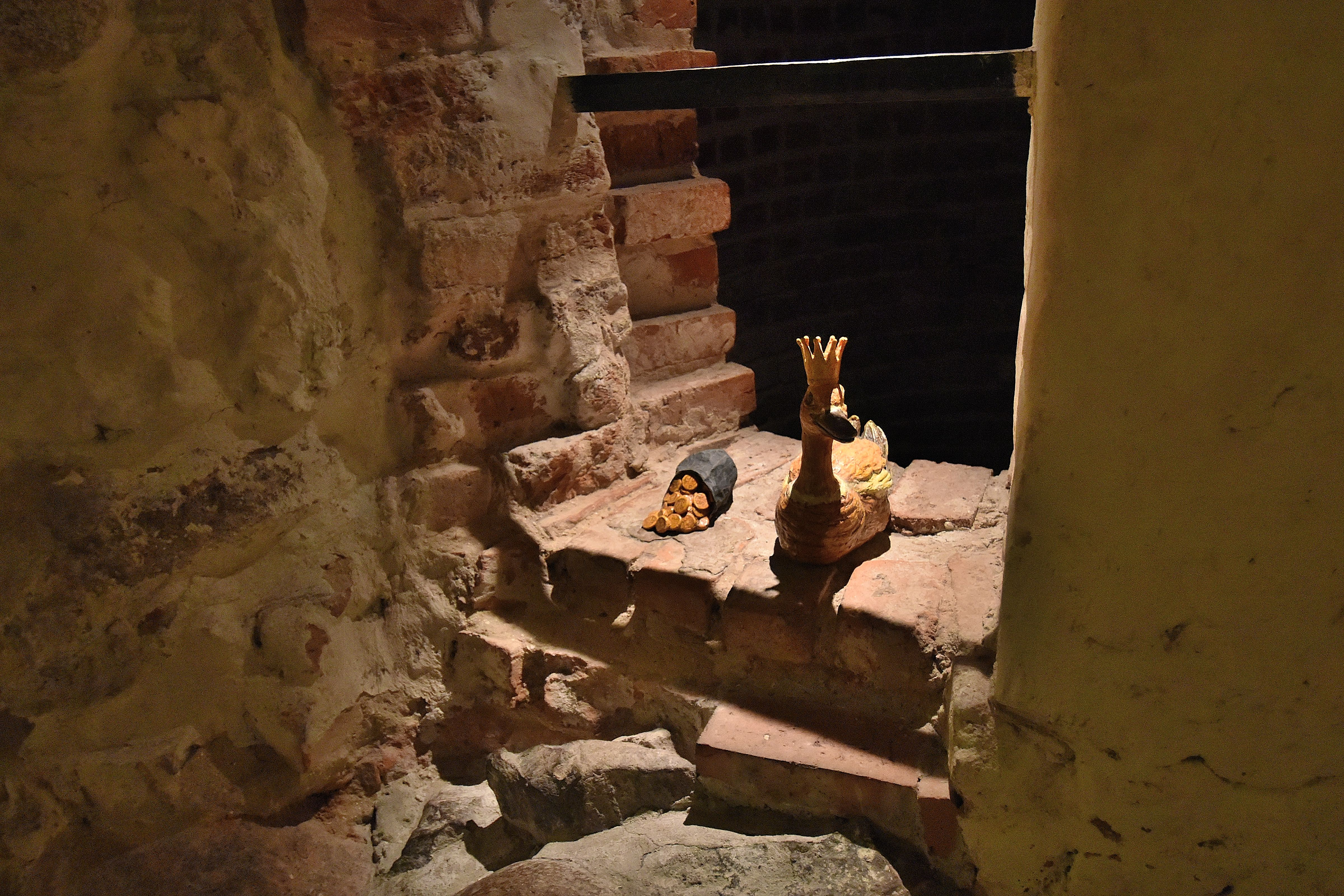
Gold Duck and sack of gold ducatsin the cellars of Warsaw's Royal Castle

In one version the Gold Duck, a princess who had been bewitched by an evil sorcerer, swam in a lake beneath Warsaw's Ostrogski Castle (now home to the Fryderyk Chopin Museum). She could be restored to human form only by someone who could spend 100 ducats a day over three consecutive days, without sharing this fortune with anyone.

A certain soldier was close to succeeding. But as the third day was drawing to a close, he gave the last grosz (penny) to a beggar, and the Gold Duck vanished together with the castle.

== See also ==
- Sleeping Beauty

== Bibliography ==
- Encyklopedia Polski, Kraków, Wydawnictwo Ryszard Kluszczyński, 1996, ISBN 83-86328-60-6.
