= Yundi =

Chinese pianist (born 1982)

Yundi Li
- 李云迪
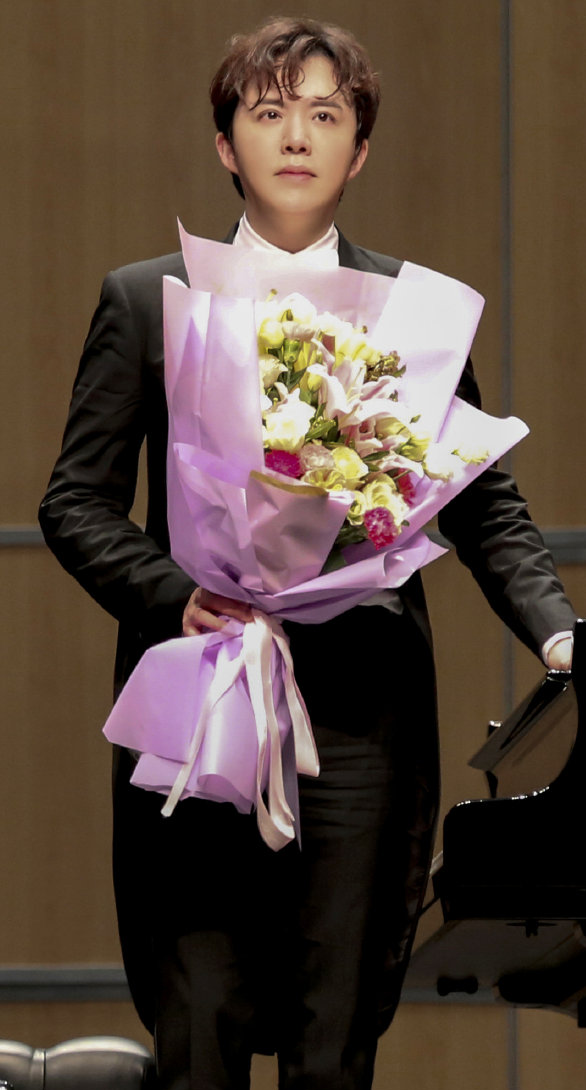
- Yundi in 2019
- Born: 7 October 1982 (age 44); Chongqing, Sichuan, China
- Citizenship: Hong Kong
- Education: Shenzhen Arts School; Hochschule für Musik Hannover
- Occupation: Pianist
- Years active: 1994–present
- Awards: (gold) First Prize, XIV International Chopin Piano Competition (2000)
- Honours: Silver Medal for Merit to Culture – Gloria Artis Gold Medal for Merit to Culture – Gloria Artis
- Musical career
- Genre: Classical
- Instrument: Piano
- Labels: Deutsche Grammophon; EMI Classics; Warner Classics
- Website: www.yundimusic.com

Chinese name
- Traditional Chinese: 李雲迪
- Simplified Chinese: 李云迪
Transcriptions
Standard Mandarin
- Hanyu Pinyin: Lǐ Yúndí

Yundi Li (simplified Chinese: 李云迪; traditional Chinese: 李雲迪; pinyin: Lǐ Yúndí; born 7 October 1982), also mononymously known as Yundi (stylized as YUNDI), is a Chinese classical pianist. He is considered one of the most prominent contemporary interpreters of Frédéric Chopin and is also especially known for his interpretations of Franz Liszt and Sergei Prokofiev. He is the winner of the XIV International Chopin Piano Competition in Warsaw, Poland.

In 2000, at 18 years old, Yundi rose to fame for being the youngest pianist to ever win the International Chopin Piano Competition. In 2015, he also served as the competition's youngest-ever juror. In recognition to his contribution to Chopin pieces, the Polish government awarded Yundi with the world's first Chopin passport (Chopinowskie paszporty). Yundi is also the first Chinese recipient of both the Silver (2010) and Gold (2019) Gloria Artis Medals for Merit to Culture issued by the Ministry of Culture and National Heritage of the Polish government, in regards to his contribution to both music and Polish culture.

Yundi has promoted Chinese national music worldwide, as well as the development of classical music in China. In 2021, he was detained by Beijing police on allegations of soliciting prostitution and was subsequently removed from the Chinese Musicians' Association. In 2022, a document released by the United States Department of Justice stated that derogatory information about him "may have been manufactured". He resumed his performing career in 2023 with a comeback tour in Australia and has since returned to major international venues, including Carnegie Hall.

== Early life and education ==
Yundi Li was born in Chongqing, Sichuan, China on 7 October 1982. Both his father, Li Chuan (李川), and his mother, Zhang Xiaolu (张小鲁), worked for the Chongqing Iron and Steel Company. Although his family was not musically inclined, he began a formal music education at a very young age. At age three, he was so interested in an accordion performance at a shopping mall that he refused to leave, and his parents subsequently bought him an accordion. He studied with Tan Jianmin, a local music teacher, learning the instrument so quickly that he won the top prize at the Chongqing Children's Accordion Competition in March 1987.

Yundi began studying piano with Wu Yong at the age of seven. Two years later, Wu introduced him to Dan Zhaoyi, a well-known piano teacher, with whom he studied for nine years. In 1994, Yundi enrolled at the Shenzhen Arts School to join Dan, who had recently taken up a position there, with whom he studied for the next six years. Yundi attracted interest from renowned schools of music, including the Eastman School of Music and the Juilliard School, and was invited to study at the latter by Jerome Lowenthal. From 2001 to 2006, he studied under Arie Vardi at the Hochschule für Musik, Theater und Medien Hannover in Hannover, Germany.

== Career ==
=== 2000–2009: Signing with Deutsche Grammophon ===
Yundi has gained international recognition since winning the XIV International Chopin Piano Competition in 2000, where he became the first competitor to be awarded the first prize in 15 years since Stanislav Bunin won it in 1985. He was also the youngest competitor ever to win first prize, in addition to also being the first Chinese first-prize winner. Since then, he has collaborated with international orchestras such as the Berlin Philharmonic Orchestra, the Leipzig Gewandhausorchester, the Mahler Chamber Orchestra, and the Philharmonia Orchestra.

In 2001, Yundi became the first Chinese pianist signed by Deutsche Grammophon (DG), recording exclusively for DG until 2008. On December 19, 2001, his first album, Yundi Li: Chopin, was released globally from Beijing. In Japan, it sold 200,000 copies, and, in Hong Kong, it broke platinum sales within 10 days of release, for which it won the IFPI Hong Kong Top Sales Award. In a review, Gramophone praised his DG début album for faithfully mirroring "his unequivocal triumph" in every recording: "Everything is naturally and enviably proportioned (a rare but necessary attribute in the ever-elusive Chopin)‚ everything fuelled alike by a style and poise way beyond his teenage years".

Yundi made his Carnegie Hall debut in 2003, performing in a concert celebrating the 150th Anniversary of Steinway & Sons. Bernard Holland of The New York Times wrote: "Yundi Li, a young but seasoned competition gladiator, played Chopin and Liszt with a promising mix of elegance and impetuosity." His orchestral debut in the United States took place the next month, when he played Chopin's Piano Concerto No. 1 with the Philadelphia Orchestra. He was also honored at a special reception at the home of the Chinese Ambassador to the United States, where he performed for various officials of the US State Department.

Deutsche Grammophon released Yundi's second recording, Yundi Li: Liszt, in August 2003, which was named among the "Best Classical CD's of the Year" by The New York Times. This album also won the German Echo Klassik Solistische Einspielung des Jahres (transl. Solo Recording of the Year) and the Chinese Gold Record Award, as well as nominated for Edison Award's Instrumentale Solorecitals (transl. Instrumental Soloist). Harris Goldsmith of Musical America wrote that it "includes perhaps the finest account of the B-minor Sonata I have ever heard—[it] is, if anything, light years ahead in patrician elegance: exquisite artistry from one of the greatest talents to surface in years—nay, decades." His third recording, Chopin: Scherzi/Impromptus, comprising Chopin's four scherzi and three impromptus, was released in 2004. Anthony Tommasini of The New York Times praised Yundi's recording for "white-hot virtuosity" and "uncanny clarity". Also in 2004, Yundi gave a recital at the Musikverein, Vienna, performing works by Mozart, Domenico Scarlatti, Robert Schumann, and Liszt.

In April 2004, Yundi completed his North American debut recital tour, which included sold-out performances in Boston, Vancouver, San Francisco, and New York. He made his New York recital debut at the Metropolitan Museum of Art on 24 April, performing Chopin scherzos and the Liszt sonata, among other pieces. In a review of the recital, Allan Kozinn of The New York Times wrote: "Mr. Li deals in a more poetic, deeply considered pianism, delivered without extraneous gestures and body language. One thing Mr. Li showed was that thoughtful interpretation can be every bit as virtuosic and exciting as the showier variety." In May, Yundi gave concerts at the National Museum in Warsaw, representing cultural exchange between China and Poland.

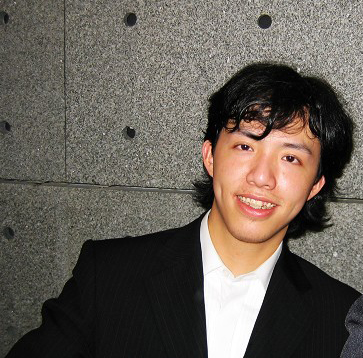
Yundi in 2005

In 2005, Yundi became the first Chinese pianist to appear on the cover of the Wall Street Journal and Aera magazine. He obtained Hong Kong residency in 2006 and was among the first group of successful applicants under the recently announced Quality Migrant Admission Scheme. In 2007, Yundi became the first Chinese pianist to record live with the Berlin Philharmonic Orchestra and Seiji Ozawa. Deutsche Grammophon released Prokofiev's Piano Concerto No. 2 and Maurice Ravel's Piano Concerto in G Major, which garnered positive reviews—it was named Editor's Choice by Gramophone and praised by The New York Times as one of the best classical CDs of the year. Bryce Morrison of Gramophone wrote that "his performance of the Prokofiev, in its prodigious, unflagging power and brilliance, far surpasses any other in the catalogue".

Yundi is the subject of the 2008 documentary The Young Romantic: A Portrait of Yundi Li, directed by Barbara Willis Sweete. This documentary "captures the poetic intensity of this young virtuoso as he works with the great Maestro Seiji Ozawa to prepare for his debut with the Berlin Philharmonic Orchestra". In 2008, he became the first Chinese pianist to have a wax sculpture at Madame Tussauds. The same year he appeared among Pennington Great Performers with the Baton Rouge Symphony Orchestra.

On 31 December 2008 and 1 January 2009, Yundi performed as a soloist at the National Centre for the Performing Arts New Year's Concert, playing the second and third movements of Tchaikovsky's Piano Concerto No. 1 with conductor Daniel Harding and the China National Symphony Orchestra, for which they received the warmest applause of the evening. As an encore, he performed a Chopin nocturne, a piece for which he was known. His recitals in South Korea on 15 February 2009 at Goyang Aram Nuri in Gyeonggi Province and on 18 February 2009 at the Seoul Arts Center marked six years since his last performance in the country, having spent the intervening period touring Europe and North America. The programme included works by Chopin, Mussorgsky's Pictures at an Exhibition, and Wang Jianzhong's Five Yunnan Folk Songs. Regarding Pictures at an Exhibition, Yundi noted that because the piece was inspired by paintings, the performance should be vivid like observing an actual exhibition, expressing a variety of paintings marked by solemnity, confidence, sorrow, and gaiety. He also stated that he had long been a fan of Chinese folk music and works by contemporary Chinese composers, and he described the Five Yunnan Folk Songs as coming from China's most exotic region, Yunnan, a quality that he felt translated into the piece.

Additionally, the documentary The Young Romantic: A Portrait of Yundi Li was a top winner at the Gemini Awards in 2009. It won four awards: the Best Performing Arts Program, the Best Direction in a Performing Arts Program, the Best Photography, and the Best Picture Editing in a Comedy, Variety, or Performing Arts Program. It was also nominated for the Audience Award for Best Documentary Feature at the Palm Springs International Film Festival.

=== 2010–2018: Signing with EMI Classics and return to Deutsche Grammophon ===
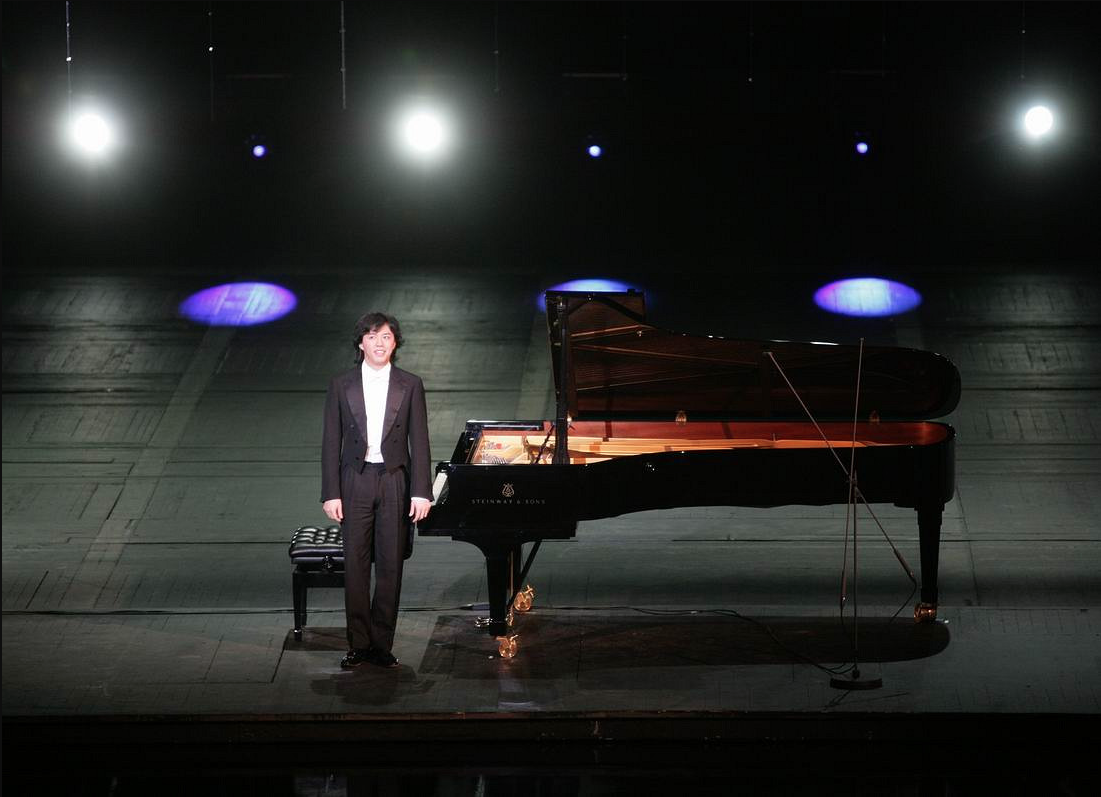
Yundi performing at the Memory Recital of Chopin's Birth 200th Anniversary Concert, Chopin Year 2010

In 2010, Yundi signed an exclusive recording contract with EMI Classics with plans to record Chopin's complete solo piano works.

Also in 2010, the Fryderyk Chopin Institute invited Yundi to perform at The Memory Recital of Chopin's Birth 200th Anniversary Concert, in celebration of Chopin's 200th birthday at Chopin Year. Yundi performed a solo recital at the Royal Festival Hall in London on 16 March 2010. He played a repertoire of Chopin pieces in a sold-out concert.

In May 2012, Yundi officially signed with Universal Music Group and collaborated with Deutsche Grammophon once again. Deutsche Grammophon released his recording of Beethoven sonatas in 2012. It was chosen as one of Classic FM's "Album of the Year 2013" and attained Platinum status in China. Yundi then released The Art of Yundi (2013), containing recordings of the Schumann Fantasie as well as Chopin preludes, ballades, berceuse, and mazurkas.

Yundi launched his "Piano Dream" national tour in Chongqing on 19 August 2013, and brought his music to 30 cities in the next 80 days. Most of those cities were second or third-tier, and in response to questions from media and public, Yundi said it was not demeaning for him to perform in second and third-tier cities and he did not mind the less ideal conditions of some concert halls; he simply wanted to provide more people with an opportunity to appreciate the beauty of classical music.

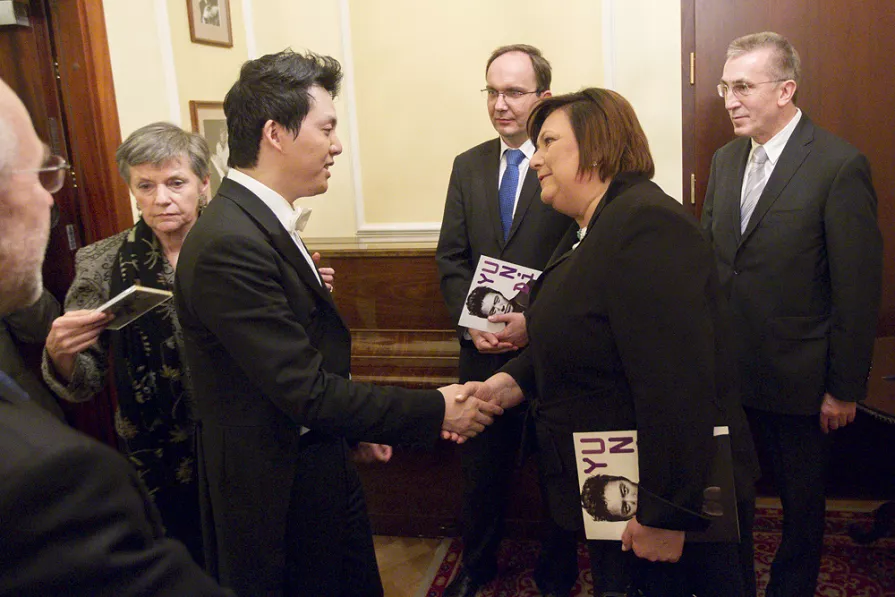
Yundi with First Lady Anna Komorowska in 2014

On 1 March 2014, Yundi performed a piano recital at the Poland's National Philharmonic, celebrating the 204th anniversary of Chopin's birth. Anna Komorowska, then First Lady of Poland, attended the concert.

In July 2015, Yundi embarked on a nine-concert tour with the National Youth Orchestra of the United States led by conductor Charles Dutoit. Comprising mainly the orchestra's debut performances in Asia, the tour started at Purchase College's Performing Arts Center in New York City, performed at Carnegie Hall as the second stop, and ended in Hong Kong. The other six concerts were given in mainland China. On 30 October of the same year, while performing Frédéric Chopin's Piano Concerto No. 1 with the Sydney Symphony Orchestra in Korea, Yundi suffered a memory lapse. He subsequently performed the piece smoothly again with conductor David Robertson and the orchestra. Yundi apologised for his mistake on his weibo, saying it was because of travel fatigue. Limelight reviewer deemed the performance to be a stellar interpretation of Chopin and a "reminder that the gods are, in fact, human, and all the more heroic for that".

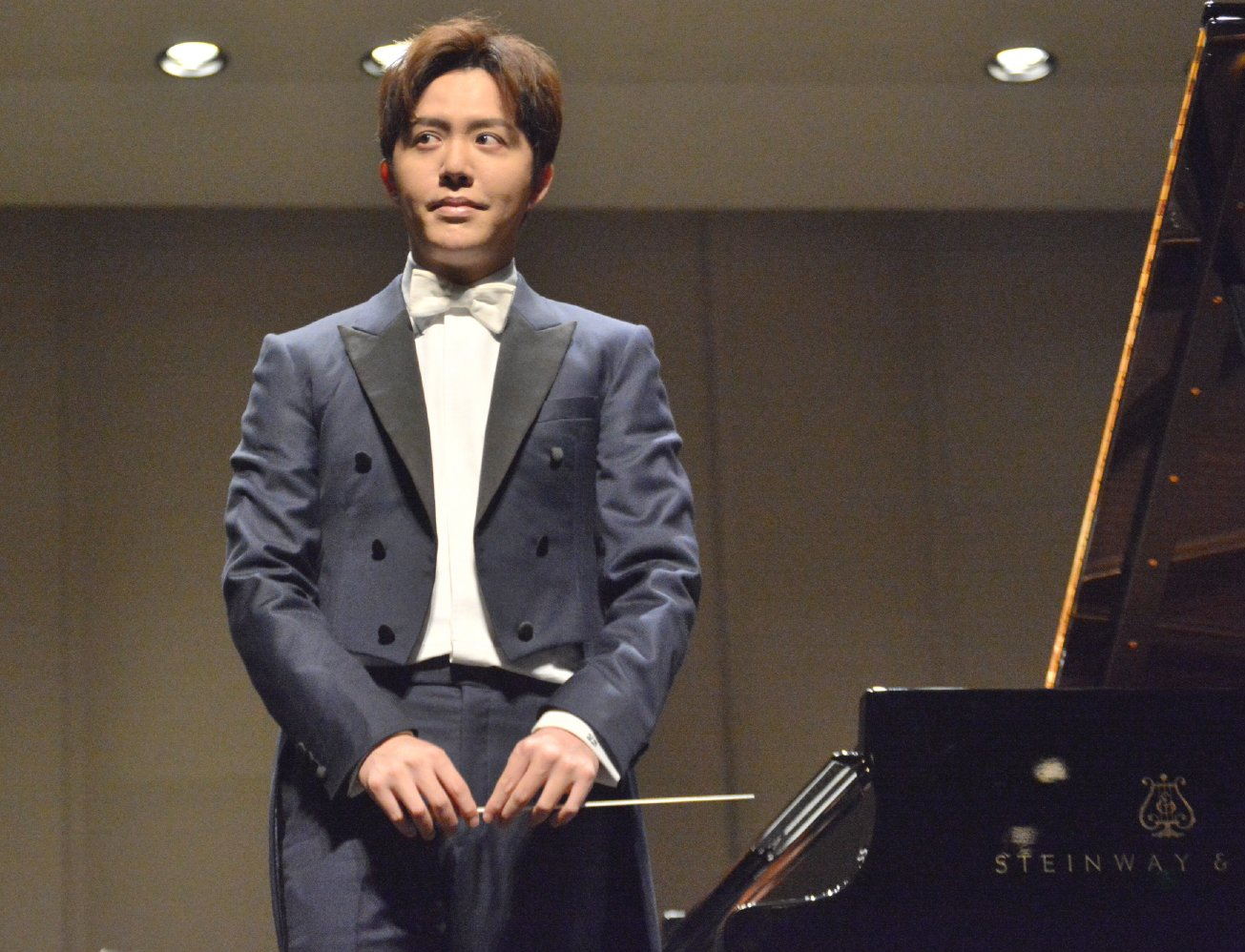
Yundi conducting in 2018 concert

In 2016, Yundi went on a Chopin world tour encompassing Germany, Russia, and the United States. In March, he performed an all-Chopin program in Carnegie Hall, with an encore of Ren Guang's Colorful Clouds Chasing the Moon. Corinna da Fonseca-Wollheim of The New York Times wrote, "he showed off a graduated array of colors and moods, including moments of understated simplicity and tenderness light-years removed from his high-decibel image". On 21 April, he performed at the National Concert Hall of Dublin.

On 8 May 2017, Yundi attended the opening ceremony of the Yundi Art Museum, in the Chongqing Huangjueping Piano Museum – the largest piano museum in China. He performed two pieces at the ceremony. It displays several pianos from different stages of Yundi's career, including his first piano (purchased by his parents when he was seven years old), as well as a collection of his awards, albums and photographs, and a high-tech experience pavilion. Upon seeing the old piano, Yundi played an impromptu piece on it, marking the first time he had touched the instrument in 24 years. The museum integrates piano art with high‑technology features: in the Piano Ensemble Conductor Experience Hall, a visitor may place any score that Yundi has performed onto the conductor's podium, and the system automatically recognizes the page and plays the music; in the Dapeng Wings Multimedia Hall, a touchscreen interface allows a three‑dimensional presentation of Yundi's career and recreates important concert moments. Yundi stated his hope that the museum would encourage children to develop an interest in the piano and cultivate their artistic taste. He also noted that learning the piano can improve a child's concentration, that piano examinations are not the sole purpose of studying the instrument, and that both children and parents should regard such exams with moderation, prioritizing the enhancement of cultural cultivation.

From 29 August to 5 September 2017, Yundi led the Warsaw Philharmonic Orchestra on a five-city concert tour in China, performing Chopin's Piano Concerto No. 1 and No. 2 as both pianist and conductor. It was his conducting debut. This tour was the first of a series of events commemorating the 100th anniversary of Poland's regained independence.

In November 2017, Yundi went on tour playing Mozart's Piano Concerto No. 23 with Staatskapelle Dresden in Germany and China. On 3 November, he gave a live concert at Beijing National Aquatics Center celebrating the 2017 League of Legends World Championship. In 2018, Yundi had a successful debut in Australia and New Zealand. In a series of sold-out concerts, Yundi performed with local orchestras Chopin's Piano Concertos Nos. 1 and 2 as both soloist and conductor.

=== 2019–2021: Signing with Warner Classics and the Chinese Musicians' Association membership revocation ===
In 2019, Yundi signed with Warner Classics, releasing his next album, Chopin's Piano Concertos Nos. 1 & 2, in 2020. The recording contains a performance by the Warsaw Philharmonic Orchestra conducted by Yundi from the piano bench. It was chosen by Donald Vroon of the American Record Guide as one of the "Best of 2020". The International Piano magazine wrote, "This is aristocratic Chopin, unfailing in its clarity, elegance and unforced eloquence. Nothing is over-played, everything is expressed. Yundi Li ranks among the finest, his reading of the F minor Concerto's central love song hauntingly inward looking. The Warsaw Philharmonic offer stout support, and sound and balance are exemplary."

On 21 October 2021, after a tip-off by public informants referred to as the Chaoyang masses, Yundi was detained by Beijing police for allegedly hiring a prostitute. Under Chinese law, Yundi could have been detained for up to 15 days and fined up to 5,000 yuan ($782) for illegally soliciting a sex worker. The Chinese Musicians' Association subsequently revoked Yundi's membership, citing his "extremely negative social impact". Jerome A. Cohen, a law professor specializing in Chinese law at New York University, called the "lack of transparency" about his case "concerning", noting that prostitution is a "time-honored Communist Party claim against political opponents". According to The Guardian on 22 October 2021, "so far, however, there’s no sign that Li’s detention is politically motivated". On 16 March 2022, the United States Department of Justice released a document suggesting "the derogatory information" regarding Yundi "may have been manufactured".

=== 2023–present: Comeback tour in Australia and return to Carnegie Hall ===
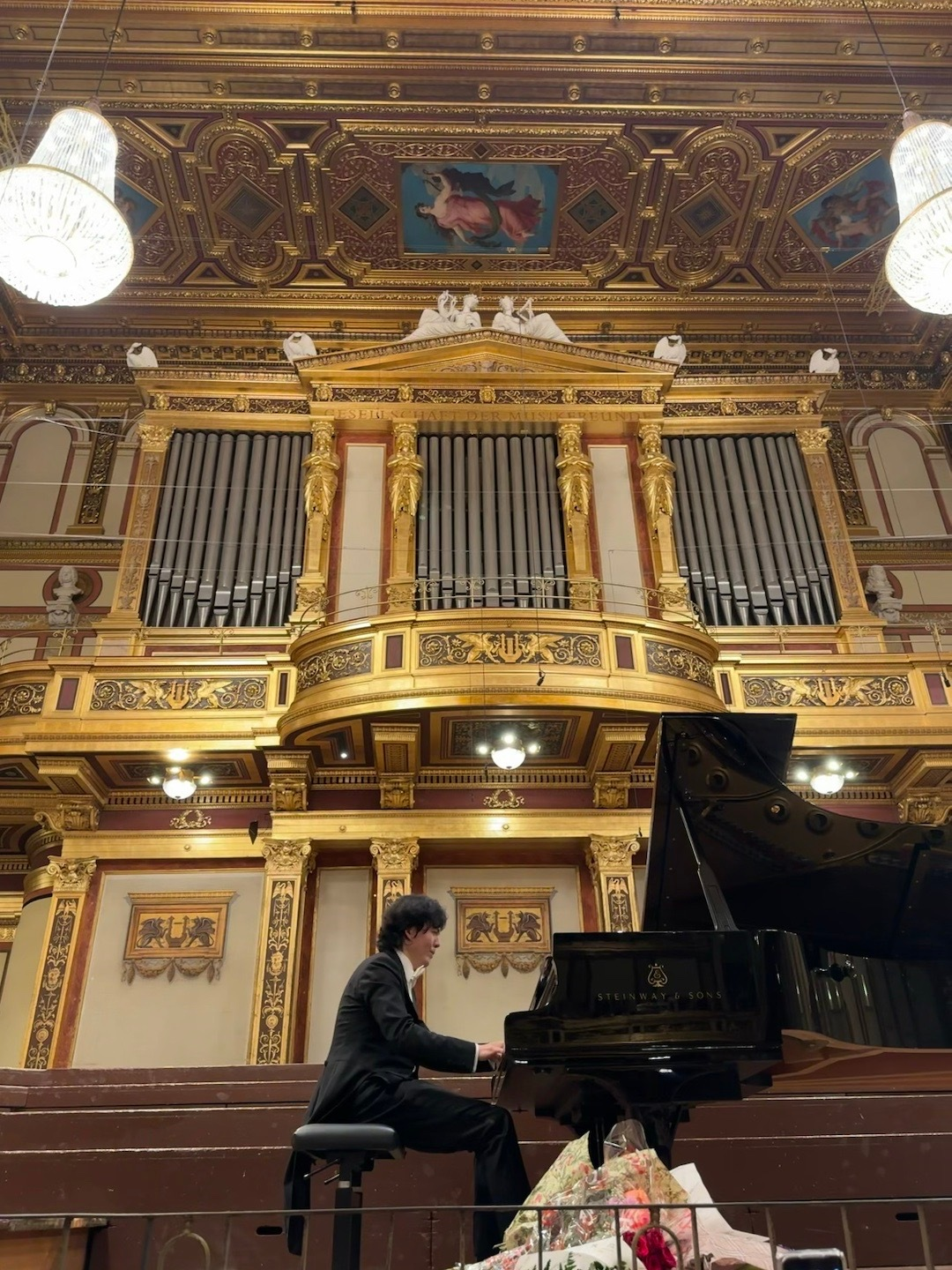
Yundi performing at the Golden Hall, Musikverein, April 2024

In 2023, Yundi embarked on his comeback tour (2023 Australia Coming Back Tour: YUNDI Plays Mozart The Sonata Project 1), the first tour since the 2021 controversy. In Adelaide, Yundi performed Chopin's Nocturne in E Flat Major as an encore. Yundi's comeback tour was regarded by Pizzicato magazine as "excellent" and a "huge success".

In March to May 2024, Yundi embarked on a European Tour titled, "YUNDI Plays Mozart: The Sonata Project 1", visiting cities historically connected with Mozart, including Vienna, Paris, Munich, Frankfurt, Cologne, and Berlin. As part of the tour, he released the album Mozart: The Sonata Project - Salzburg. From September to October, Yundi went on an Asia tour, including Japan and Singapore.

The album "Mozart: The Sonata Project - Salzburg" received positive reviews from Bryce Morrison and Norman Lebrecht, among others. In Gramophone, Morrison wrote, "His approach is a convincing challenge to a more conventional restraint, a restless Sturm und Drang precursor of Romanticism." Lebrecht wrote: "In twelve and a half minutes, Yundi gives Mozart a total makeover. This is the most refreshing and innovative Mozart pianism I have heard in years."

In January 2025, Yundi expanded his Japan tour with four additional concerts, while simultaneously launching a North American tour that included Vancouver, Toronto, New York City and San Francisco. During his tour, he performed a sold-out show at Carnegie Hall, nine years after his previous appearance at Carnegie.

== Repertoire, technique and performance style ==
Regarded as one of the finest interpreters of Chopin, Yundi is also known for his interpretations of Liszt and Prokofiev. His other repertoires, such as Mozart, Beethoven, Ravel and Schumann, have also received acclaim.

=== Chopin ===
Yundi's Fantaisie Impromptu
In Yundi's 2001 album Chopin, his Fantaisie Impromptu

Ivan Hewett of the Telegraph praised Yundi's performance as "beautifully polished and unfailingly elegant", while BBC Music Magazine noted that his "technically precise considered" approach to the music was heightened with "virtuosic flair".

Yundi's technique in Chopin's pieces is described as "He has all that's needed in poetry and sensitivity. His touch is perfect—never heavy, as Biret can be—and yet there is joy, zest, technical aplomb, healthy drama, and unerring tempos and rhythms." by American Record Guide, "flawless, dazzlingly agile, existing in perfect symbiosis with the musical intent – noble and majestic" by French Crescendo Magazine.

=== Liszt and Prokofiev ===
Yundi's interpretations of Liszt were described as "dazzling, daredevil renderings, sheer, heart-stopping beauty" by Allan Kozinn of The New York Times. According to Thomas Michelsen of Politiken, his interpretation of Liszt's works are "a complete and dynamic interpretation of the score, without loss of style or form". According to The New York Times, Yundi "excels in Prokofiev's volatile, technically daunting Piano Concerto No. 2." and "plays with expansive lyricism, surging power and, when called for, incisive attack."

== Achievements ==
=== Competitions ===
Yundi has received top awards at various competitions. He won the Chongqing Children's Piano Competition in 1993 and the Huapo Cup National Competition in Beijing in 1994. In 1995, he was awarded third place at the Stravinsky International Youth Competition. In 1996, he won the third prize in the tenth Hong Kong – Asia Piano Open Competition. In 1997, he won the Concerto "Yellow River" Group of the Chinese Piano Pieces. In 1998, he was awarded the third place at the 1998 Missouri Southern International Piano Competition (Junior Division). The next year, he took third prize at the International Franz Liszt Piano Competition of Utrecht, as well as being a first-prize winner in the China International Piano Competition. In 1999, he won first place at the Gina Bachauer Young Artists International Piano Competition.

In October 2000, selected by the Ministry of Culture of the People's Republic of China to represent the country, Yundi participated in the XIV International Chopin Piano Competition in Warsaw. Yundi was the first competitor to be awarded the First Prize (the gold medal) in 15 years, the last being Stanislav Bunin, who won it in 1985. At 18 years old, Yundi was both the youngest pianist to win first prize and the first Chinese first prize winner in the competition's history. Yundi was also awarded a Special Prize for the "Best Performance of a Polonaise" by the Chopin Society. At one point during the competition, it was reported that the jury was deliberating whether to withhold the first prize once again. However, by the end of the competition, according to a 2000 Los Angeles Times report, the entire auditorium in Warsaw erupted in a standing ovation following Yundi's rendition of the Concerto No. 1, and the panel of 23 judges, which included Martha Argerich, praised his musical approach to Chopin's pieces.

A report from Wirtualna Polska in 2000 stated that, while announcements of some other contestants' results caused some confusion among the journalists, Yundi's victory was received as "undoubtedly justified". Gazeta Wyborcza commented that the selection of Yundi as the first-prize winner ultimately preserved the jury's credibility, despite the overall level of the competition. After the competition, the chairman of the jury, Andrzej Jasiński, summed up the competition in a statement to journalists, stating: "I would also like to emphasize that Yundi Li is very mature for his age, and most importantly - he feels Chopin's music. His interpretations are never controversial; he plays beautifully and has imagination, charm and pearly technique."

=== Awards and honours ===
- 2003: Yundi's album Yudi: Liszt received the German Echo Klassik Solo Recording of the Year Solistische Einspielung des Jahres and China Gold Record Awards, additionally named a "Best CD of the Year" by The New York Times.
- 2004: Yudi: Liszt was nominated Edison Award's Instrumentale Solorecitals (transl. Instrumental Soloist)
- 2005: Yundi won "Best New Classical Artist" of XM Satellite Radio's First Annual XM Nation Music Awards.
- 2006: Yundi won the Nord/LB Artist Award.
- 2010: In May, in recognition of his contribution to music, the Polish Minister of Culture and National Heritage presented Yundi with a Silver Medal for Merit to Culture - Gloria Artis. The same year, the 200th anniversary of Chopin's birth, the Polish government also awarded him the world's first Chopin passport (Chopinowskie paszporty) in recognition of his contribution to Chopin's works..
- 2015: At the age of 33, Yundi served as the juror of XVII International Chopin Piano Competition, making him the youngest-ever juror of International Chopin Piano Competition.
- 2019: In October, Yundi was awarded a Gold Medal for Merit to Culture - Gloria Artis by the Polish government, in recognition to his contribution to Polish culture.
- 2022: Yundi was selected as the Honorary Board of Summa Cum Laude Festival.

== Impact ==
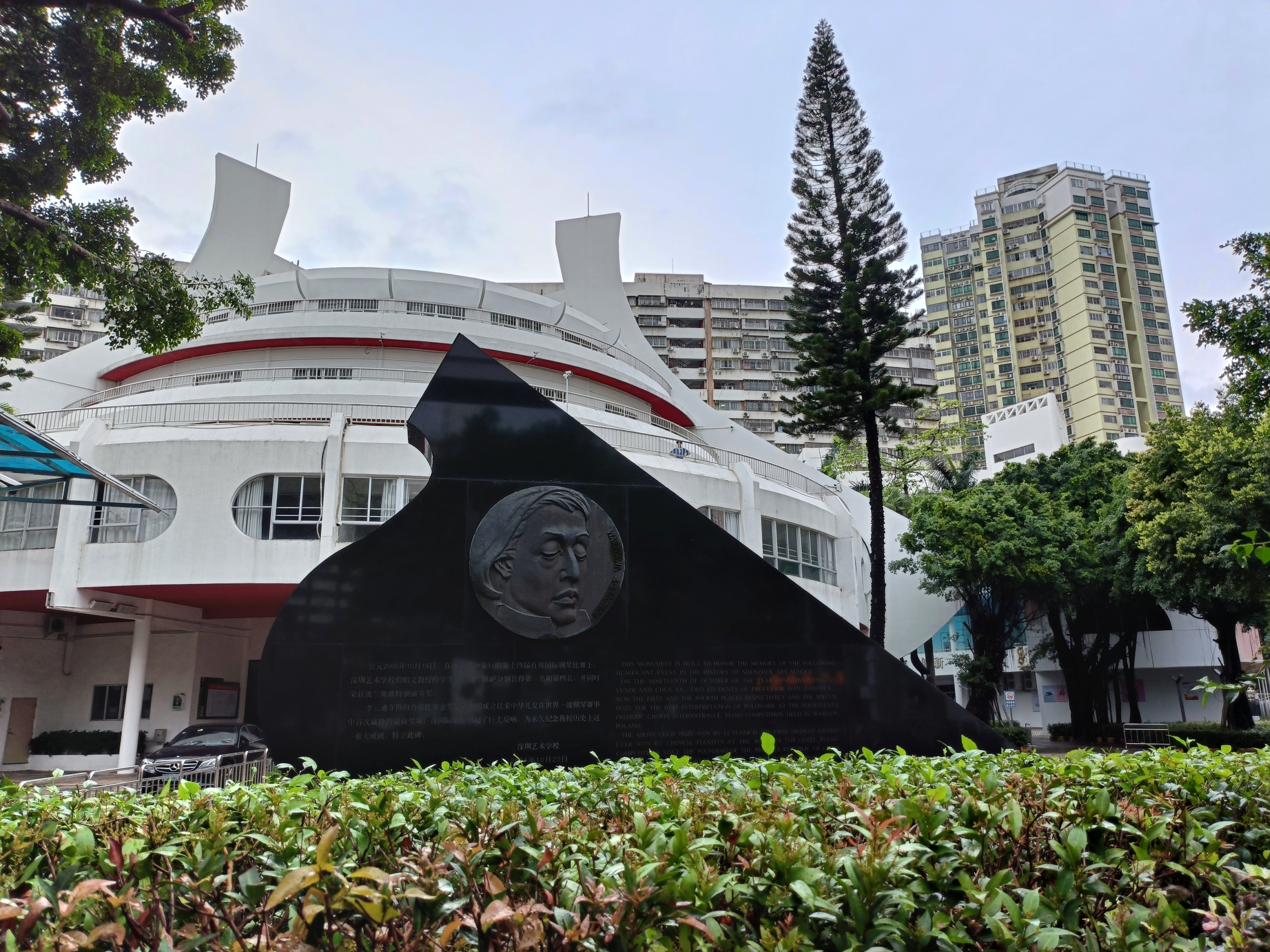
Yundi's Monument at Shenzhen Arts School, celebrating his first-prize in the International Chopin Piano Competition. The commemorative sculpture for Yundi's Chopin Gold Medal at Shenzhen Arts School was sculpted by Qiao Hong.

A study by Amazonia Investiga highlighted Yundi as a notable example of the effectiveness of Chinese pedagogy in music. Additionally, Yundi has promoted Chinese traditional music worldwide by recording traditional Chinese folk melodies. Yundi, alongside Lang Lang, are often the most commonly-named role models of young Chinese musicians in piano. He has given masterclasses at the Royal College of Music, University of Cambridge and Tsinghua University.

== Personal life ==
Yundi owns a cat named Musigny. His hobbies include listening to Verdi. His role-model is Chopin.

"In fact, food can also bring out the feeling of music. For example, in French composer Ravel's classic piece Jeux d'eau, the last line is just like the disappearance of champagne bubbles."

— Yundi in a 2016 interview

=== Philanthropy ===
In 2001, Yundi donated a portion of the sales revenue of his first CD "Yundi Li: Chopin" to the United Nations Children's Fund, aiming to benefit children living in China's economically disadvantaged areas. Since 2008, Yundi has been sponsored by Rolex. He accepted its sponsorship under the condition that the company subsidize music teaching in rural China.

Soon after the 2008 Sichuan Earthquake, Yundi cancelled his European concerts to perform in a fundraising concert in Beijing, along with several other famous musicians of Sichuan origin. Funds raised at the concert were donated to help rebuild schools in Wenchuan County and provide mental health services for children affected by the earthquake. On 29 November 2008, just before the International Day of Persons with Disabilities, Yundi headlined a charity concert held in the Bird's Nest Stadium to support people disabled by the earthquake.

On 11 January 2011, he participated in a charity piano recital in Beijing for the individuals and companies that had contributed to the efforts of the Red Cross Society of China in 2010. Yundi was honored as the Music Ambassador of the Chinese Red Cross Foundation. Beforehand, Yundi told reporters: "Charity is just like music which comes from deep inside my heart. I can express my love for society and my country through my fingers, just like Chopin did." Joining forces with I DO Fund of China Charity Federation in 2016, Yundi helped build the first music classroom and library for Puma Jiangtang Elementary School, the school with the highest altitude (5373 meters) in Tibet. The music classroom was named after Yundi. At the opening ceremony on 1 September, Yundi taught Tibetan children at the school to play the piano.

== Discography ==
Yundi's discography includes 16 studio albums. He has also made five contributions to compilation albums with Deutsche Grammophon not under his name and is featured in the documentary The Young Romantic: A Portrait of Yundi Li. He has achieved considerable commercial and critical success. His albums have ranked on Billboard charts, including the Top Classical Albums.

== Bibliography ==
=== Biography ===
- Christian Soleil (20 May 2025). Yundi Li, sonate pour mains liées: biographie [Yundi Li: The Bound Hands Sonata – A Biography] (in French). ISBN 979-8284614891.

=== Documentary ===
- The Young Romantic: A Portrait of Yundi Li (2008)
