= Tamka Street, Warsaw =

Street in Warsaw

Coordinates: 52°14′14″N 21°01′34″E

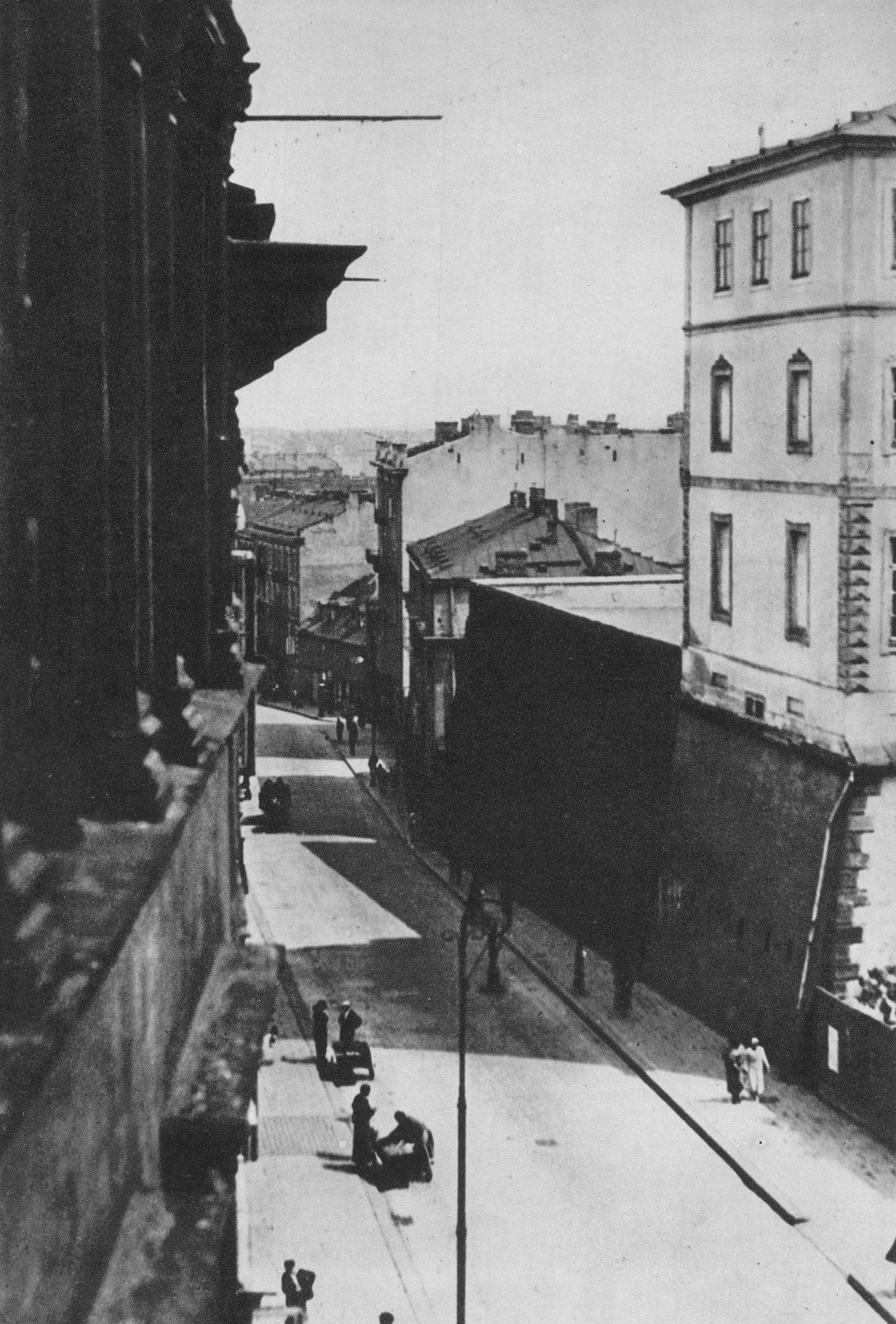
The streets in the 1930s with the Ostrogski Palace on the right

Tamka Street (Polish: ulica Tamka) is a street in the Powiśle district of Warsaw, Poland. The street runs downhill from central Warsaw toward the Vistula River and connects ulica Świętokrzyska with the Świętokrzyski Bridge.

The street's name originates from a small dam (Polish: tama) that once dammed a stream that formerly flowed along the course of the present street. The name was already mentioned as early as 1743, referring to embankments built along the Vistula River.

In 1965, the street, as part of Warsaw's urban layout, was entered into the register of historical monuments. Later, on January 15, 1975, a 42-meter-long footbridge over the street, designed by Łucja Bogaczyk and Zenon Franz, was opened for use.

== Description ==
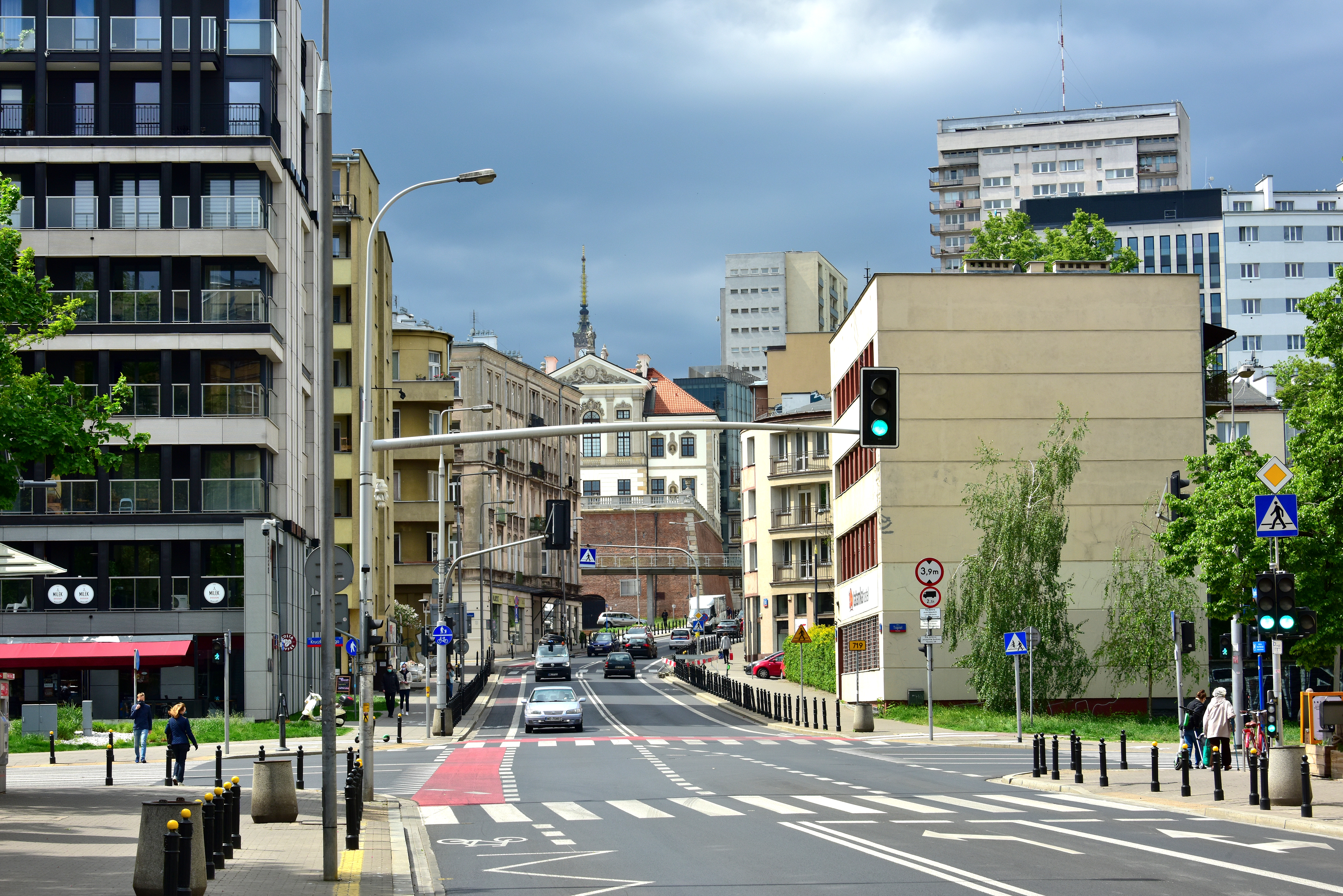
Tamka Street at the intersection with Topiel and Kruczkowskiego Streets in 2020 with Ostrogski Palace in the background

The street begins at Wybrzeże Kościuszkowskie Street in the Powiśle district. It extends up to Mikołaja Kopernika Street, where it ends.

Between Dobra Street and the Świętokrzyski Bridge, the street is one-way, heading toward the bridge. Traffic in the opposite direction, toward Kopernika Street, runs via Zajęcza and Topiel Streets.
