= Ostrogski Palace =

Coordinates: 52°14′11″N 21°01′23″E

Ostrogski Palace Pałac Ostrogskich (in Polish)
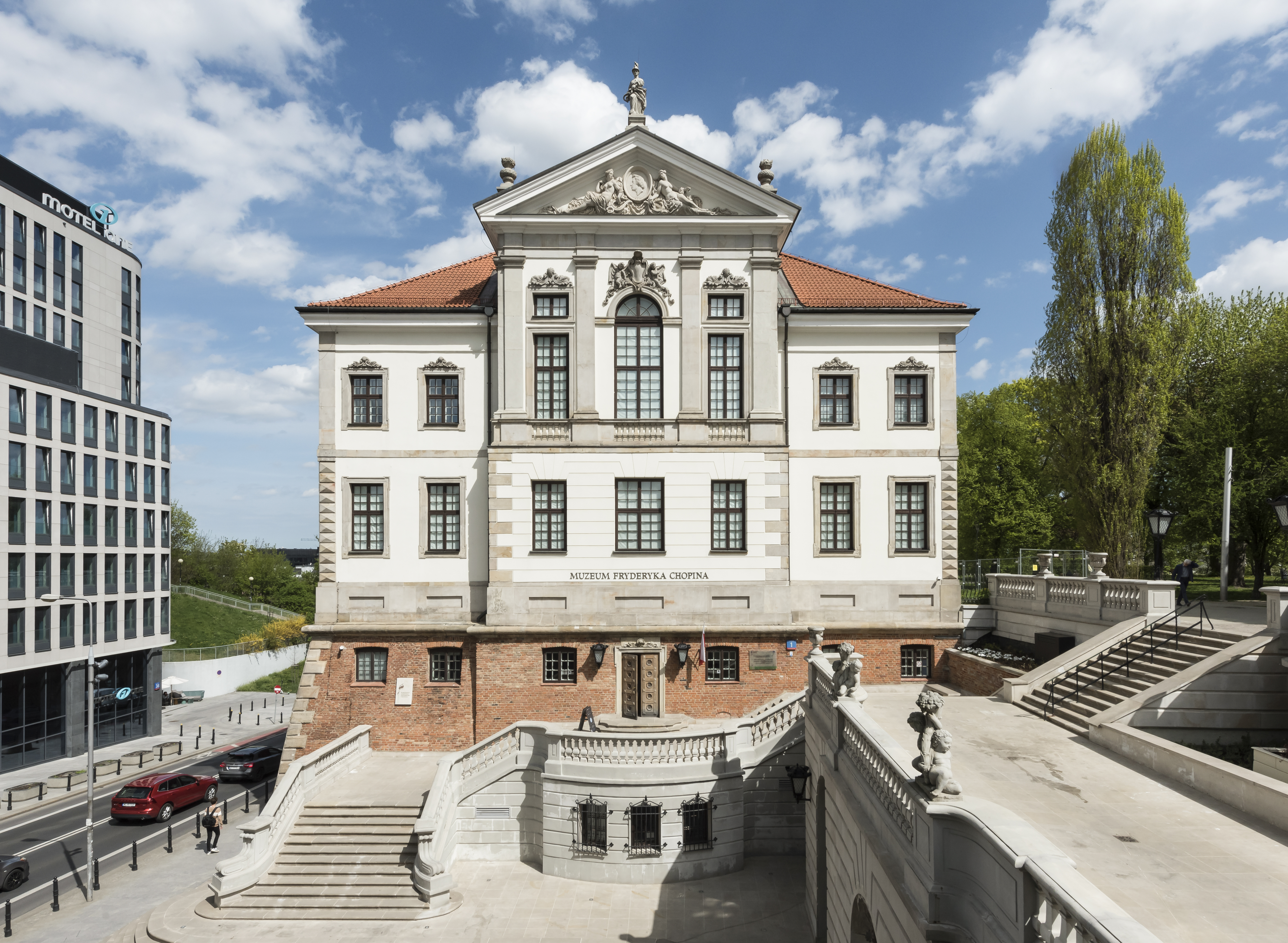
- Ostrogski Castle
- Interactive map of the Ostrogski Palace; Pałac Ostrogskich (in Polish) area

General information
- Architectural style: Baroque
- Location: Warsaw, Poland
- Construction started: after 1681
- Demolished: 1944

Design and construction
- Architect: Tylman Gamerski

Historic Monument of Poland
- Designated: 1994-09-08
- Part of: Warsaw – historic city center with the Royal Route and Wilanów
- Reference no.: M.P. 1994 nr 50 poz. 423

Ostrogski Palace, or Ostrogski Castle (Polish: Pałac Ostrogskich, or Zamek Ostrogskich), is a fortified mansion in the city center of Warsaw, Poland, on Tamka Street. The castle was originally constructed for the powerful Ostrogski family in the 17th century. It currently houses the Fryderyk Chopin Society and the Fryderyk Chopin Museum.

== History ==
The spot for the palace, a large lot of land on the Vistula escarpment directly below the Nowy Świat, was bought by Prince Janusz Ostrogski in early 17th century. As the area had been still a suburb of Warsaw and exempted from the laws of the city which prevented the inhabitants from building private fortifications, Ostrogski decided to build a small castle there. For that he financed a bastion on which the manor was to be constructed. However, it was not until after his death that the manor itself was started. Designed by Tylman of Gameren, the palace built on top of the bastion was to become one of the wings of a huge future palace. However, it was never completed and was bought by deputy chancellor of the crown Jan Gniński, who turned it into his seat.

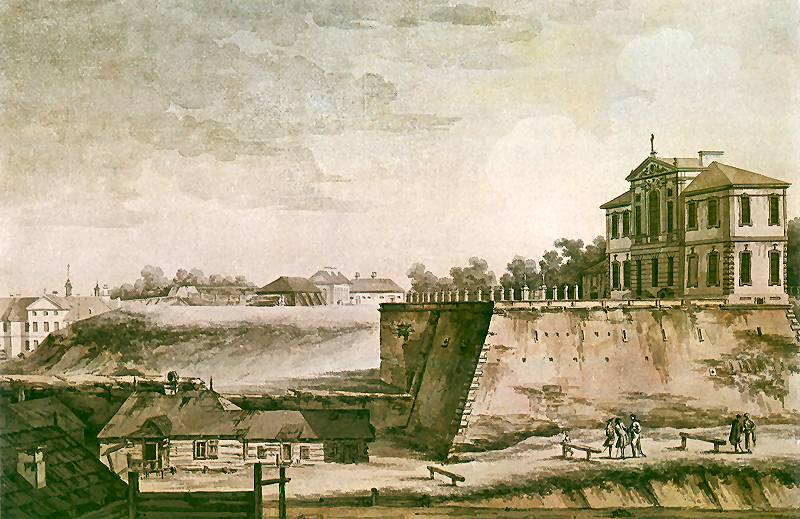
18th-century painting

In 1725 the palace was bought by yet another magnate family, the Zamoyski, who made it a seat of their jurydyka. However, as the unfinished manor lacked many features of an 18th-century magnate palace, it never served its original purpose and with time became neglected. Since 1778 it was divided onto small flats and started serving as a hostel for students, owned by Marcin Nikuta. Converted into a military hospital by the French in 1806, between 1812 and 1817 it was abandoned and gradually fell into disrepair. During the November Uprising it was bought by the Polish government and refurbished to become a military hospital once again. Turned over to civilian authorities in 1836, it continued to be a hospital until 1859, when it was bought by the Musical Institute. It was there that both Stanisław Moniuszko and Ignacy Jan Paderewski received their education. In late 19th century an additional story was added and in 1913 a new, much larger seat for the institute was built adjacent to the palace.

Destroyed by the Germans in the effect of the Warsaw Uprising of 1944, the building had been rebuilt by Mieczysław Kuzma between 1949 and 1954, while the ruins of the 1913 construction were demolished. Since then it has housed the Fryderyk Chopin Society.

The cellars below the bastion are supposedly home to a Golden Duck, a mythical creature from one of Warsaw's legends.

== Chopin Museum ==
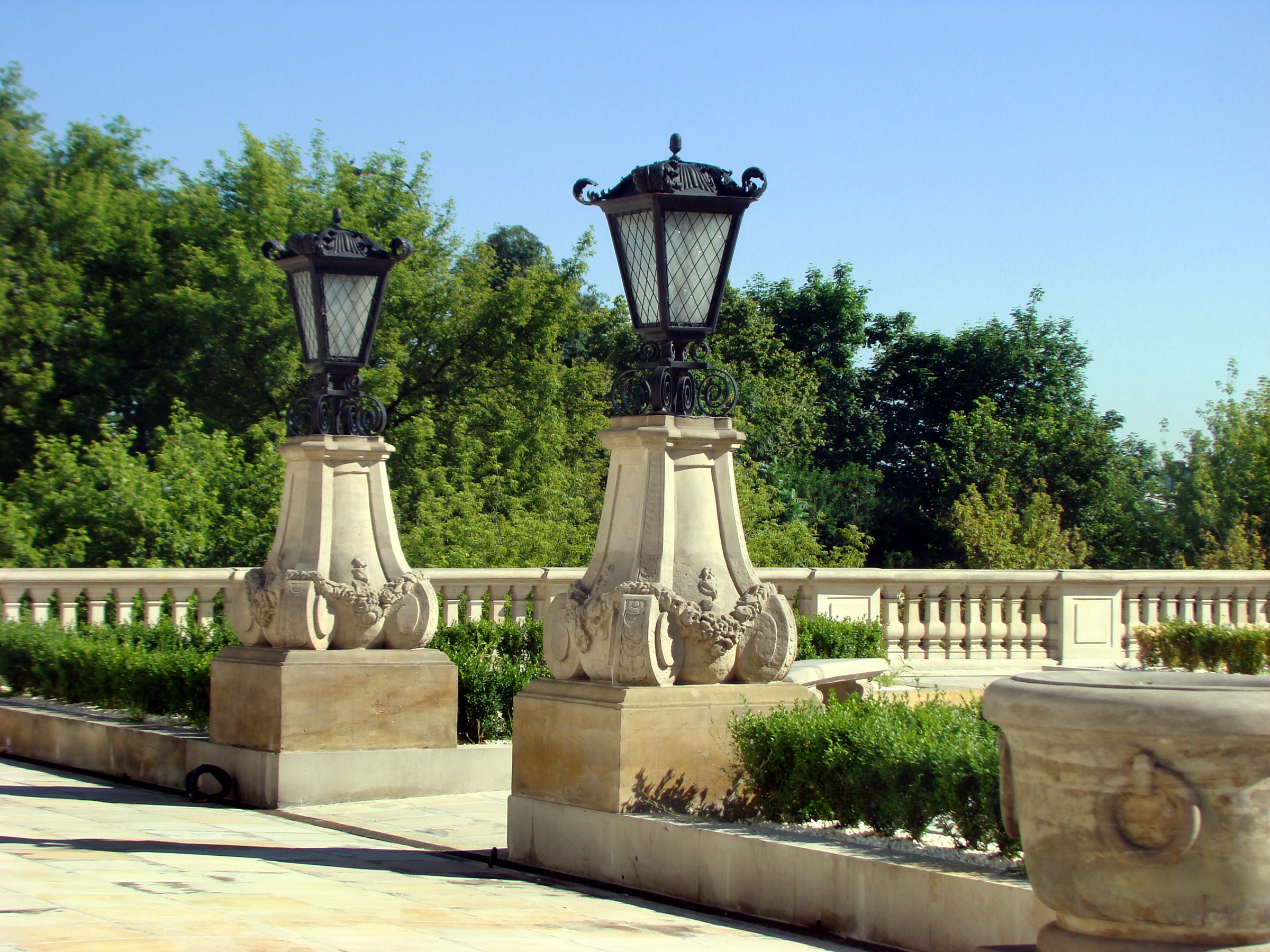
Castle grounds

The Fryderyk Chopin Museum at the Fryderyk Chopin Society in Warsaw was established in the 1930s. At that time, thirteen valuable manuscripts were purchased from Ludwika Ciechomska, granddaughter of Ludwika Jędrzejewicz, Chopin's sister, and Bogusław Kraszewski. The creation of a Collection of Photographs, Recordings and a Library was started prior to 1939.

In 1945, the Fryderyk Chopin Institute opened again in Warsaw, and was housed at first in Zgoda Street and from 1953 in Ostrogski Castle. This was also the home of the museum, Library and Collections of Photographs and Recordings. The museum covers the history and works Chopin, including original manuscripts and documents written by the composer, photographs and sculptures of him, letters, as well as hosting piano recitals and competitions of Chopin's works. The rich plafonds, stucco and Pompeian style frescoes are a fitting setting for the rooms of the Fryderyk Chopin Museum.

== See also ==
- Castles in Poland
