= Fryderyk Chopin Museum =

Coordinates: 52°14′11″N 21°01′23″E

Fryderyk Chopin Museum Ostrogski Palace

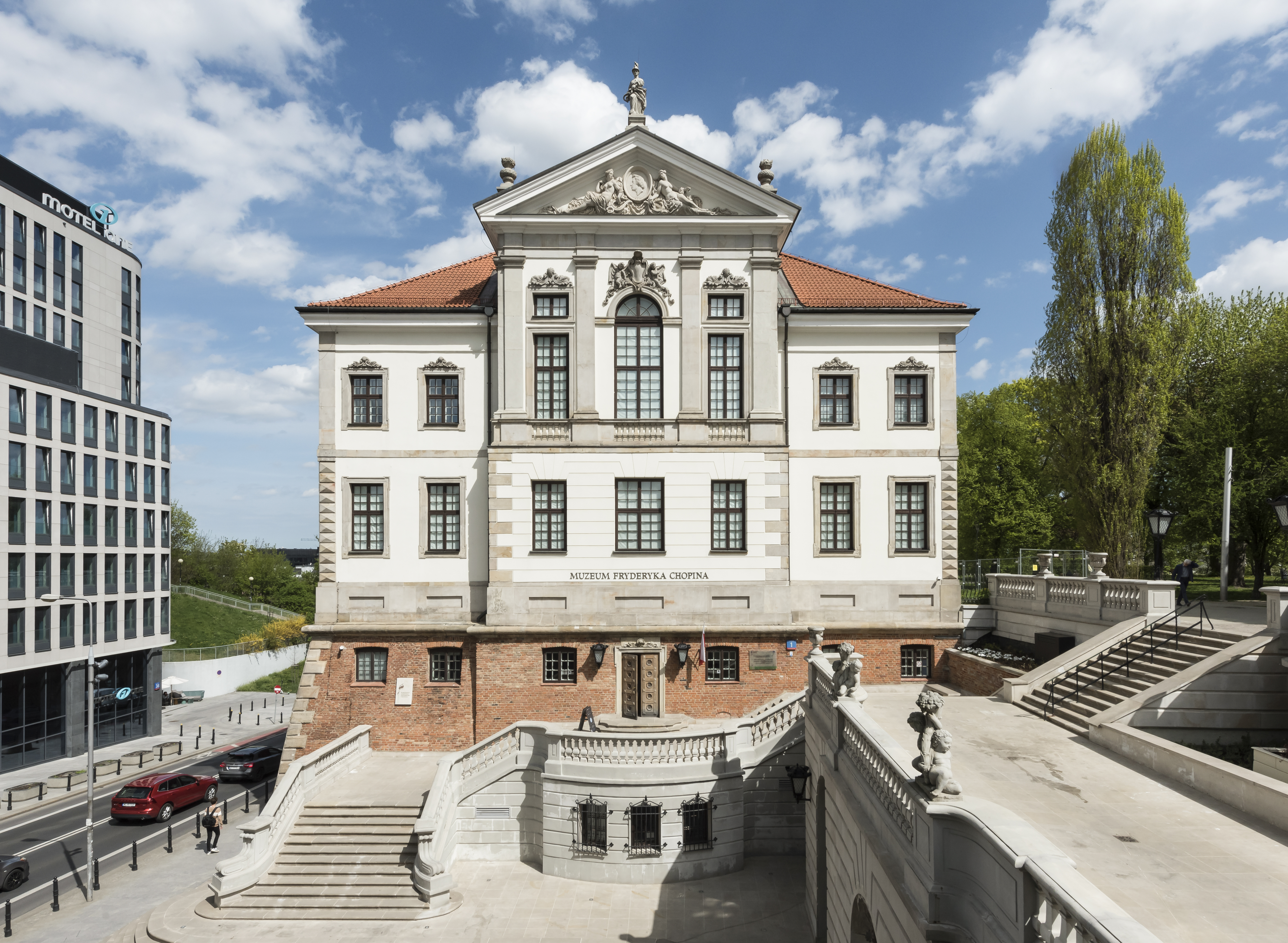
- Established: 1954
- Location: 1 Okólnik Street; Warsaw, Poland
- Type: Biographical museum
- Curator: Maciej Janicki
- Public transit access: Nowy Świat-Uniwersytet; Ordynacka 02
- Website: chopin.museum/pl

The Fryderyk Chopin Museum (Polish: Muzeum Fryderyka Chopina) is a museum in Warsaw, Poland, established in 1954 and dedicated to Polish composer Frédéric Chopin. Since 2005, the museum has been operated by the Fryderyk Chopin Institute.

A department of the museum is the Birthplace of Frédéric Chopin at Żelazowa Wola. The museum also operated the Chopin family parlor on Krakowskie Przedmieście, in Warsaw, until the parlor's closure in 2014.

== History ==
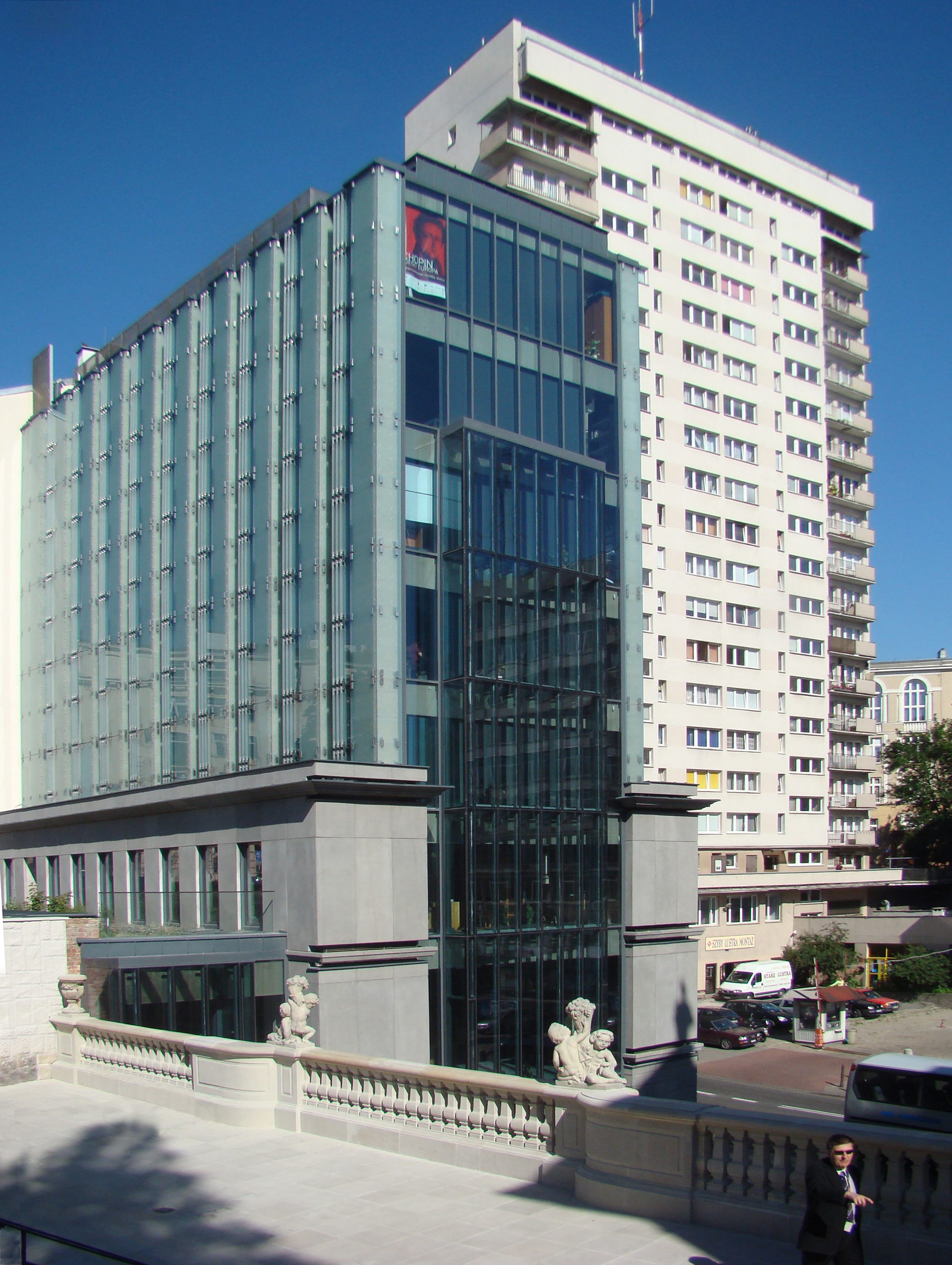
New building of Chopin Institute, seen from Ostrogski Palace terrace

The Fryderyk Chopin Museum at the Fryderyk Chopin Society in Warsaw was established in the 1930s. Already in 1935, the Fryderyk Chopin Institute, established a year earlier by 32 outstanding representatives of the world of culture and politics, headed by Karol Szymanowski, Józef Beck and August Zaleski, had begun amassing a collection. At that time, thirteen extremely valuable manuscripts were purchased from Ludwika Ciechomska, granddaughter of Ludwika Jędrzejewicz, Chopin's sister, and Bogusław Kraszewski. The manuscripts included: a complete autograph of the G minor Trio op. 8 for piano, violin and cello by Chopin, seven letters written at Szafarnia by the young composer to his family in 1824 (including four examples of the famous Szafarnia Courier) and at Kowalewo (6 July 1827) as well as to his school friend Julian Fontana in Paris (1835), three special greetings addressed by Chopin to his father (6 December 1816 and 1818) and mother (16 June 1817) upon their name days as well as two dedications of 6 and 9 June 1833 for Józef Nowakowski, a friend from the Warsaw Conservatory. The creation of a Collection of Photographs, Recordings and a Library was started prior to 1939.

In 1945 the Fryderyk Chopin Institute reopened, on Warsaw's Zgoda Street, and since 1953 has been housed in the Ostrogski Palace. This is also the home of the Fryderyk Chopin Museum, Library and Collections of Photographs and Recordings. The museum covers the history and works of Chopin and includes original manuscripts and documents written by the composer, photographs and sculptures of him, and letters. It also hosts piano recitals and competitions of Chopin's works. The rich plafonds, stucco and Pompeian style frescoes are a fitting setting for the rooms of the Fryderyk Chopin Museum.

Refurbished for the 200th anniversary (2010) of Frédéric Chopin's birth, this multimedia museum is one of the most modern museums in Poland. Its collections are displayed on five levels of exhibition space in 15 rooms.

The museum is the result of an international competition for the ideation and realization of the new permanent exhibition design of the museum. Held under the patronage of the Minister of Culture Bogdan Zdrojewski and National Heritage, the studio Migliore+Servetto Architects won the permanent exhibitions project in 2008, among 32 international firms, and designed the permanent exhibition.

== Gallery ==
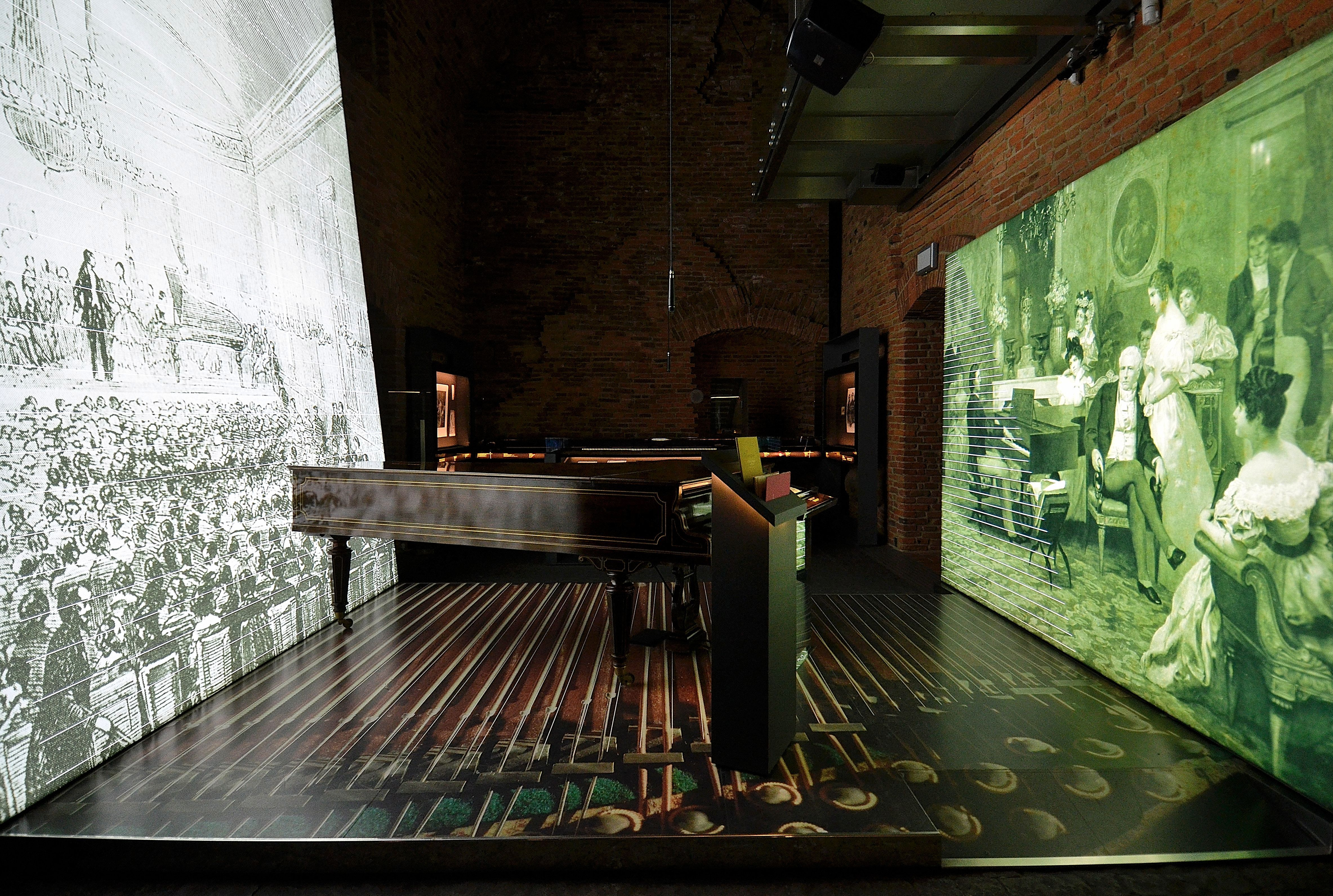
Level Minus-1

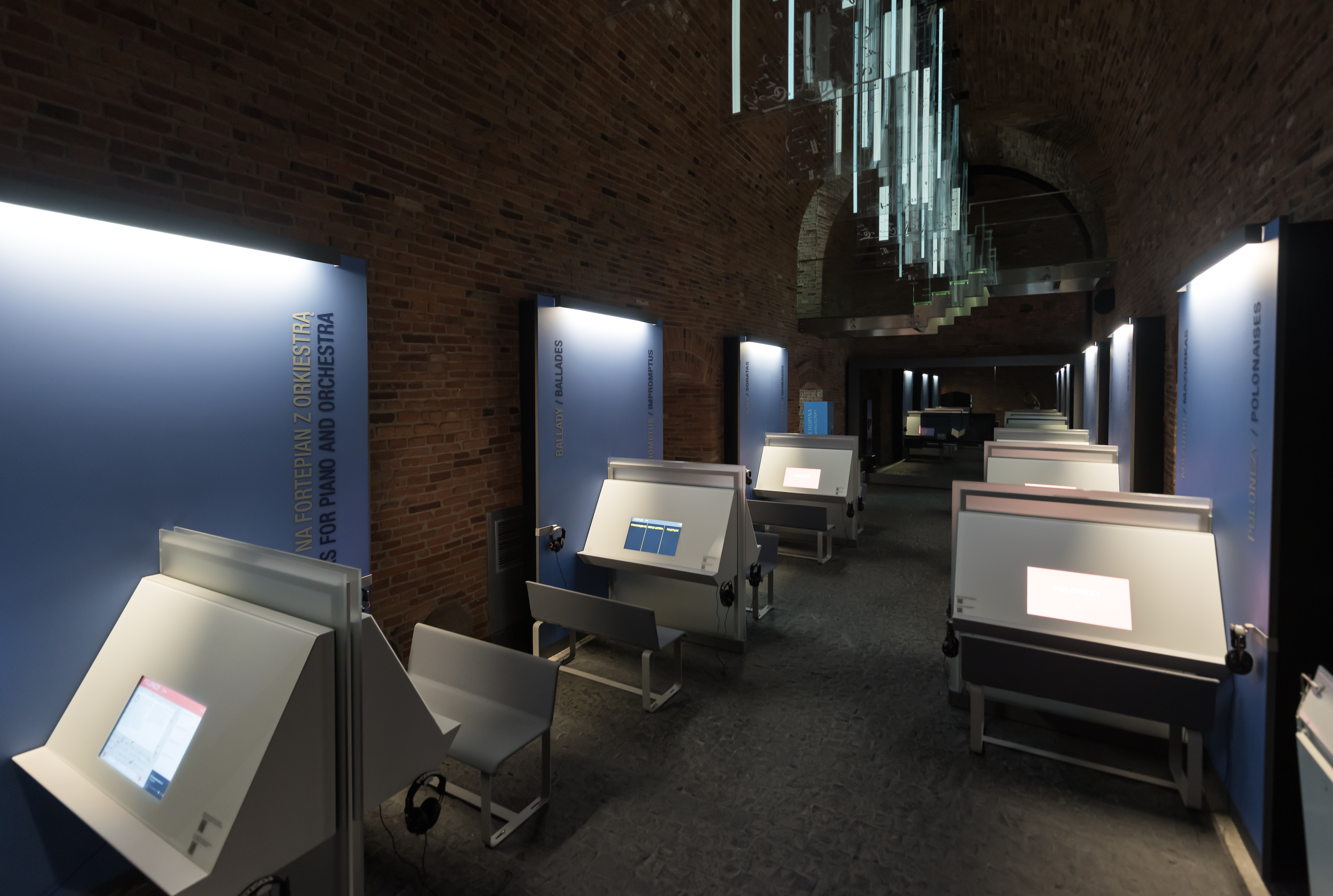
Audio room

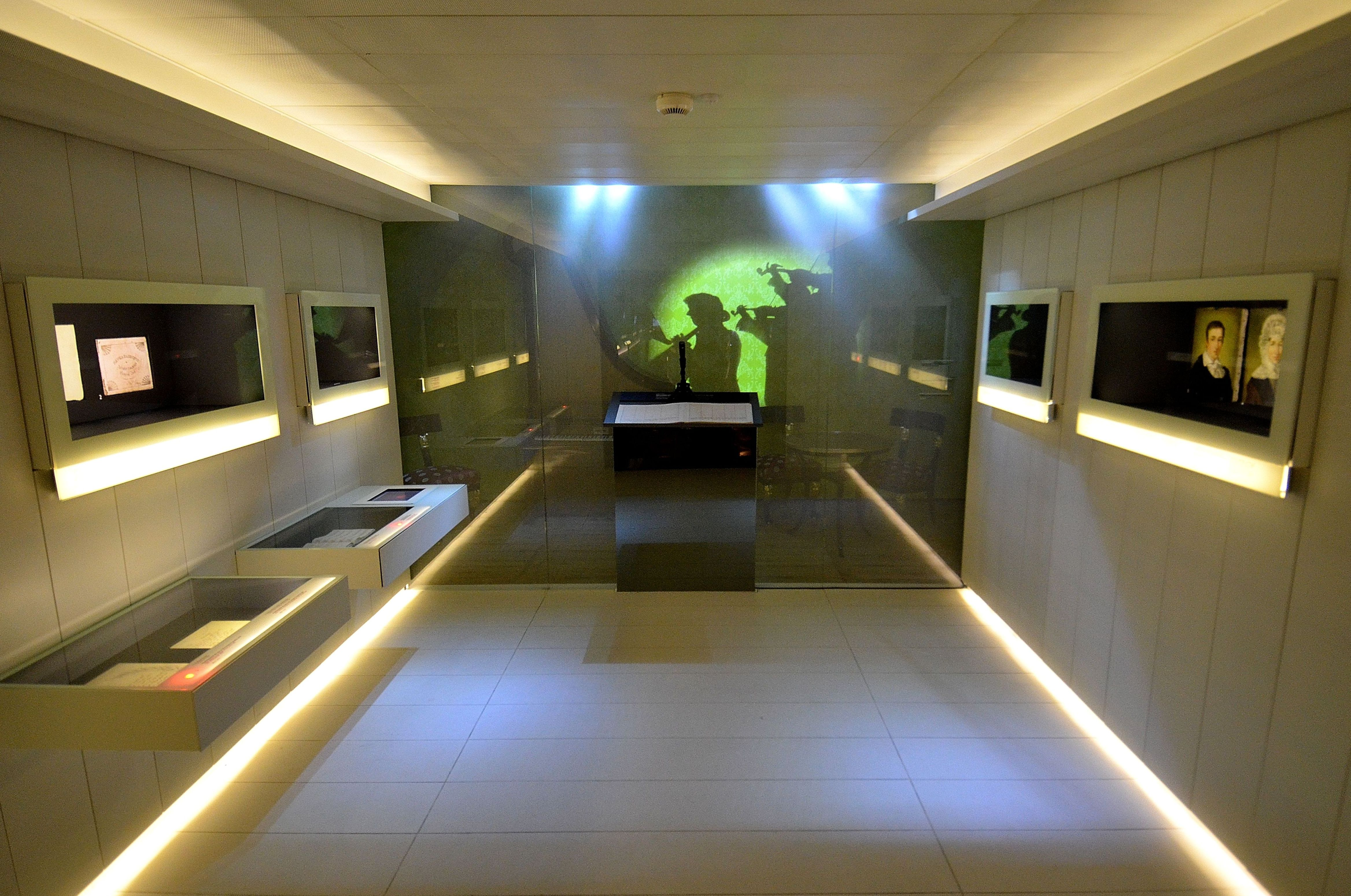
Level 0

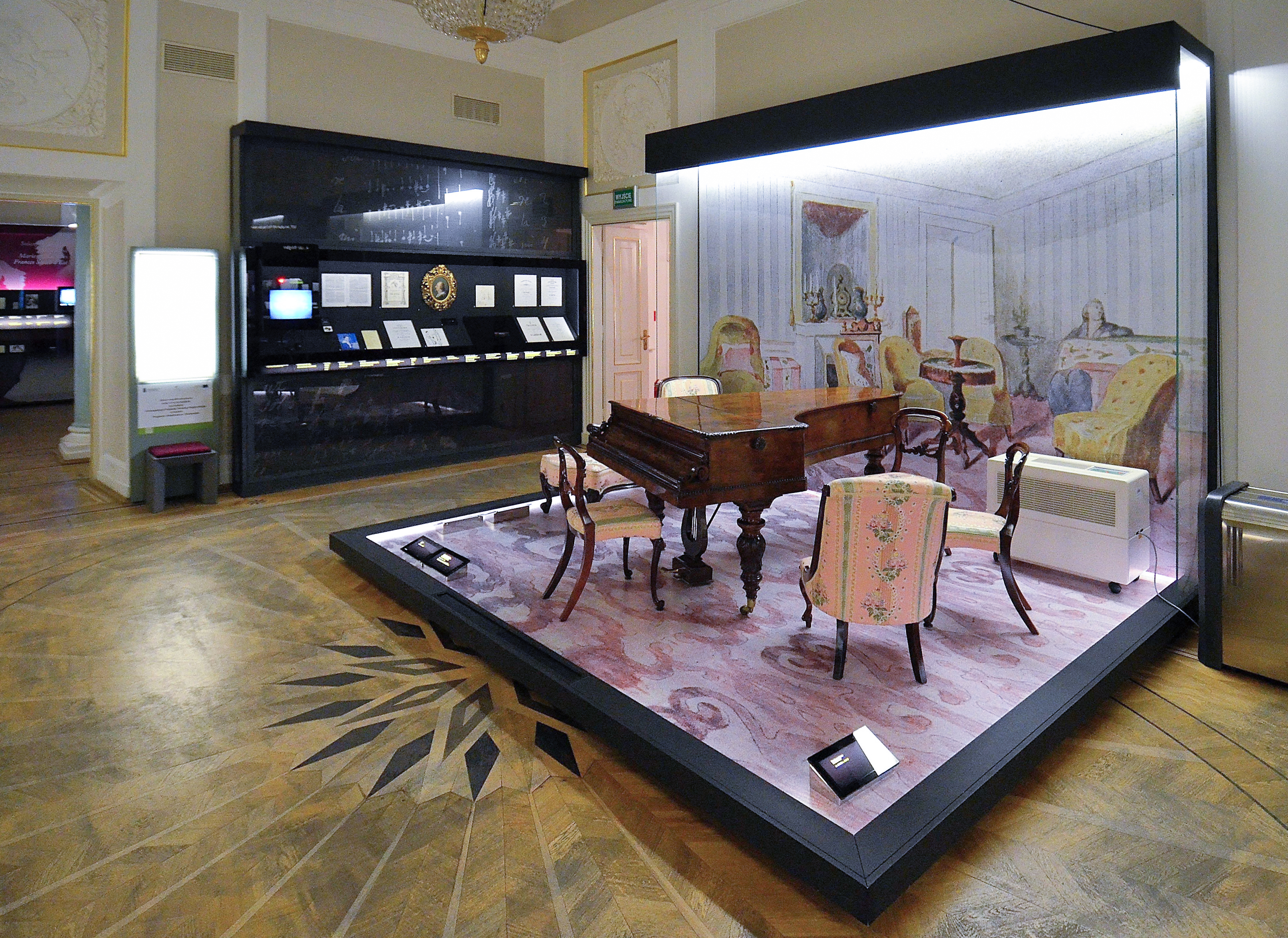
Chopin's last piano

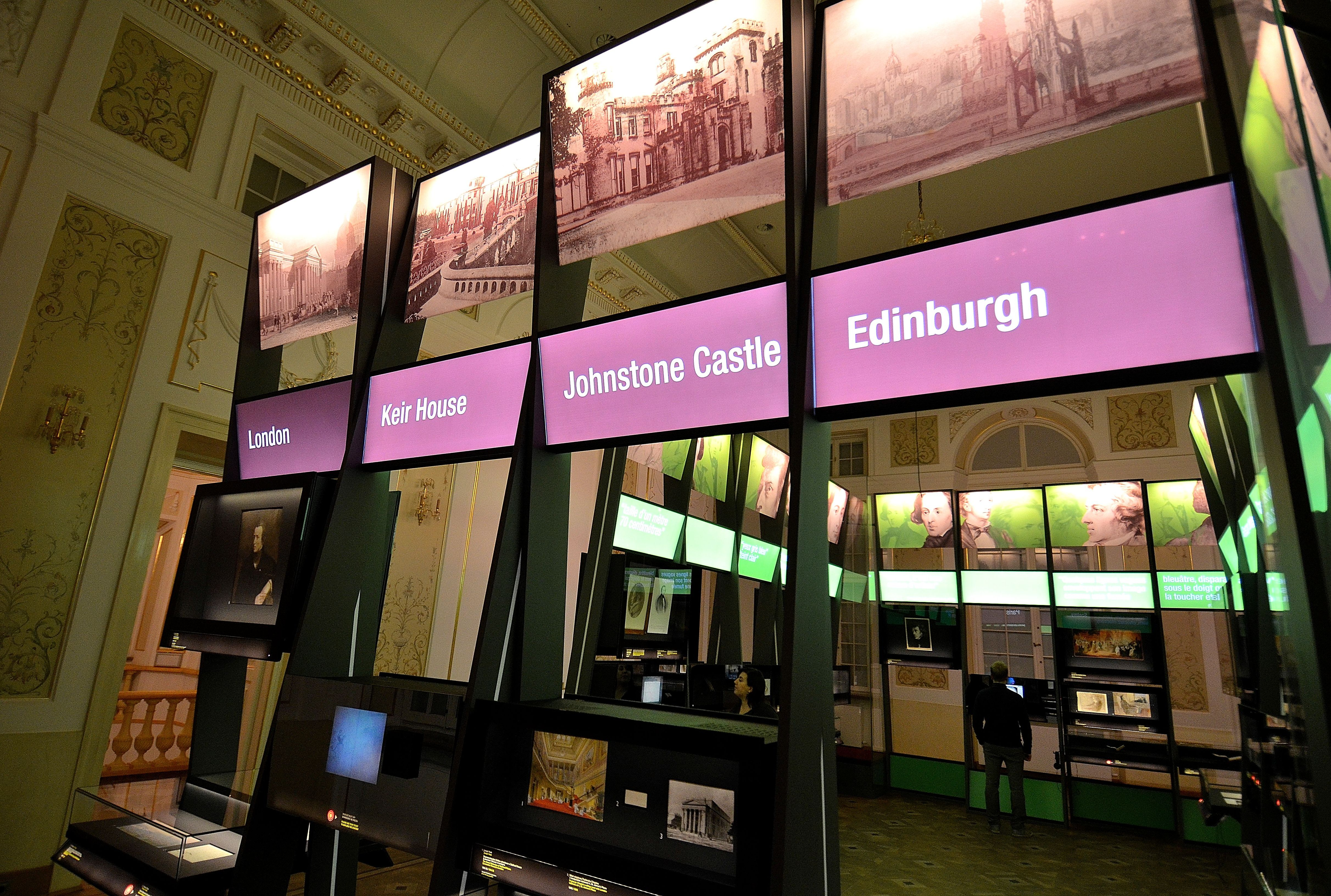
Chopin's travels (level 2)

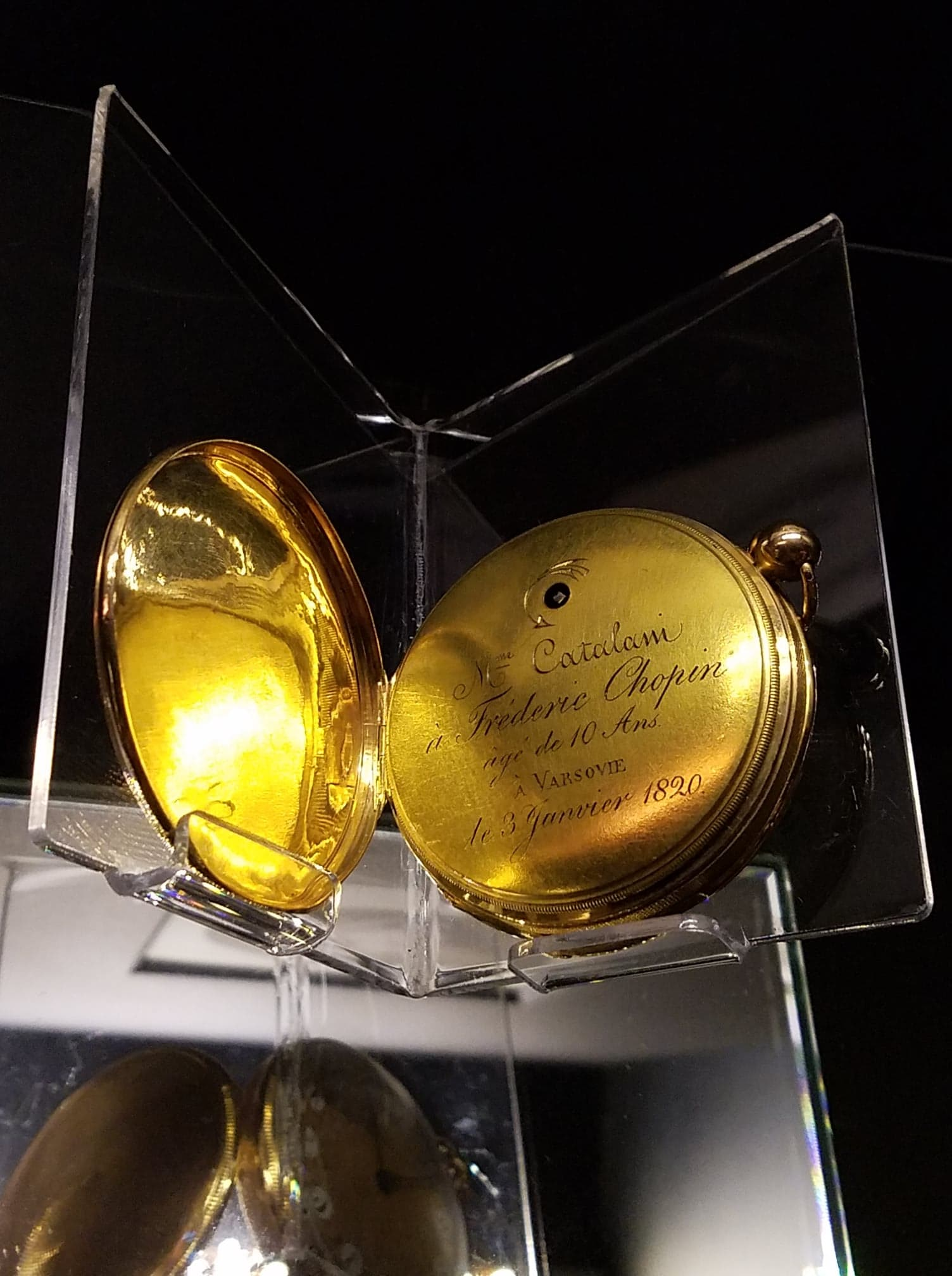
Pocket watch presented by Angelica Catalani to the 10-year-old Chopin on January 3, 1820

== See also ==
- List of music museums
