= Piano Concerto No. 1 (Chopin) =

Piano concerto by Frédéric Chopin

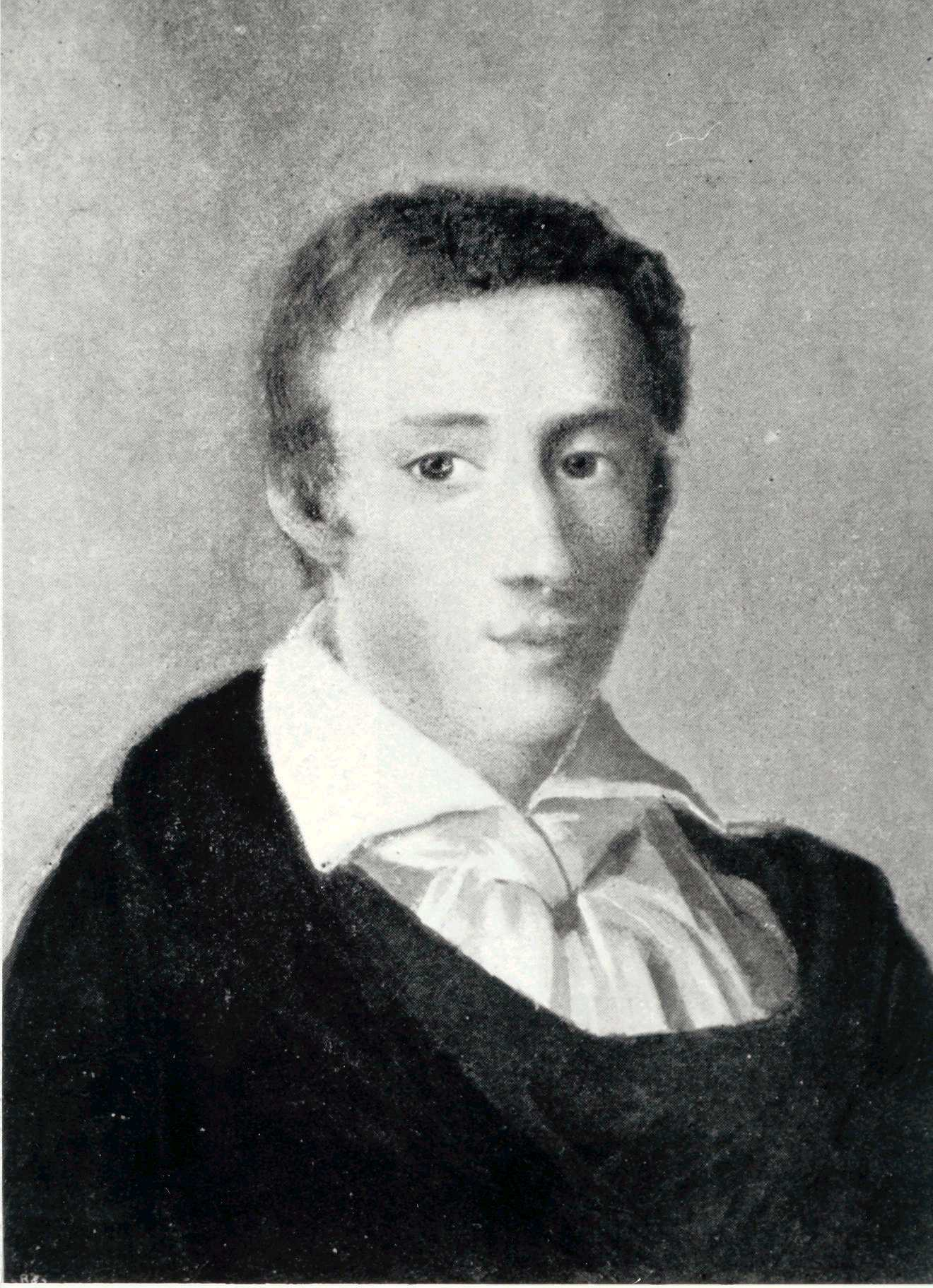
Painting of Chopin by Ambroży Mieroszewski in 1829

The Piano Concerto No. 1 in E minor, Op. 11, is a piano concerto written by Frédéric Chopin in 1830, when he was twenty years old. It was first performed on 12 October of that year, at the Teatr Narodowy (the National Theatre) in Warsaw, Poland, with the composer as soloist, during one of his "farewell" concerts before leaving Poland.

It was the first of Chopin's two piano concertos to be published, and was therefore given the designation of Piano Concerto "No. 1" at the time of publication, even though it was actually written immediately after the premiere of what was later published as Piano Concerto No. 2.

The concerto is scored for solo piano, pairs of flutes, oboes, clarinets, and bassoons, four horns, two trumpets, bass trombone, timpani, and strings. A typical performance lasts about 40 minutes.

== Influences ==
The piano concerto is dedicated to Friedrich Kalkbrenner, a pianist and composer whose playing Chopin admired. Another influence is apparently Johann Nepomuk Hummel. Harold C. Schonberg, in The Great Pianists, writes "...the openings of the Hummel A minor and Chopin E minor concertos are too close to be coincidental".

While composing it, Chopin wrote to his friend Tytus Woyciechowski, saying "Here you doubtless observe my tendency to do wrong against my will. As something has involuntarily crept into my head through my eyes, I love to indulge it, even though it may be all wrong". This sight may have been the well-known soprano Konstancja Gładkowska, believed by some to be the "ideal" behind the Larghetto from Chopin's Second Piano Concerto, although some believe Chopin may have been referring to Woyciechowski.

== Premiere and critical reception ==
The Theatre where Chopin premiered his concerto

The premiere, on 11 October 1830, was "a success.... a full house". According to the Kurier Warszawski, there was "an audience of about 700". The concerto was premiered with Chopin himself at the piano and Carlo Evasio Soliva conducting. The piece was followed by "thunderous applause". Seven weeks later, in Paris, following the political outbreaks in Poland, Chopin played his concerto for the first time in France at the Salle Pleyel. It was received well, once again. François-Joseph Fétis wrote in La Revue musicale the next day that "There is spirit in these melodies, there is fantasy in these passages, and everywhere there is originality".

Opinions of the concerto differ. Some critics feel that the orchestral support as written is dry and uninteresting, for example the critic James Huneker, who wrote in Chopin: The Man and his Music that it was "not Chopin at his very best". Sometimes musicians such as Mikhail Pletnev feel a need to amend Chopin's orchestration. On the other hand, many others feel that the orchestral backing is carefully and deliberately written to fit in with the sound of the piano, and that the simplicity of arrangement is in deliberate contrast to the complexity of the harmony. It has been suggested that the orchestral writing is reminiscent of Hummel's concertos in giving support to the piano rather than providing drama. However, Robert Schumann took a rather different view when he reviewed Chopin's concerti in 1836 for the Neue Zeitschrift für Musik, stating that "Chopin introduces the spirit of Beethoven into the concert hall" with these pieces.

== Structure ==
I. Allegro maestoso

II. Romanze – Larghetto

III. Rondo – Vivace
performed by Arthur Rubinstein, Sir John Barbirolli and the London Symphony Orchestra

The concerto comprises three movements, typical of instrumental concertos of the period:

1. Allegro maestoso (E minor)
2. Romanze – Larghetto (E major)
3. Rondo – Vivace (E major)

A typical performance lasts around 38 to 42 minutes.

=== I. Allegro maestoso ===
Both the first and second movements feature unusual modulations; in the opening Allegro, the exposition modulates to the parallel major, i-I, instead of the expected i-III. This tonal relation (i-III) between the second and the third theme finally occurs in the recapitulation, where an actual i-I modulation would have been expected, producing a different effect. Chopin utilizes the same effect in other early works, the Piano Sonata No. 1 and the Piano Trio in G minor.

The first movement of the E minor concerto has three themes, which are introduced by the orchestra. The piano then plays the first theme (bar 139), followed by the lyrical second theme (bar 155), accompanied by the main motif of the first theme in bass counterpoint. The third theme is in E major, introduced in the exposition by the orchestra and taken over by the piano (bar 222). The development begins in bar 385, with the piano opening with the second theme; the orchestra then develops the first theme.

The recapitulation begins in bar 486 again with the orchestra playing its opening theme. The third E major theme comes back (bar 573), except this time in G major (i-III), but eventually, the coda reverts back to E minor, and the movement ends with a piano section, followed by a sudden forte E minor chord at the end.

=== II. Romanze – Larghetto ===
The Romanze, although not strictly in sonata form, has its second theme of the exposition ascribe to the classical model of modulating to the dominant (I-V), and, when it returns, it modulates to the mediant (III). Chopin wrote in the same letter to Tytus, saying "It is not meant to create a powerful effect; it is rather a Romance, calm and melancholy, giving the impression of someone looking gently towards a spot that calls to mind a thousand happy memories. It is a kind of reverie in the moonlight on a beautiful spring evening". The second movement has been described as "unashamedly heart-on-your-sleeve stuff".

=== III. Rondo – Vivace ===
Written with much procrastination, hesitation, and difficulty, the third movement features Krakowiak rhythms, a syncopated, duple-time popular dance in contemporary Kraków. It became one of the last pieces written by Chopin before the political turmoil in Poland that prevented him from returning. After completing the Rondo in August 1830, he played it privately—first with a string quartet and then a small orchestral ensemble.

== Cultural legacy ==
The 1976 film The Little Girl Who Lives Down The Lane featured the concerto, performed by pianist Claudio Arrau and the London Philharmonic Orchestra. It is performed by one of the six finalists in the 1980 film The Competition. A performance of the concerto also features prominently in the 2015 British film The Lady in the Van. Part of the first movement is featured in the 1942 film The Lady is Willing, when Fred MacMurray awakens Marlene Dietrich with his midnight piano playing.

The second movement is featured at the climax of Don Hertzfeldt's 2012 film It's Such a Beautiful Day; it is also featured in the 1998 film The Truman Show and its soundtrack.

== Recordings ==
Conductor	Ensemble	Pianist	Piano	Label	Recording year
Paul Kletzki	The Philharmonia Orchestra	Maurizio Pollini	-	HMV	1960
Claudio Abbado	London Symphony Orchestra	Martha Argerich	-	Deutsche Grammophon	1968
Carlo Maria Giulini	Los Angeles Philharmonic Orchestra	Krystian Zimerman	-	Deutsche Grammophon	1978
Charles Mackerras	Orchestra of the Age of Enlightenment	Emanuel Ax	Erard (1851)	Sony Classical	1998
-	Quatuor Cambini-Paris (version for piano and string quintet)	David Lively	Erard (1836)	Aparté	2016
-	-	Dina Yoffe (version for solo piano)	Erard (1838)	Fryderyk Chopin Institute	
Frans Brüggen	Orchestra of the Eighteenth Century	Dang Thai Son	Erard (1849)	Fryderyk Chopin Institute	2005
Christoph Spering	Das Neue Orchester	Janusz Olejniczak	Erard	Opus 111	
François-Xavier Roth	Les Siècles	Denis Pascal	Pleyel	Polymnie	2005
Riccardo Minasi	La Scintilla Orchestra	Margarita Höhenrieder	Pleyel	Solo Musica	2022

== See also ==
- Piano Concerto No. 2 (Chopin)
