= Piano Concerto No. 2 (Chopin) =

1829 piano concerto composed by Frédéric Chopin

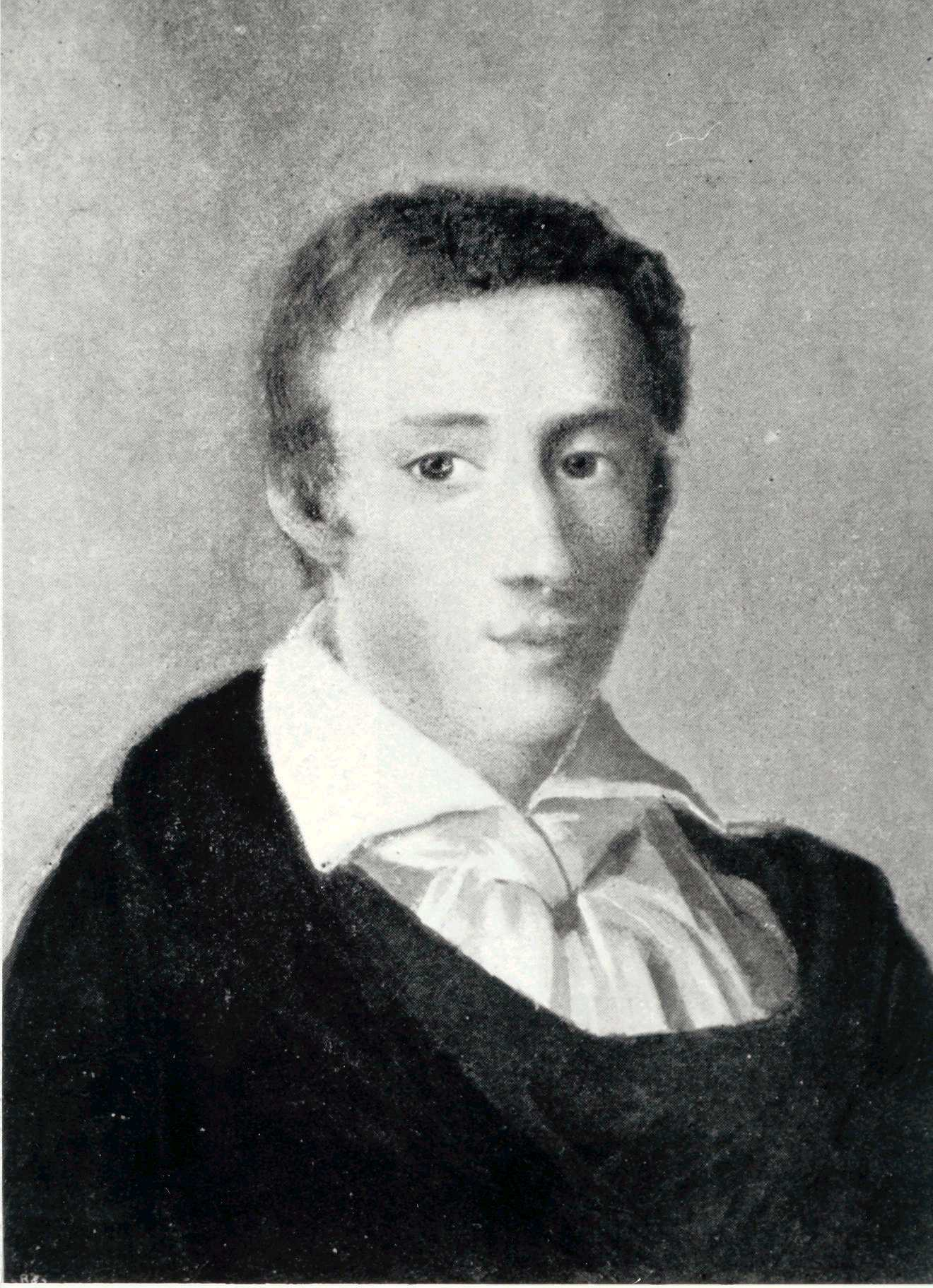
Chopin in 1829

The Piano Concerto No. 2 in F minor, Op. 21, is a piano concerto composed by Frédéric Chopin in the fall of 1829. Chopin composed the piece before he had finished his formal education, at around 20 years of age. It was first performed on 17 March 1830, in Warsaw, Poland, with the composer as soloist. It was the second of his piano concertos to be published (after the Piano Concerto No. 1), and so was designated as "No. 2", even though it was written first.

Since May 2024, a score from the collection of the National Library of Poland, where a piano part is in Chopin's own hand, has been presented at a permanent exhibition in the Palace of the Commonwealth.

== Music ==
I. Maestoso

II. Larghetto

III. Allegro vivace
performed by Neal O'Doan, Nico Snel, and the Seattle Philharmonic

The work contains the three movements typical of instrumental concertos of the period:

1. Maestoso (F minor)
2. Larghetto (A♭ major)
3. Allegro vivace (F minor – F major)

A typical performance lasts around 30 to 35 minutes.

=== I. Maestoso ===
The opening theme is shown.

=== II. Larghetto ===
A work of "undescribable beauty", this nocturnal movement is said to have been inspired by Chopin's distant idolization of Konstancja Gładkowska or of Tytus Woyciechowski. The main theme (the "A" section) is introduced by the piano after an orchestral introduction and is later repeated twice and again, at measure 82 (the start of the coda), is enhanced by the sublime entrance of the bassoon in canon, followed by the bassoon transitioning to a counter-melody.

=== III. Allegro vivace ===
The virtuosic finale is in rondo form. The violins and violas are at one point instructed to play col legno (with the wood of the bow). For the piano, the final sections are regarded as extremely technically demanding.

== Orchestration ==
Chopin's fellow composers and Prof. Elsner's former students, Ignacy Feliks Dobrzyński (1807-1867) and Tomasz Nidecki (1807-1852), are believed to have helped him orchestrate his piano concertos. This gave an excuse for other musicians to make slight alterations in the score.

Alfred Cortot created his own orchestration of the F minor concerto and recorded it with the London Philharmonic Orchestra under John Barbirolli in 1935. Ingolf Wunder recorded Alfred Cortot's orchestration with minor changes done by himself in 2015. More recently (in 2017), Mikhail Pletnev recorded his arrangements of both of Chopin's piano concertos, conducting the Mahler Chamber Orchestra, with pianist Daniil Trifonov.

== Recordings ==
The concerto has been recorded by, among others, Artur Rubinstein, Martha Argerich, Alfred Cortot, Witold Małcużyński, Clara Haskil, Alexis Weissenberg, Bella Davidovich, András Schiff, Lise de la Salle, Alexander Lonquich, Christopher Warren-Green, Maria João Pires, Nelson Freire, Eldar Nebolsin, Seong-Jon Cho, Krystian Zimerman, Nikolai Lugansky, and Khatia Buniatishvili.
