= Radków (disambiguation) =

Radków may refer to the following places:

- Radków in Lower Silesian Voivodeship (south-west Poland)
- Radków, Lublin Voivodeship (east Poland)
- Radków, Świętokrzyskie Voivodeship (south-central Poland)
