= Waltzes, Op. 70 (Chopin) =

Set of three waltzes composed by Chopin

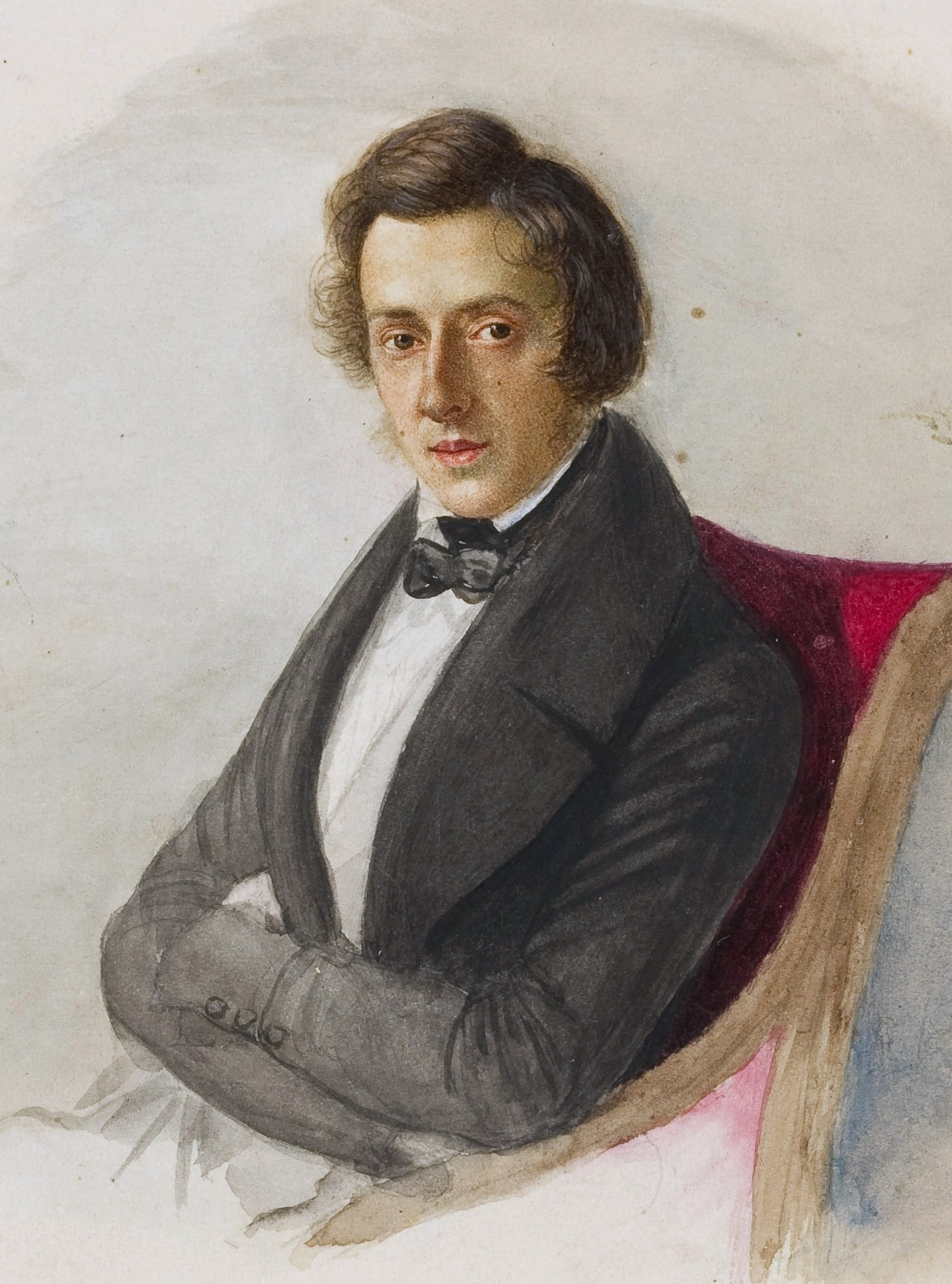
Watercolour of Frédéric Chopin by Maria Wodzińska, 1835

The three Waltzes, Op. 70, were composed by Frédéric Chopin between 1829 and 1842 and were posthumously published by Julian Fontana in 1855, six years after the composer's death. Waltz No. 1 is in G♭ major, No. 2 in F minor and No. 3 in D♭ major. Each of the three waltzes lasts less than three minutes to perform in typical performances.

== Pieces ==
=== No. 1 in G♭ major ===
No. 1
All performances by Olga Gurevich

The Waltz Op. 70, No. 1, in G♭ major was composed in 1832. It is written in the "brilliant style". According to Jeffrey Kallberg, "the unpublished waltzes also capture the joyfulness and glitter of the dance hall and salon, as we can hear in the waltzes in E major, A♭ major [KK IVa/13] (Chopin's only waltz notated in three-eighth metre), and, especially, in G♭ major, Op. 70, No 1."

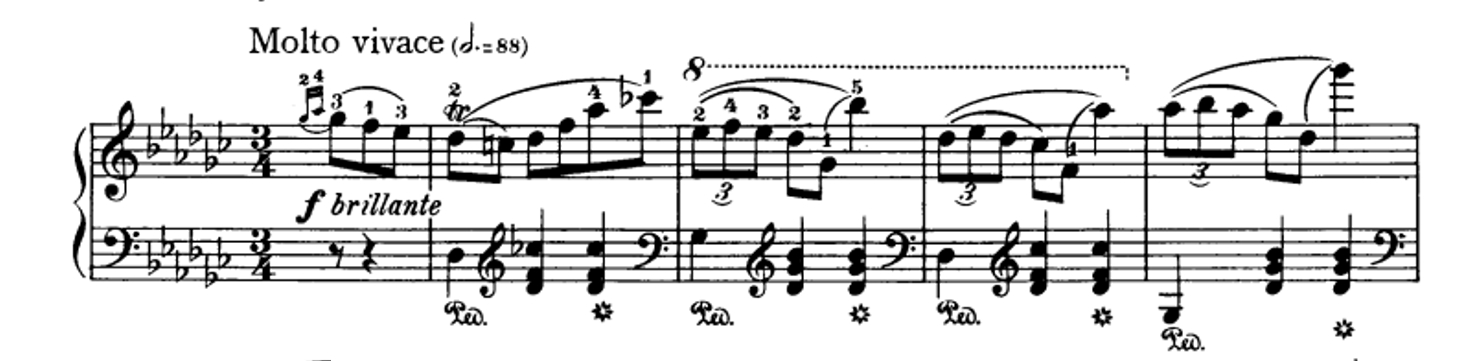

=== No. 2 in F minor ===
No. 2

The waltz Op. 70, No. 2, in F minor was composed in 1842. In December 1842 in Paris, Chopin wrote to Anna Caroline Oury about Op. 70, No. 2: "As for the little waltz which I have had the pleasure of writing for you, I beg you, keep it for yourself: I should not like it to be made public." Chopin, however, dedicated manuscript copies of some of his waltzes to different women dedicatees: in the case of this F minor waltz, there are five different autograph manuscripts and four different women dedicatees.

The Chopin commentator Wilhelm von Lenz wrote: "Although he never had the waltzes [of Op. 70] published, Chopin valued them highly, at least the one in F minor. I often heard him play it, and how incomparably! This nostalgic piece could be entitled Melanconia."

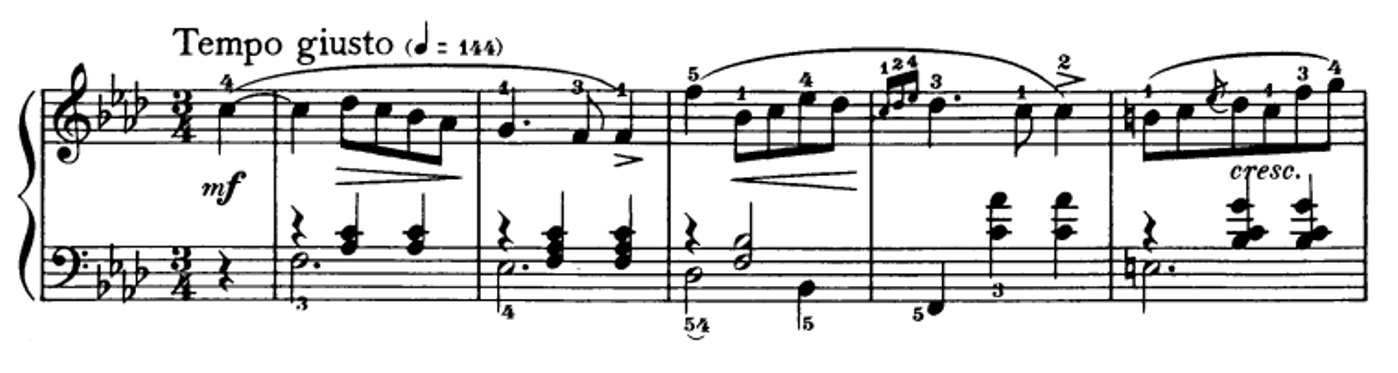

=== No. 3 in D♭ major ===
No. 3

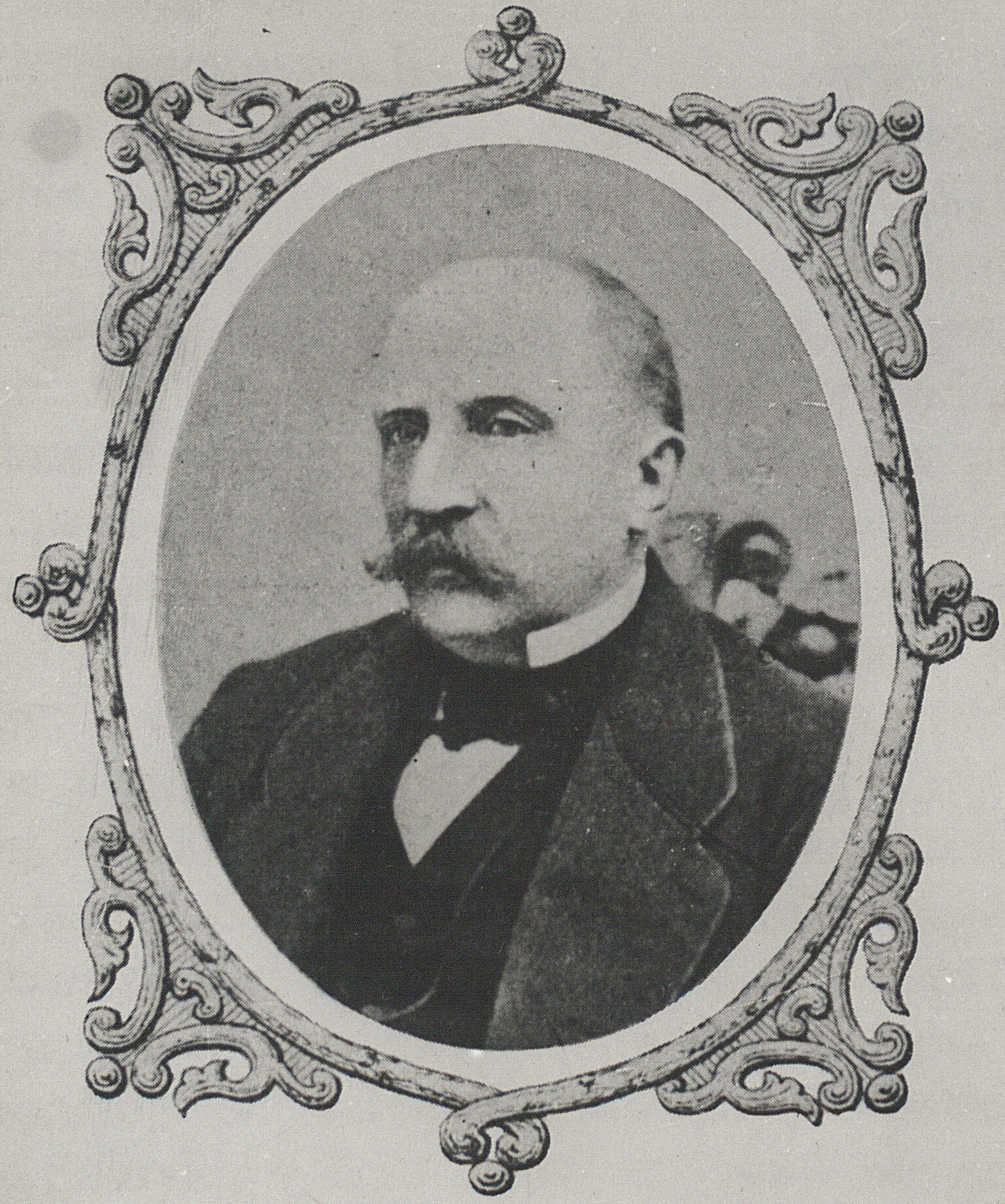
Tytus Woyciechowski

Chopin composed the Waltz Op. 70, No. 3 in D♭ major in 1829 and sent it together with a accompanying letter of 3 October 1829 to his intimate friend Tytus Woyciechowski.

Jeffrey Kallberg suggests: "Two of the waltzes offer unusual, personal testimony of Chopin's amorous sentiments toward women." (The waltzes mentioned by Kallberg are Op. 70 Nr. 3 and the initial version of the Waltz in A♭ major, Op. 69, No. 1, which Chopin 1835 dedicated to Maria Wodzińska and later also to Eliza Peruzzi and Charlotte de Rothschild.)

He continues, "The Waltz in D-flat major, Op. 70, No. 3, dates from Chopin's Warsaw period, and it indexes his nascent romantic life. In a letter to a friend, Chopin confided that the low melody that begins its trio was inspired by his (alas unrequited) crush on the young singer, Konstancja Gładkowska."

Chopin wrote to Woyciechowski:

Take note of one passage marked with a +. No one knows anything about this but you. How sweet it would be for me to play it for you, dearest Tytus. In the trio, the bass line should dominate up to the high E-flat of the upper half of the keyboard in the 5th bar, about which it is unnecessary to write to you, because you feel it. […] Forgive me for sending you the waltz, which perhaps will make you angry at me, but upon my word I wanted to give you pleasure with it, because I love you madly.

— Frédéric Chopin to Tytus Woyciechowski (3.10.1829)

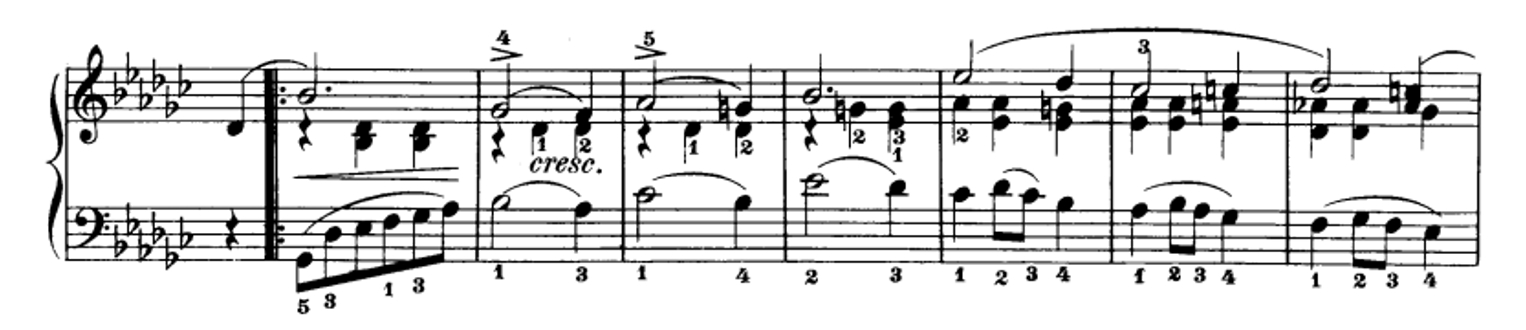
