= Jan Kazimierz Sapieha =

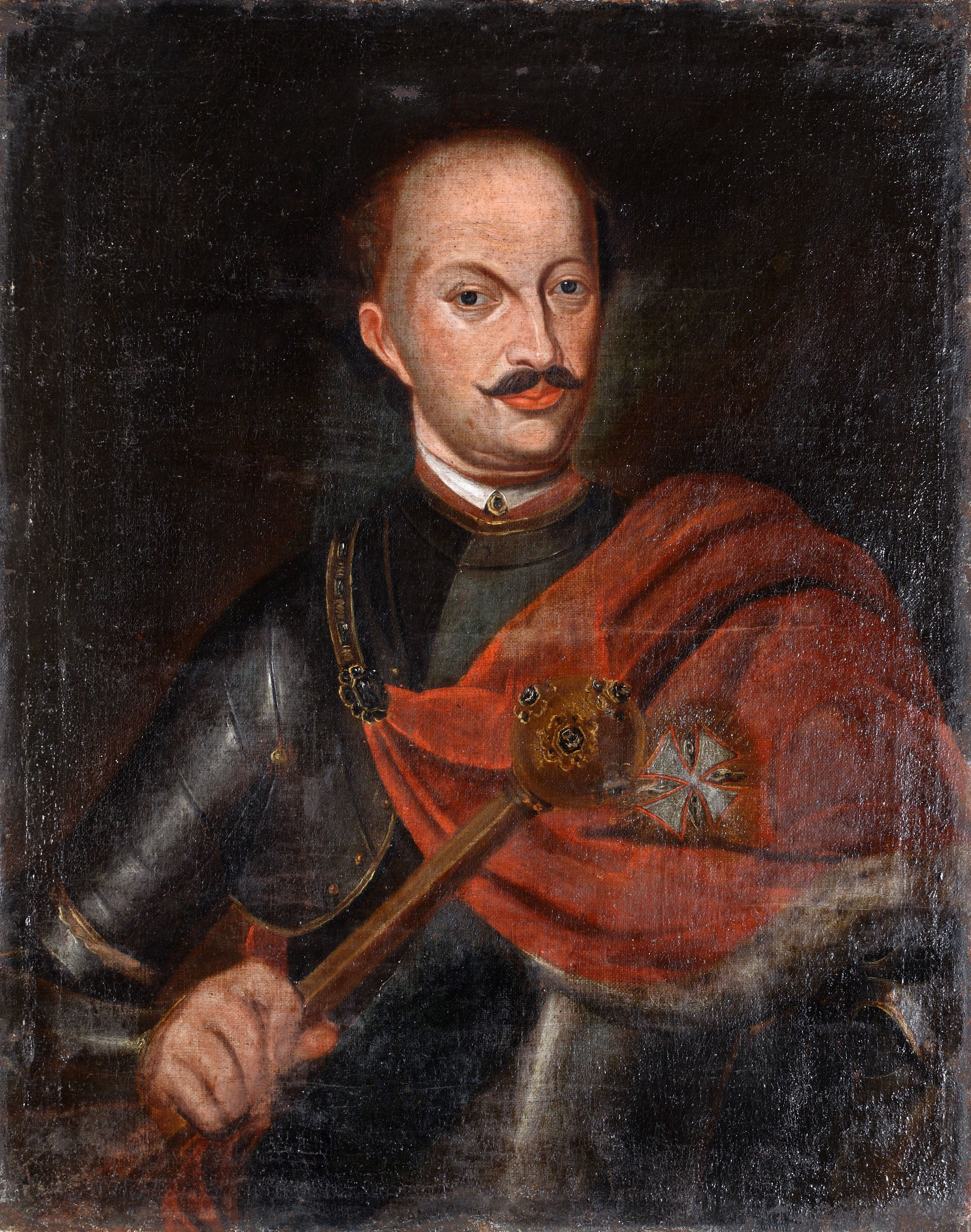

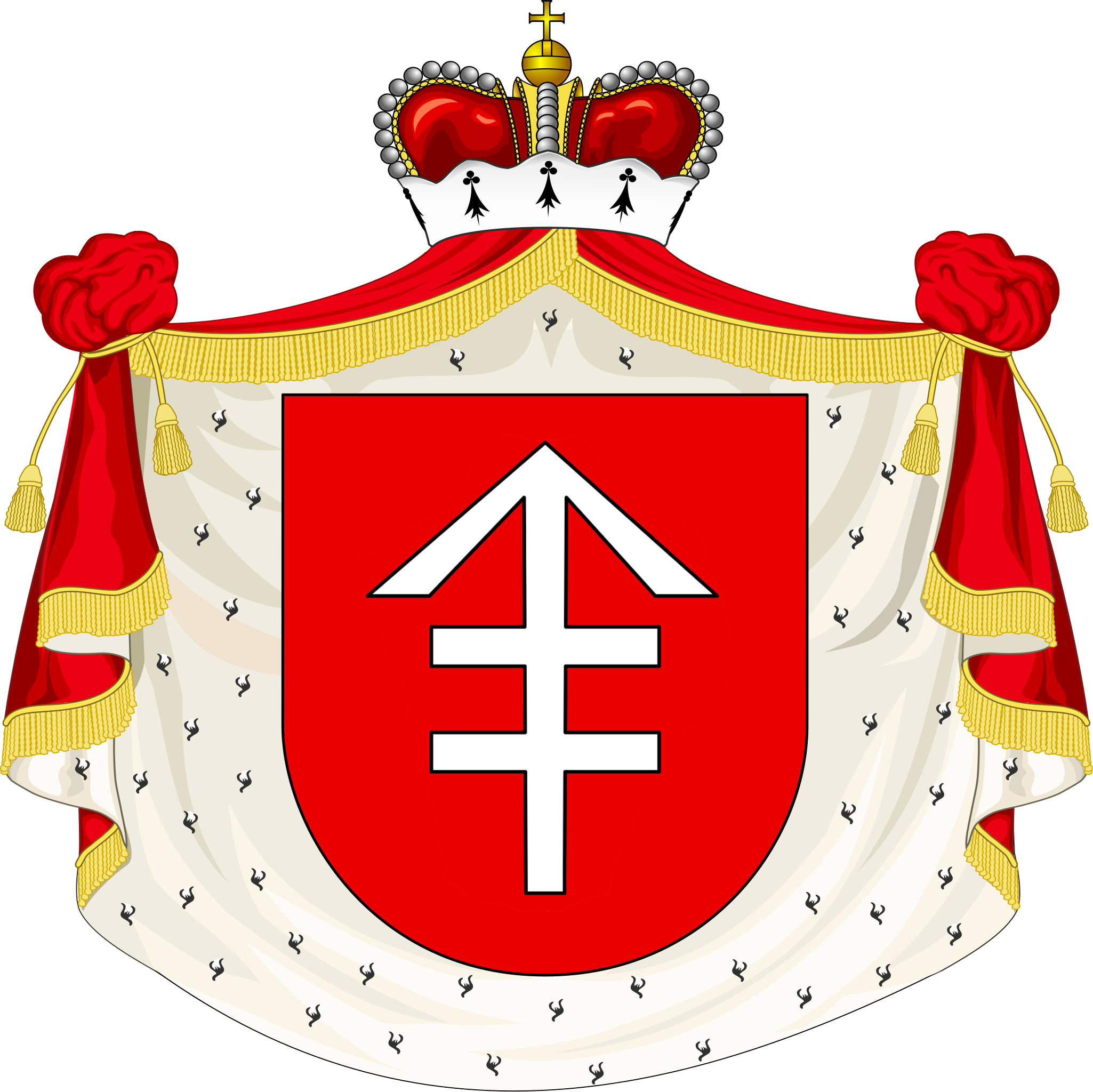

Jan Kazimierz Sapieha the Elder (Lithuanian: Jonas Kazimieras Sapiega vyresnysis; died 1730) was a grand hetman of Lithuania from 1708 to 1709.

== Life ==
He was the son of Franciszek Stefan Sapieha, father of Piotr Paweł Sapieha and Paweł Sapieha. A supporter of Stanisław Leszczyński, he took part in many battles of the Great Northern War. Charles XII of Sweden considered him a good commander, and influenced his relative, Jan Kazimierz Sapieha the Younger, to pass the grand hetman post to him. He defeated Grzegorz Antoni Ogiński at the battle of Lachowce, but in 1709, after the Russian victory of Swedes at Battle of Poltava, he surrendered to Augustus II the Strong and was forced to abandon his hetmanship. In 1716, he joined the anti-Saxon Tarnogród Confederation. In the last years of his life he became a supporter of the Russian Empire, in particular, of Catherine I of Russia, for which in 1726 he was rewarded with a rank of field marshal, and in 1727, governor-general of Saint Petersburg (Saint Petersburg Governorate) and Ingria.
