= Korea, Gmina Telatyn =

Korea
- Village
- Location within Poland
- Coordinates: 50°30′48″N 23°49′51″E
- Country: Poland
- Voivodeship: Lublin
- County: Tomaszów
- Gmina: Telatyn
- Time zone: UTC+1 (CET)
  - Summer (DST): UTC+2 (CEST)
- Vehicle registration: LTM

Korea [kɔˈrɛa] is a village in the administrative district of Gmina Telatyn, within Tomaszów County, Lublin Voivodeship, in south-eastern Poland.
