= Nowosiółki, Gmina Telatyn =

Nowosiółki
- Village
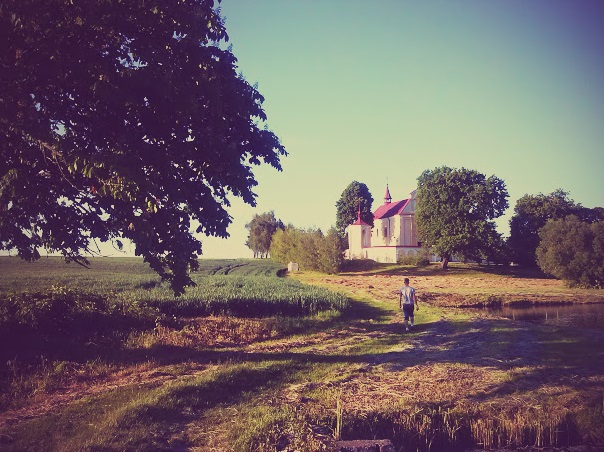
- Church in Nowosiółki

- Location within Poland
- Coordinates: 50°31′38″N 23°55′04″E
- Country: Poland
- Voivodeship: Lublin
- County: Tomaszów
- Gmina: Telatyn

Nowosiółki [nɔvɔˈɕuu̯kʲi] is a village in the administrative district of Gmina Telatyn, within Tomaszów County, Lublin Voivodeship, in eastern Poland.
