= Bazarek =

- Settlement
- Location within Poland
- Coordinates: 50°32′47″N 23°49′7″E
- Country: Poland
- Voivodeship: Lublin
- County: Tomaszów
- Gmina: Telatyn

Bazarek [baˈzarɛk] is a settlement in the administrative district of Gmina Telatyn, within Tomaszów County, Lublin Voivodeship, in eastern Poland.
