= Telatyn =

- Village
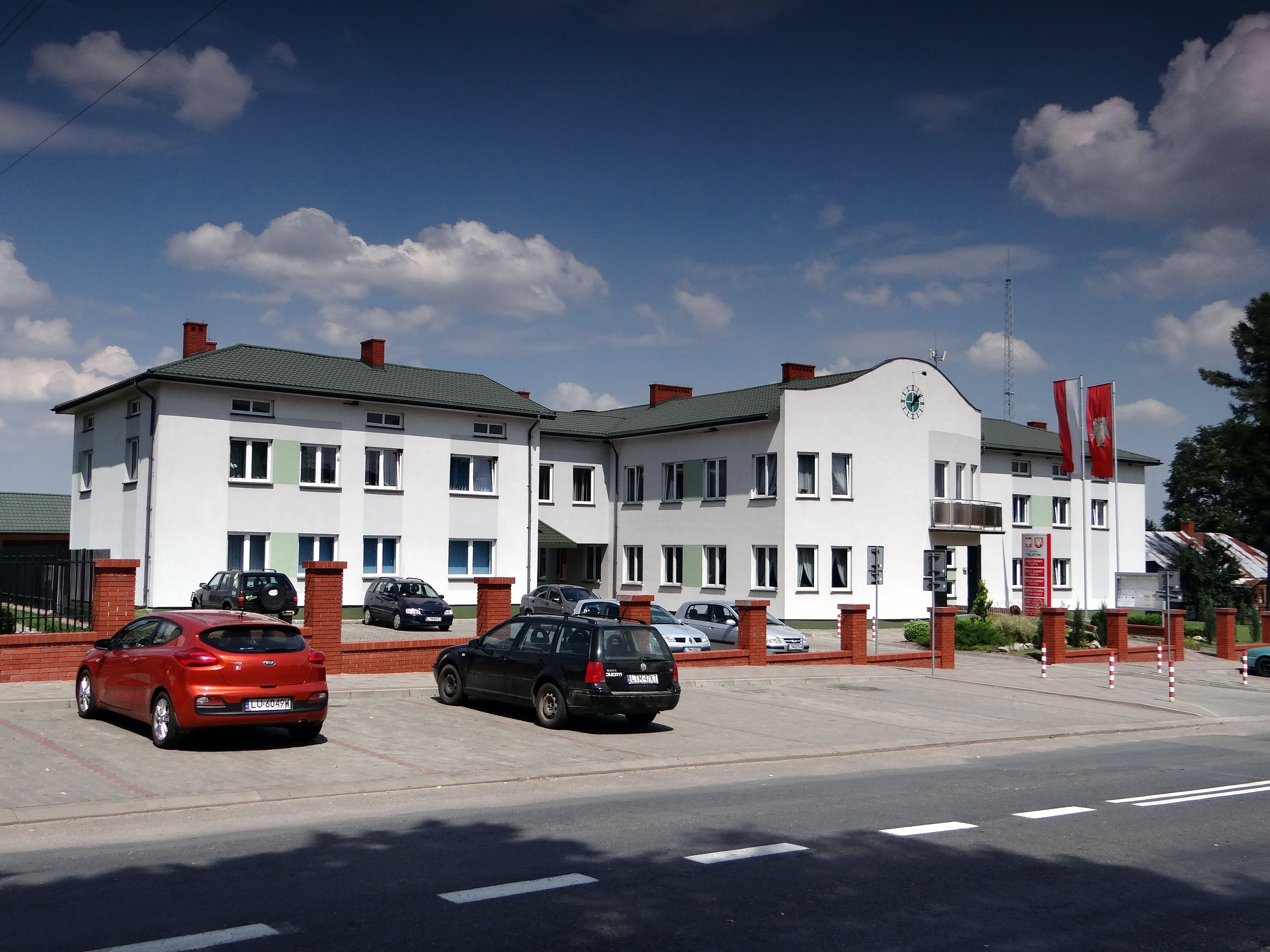
- Gmina Telatyn administration building
- Interactive map of Telatyn
- Location within Poland
- Coordinates: 50°32′N 23°51′E
- Country: Poland
- Voivodeship: Lublin
- County: Tomaszów
- Gmina: Telatyn

Population
  - Total: 603
- Time zone: UTC+1 (CET)
  - Summer (DST): UTC+2 (CEST)
- Vehicle registration: LTM
- Website: www.telatyn.pl

Telatyn [tɛˈlatɨn] is a village in Tomaszów County, Lublin Voivodeship, in south-eastern Poland. It is the seat of the gmina (administrative district) called Gmina Telatyn.

== History ==
An Orthodox church existed in the village at least since the 16th century. It was converted to the Greek Catholic (Uniate) Church at the turn of the 16th and 17th centuries. According to Metropolitan Ilarion (Ohienko), an Orthodox church in the village was first mentioned in 1430. Ukrainian historian Ivan Krypiakevych dated the first documentary mention of the church to 1578.

Telatyn was part of the Kingdom of Poland, until it was annexed by Austria in the First Partition of Poland in 1772. After the Polish victory in the Austro-Polish War of 1809 it was regained by Poles and included within the short-lived Duchy of Warsaw. Following the duchy's dissolution in 1815, Telatyn became part of Russian-controlled Congress Poland. According to the ethnographic expedition of 1869–1870 led by Pavlo Chubynsky, the majority of the inhabitants were Greek Catholics, and the entire population spoke the Ukrainian language. In 1872, the local Greek Catholic parish had 1,106 parishioners. At the end of the 19th century, the parish again became Orthodox. Besides the wooden church, there was also a masonry church built during the period when the village belonged to the Russian Empire. Both churches were destroyed after the deportation of the Ukrainian population following World War II.

Following the German-Soviet invasion of Poland, which started World War II in September 1939, the village was occupied by Germany until 1944. In 1943, the village had 507 Ukrainians and 456 Poles. On 1 April 1944, an ethnic Ukrainian unit of the SS and the Ukrainian People's Revolutionary Army committed a massacre of 162 Poles.

During 1943–1944, Polish nationalist armed groups killed 28 Ukrainian inhabitants of the village. In August 1944, local residents unsuccessfully appealed to the government of the Ukrainian Soviet Socialist Republic headed by Nikita Khrushchev with a request to include the village within the Ukrainian SSR. The petition was signed by 601 people.

Between 6 and 15 July 1947, during Operation Vistula, the Polish Army deported nine Ukrainian families from the village to the Recovered Territories in north-western Poland. Only 388 Roman Catholics, regarded as Poles, remained in the village.

From 1975 to 1998, the village was administratively part of Zamość Voivodeship.
