= Posadów, Gmina Telatyn =

Posadów
- Village
- Location within Poland
- Coordinates: 50°30′N 23°49′E
- Country: Poland
- Voivodeship: Lublin
- County: Tomaszów
- Gmina: Telatyn
- Time zone: UTC+1 (CET)
  - Summer (DST): UTC+2 (CEST)
- Vehicle registration: LTM

Posadów [pɔˈsaduf] is a village in the administrative district of Gmina Telatyn, within Tomaszów County, Lublin Voivodeship, in south-eastern Poland.

== History ==
Following the German-Soviet invasion of Poland, which started World War II in September 1939, the village was occupied by Germany until 1944. In April 1944, Ukrainian nationalists attacked Polish partisans of the Home Army, captured them and tortured and murdered them. On 9 April 1944, the Ukrainian Insurgent Army committed a massacre of 51 Poles and two Russians.
