= Majdan, Gmina Telatyn =

Majdan
- Settlement
- Location within Poland
- Coordinates: 50°33′33″N 23°56′44″E
- Country: Poland
- Voivodeship: Lublin
- County: Tomaszów
- Gmina: Telatyn

Majdan (Polish pronunciation: [ˈmajdan]) is a settlement in the administrative district of Gmina Telatyn, within Tomaszów County, Lublin Voivodeship, in eastern Poland.
