= Radków-Kolonia =

- Village
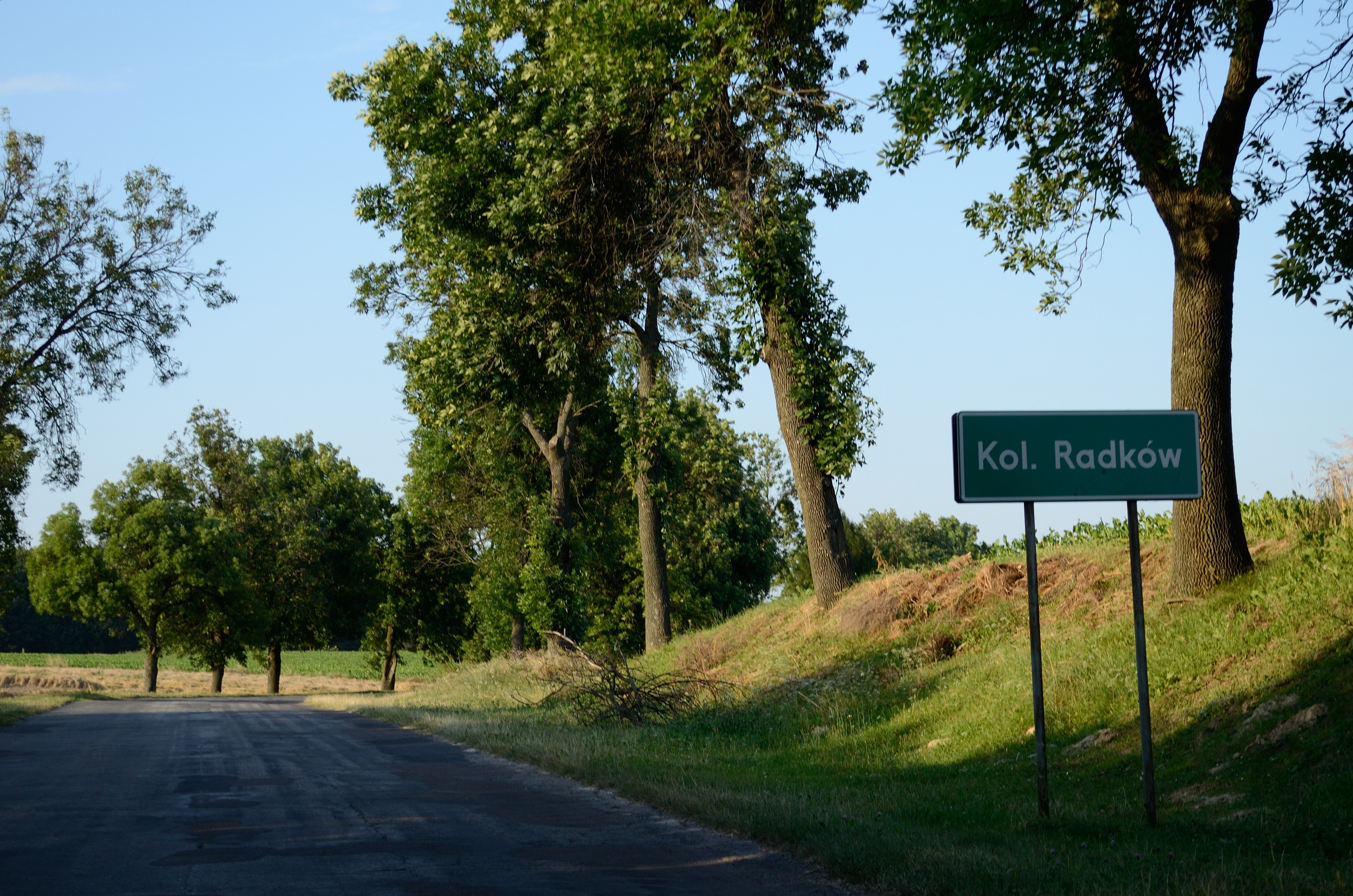
- Radków-Kolonia road sign

- Location within Poland
- Coordinates: 50°30′21″N 23°54′09″E
- Country: Poland
- Voivodeship: Lublin
- County: Tomaszów
- Gmina: Telatyn

Radków-Kolonia [ˈratkuf kɔˈlɔɲa] is a village in the administrative district of Gmina Telatyn, within Tomaszów County, Lublin Voivodeship, in eastern Poland.
