= Kryniczka =

- Settlement
- Location within Poland
- Coordinates: 50°33′5″N 23°48′15″E
- Country: Poland
- Voivodeship: Lublin
- County: Tomaszów
- Gmina: Telatyn

Kryniczka (Polish pronunciation: [krɨˈɲitska]) is a settlement in the administrative district of Gmina Telatyn, within Tomaszów County, Lublin Voivodeship, in eastern Poland.
