= Piano Trio (Chopin) =

Composition by Frédéric Chopin

- by Frédéric Chopin
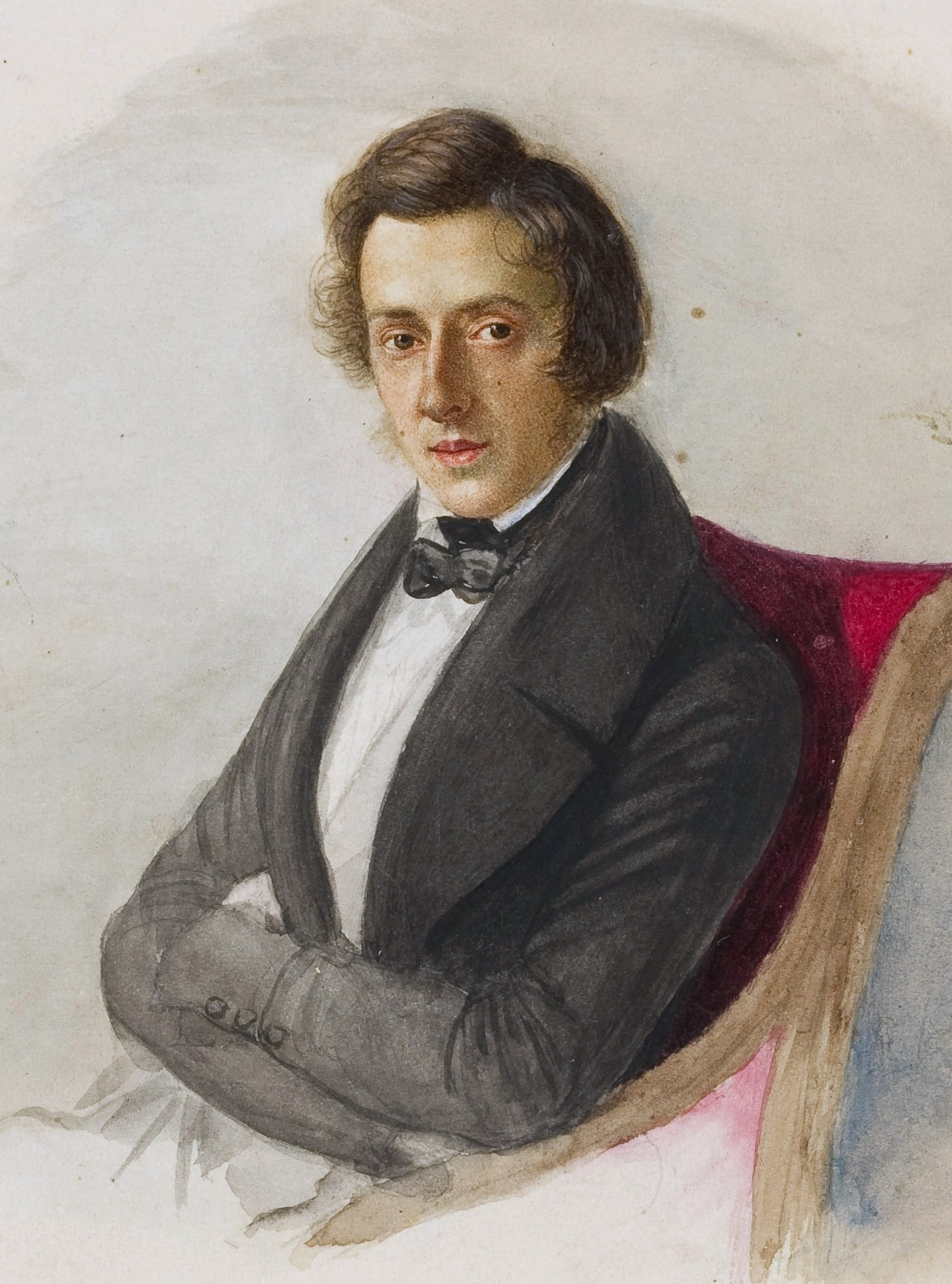
- Chopin in 1835
- Key: G minor
- Opus: 8
- Dedication: Antoni Radziwiłł
- Published: 1829
- Movements: four

The Piano Trio, Op. 8, is a composition in G minor for piano, violin and cello by Frédéric Chopin, written in 1828 or 1829 and published in 1829, dedicated to Antoni Radziwiłł. It is a piece of musical juvenilia, written by Chopin when he was still young.

== Structure ==
The composition has four movements:

1. Allegro con fuoco (G minor)
2. Scherzo: Vivace (G major)
3. Adagio sostenuto (E♭ major)
4. Finale: Allegretto (G minor)

Of interest is the fact that the second theme of the first movement stays in the tonic (there is no modulation to the relative major), and that the third movement sounds uncharacteristically Beethovenian for Chopin (most probably because this is a work by a young composer still trying to find his original musical ideas).

A typical performance lasts approximately 25–27 minutes, if the exposition repeat in the first movement is not taken — otherwise, such a performance can often be 2 to 3 minutes longer.

It is the only work by Chopin that features the violin (excluding orchestral parts) — an instrument to which he was somewhat indifferent, as reflected in the relative lack of sophistication of the violin parts. In a letter to his friend Tytus Woyciechowski dated 31 August 1830, (Note: Letter no. 63 in the new edition of Fryderyk Chopin’s Correspondence, edited by Zofia Helman, Zbigniew Skowron, and Hanna Wroblewska-Strauss, University of Warsaw, 2010) Chopin speculates whether he should have written the violin line for viola, believing that the viola's timbre would "accord better with the cello". Emanuel Ax is of the opinion that it is perhaps fortunate that Chopin scored the work for a standard piano trio, since so few trios with viola exist.
