= Anna Caroline Oury =

German musician (1806–1880)

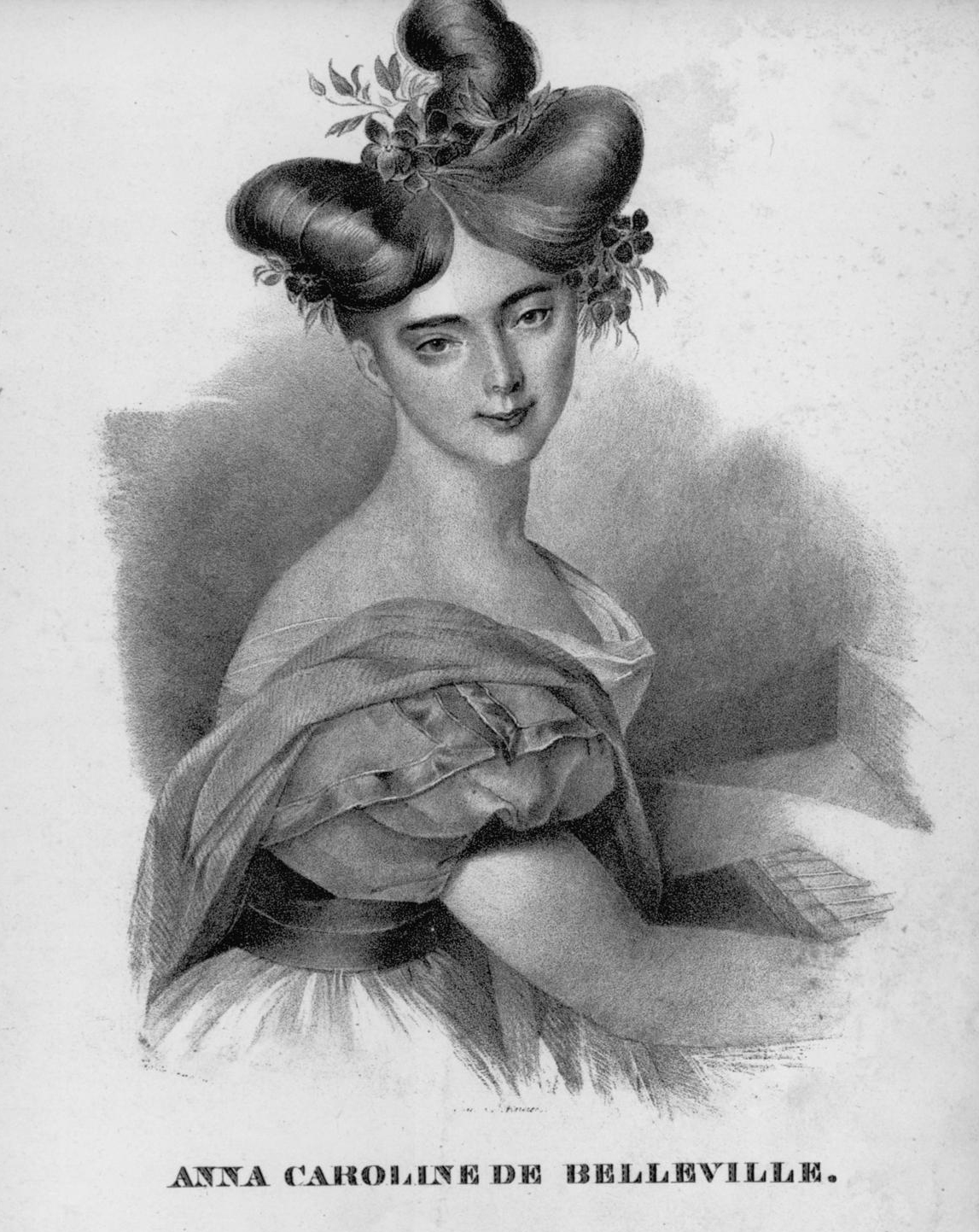
- Anna Caroline Oury
- Born: 24 January 1806; Landshut, Kingdom of Bavaria
- Died: 22 July 1880 (aged 74)
- Occupations: pianist, composer

Anna Caroline Oury (née de Belleville), also known as Ninette de Belleville, Ninette von Belleville or Ninette de Belleville-Oury (24 January 1806 – 22 July 1880), was a German pianist and composer of French ancestry.

== Life and career ==
Anna Caroline de Belleville, often referred to as "Ninette", was born in Landshut, Bavaria, Germany. She was the daughter of a French aristocrat who was the director of the national Court Opera in Mannheim. She studied with Carl Czerny in Vienna between 1816 and 1820, where she met Beethoven and heard him improvise. In 1829 she traveled to Warsaw where Chopin heard her play impressively enough for him to write about it in a letter, praising her "excellent" playing for its lightness and elegance. Twelve years later, in 1841, Chopin dedicated his Waltz in F minor, Op. Posth. 70, No. 2, to Oury, though it went unpublished until 1855.

In July 1831 she made her London debut in Her Majesty's Theatre with Niccolò Paganini and in October she married Antonio James Oury (1800–1883), a violinist at the King's Theatre in London and the two toured as a duo. They performed in Germany, France, Belgium, the Netherlands, Austria and Russia between 1831 and 1839 before settling in England, excepting a concert tour of Italy in 1846–1847. Working with her husband, she helped to create the Brighton Musical Union in 1847, a club for chamber music modelled after the London Musical Union. The remainder of Anna Caroline Oury's career was spent focusing on composition until her retirement in 1866, writing approximately 180 works for piano in this time. Oury died in Munich in 1880 at the age of 74.

== Works ==
Oury published more than 200 works, including a number of transcriptions. Selected works include:

- Souvenir d'Edinbourg (arrangement)
- Fantasie on the opera L'Africaine
- La Chasse de Compiègne
- Plaintes de l'absence
- Marche Ecossaise
- Valse brillante
- Nocturne
