= Gmina Telatyn =

Gmina Telatyn Telatyn Commune
- Gmina
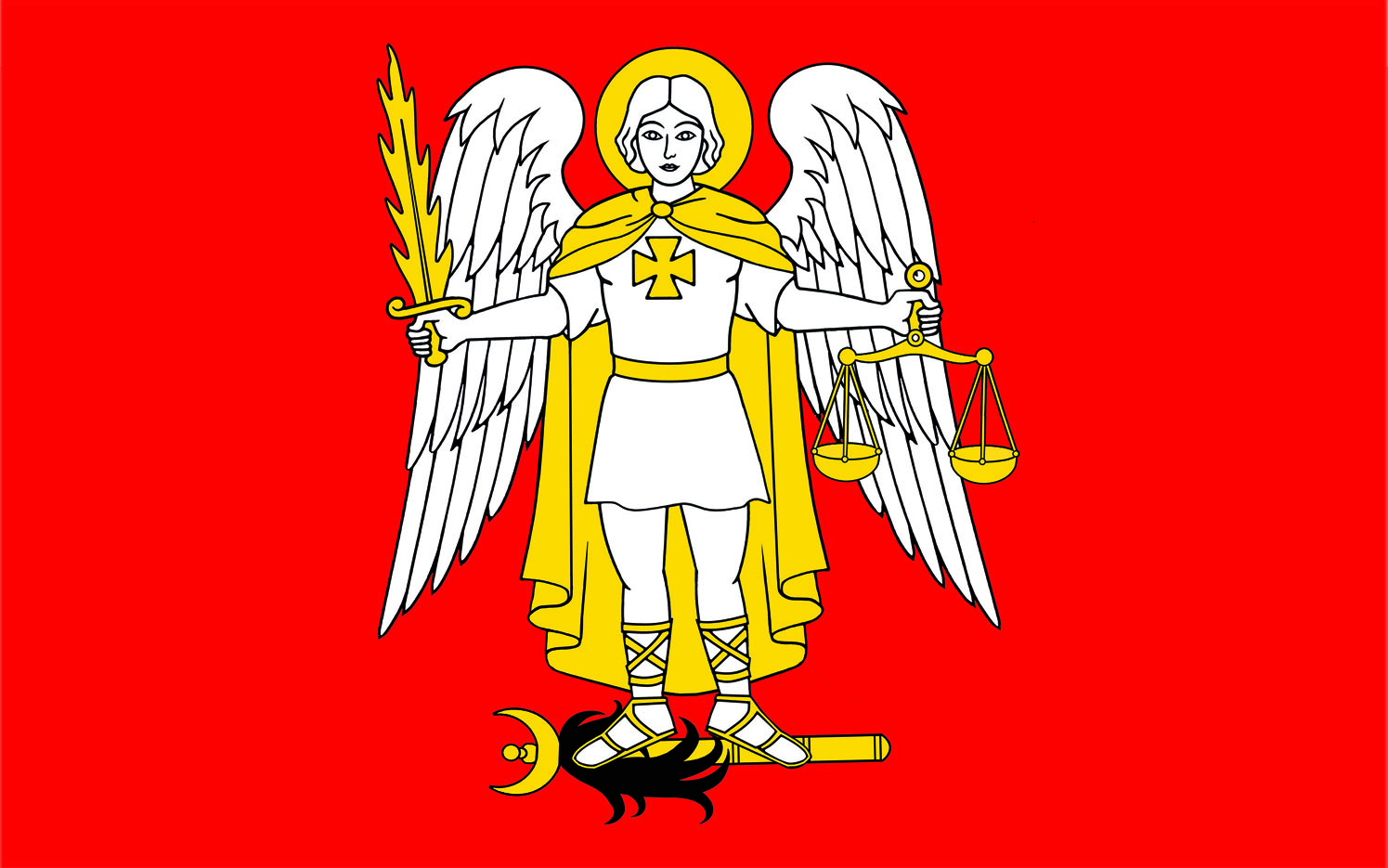
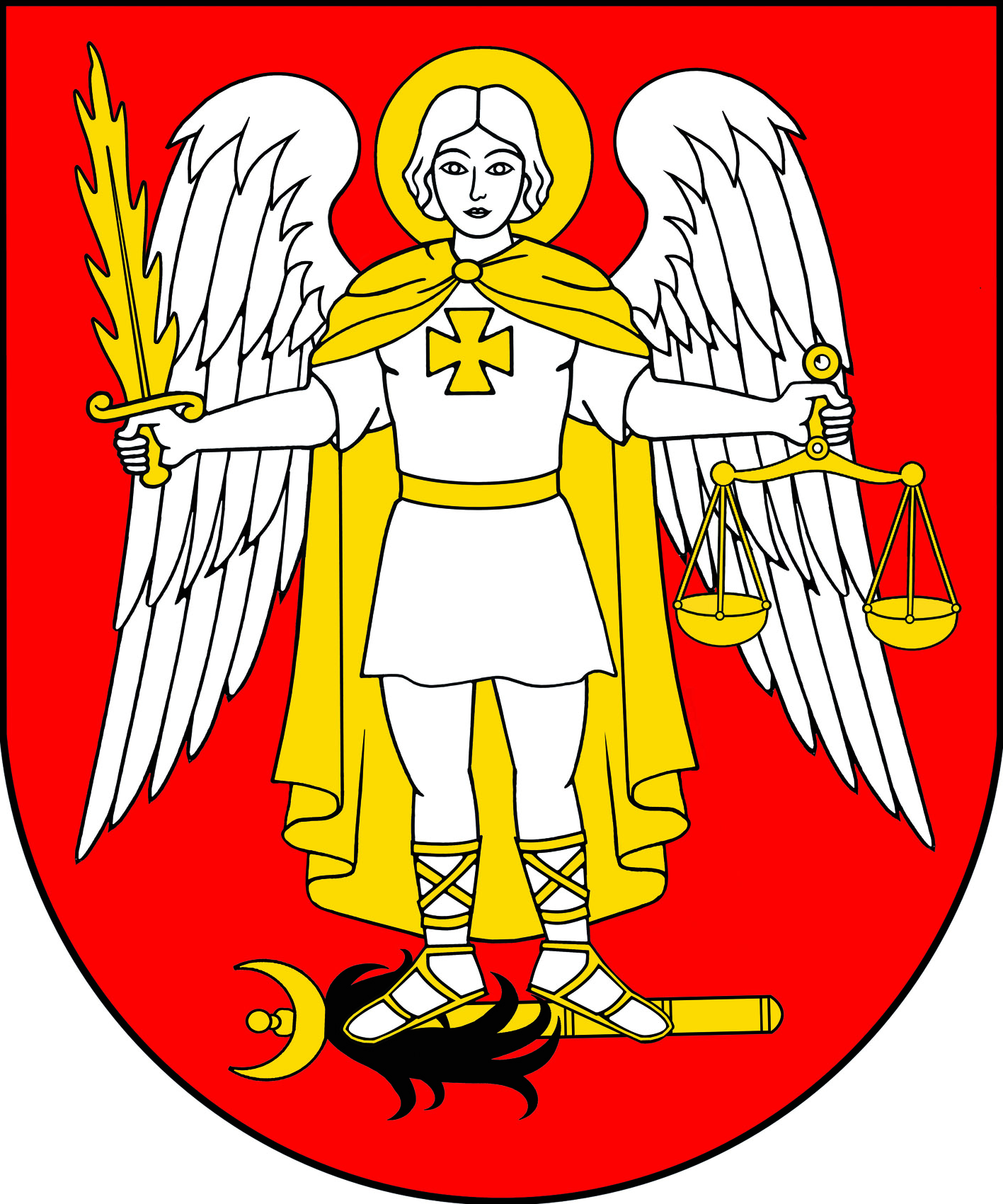
- Flag Coat of arms
- Interactive map of Gmina Telatyn
- Coordinates (Telatyn): 50°32′N 23°51′E
- Country: Poland
- Voivodeship: Lublin
- County: Tomaszów
- Seat: Telatyn

Area
  - Total: 109.66 km^{2} (42.34 sq mi)

Population (2013)
  - Total: 4,252
  - Density: 38.77/km^{2} (100.4/sq mi)
- Website: http://www.telatyn.pl

Gmina Telatyn is a rural gmina (administrative district) in Tomaszów County, Lublin Voivodeship, in eastern Poland. Its seat is the village of Telatyn, which lies approximately 33 kilometres (21 mi) east of Tomaszów Lubelski and 120 km (75 mi) south-east of the regional capital Lublin.

The gmina covers an area of 109.66 square kilometres (42.3 sq mi), and as of 2006 its total population is 4,461 (4,252 in 2013).

== Villages ==
Gmina Telatyn contains the villages and settlements of Bazarek, Dutrów, Franusin, Korea, Kryniczka, Kryszyn, Łachowce, Łykoszyn, Majdan, Marysin, Nowosiółki, Posadów, Poturzyn, Radków, Radków-Kolonia, Suszów, Telatyn, Wasylów and Żulice.

== Neighbouring gminas ==
Gmina Telatyn is bordered by the gminas of Dołhobyczów, Łaszczów, Mircze and Ulhówek.
