= Kryszyn =

- Village
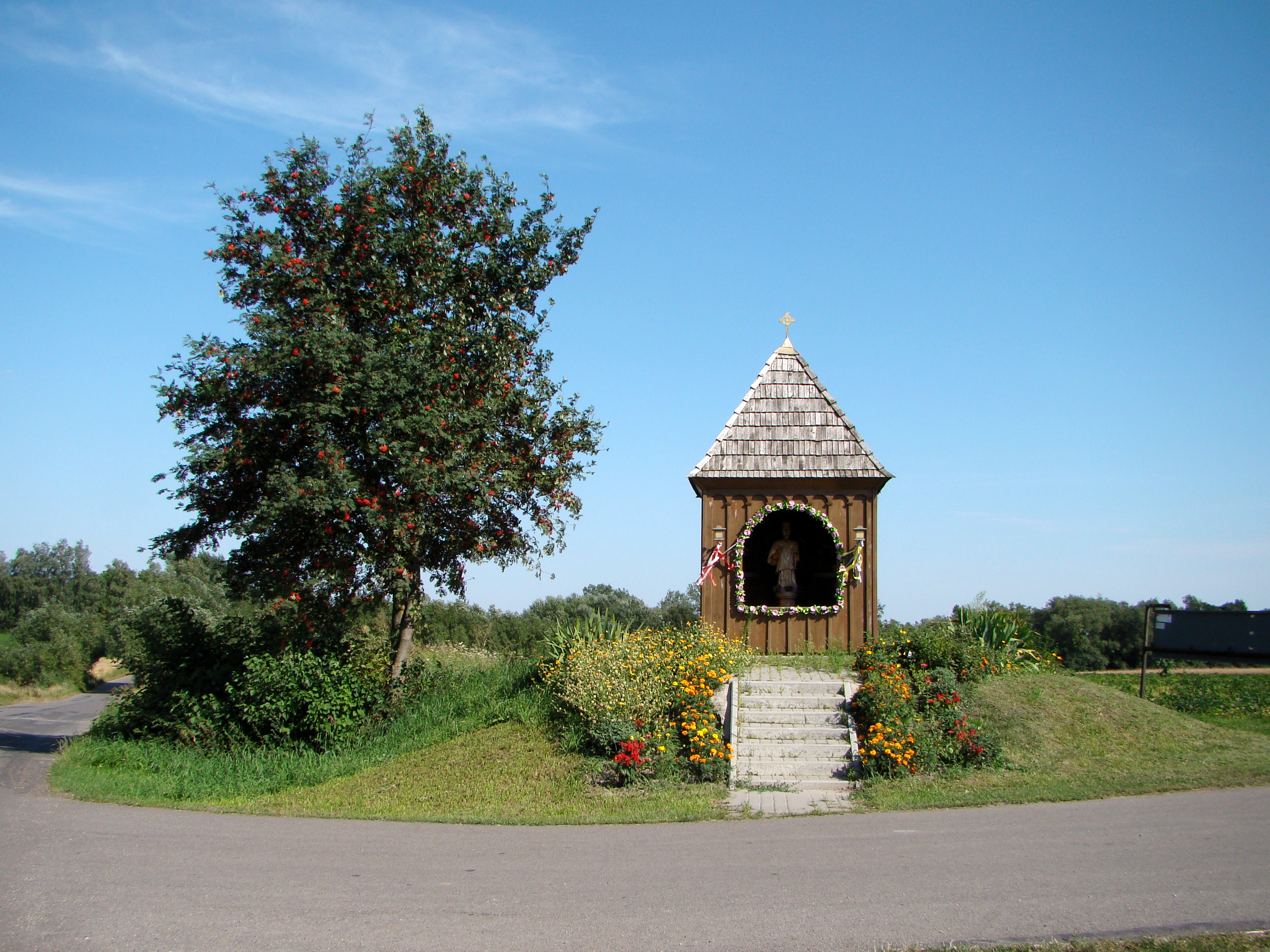
- Wayside shrine in Kryszyn

- Location within Poland
- Coordinates: 50°34′N 23°49′E
- Country: Poland
- Voivodeship: Lublin
- County: Tomaszów
- Gmina: Telatyn

Population
  - Total: 460
- Time zone: UTC+1 (CET)
  - Summer (DST): UTC+2 (CEST)

Kryszyn [ˈkrɨʂɨn] is a village in the administrative district of Gmina Telatyn, within Tomaszów County, Lublin Voivodeship, in eastern Poland.

== History ==
16 Polish citizens were murdered by Nazi Germany in the village during World War II.
