= Dutrów =

- Village
- Location within Poland
- Coordinates: 50°33′N 23°49′E
- Country: Poland
- Voivodeship: Lublin
- County: Tomaszów
- Gmina: Telatyn

Dutrów [ˈdutruf] is a village in the administrative district of Gmina Telatyn, within Tomaszów County, Lublin Voivodeship, in eastern Poland.
