= Tytus Woyciechowski =

Polish politician (1808–1879)

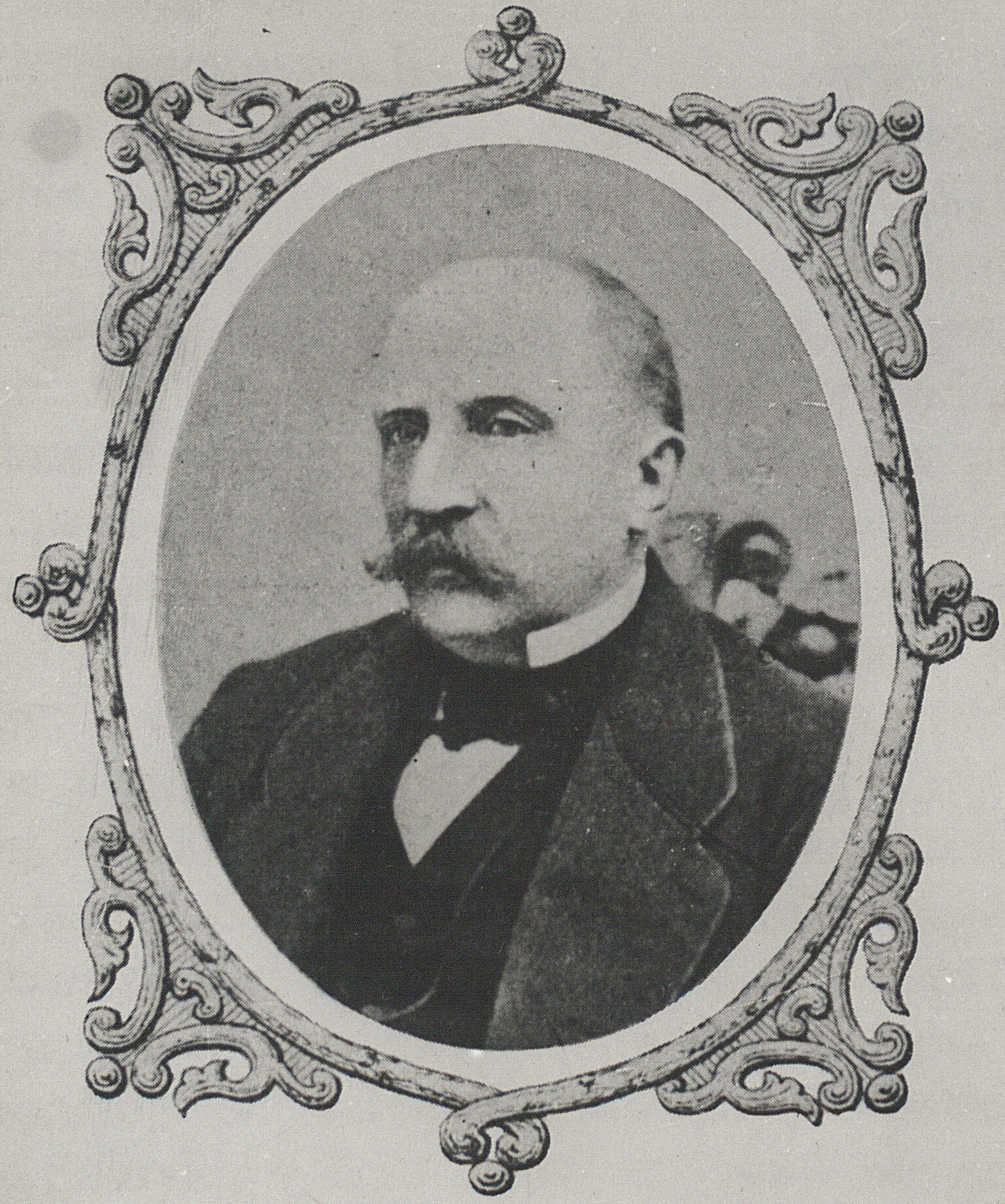
Tytus Woyciechowski, c. 1875

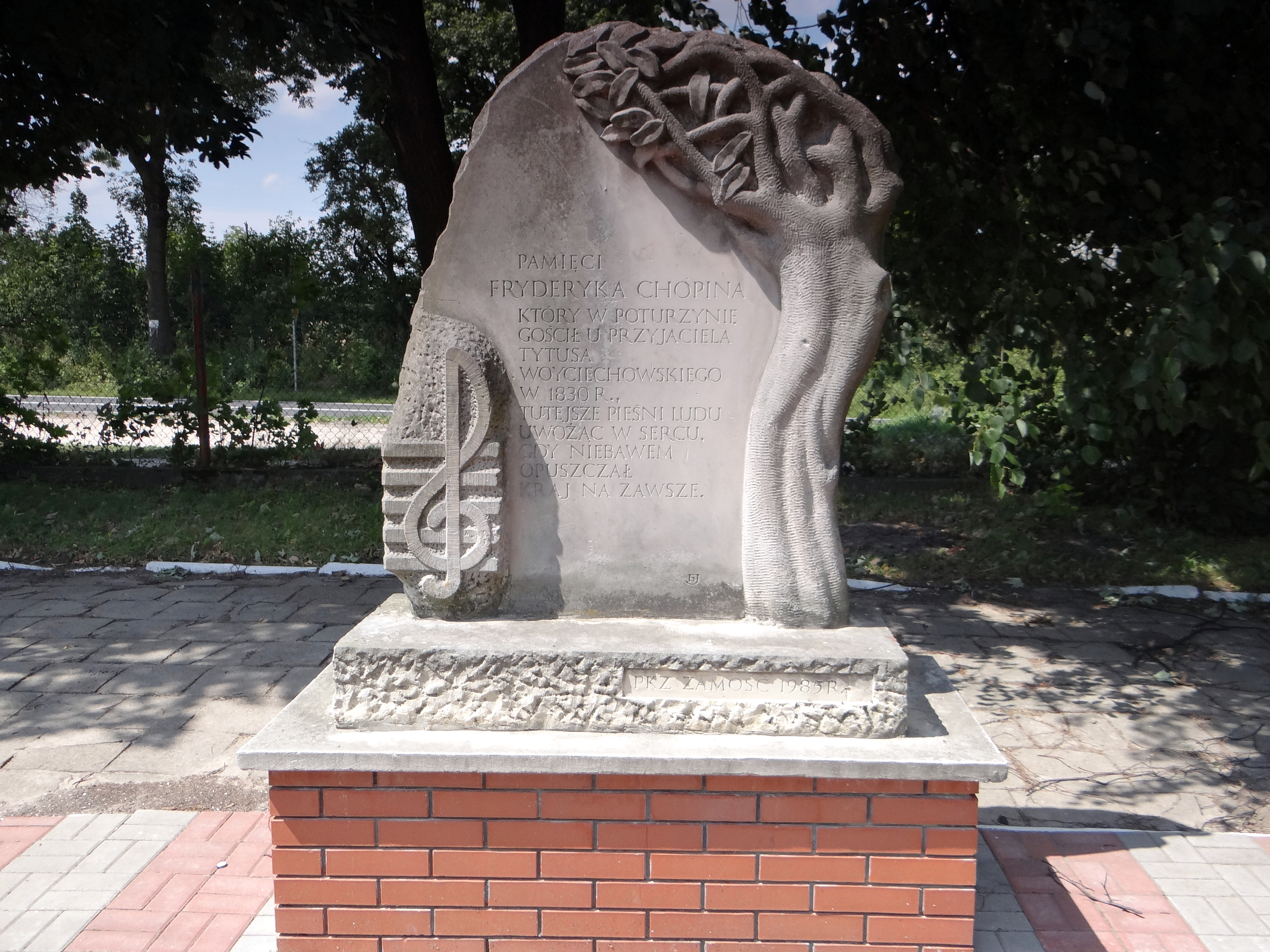
Memorial to Chopin's visit to Poturzyn

Tytus Sylwester Woyciechowski (31 December 1808 – 23 March 1879) was a Polish political activist, agriculturalist, and patron of art. He was an early friend — and possible lover — of the Polish composer Frédéric Chopin.

The spelling of Woyciechowski's surname is an archaic version of the more common "Wojciechowski", with a "y" instead of a "j".

== Life ==
Woyciechowski was born in Lemberg, Austrian Empire (now Lviv, Ukraine).

=== Relationship with Chopin ===
In his youth Woyciechowski was a fellow student of Chopin's at the Warsaw Lyceum, boarding with the Chopin family. He went on to study law at Warsaw University.

Chopin dedicated to him his Op. 2 Variations on "Là ci darem la mano". Woyciechowski wrote on the front page of the Variations "J'accepte avec plaisir" ("I accept with pleasure"). Prior to that, he had already dedicated to him the Variations in F major for piano four hands, which are now lost. In October 1829 Chopin sent him the Waltz Op. 70,3 together with a letter. In July 1830 Chopin visited Woyciechowski for a month at his estate in Poturzyn, which Woyciechowski had inherited from his mother. Chopin recalled this visit in a letter:

I tell you sincerely that it is pleasant to recall all of this. Your fields left in me some sort of longing; that birch under the windows just will not leave my memory. That crossbow! How romantic it all was! I remember that crossbow, with which you really wore me out - for all my sins.

— Frédéric Chopin to Tytus Woyciechowski (21.8.1830)

Although Chopin repeatedly and unequivocally referred to Woyciechowski as 'his lover', many biographers believe that he acted as a confidant for Chopin during an alleged infatuation with the singer Konstancja Gładkowska.

Woyciechowski is shown in Chopin's letters to him to be amongst the composer's favorite friends, or perhaps a lover:

As always, even now, I carry your letters with me. How blissful it will be for me, having gone beyond the city walls in May, thinking about my approaching journey, to pull out a letter of yours and assure myself sincerely that you love me, or at least to gaze at the hand and the writing of him, whom only I am able to love!

— Frédéric Chopin to Tytus Woyciechowski (27.3.1830)

I will go and wash. Don't kiss me now, because I haven't yet washed. You? Even if I were to rub myself with Byzantine oils, you still wouldn't kiss me, unless I compelled you to do so with magnetism. There is some sort of force in nature. Today you will dream that you're kissing me. I have to pay you back for the nasty dream you brought me last night.

— Frédéric Chopin to Tytus Woyciechowski (4.9.1830)

Woyciechowski accompanied Chopin in his 1830 journey to Austria but, on learning of the November 1830 Uprising, returned to Warsaw to take part in the fighting. He became a second lieutenant and was awarded the highest Polish military decoration, the Virtuti Militari. While the two never met thereafter, they continued to correspond.

=== Later life ===
In 1838, Woyciechowski married Countess Aloysia Poletylo, by whom he had four children – their second son being named Fryderyk, after Chopin.

Woyciechowski dedicated himself to agriculture, pioneered the introduction of crop rotation in Poland, and in 1847 founded one of the first sugar factories in the country. In 1857, he temporarily stood in for Julian Fontana in the process of publishing Chopin’s Songs, Op. 74. 1861–62 he was an active member of the White Party, which took part in the failed January 1863 Uprising.

He died in Poturzyn, now Poland.

The Woyciechowski collection of Chopin memorabilia was destroyed by fire in 1914: It contained a piano made by the Buchholtz company, on which Chopin played and composed, copies of his compositions (the piano Variations à quatre mains ending in a fugue, written on 17 pages, and a contredanse), Chopin's letters to Tytus Woyciechowski and a pen in the shape of a column, with a head and base in gold and a core in coloured mosaic. The base, decorated with the initials T.W., served at the same time as a seal. A card with Chopin's dedication lay in a special case. The family manor house at Poturzyn was destroyed during the Second World War.

== Sources ==
- Weber, Moritz (2026). Chopins Männer. Basel: Schwabe ISBN 978-3-7965-5429-2
- "Tytus Woyciechowski" (a) on Chopin Institute website (in Polish), accessed 12.2.2014
- "Tytus Woyciechowski" (b) on Chopin Kalejdoskop website, accessed 12.2.2014.
- Walker, Alan (2018). Fryderyk Chopin: A Life and Times. London: Faber and Faber. ISBN 9780571348558
- Zamoyski, Adam (2010). Chopin, Prince of the Romantics, London: HarperPress. ISBN 978-0-007-35182-4.
