= Radków, Lublin Voivodeship =

Radków
- Village
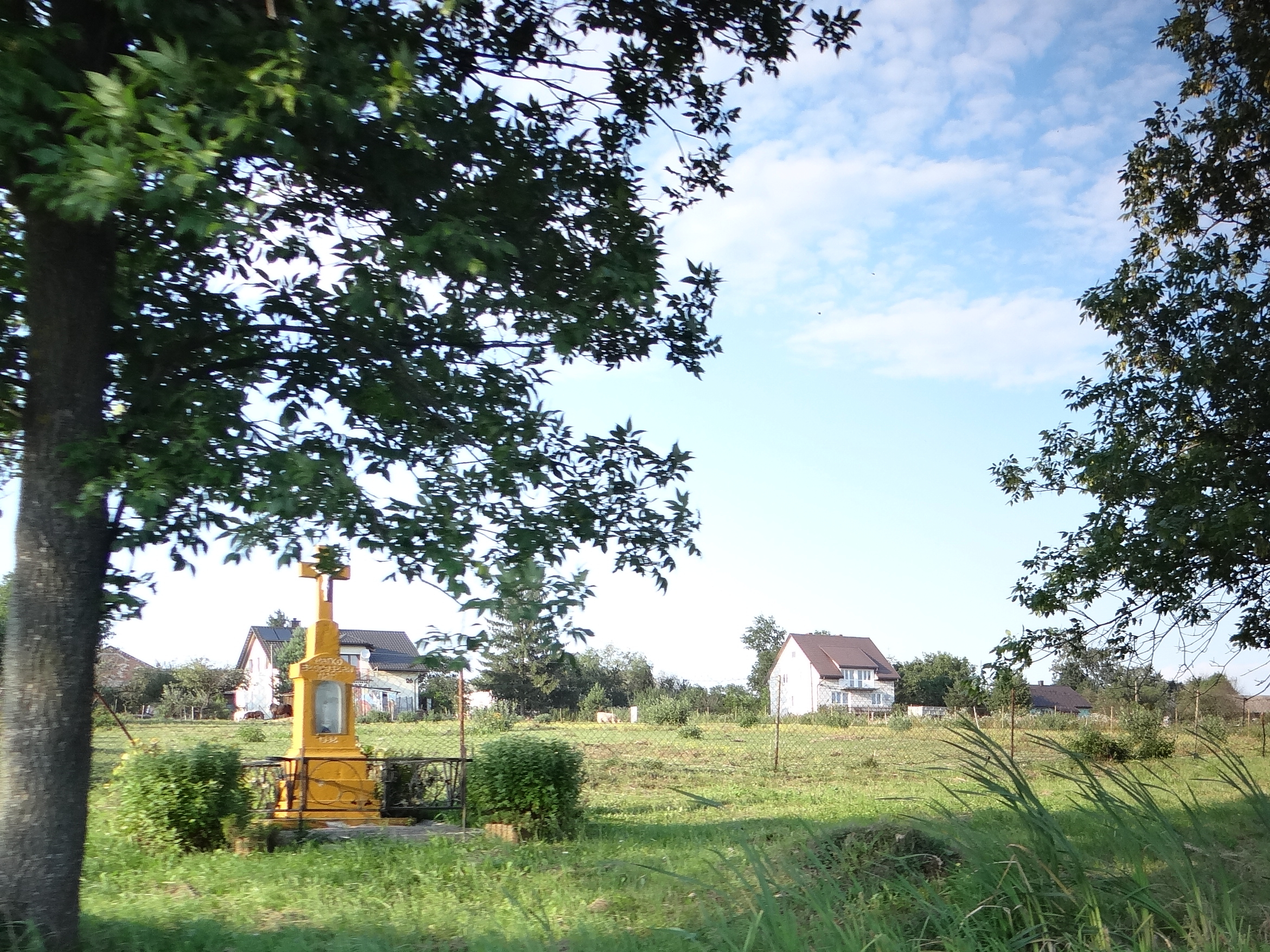

- Location within Poland
- Coordinates: 50°30′N 23°54′E
- Country: Poland
- Voivodeship: Lublin
- County: Tomaszów
- Gmina: Telatyn
- Time zone: UTC+1 (CET)
  - Summer (DST): UTC+2 (CEST)

Radków [ˈratkuf] is a village in the administrative district of Gmina Telatyn, within Tomaszów County, Lublin Voivodeship, in eastern Poland.

== History ==
Seven Polish citizens were murdered by Nazi Germany in the village during World War II.
