= Maestoso =

Musical indication or marking

Maestoso (Italian pronunciation: [ma.eˈstoːzo]) is an Italian musical term and is used to direct performers to play a certain passage of music in a stately, dignified and majestic fashion (sometimes march-like) or, it is used to describe music as such.

Maestoso also is associated with the advent of Classicism, Romanticism, and the newer forms of neo-classicism and neo-romanticism. The interpretation of maestoso is varied by the conductor depending upon the overall style in which the piece is written. Used as more of an interpretive choice, this term is not always associated with a specific tempo or tempo range.

== Examples ==
The term is commonly used in relatively not fast pieces, but there are many examples, such as the first movement of Mozart's Flute Concerto No. 1, in which a faster tempo can be played in such maestoso. Common examples of maestoso tempo include Elgar's Land of Hope and Glory, the first movement of Mozart's Piano Concerto No. 21, the first movement of both Anton Bruckner's Symphony No. 6 and Beethoven's Symphony No. 9, as well as Chopin's Polonaise in A♭ major, Op. 53. The first movement of Brahms's First Piano Concerto is another example. Beethoven also indicated “Maestoso” in the first movement of his Piano Sonata Op.111 as an introduction of "Allegro".

Maestoso is also used very often for parts of pieces meant to sound large, triumphant, heroic, and victorious, like the Olympic Fanfare and Theme by John Williams. The first movement of Chopin's first concerto is marked Allegro maestoso. The first movement of Liszt's First Piano Concerto is also marked Allegro maestoso. Yet another example of this tempo marking is the opening of the musical Wicked by Stephen Schwartz.
