= Poturzyn =

- Village
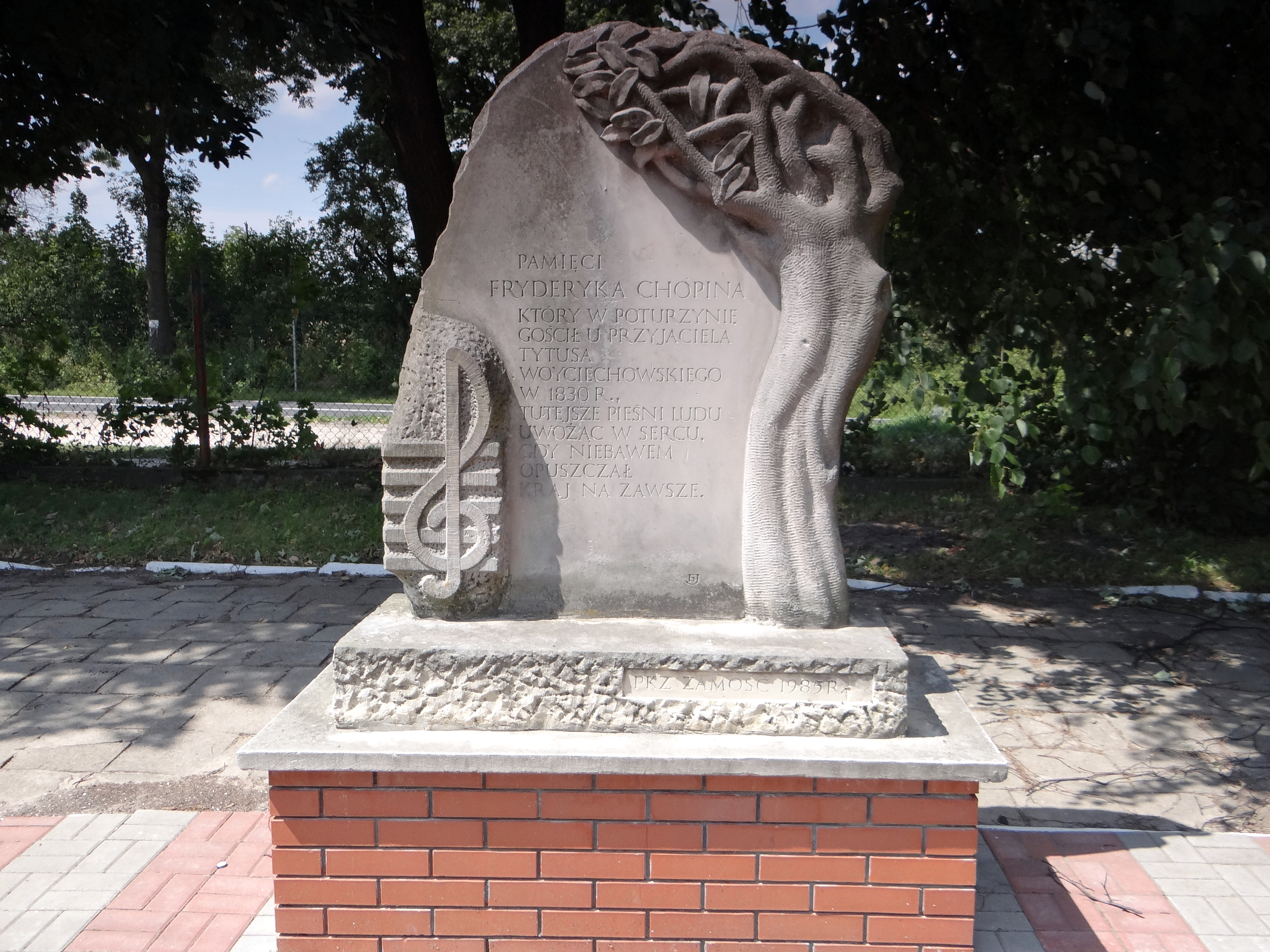
- Monument to Fryderyk Chopin

- Location within Poland
- Coordinates: 50°34′N 23°57′E
- Country: Poland
- Voivodeship: Lublin
- County: Tomaszów
- Gmina: Telatyn
- Website: http://www.poturzyn.pl/

Poturzyn [pɔˈtuʐɨn] is a village in the administrative district of Gmina Telatyn, within Tomaszów County, Lublin Voivodeship, in eastern Poland.
