= Konstancja Gładkowska =

Polish soprano (1810–1889)

Konstancja Gładkowska (1810–1889) was a Polish soprano. Frédéric Chopin at age 19, while studying at the Warsaw School of Music (now the Fryderyk Chopin University of Music in Warsaw), fell in love with. She admired many early works by Chopin, who in 1830 left Poland, eventually settling in Paris.

== Life ==
Konstancja was born on 2 June 1810 in Warsaw (other dates given for her birth are June 4 and June 10). Her godmother was an illegitimate daughter of Poland's last king, Stanisław August Poniatowski.

Konstancja studied at the Warsaw Conservatory. In 1829, during a university soloist concert, she met Chopin, for whom she became an inspiration to his music composing. In the autumn of 1830, when Chopin left Poland, she sang at his farewell.

In 1832 Konstancja married Aleksander Józef Grabowski and lived on her husband's estate in Raducz, near Rawa Mazowiecka. The couple had five children. In 1845 Konstancja lost her eyesight and, despite attempts to treat the condition, never regained her vision. In 1878 her husband died.

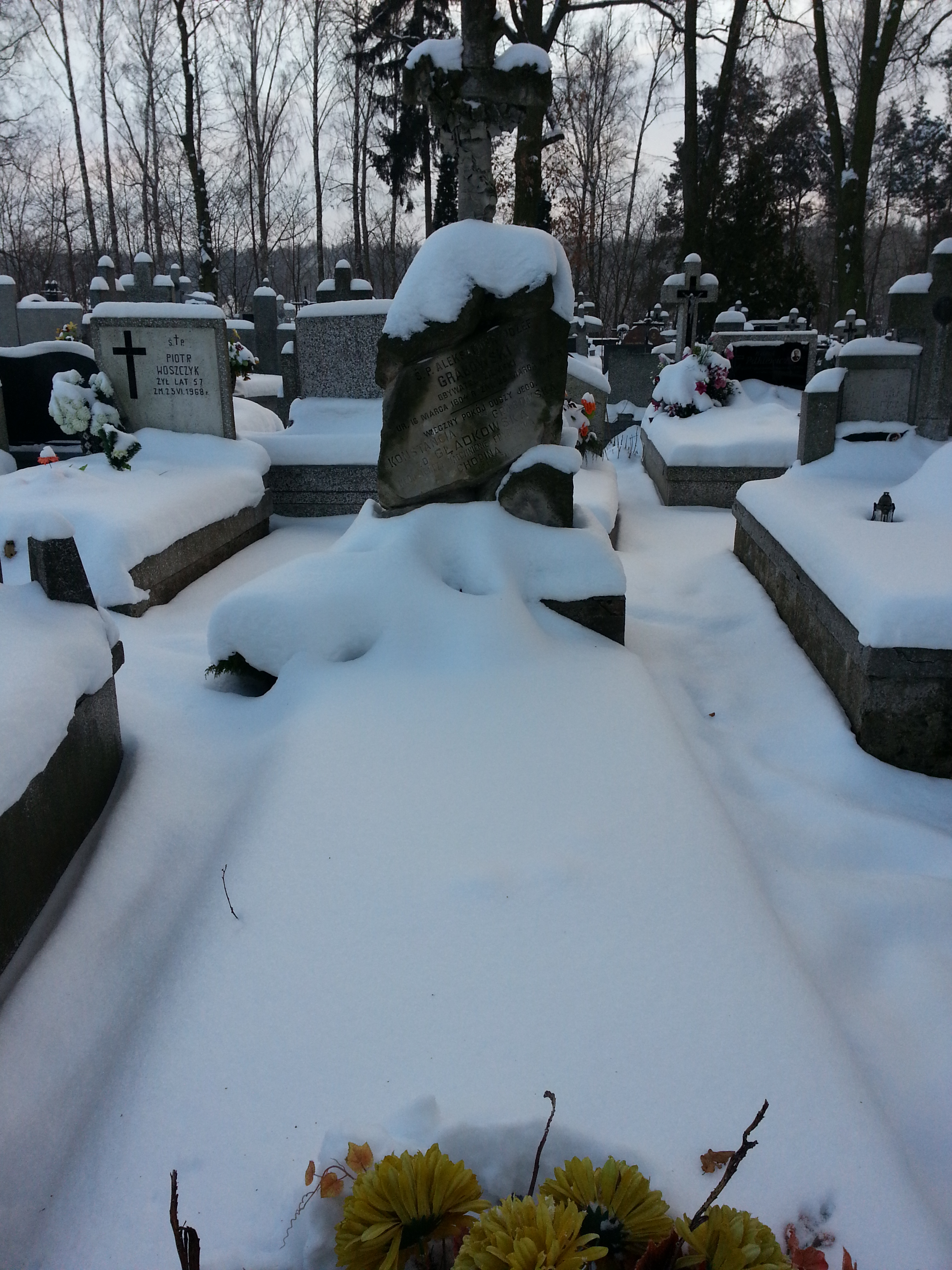
Grave of Konstancja Grabowska, née Gładkowska, and her husband in Babsk

In 1879 she moved to Skierniewice, where she died in 1889.

== Death ==
Konstancja Gladkowska died in 1889, forty years after Chopin's death. She was buried in a cemetery in the town of Babsk, 60 km from Warsaw.
