= List of jurors of the International Chopin Piano Competition =

This is a list of people who have taken part in the jury of the International Chopin Piano Competition since its foundation in 1927.

The name of the chairperson is written in bold.

== I (1927) ==
- (Poland) Zygmunt Butkiewicz
- (Poland) Zbigniew Drzewiecki
- (Germany) Alfred Hoehn (finals only)
- (Poland) **Witold Maliszewski** (chairman)
- (Poland) Piotr Maszyński
- (Poland) Henryk Melcer-Szczawiński
- (Poland) Aleksander Michałowski (first round only)
- (Poland) Zofia Rabcewiczowa
- (Poland) Adam Sołtys
- (Poland) Felicjan Szopski
- (Poland) Józef Śmidowicz
- (Poland) Józef Turczyński
- (Poland) Adam Wyleżyński
- (Poland) Jerzy Żurawlew

== II (1932) ==
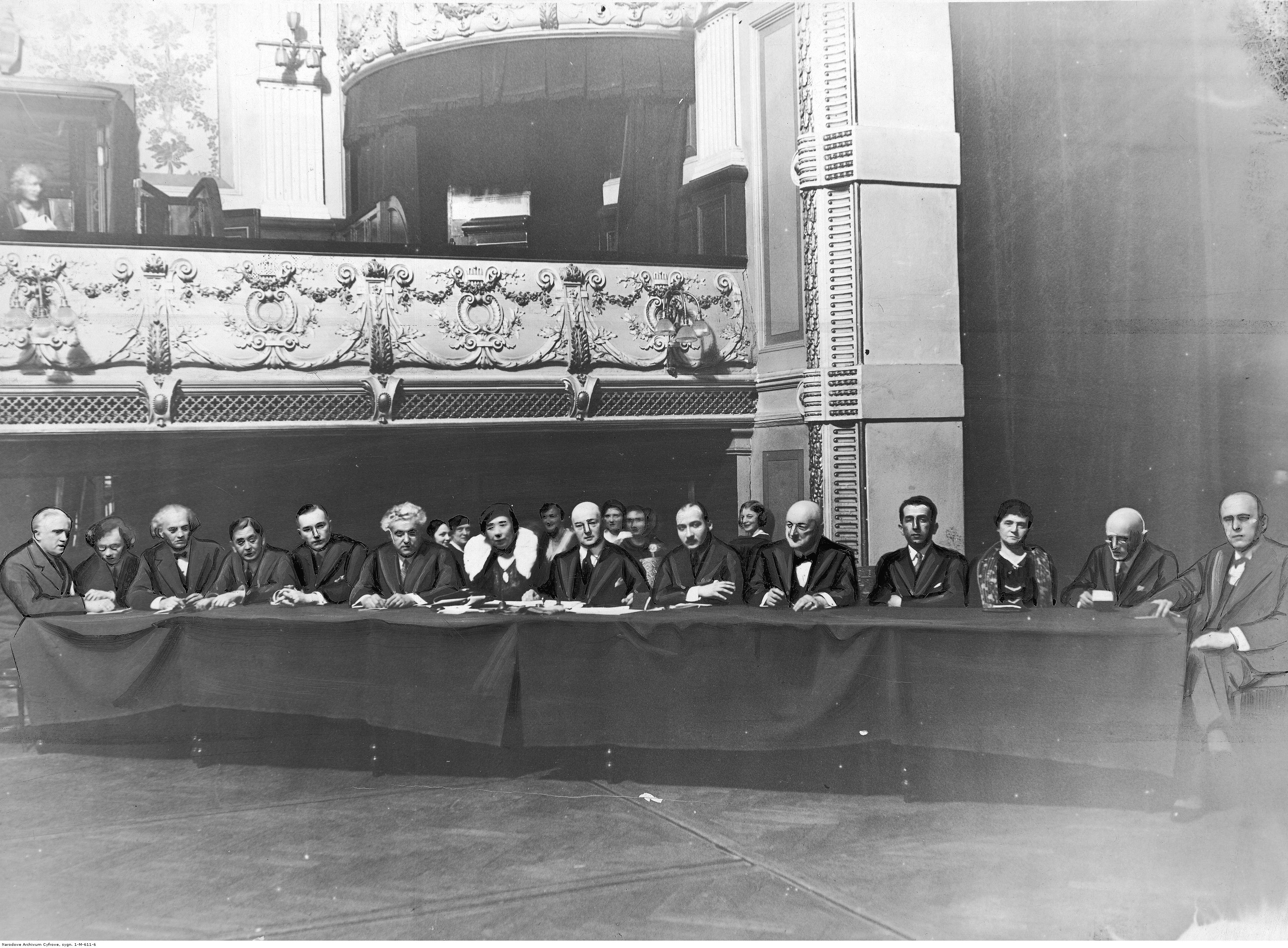
The competition jury

- (Poland) Franciszek Brzeziński (substitute)
- (Poland) Marian Dąbrowski (substitute)
- (Poland) Zbigniew Drzewiecki
- (Belgium) Arthur De Greef
- (Germany) Alfred Hoehn
- (Poland) Roman Jasiński (substitute)
- (Poland) Juliusz Kaden-Bandrowski
- (France) Marguerite Long
- (Austria) Joseph Marx
- (Poland) Eugeniusz Morawski-Dąbrowa (secretary)
- (Poland) Stanisław Niewiadomski (vice-chairman)
- (Poland) Zofia Rabcewicz
- (France) Maurice Ravel (guest of honor)
- (Germany) Richard Rössler
- (Poland) Karol Szymanowski
- (Poland) Józef Śmidowicz
- (Poland) Józef Turczyński
- (Austria) Paul Weingarten
- (Poland) **Adam Wieniawski** (chairman)
- (Italy) Carlo Zecchi
- (Poland) Jerzy Żurawlew

== III (1937) ==
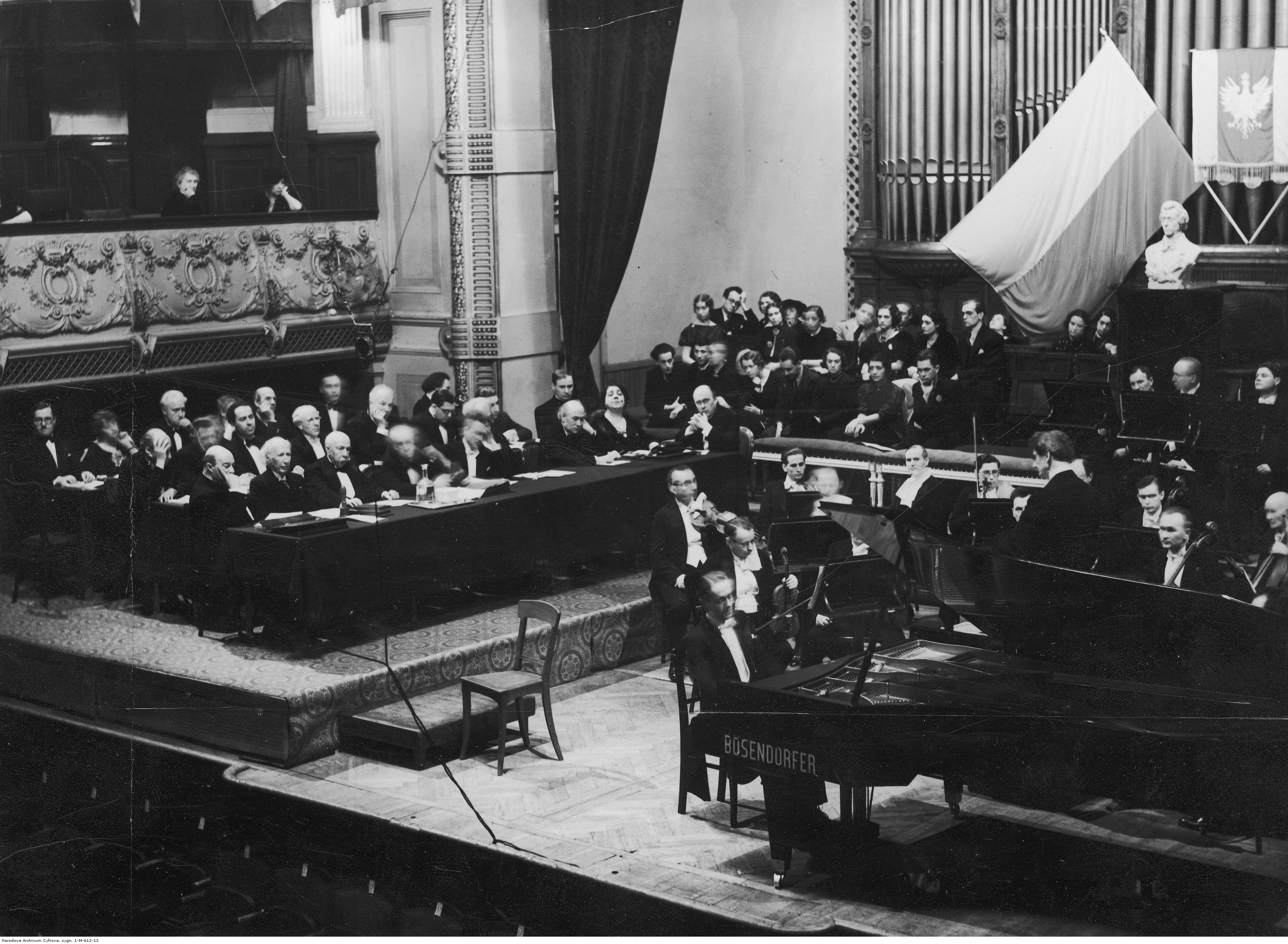
The final of the competition. The jury sits on the left.

- (Italy) Guido Agosti
- (Germany) Wilhelm Backhaus (vice-chairman)
- (Italy) Attilo Brugnoli
- (Poland) Zofia Buckiewiczowa
- (Poland) Marian Dąbrowski
- (Poland) Zbigniew Drzewiecki
- (Switzerland) Emil Frey
- (Germany) Alfred Hoehn
- (Hungary) Imre Keeri-Szano
- (France) Lazare Lévy
- (Greece) Loris Margaritis
- (Poland) Eugeniusz Morawski-Dąbrowa
- (Soviet Union) Heinrich Neuhaus
- (Switzerland) Marie Panthès
- (France) Isidor Philipp (vice-chairman)
- (Poland) Zofia Rabcewicz
- (Poland) Lucyna Robowska
- (Germany) Richard Rössler
- (Austria) Emil von Sauer (vice-chairman)
- (Latvia) Paul Schubert
- (Hungary) Imre Stefaniai
- (Bulgaria) Andrei Stojanow
- (Poland) Stefan Śledziński
- (Poland) Józef Śmidowicz
- (Brazil) Magda Tagliaferro
- (Poland) Józef Turczyński
- (Poland) **Adam Wieniawski** (chairman)
- (Poland) Bolesław Woytowicz (secretary)
- (Poland) Jerzy Żurawlew

== IV (1949) ==
- (Sweden) Godfrid Boon
- (Belgium) Emile Bosquet
- (France) Lucette Descaves (substitute)
- (Netherlands) Sem Dresden
- (Poland) **Zbigniew Drzewiecki** (chairman)
- (Poland) Jan Ekier
- (Mexico) Blas Galindo Dimas
- (France) Lélia Gousseau (substitute)
- (England) Arthur Hedley (vice-chairman)
- (Hungary) Hernádi Lajos
- (Switzerland) Franz Josef Hirt
- (Poland) Jan Hoffman
- (Poland) Roman Jasiński
- (Poland) Marcelina Kimonti-Jacynowa (substitute)
- (France) Lazare Lévy
- (France) Marguerite Long (vice-chairwoman, after 1 October)
- (Austria) Joseph Marx
- (Czechoslovakia) Frantisek Maxian (vice-chairman)
- (Romania) Alfred Mendelssohn
- (Bulgaria) Dimitar Nenov
- (Soviet Union) Lev Oborin (vice-chairman) ( (gold) I)
- (Soviet Union) Pavel Serebryakov
- (Poland) Stanisław Szpinalski ( (silver) I)
- (Poland) Henryk Sztompka
- (Brazil) Magda Tagliaferro (vice-chairwoman)
- (Poland) Margerita Trombini-Kazuro
- (Poland) Bolesław Woytowicz
- (Italy) Carlo Zecchi
- (Poland) Jerzy Żurawlew

== V (1955) ==
- (Italy) Guido Agosti
- (Belgium) Stefan Askenase
- (Italy) Arturo Benedetti Michelangeli
- (Belgium) Émile Bosquet
- (United Kingdom) Harold Craxton (vice-chairman)
- (Poland) **Zbigniew Drzewiecki** (chairman)
- (France) Jacques Février
- (Chile) Flora Guerra
- (Socialist Federal Republic of Yugoslavia) Emil Hájek
- (Poland) Jan Hoffman
- (United Kingdom) Louis Kentner
- (France) Lazare Lévy
- (Poland) Witold Lutosławski
- (Austria) Joseph Marx
- (Czechoslovakia) František Maxián
- (Soviet Union) Lev Oborin (vice-chairman) ( (gold) I)
- (Bulgaria) Lyubomir Pipkov
- (Austria) Bruno Seidlhofer
- (East Germany) Hugo Steurer
- (China) Ma Sicong
- (Poland) Stanisław Szpinalski (secretary) ( (silver) I)
- (Poland) Henryk Sztompka
- (Poland) Józef Śmidowicz (substitute)
- (Brazil) Magda Tagliaferro (vice-chairman)
- (West Germany) Erik Then-Bergh
- (Poland) Margerita Trombini-Kazuro
- (Hungary) Imré Ungár
- (Poland) Maria Wiłkomirska (substitute)
- (Soviet Union) Yakov Zak ( (gold) III)
- (Italy) Carlo Zecchi
- (Poland) Jerzy Żurawlew

== VI (1960) ==
- Guido Agosti (Italy)
- Stefan Askenase (Belgium)
- Nadia Boulanger (vice-chairman) (France)
- Sven Brandel (Sweden)
- Sequeira Costa (Portugal)
- Harold Craxton (Great Britain)
- Halina Czerny-Stefańska (Poland, (gold) IV)
- **Zbigniew Drzewiecki** (Poland, chairman)
- Jan Ekier (Poland)
- Henri Gagnebin (Switzerland)
- Armand de Gontaut-Biron (France)
- Emil Hájek (Yugoslavia)
- Arthur Hedley (Great Britain, vice-chairman)
- Lajos Hernandi (Hungary)
- Jan Hoffman (Poland)
- Mieczysław Horszowski (USA)
- Dmitry Kabalevsky (Soviet Union, vice-chairman)
- Witold Małcużyński (Poland)
- Timo Mikkilä (Finland)
- Florica Musicescu (Romania)
- Heinrich Neuhaus (Soviet Union)
- František Rauch (Czechoslovakia)
- Reimar Riefling (Norway)
- Arthur Rubinstein (Poland, honorary chairman)
- Heinz Schroeter (West Germany)
- Bruno Seidlhofer (Austria)
- Pavel Serebryakov (Soviet Union)
- Andrej Stojanow (Bulgaria)
- Henryk Sztompka (Poland, vice-chairman)
- Magda Tagliaferro (Brazil)
- Ding Shande (China)
- Margerita Trombini-Kazuro (Poland)
- Amadeus Webersinke (East Germany)
- Beveridge Webster (USA)
- Bolesław Woytowicz (Poland, secretary)
- Yakov Zak (Soviet Union, (gold) III)
- Jerzy Żurawlew (Poland)

== VII (1965) ==
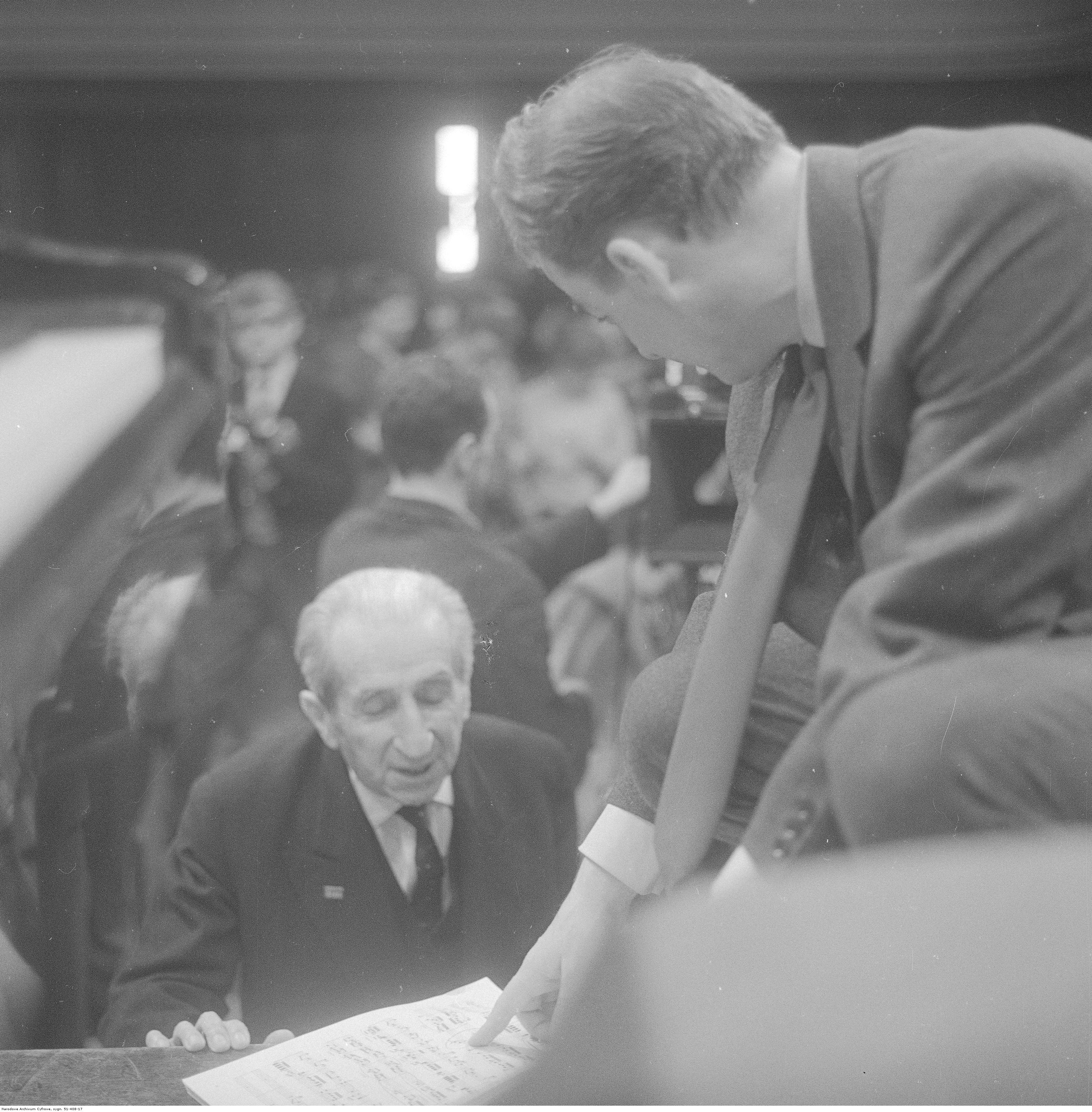
Jury chairman Zbigniew Drzewiecki in conversation with conductor Witold Rowicki during a rehearsal for the final

- (Poland) **Zbigniew Drzewiecki** (chairman)
- (Poland) Jan Ekier
- (Soviet Union) Yakov Flier (vice-chairman)
- (United Kingdom) Arthur Hedley (vice-chairman)
- (Poland) Jan Hoffman
- (Hungary) Pal Kadosa
- (United States) Eugene List
- (Socialist Federal Republic of Yugoslavia) Ivo Maček
- (Switzerland) Nikita Magaloff
- (Finland) Timo Mikkilä
- (France) Vlado Perlemuter
- (Czechoslovakia) Frantisek Rauch
- (Italy) Renzo Silvestri
- (Bulgaria) Veselin Stoyanov
- (Brazil) Magda Tagliaferro
- (Romania) Sigismund Toduță
- (Poland) Margerita Trombini-Kazuro
- (East Germany) Amadeus Webersinke
- (Poland) Maria Wiłkomirska
- (Poland) Bolesław Woytowicz
- (Poland) Jerzy Żurawlew

== VIII (1970) ==
- (Lebanon) Raif J. Abillama
- (Italy) Guido Agosti (vice-chairman)
- (Hungary) István Antal
- (Poland) Jan Ekier
- (France) Monique Haas
- (Romania) Gheorghe Halmos
- (Poland) Jan Hoffman
- (Poland) Witold Małcużyński
- (Japan) Susumu Nagai
- (Soviet Union) Tatiana Nikolayeva (vice-chairman)
- (Bulgaria) Stepanka Pelischek
- (France) Éliane Richepin
- (Mexico) Maria Teresa Rodriguez
- (East Germany) Annerose Schmidt
- (Poland) **Kazimierz Sikorski** (chairman)
- (Poland) Regina Smendzianka
- (Czechoslovakia) Pavel Štěpán
- (Poland) Zbigniew Szymonowicz (secretary)
- (Poland) Bolesław Woytowicz

== IX (1975) ==
- (Hungary) István Antal
- (Poland) Olga Iliwicka-Dąbrowska
- (Bulgaria) Anton Dikov
- (Poland) Jan Ekier
- (Italy) Orazio Frugoni
- (Romania) Gheorghe Halmos
- (West Germany) Ludwig Hoffmann
- (Japan) Akiko Iguchi
- (Poland) Andrzej Jasiński
- (Austria) Alexander Jenner
- (United Kingdom) Louis Kentner
- (United States) Eugene List (vice-chairman)
- (Soviet Union) Yevgeny Malinin (vice-chairman)
- (Poland) Witold Małcużyński
- (Switzerland) André-François Marescotti
- (Spain) Federico Mompou
- (Czechoslovakia) Frantisek Rauch
- (France) Bernard Ringeissen
- (Poland) **Kazimierz Sikorski** (chairman)
- (Poland) Zbigniew Szymonowicz
- (Poland) Zbigniew Śliwiński
- (East Germany) Amadeus Webersinke
- (Poland) Tadeusz Żmudziński

== X (1980) ==
- (Argentina) Martha Argerich ( (gold) VII)
- (Austria) Paul Badura-Skoda
- (Italy) Rodolfo Caporali
- (Spain) Josep Colom
- (Poland) Halina Czerny-Stefańska ( (gold) IV)
- (Soviet Union) Sergei Dorensky
- (Poland) Jan Ekier
- (Bulgaria) Liuba Enczewa
- (East Germany) Rudolf Fischer
- (Poland) Lidia Grychtołówna
- (Canada) Iving Heller
- (Australia) Rex Hobcroft
- (West Germany) Ludwig Hoffmann
- (Poland) Andrzej Jasiński
- (France) Geneviève Joy
- (United Kingdom) Louis Kentner
- (Poland) **Kazimierz Kord** (chairman)
- (United States) Eugene List
- (Switzerland) Nikita Magaloff (vice-chairman)
- (Czechoslovakia) Frantisek Rauch (vice-chairman)
- (Poland) Regina Smendzianka
- (Hungary) Péter Solymos
- (Poland) Zbigniew Śliwiński
- (Japan) Kazuko Yasukawa
- (Poland) Tadeusz Żmudziński

== XI (1985) ==
- (United States) Edward Auer
- (Poland) Halina Czerny-Stefańska ( (gold) IV)
- (Poland) **Jan Ekier** (chairman)
- (Bulgaria) Konstantin Ganew
- (Romania) Valentin Gheorghiu
- (Poland) Lidia Grychtołówna
- (Poland) Barbara Hesse-Bukowska ( (silver) IV)
- (Poland) Andrzej Jasiński
- (West Germany) Karl-Heinz Kämmerling
- (Soviet Union) Victor Merzhanov (vice-chairman)
- (Poland) Piotr Paleczny
- (East Germany) Karl-Heinz Pick
- (Czechoslovakia) Frantisek Rauch
- (France) Bernard Ringeissen
- (Japan) Takahiro Sonoda
- (Belgium) Eugène Traey (vice-chairman)
- (United Kingdom) Fou Ts'ong ( (bronze) V)
- (United States) Charles H. Webb
- (Soviet Union) Lev Vlassenko
- (Poland) Tadeusz Żmudziński

== XII (1990) ==
- (Soviet Union) Vladimir Ashkenazy ( (silver) V)
- (Poland) Ryszard Bakst
- (Poland) Halina Czerny-Stefańska ( (gold) IV)
- (People's Republic of Bulgaria) Anton Dikov
- (Soviet Union) Sergei Dorensky
- (Poland) **Jan Ekier** (chairman)
- (United States) Leon Fleisher
- (Poland) Lidia Grychtołówna
- (Poland) Barbara Hesse-Bukowska ( (silver) IV)
- (Poland) Andrzej Jasiński
- (Luxembourg) Cyprien Katsaris
- (Czechoslovakia) Ivan Klánský
- (Japan) Hiroko Nakamura
- (West Germany) Gerhard Oppitz
- (Poland) Piotr Paleczny
- (France) Bernard Ringeissen
- (Italy) Maria Tipo
- (Belgium) Eugène Traey (vice chairman)
- (Soviet Union) Lev Vlassenko (vice chairman)
- (Japan) Kazuko Yasukawa
- (Poland) Tadeusz Żmudziński

== XIII (1995) ==
- (Austria) Paul Badura-Skoda (vice-chairman)
- (Poland) Halina Czerny-Stefańska ( (gold) IV)
- (Russia) Bella Davidovich ( (gold) IV)
- (Switzerland) Jean-Jacques Eigeldinger
- (Poland) **Jan Ekier** (chairman)
- (Poland) Lidia Grychtołówna
- (Poland) Adam Harasiewicz ( (gold) V)
- (Poland) Barbara Hesse-Bukowska ( (silver) IV)
- (Poland) Andrzej Jasiński
- (Czech Republic) Ivan Klánský
- (Japan) Hitoshi Kobayashi
- (Canada) Lee Kum-Sing
- (France) Dominique Merlet
- (Russia) Victor Merzhanov
- (China) Ming-Qiang Li
- (Japan) Hiroko Nakamura
- (Poland) Piotr Paleczny (vice-chairman)
- (Italy) Sergio Perticaroli
- (Germany) Edith Picht-Axenfeld
- (France) Bernard Ringeissen
- (United States) Harold C. Schonberg
- (Poland) Regina Smendzianka
- (Poland) Zbigniew Sliwinski
- (Israel) Arie Vardi

== XIV (2000) ==
- (Argentina) Martha Argerich (joined during Stage II) ( (gold) VII)
- (United States) Edward Auer
- (Austria) Paul Badura-Skoda
- (Brazil) Arnaldo Cohen
- (United States) (Portugal) Sequeira Costa
- (Poland) Halina Czerny-Stefańska ( (gold) IV)
- (Japan) Ikuko Endo
- (Poland) Kazimierz Gierzod
- (Poland) Lidia Grychtołówna
- (Poland) Adam Harasiewicz ( (gold) V)
- (United States) Eugen Indjic
- (Poland) **Andrzej Jasiński** (chairman)
- (Czechoslovakia) Ivan Klánský
- (Russia) Victor Merzhanov
- (France) Germaine Mounier
- (Japan) Hiroko Nakamura
- (Poland) Piotr Paleczny (vice-chairman)
- (Italy) Sergio Perticaroli
- (France) Bernard Ringeissen (vice-chairman)
- (Germany) Annerose Schmidt
- (Poland) Regina Smendzianka
- (Poland) Józef Stompel
- (Israel) Arie Vardi

== XV (2005) ==
- (Russia) Vera Gornostayeva
- (Poland) Lidia Grychtołówna
- (Poland) Adam Harasiewicz ( (gold) V)
- (Poland) Krzysztof Jabłoński
- (Poland) **Andrzej Jasiński** (chairman)
- (South Korea) Choong-Mo Kang
- (Russia) Vladimir Krainev
- (Japan) Hiroko Nakamura
- (Republic of Ireland) John O'Conor
- (Poland) Janusz Olejniczak
- (Poland) Piotr Paleczny (vice-chairman)
- (United States) John Perry
- (Italy) Sergio Perticaroli
- (Poland) Ewa Pobłocka (5th X)
- (France) Bernard Ringeissen
- (Poland) Regina Smendzianka
- (Poland) Józef Stompel
- (Vietnam) (Canada) Đặng Thái Sơn ( (gold) X)
- (Israel) Arie Vardi
- (United Kingdom) Fanny Waterman
- (China) Zhou Guangren

== XVI (2010) ==
- (Argentina) Martha Argerich ( (gold) VII)
- (United States) Bella Davidovich ( (gold) IV)
- (Poland) Jan Ekier (honorary chairman)
- (France) Philippe Entremont
- (Brazil) Nelson Freire
- (Poland) Adam Harasiewicz ( (gold) V)
- (Poland) **Andrzej Jasiński** (chairman)
- (United States) Kevin Kenner ( (silver) XII)
- (Japan) Michie Koyama
- (Poland) Piotr Paleczny (vice-chairman)
- (Poland) Katarzyna Popowa-Zydroń
- (Vietnam) (Canada) Đặng Thái Sơn ( (gold) X)
- (United Kingdom) Fou Ts'ong ( (bronze) V)

== XVII (2015) ==
- (Russia) Dmitri Alexeev
- (Argentina) Martha Argerich ( (gold) VII)
- (Japan) Akiko Ebi (5th X)
- (Vietnam) (Canada) Đặng Thái Sơn ( (gold) X)
- (France) Philippe Entremont
- (Argentina) Nelson Goerner
- (Poland) Adam Harasiewicz ( (gold) V)
- (Poland) Andrzej Jasiński
- (China) Li Yundi ( (gold) XIV)
- (United States) Garrick Ohlsson( (gold) VIII)
- (Poland) Janusz Olejniczak (6th VIII)
- (Poland) Piotr Paleczny (3rd VIII)
- (Poland) Ewa Pobłocka (5th X)
- (Poland) **Katarzyna Popowa-Zydroń** (chairwoman); (HM IX)
- (United States) John Rink
- (Poland) Wojciech Świtała
- (Latvia) Dina Joffe ( (silver) IX)

== XVIII (2021) ==
- (Russia) Dmitri Alexeev
- (China) Sa Chen (4th XIV)
- (Vietnam) (Canada) Đặng Thái Sơn ( (gold) X)
- (Japan) Akiko Ebi (5th X)
- (France) Philippe Giusiano ( (silver) XIII)
- (Argentina) Nelson Goerner (HM XIII)
- (Poland) Adam Harasiewicz ( (gold) V)
- (Poland) Krzysztof Jabłoński ( (bronze) XI)
- (United States) Kevin Kenner ( (silver) XII)
- (Brazil) Arthur Moreira Lima ( (silver) VII)
- (Poland) Janusz Olejniczak (6th VIII)
- (Poland) Piotr Paleczny ( (bronze) VIII)
- (Poland) Ewa Pobłocka (5th X)
- (Poland) **Katarzyna Popowa-Zydroń** (chairwoman; HM IX)
- (United States) John Rink
- (Poland) Wojciech Świtała (HM XII)
- (Latvia) Dina Joffe ( (silver) IX)

== XIX (2025) ==
- (South Africa) John Allison
- (Russia) Yulianna Avdeeva ( (gold) XVI)
- (France) Michel Beroff
- (Japan) Akiko Ebi (5th X)
- (China) Sa Chen (4th XIV)
- (Vietnam) (Canada) Đặng Thái Sơn ( (gold) X)
- (Argentina) Nelson Goerner (HM XIII)
- (Japan) Momo Kodama
- (Poland) Krzysztof Jabłoński ( (bronze) XI)
- (United States) Kevin Kenner ( (silver) XII)
- (United States) Robert McDonald
- (United States) **Garrick Ohlsson** (chairman; (gold) VIII)
- (Poland) Piotr Paleczny ( (bronze) VIII)
- (Poland) Ewa Pobłocka (5th X)
- (Poland) Katarzyna Popowa-Zydroń (HM IX)
- (United States) John Rink
- (Poland) Wojciech Świtała (HM XII)
