= XI International Chopin Piano Competition =

Piano competition (1985)

The Eleventh International Fryderyk Chopin Piano Competition
- Date: 30 September – 20 October 1985
- Venue: National Philharmonic, Warsaw
- Hosted by: Fryderyk Chopin Society
- Winner: (Soviet Union) Stanislav Bunin

The XI International Chopin Piano Competition (Polish: XI Międzynarodowy Konkurs Pianistyczny im. Fryderyka Chopina) was held from 30 September to 20 October 1985 in Warsaw.

For the first time, participants could choose to play on a Kawai or on a Yamaha piano, in addition to the Steinway and Bösendorfer that had been available before. Bechstein withdrew from the competition after its instrument was chosen just once during the 9th competition.

== Awards ==
The competition consisted of three stages and a final.

The following prizes were awarded:

Prize	Winner	
1st place, gold medalist(s)	Stanislav Bunin	Soviet Union
2nd place, silver medalist(s)	Marc Laforet	France
3rd place, bronze medalist(s)	Krzysztof Jabłoński	Poland
4th	Michie Koyama	Japan
5th	Jean-Marc Luisada	France
6th	Tatyana Pikayzen	Soviet Union
HM	Ljudmił Angełow	Bulgaria
HM	Ivari Ilja	Soviet Union
HM	Francois Killian	France
HM	Kayo Miki	Japan

Three special prizes were awarded:

Special prize	Winner	
Best Performance of a Concerto	Stanislav Bunin	Soviet Union
Best Performance of Mazurkas	Marc Laforet	France
Best Performance of a Polonaise	Stanislav Bunin	Soviet Union

== Jury ==
The jury consisted of:

- (United States) Edward Auer
- (Poland) Halina Czerny-Stefańska ( (gold) IV)
- (Poland) Jan Ekier (chairman)
- (Bulgaria) Konstantin Ganew
- (Romania) Valentin Gheorghiu
- (Poland) Lidia Grychtołówna
- (Poland) Barbara Hesse-Bukowska ( (silver) IV)
- (Poland) Andrzej Jasiński
- (West Germany) Karl-Heinz Kämmerling
- (Soviet Union) Victor Merzhanov (vice-chairman)
- (Poland) Piotr Paleczny
- (East Germany) Karl-Heinz Pick
- (Czechoslovakia) Frantisek Rauch
- (France) Bernard Ringeissen
- (Japan) Takahiro Sonoda
- (Belgium) Eugène Traey (vice-chairman)
- (United Kingdom) Fou Ts'ong ( (bronze) V)
- (United States) Charles H. Webb
- (Soviet Union) Lev Vlassenko
- (Poland) Tadeusz Żmudziński

Guido Agosti and Arthur Moreira Lima resigned just before the competition.

Fou Ts'ong protested against the awarding of First Prize to Stanislav Bunin by not turning up for the jury's last session and refusing to sign the verdict.
