= VIII International Chopin Piano Competition =

Piano competition (1970)

The Eighth International Fryderyk Chopin Piano Competition
- Date: 6–25 October 1970
- Venue: National Philharmonic, Warsaw
- Hosted by: Fryderyk Chopin Society
- Winner: (United States) Garrick Ohlsson

The VIII International Chopin Piano Competition (Polish: VIII Międzynarodowy Konkurs Pianistyczny im. Fryderyka Chopina) was held from 6 to 25 October 1970 in Warsaw. The competition was won by Garrick Ohlsson of the United States, becoming the first American winner.

This was the first competition that was held in October; previous competitions had been held in February.

== Awards ==
The competition consisted of two elimination stages and a final with twelve pianists.

The following prizes were awarded:

Prize		Winner	
1st	40,000zł	Garrick Ohlsson	United States
2nd	30,000zł	Mitsuko Uchida	Japan
3rd	25,000zł	Piotr Paleczny	Poland
4th	20,000zł	Eugen Indjic	United States
5th	15,000zł	Natalya Gavrilova	Soviet Union
6th	10,000zł	Janusz Olejniczak	Poland
HM	5,000zł	Emanuel Ax	United States
HM	5,000zł	Ikuko Endo	Japan
HM	5,000zł	Ivan Klánský	Czechoslovakia
HM	5,000zł	Alain Neveux	France
HM	5,000zł	Karol Nicze	Poland
HM	5,000zł	Irina Smolina	Soviet Union

Two special prizes were awarded:

Special prize		Winner	
Best Performance of Mazurkas	10,000zł	Garrick Ohlsson	United States
Best Performance of a Polonaise	10,000zł	Piotr Paleczny	Poland

== Jury ==
The jury consisted of:

- (Lebanon) Raif J. Abillama
- (Italy) Guido Agosti (vice-chairman)
- (Hungary) István Antal
- (Poland) Jan Ekier
- (France) Monique Haas
- (Romania) Gheorghe Halmos
- (Poland) Jan Hoffman
- (Poland) Witold Małcużyński
- (Japan) Susumu Nagai
- (Soviet Union) Tatiana Nikolayeva (vice-chairman)
- (Bulgaria) Stepanka Pelischek
- (France) Éliane Richepin
- (Mexico) Maria Teresa Rodriguez
- (East Germany) Annerose Schmidt
- (Poland) Kazimierz Sikorski (chairman)
- (Poland) Regina Smendzianka
- (Czechoslovakia) Pavel Štěpán
- (Poland) Zbigniew Szymonowicz (secretary)
- (Poland) Bolesław Woytowicz

Leon Fleisher (USA) resigned just before the competition due to an illness.
