= IV International Chopin Piano Competition =

Piano competition (1949)

The Fourth International Fryderyk Chopin Piano Competition
- Date: 15 September – 15 October 1949
- Venue: Roma Theatre, Warsaw
- Hosted by: Polish Ministry of Culture and Art
- Winner: (Poland) Halina Czerny-Stefańska; (Soviet Union) Bella Davidovich

The IV International Chopin Piano Competition (Polish: IV Międzynarodowy Konkurs Pianistyczny im. Fryderyka Chopina) was held from 15 September to 15 October 1949 in Warsaw. The first competition after World War II, it was held in connection with the centenary of Chopin's death. Polish pianist Halina Czerny-Stefańska and Soviet pianist Bella Davidovich shared first place. Due to the wartime destruction of the National Philharmonic, the auditions were held at the Roma Theatre on Nowogrodzka Street.

== Awards ==
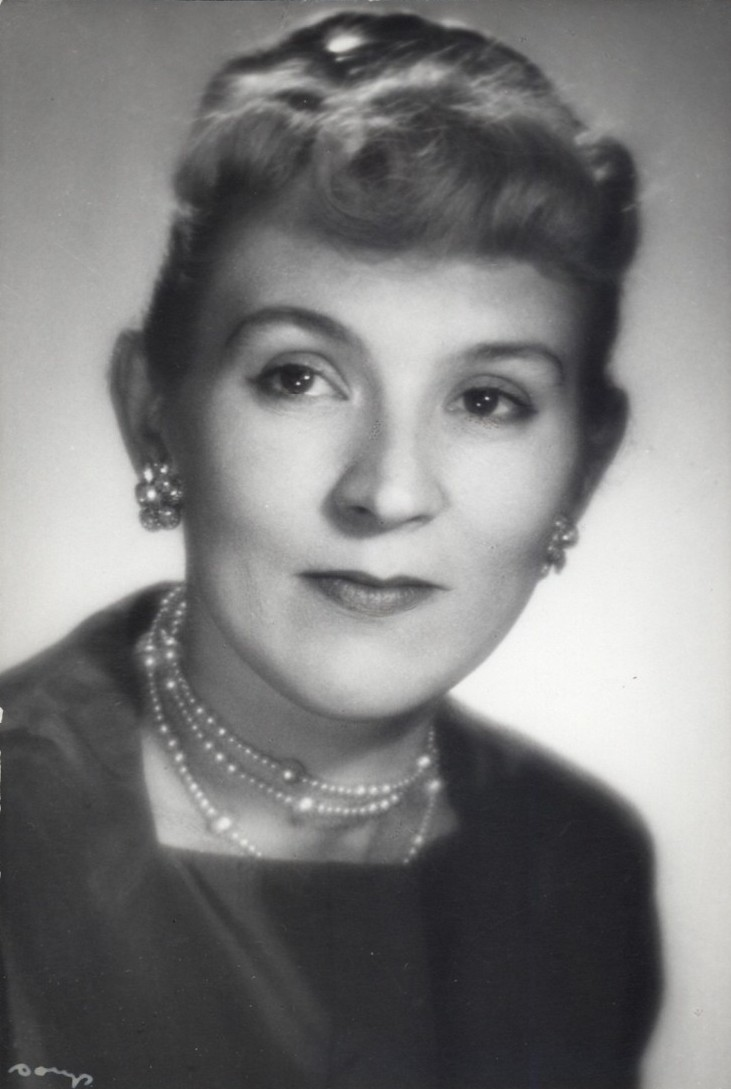
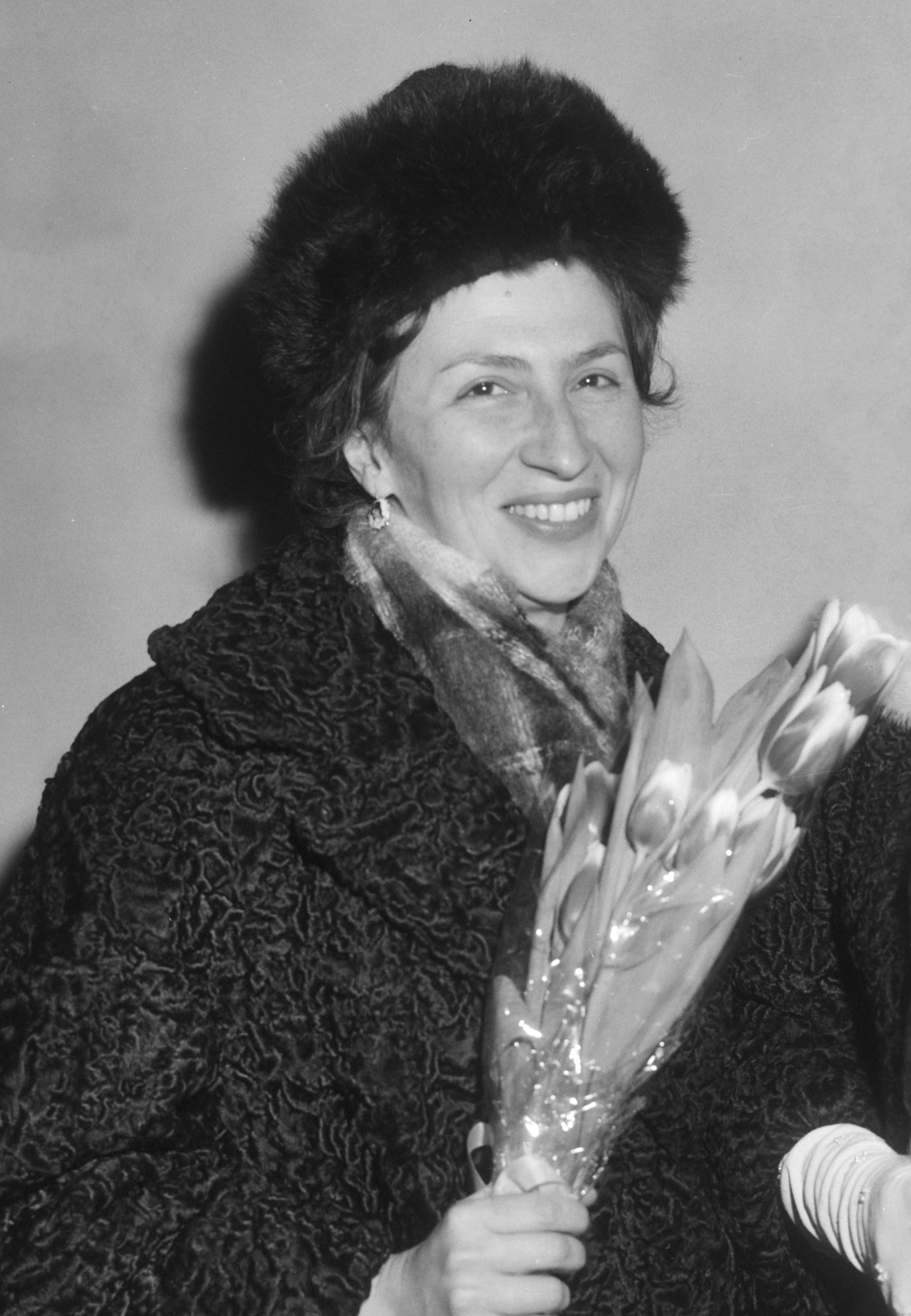
Halina Czerny-Stefańska (1959) and Bella Davidovich (1966)

The competition consisted of two elimination stages and a final with 18 pianists. For the first time, competitors performed a piano concerto in its entirety in the final, as opposed to just two movements.

The following prizes were awarded:

Prize		Winner	
1st	1,000,000zł	Halina Czerny-Stefańska	Poland
1st	1,000,000zł	Bella Davidovich	Soviet Union
2nd	800,000zł	Barbara Hesse-Bukowska	Poland
3rd	600,000zł	Waldemar Maciszewski	Poland
4th	550,000zł	Georgy Muravlov	Soviet Union
5th	500,000zł	Władysław Kędra	Poland
6th	450,000zł	Ryszard Bakst	Poland
7th	400,000zł	Yevgeny Malinin	Soviet Union
8th	350,000zł	Zbigniew Szymonowicz	Poland
9th	300,000zł	Tamara Gusiewa	Soviet Union
10th	250,000zł	Victor Merzhanov	Soviet Union
11th	200,000zł	Regina Smendzianka	Poland
12th	150,000zł	Tadeusz Żmudziński	Poland
HM	50,000zł	Tony Vine Adnet	Brazil
HM	50,000zł	Oriano de Almeida	Brazil
HM	50,000zł	Carlos Rivero	Mexico
HM	50,000zł	Ludmila Sosina	Soviet Union
HM	50,000zł	Imre Szendrei	Hungary

One special prize was awarded:

Special prize	Winner	
Best Performance of Mazurkas	Halina Czerny-Stefańska	Poland

== Jury ==
The jury consisted of:

- (Sweden) Godfrid Boon
- (Belgium) Emile Bosquet
- (France) Lucette Descaves (substitute)
- (Netherlands) Sem Dresden
- (Poland) Zbigniew Drzewiecki (chairman)
- (Poland) Jan Ekier
- (Mexico) Blas Galindo Dimas
- (France) Lélia Gousseau (substitute)
- (England) Arthur Hedley (vice-chairman)
- (Hungary) Lajos Hernádi
- (Switzerland) Franz Josef Hirt
- (Poland) Jan Hoffman
- (Poland) Roman Jasiński
- (Poland) Marcelina Kimonti-Jacynowa (substitute)
- (France) Lazare Lévy
- (France) Marguerite Long (vice-chairwoman, after 1 October)
- (Austria) Joseph Marx
- (Czechoslovakia) Frantisek Maxian (vice-chairman)
- (Romania) Alfred Mendelssohn
- (Bulgaria) Dimitar Nenov
- (Soviet Union) Lev Oborin (vice-chairman) ( (gold) I)
- (Soviet Union) Pavel Serebryakov
- (Poland) Stanisław Szpinalski ( (silver) I)
- (Poland) Henryk Sztompka
- (Brazil) Magda Tagliaferro (vice-chairwoman)
- (Poland) Margerita Trombini-Kazuro
- (Poland) Bolesław Woytowicz
- (Italy) Carlo Zecchi
- (Poland) Jerzy Żurawlew

During the first two rounds, blind auditions were held, with participants competing anonymously under numbers they had drawn, as the jury listened behind wooden shutters. This format was not repeated again in subsequent editions of the competition.
