= IX International Chopin Piano Competition =

Piano competition (1975)

The Ninth International Fryderyk Chopin Piano Competition
- Date: 6–29 October 1975
- Venue: National Philharmonic, Warsaw
- Hosted by: Fryderyk Chopin Society
- Winner: (Poland) Krystian Zimerman

The IX International Chopin Piano Competition (Polish: IX Międzynarodowy Konkurs Pianistyczny im. Fryderyka Chopina) was held from 6 to 29 October 1975 in Warsaw. The competition was won by Krystian Zimerman of Poland, the youngest winner to that date at the age of 18.

== Awards ==
The competition consisted of three elimination stages and a final with seven pianists.

For the first time, the first three places were presented with gold, silver, and bronze medals respectively, designed by Józef Markiewicz and produced by the Polish Mint.

The following prizes were awarded:

Prize	Winner	
1st place, gold medalist(s)	Krystian Zimerman	Poland
2nd place, silver medalist(s)	Dina Joffe	Soviet Union
3rd place, bronze medalist(s)	Tatyana Fedkina	Soviet Union
4th	Pavel Gililov	Soviet Union
5th	Dean Kramer	United States
6th	Diana Kacso	Brazil
HM	Dan Atanasiu	Romania
HM	John Hendrickson	Canada
HM	Neal Larrabee	United States
HM	Katarzyna Popowa-Zydroń	Poland
HM	Elżbieta Tarnawska	Poland
HM	Alexander Urwałow	Soviet Union
HM	Wiktor Wasiliew	Soviet Union
HM	William Wolfram	United States

Two special prizes were awarded:

Special prize	Winner	
Best Performance of Mazurkas	Krystian Zimerman	Poland
Best Performance of a Polonaise	Krystian Zimerman	Poland

== Jury ==
The jury consisted of:

- (Hungary) István Antal
- (Poland) Olga Iliwicka-Dąbrowska
- (Bulgaria) Anton Dikov
- (Poland) Jan Ekier
- (Italy) Orazio Frugoni
- (Romania) Gheorghe Halmos
- (West Germany) Ludwig Hoffmann
- (Japan) Akiko Iguchi
- (Poland) Andrzej Jasiński
- (Austria) Alexander Jenner
- (United Kingdom) Louis Kentner
- (United States) Eugene List (vice-chairman)
- (Soviet Union) Yevgeny Malinin (vice-chairman)
- (Poland) Witold Małcużyński
- (Switzerland) André-François Marescotti
- (Spain) Federico Mompou
- (Czechoslovakia) Frantisek Rauch
- (France) Bernard Ringeissen
- (Poland) Kazimierz Sikorski (chairman)
- (Poland) Zbigniew Szymonowicz
- (Poland) Zbigniew Śliwiński
- (East Germany) Amadeus Webersinke
- (Poland) Tadeusz Żmudziński
