= V International Chopin Piano Competition =

Piano competition (1955)

The Fifth International Fryderyk Chopin Piano Competition
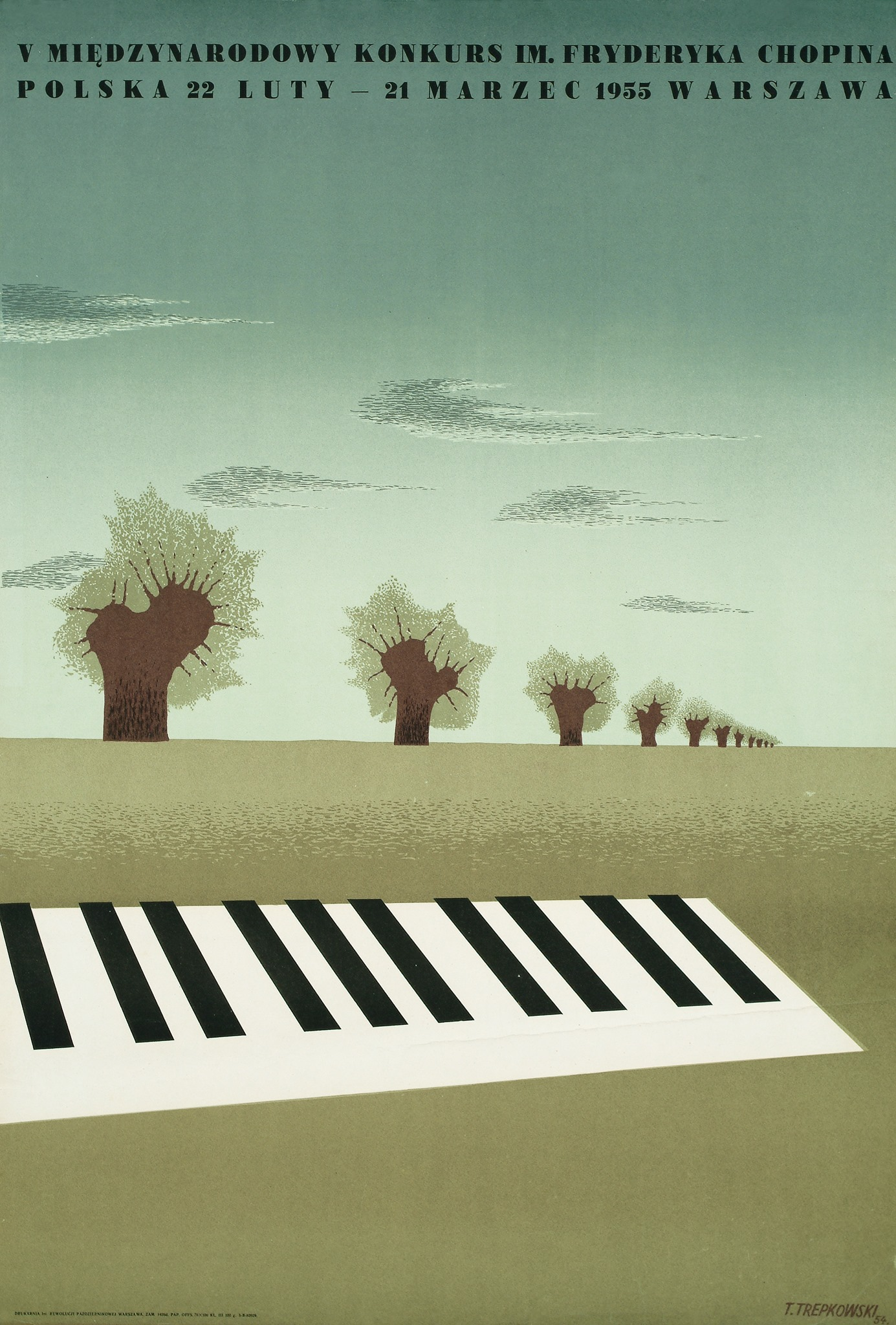
- Date: 21 February – 20 March 1955
- Venue: National Philharmonic, Warsaw
- Hosted by: Polish Ministry of Culture and Art
- Winner: (Poland) Adam Harasiewicz

The V International Chopin Piano Competition (Polish: V Międzynarodowy Konkurs Pianistyczny im. Fryderyka Chopina) was held from 21 February to 20 March 1955 in Warsaw. The competition was won by Adam Harasiewicz of Poland.

The competition was held in the rebuilt National Philharmonic, the date having been moved from October 1954 to February 1955, temporarily increasing the gap between two competitions to six years. Competitors were accommodated in the Hotel Polonia, where 70 practice pianos were installed.

== Awards ==
The competition consisted of three elimination stages, with 74, 41 and 21 pianists respectively. Vladimir Ashkenazy was considered the favorite up until the final stage, where he performed less strongly, ultimately coming in second after Adam Harasiewicz.

The following prizes were awarded:

Prize		Winner	
1st	30,000zł	Adam Harasiewicz	Poland
2nd	25,000zł	Vladimir Ashkenazy	Soviet Union
3rd	20,000zł	Fou Ts'ong	China
4th	18,000zł	Bernard Ringeissen	France
5th	16,000zł	Naum Shtarkman	Soviet Union
6th	14,000zł	Dmitry Paperno	Soviet Union
7th	12,000zł	Lidia Grychtołówna	Poland
8th	10,000zł	André Tchaikowsky	Poland
9th	9,000zł	Dmitry Sakharov	Soviet Union
10th	8,000zł	Kiyoko Tanaka	Japan
HM	5,000zł	Emi Béhar	Bulgaria
HM	5,000zł	Monique Duphil	France
HM	5,000zł	Peter Frankl	Hungary
HM	5,000zł	Stanislav Knor	Czechoslovakia
HM	5,000zł	Edwin Kowalik	Poland
HM	5,000zł	Nina Lelczuk	Soviet Union
HM	5,000zł	Miłosz Magin	Poland
HM	5,000zł	Annerose Schmidt	East Germany
HM	5,000zł	Irina Sijalova	Soviet Union
HM	5,000zł	Tamás Vásáry	Hungary

One special prize was awarded:

Special prize		Winner	
Best Performance of Mazurkas	10,000zł	Fou Ts'ong	China

== Jury ==
The jury consisted of:

- (Italy) Guido Agosti
- (Belgium) Stefan Askenase
- (Italy) Arturo Benedetti Michelangeli
- (Belgium) Émile Bosquet
- (United Kingdom) Harold Craxton (vice-chairman)
- (Poland) Zbigniew Drzewiecki (chairman)
- (France) Jacques Février
- (Chile) Flora Guerra
- (Socialist Federal Republic of Yugoslavia) Emil Hájek
- (Poland) Jan Hoffman
- (United Kingdom) Louis Kentner
- (France) Lazare Lévy
- (Poland) Witold Lutosławski
- (Austria) Joseph Marx
- (Czechoslovakia) František Maxián
- (Soviet Union) Lev Oborin (vice-chairman) ( (gold) I)
- (Bulgaria) Lyubomir Pipkov
- (Austria) Bruno Seidlhofer
- (East Germany) Hugo Steurer
- (China) Ma Sicong
- (Poland) Stanisław Szpinalski (secretary) ( (silver) I)
- (Poland) Henryk Sztompka
- (Poland) Józef Śmidowicz (substitute)
- (Brazil) Magda Tagliaferro (vice-chairman)
- (West Germany) Erik Then-Bergh
- (Poland) Margerita Trombini-Kazuro
- (Hungary) Imré Ungár
- (Poland) Maria Wiłkomirska (substitute)
- (Soviet Union) Yakov Zak ( (gold) III)
- (Italy) Carlo Zecchi
- (Poland) Jerzy Żurawlew

For the first time, the jury did not sit on the stage, but on the balcony of the auditorium, where it has remained since.
