= Aleksander Michałowski =

Polish pianist, pedagogue and composer (1851–1938)

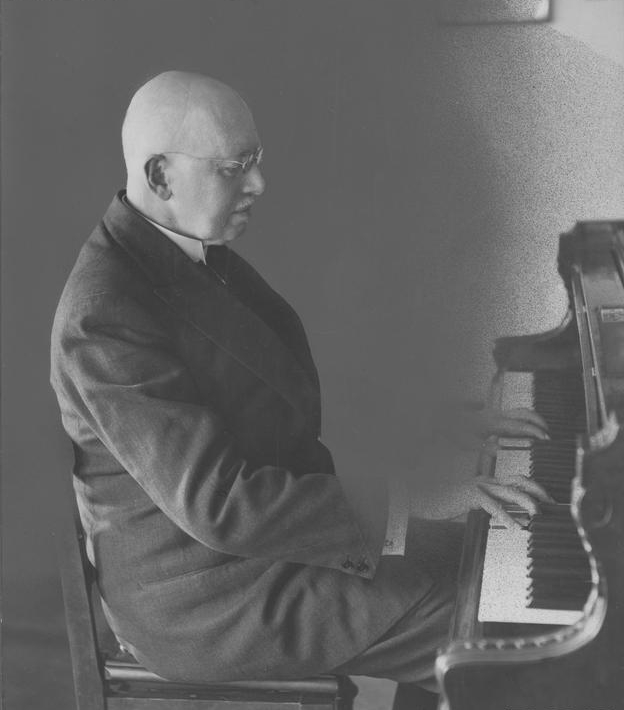
- Born: 17 May 1851 (O.S. 5 May); Kamianets-Podilskyi, Russian Empire
- Died: 17 October 1938 (aged 87); Warsaw, Poland
- Occupations: Pianist; pedagogue; composer

Aleksander Michałowski (17 May [O.S. 5 May] 1851 – 17 October 1938) was a Polish pianist, pedagogue, and composer.

== Early life and education ==
Michałowski was born in 1851 in Kamianets-Podilskyi, in present-day Ukraine, then part of the Russian Empire. He started taking piano lessons at the age of 6. In 1867, at the age of 16, he enrolled at the Leipzig Conservatory as a pupil of Ignaz Moscheles, Carl Reinecke, and Theodor Coccius. Two years later, he traveled to Berlin, where he studied under Polish pianist Carl Tausig. In 1870, he settled down in Warsaw, and he began his teaching career in 1874.

Around that time, Michałowski befriended and studied with Karol Mikuli, who had received lessons from Frédéric Chopin between 1844 and 1848. Mikuli later went on to become head of the Lviv Conservatory. Mikuli shared many of Chopin's ideas and traditions with Michałowski. Michałowski also met Princess Marcelina Czartoryska, a fellow pupil of Chopin, who played some mazurkas for him. His teacher, Moscheles, had also been a friend of Chopin's.

== Artistic style ==
Michałowski is often known as an interpreter of Chopin's piano works. In performances, he sometimes introduced personal alterations and transcriptions in the style of Moriz Rosenthal. In 1878, he visited Franz Liszt in Weimar. Initially unwelcome due to his Leipzig Conservatory training, Michałowski ultimately impressed Liszt with his performance, earning praise for his stylistic authenticity and interpretive creativity.

Zbigniew Drzewiecki, one of Michałowski’s successors in Warsaw, wrote:

"As an interpreter of Chopin, he created a certain style of rendering the composer's works which found many imitators. It consisted of the chiseling of swift passages and stressing their elegance in smoothing the edges of sharper expressive climaxes, in lending Chopin's works the air of almost drawing-room sentimentality. And yet, this slight sentimentality was always under the strict control of moderation, instrumental purity, and good taste."

== Teaching principles ==
Michałowski began teaching privately in 1874. In 1891, he became a professor of the concert pianists' class at the Warsaw Institute of Music under the direction of Apollinaire de Kontski. He remained there until 1918, after which he taught at the Fryderyk Chopin Music School of the Warsaw Music Society. As a teacher, he placed particular emphasis on the importance of contrapuntal playing. During the first two years of his students' work with him, Michałowski required them to study J.S. Bach's contrapuntal keyboard works. For one of his students, Wanda Landowska, the emphasis on contrapuntal principles in Chopin's and Bach's music inspired her to focus her career on Bach and Baroque music. Michałowski also encouraged his students to develop the imaginative and bravura aspects of their playing. He often demonstrated his own technique and style during lessons, and encouraged students to imitate aspects of his performance.

== Students and successors ==
The careers of some of his students were interrupted by the two World Wars, and in some cases ended their work. Among them was Jerzy Żurawlew, who founded the International Chopin Piano Competitions in 1927. Wanda Landowska was not only forced to flee the Nazis, but also had her musical collection confiscated. Róża Etkin-Moszkowska was killed in the German retreat from Warsaw in 1944.

Henryk Pachulski and Piotr Maszyński were among his earlier pupils, while later ones included Stanislaw Urstein, Edwarda Chojnacka, Wiktor Chapowicki, Józef Śmidowicz, Mischa Levitzki, Vladimir Sofronitsky, Jadwiga Sarnecka, and Bolesław Woytowicz. Heinrich Neuhaus, a teacher whose pupils included Sviatoslav Richter, Emil Gilels, Yaacov Zak, and Ryszard Bakst, received lessons from Michałowski. Professor Karol Radziwonowicz also lists Stefania Allina, Zofia Buckiewiczowa, Janina Familier Hepner, Zofia Frankiewicz, Stefania Niekrasz, Stanislaw Nawrocki, Ludomir Różycki, Piotr Rytel, Henryk Schulz-Evler, Władysław Szpilman, Juliusz Wolfsohn, and Alexander Zakin as Michałowski's pupils.

Bolesław Kon was a pupil who also studied with Konstantin Igumnov. Jerzy Lefeld became Michałowski's amanuensis, transcribing for him.

Józef Turczyński, his immediate successor at Warsaw, and Zbigniew Drzewiecki were not his students but continued the tradition of his work as leading teachers of the Polish school.

== Later career ==
Michałowski was also a chamber musician, performing duos with the violinist Stanisław Barcewicz and trios with Barcewicz and the cellist Aleksandr Verzhbilovich.

He composed 35 piano works, which are mostly shorter pieces, and produced an instructional edition of Chopin’s compositions.

He recorded extensively and made a large number of gramophone records, recorded in three different periods: the first around 1906, the second around 1918, and the last in the 1930s.

Although Michałowski was known as a concert performer, his focus shifted increasingly toward teaching after his sight began to fail rapidly in 1912. At the encouragement of his colleague, Madame Ruszczycówna, he later returned to the concert stage, giving numerous performances in the following years. In 1919, he marked the 50th anniversary of his debut with a series of concerts. In 1929, he performed both Chopin concerti in a single concert. Michałowski died in Warsaw on 17 October 1938, at the age of 87.

== Discography ==
=== As performer ===
- 1905: Gramophone & Typewriter – Chopin: Étude op. 10/5, Polonaise op. 40/1, Waltz op. 64/2, Préludes op. 28/7, op. 28/20; Chopin-Michałowski: Waltz op. 64/1; Liszt-Chopin: My Joys; Liszt: Soirée de Vienne S. 427/6; Mendelssohn: Songs without words op. 19/3
- 1912: Gramophone – Chopin: Waltz op. 64/2, Étude op. 10/11

=== As composer ===
- 2016: Acte Préalable AP0365 – Aleksander Michałowski - Piano Works 1 (Artur Cimirro)

== See also ==
- List of Poles
- List of Polish composers

== Sources ==
- Arthur Eaglefield Hull, A Dictionary of Modern Music and Musicians (Dent, London 1924).
- J. Methuen-Campbell, Chopin Playing from the Composer to the Present Day (Gollancz, London 1981).
- H.C. Schonberg, The Great Pianists (Gollancz, London 1964).
