= Janusz Olejniczak =

Polish classical pianist and actor (1952–2024)

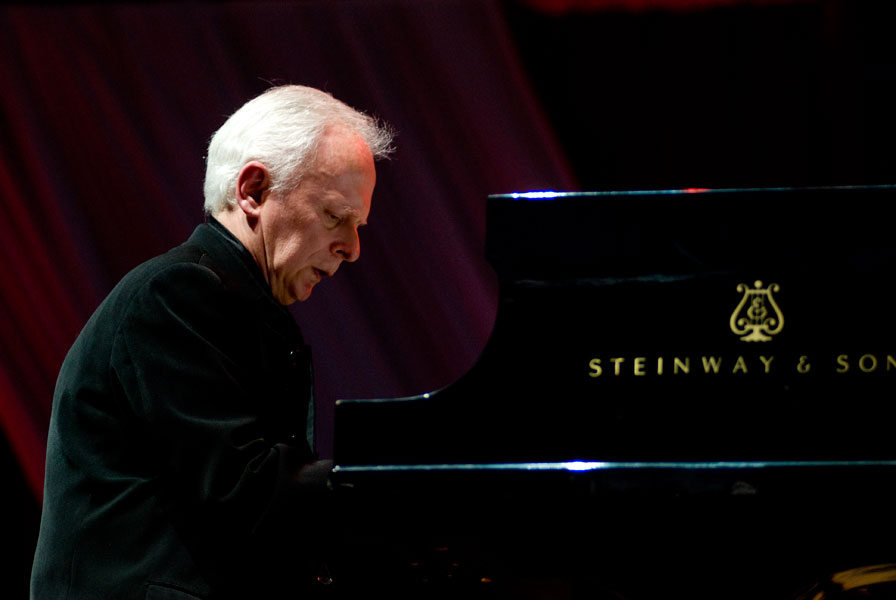
- Olejniczak playing, 2015
- Born: 2 October 1952; Wrocław, Poland
- Died: 20 October 2024 (aged 72); Warsaw, Poland
- Education: Higher State School of Music; Folkwangschule
- Occupations: Classical pianist; Pedagogue; Actor

Janusz Olejniczak (Polish pronunciation: [ˈjanuʂ ɔlɛjˈɲit͡ʂak]; 2 October 1952 – 20 October 2024) was a Polish classical pianist, academic teacher and actor. He made an international career as a pianist, especially with the piano music of Chopin which he played on modern and period instruments. He portrayed the composer in the 1991 film Blue Note, and played piano music in the 2002 film The Pianist, also appearing as the hand double.

== Life and career ==
Olejniczak was born in Wrocław on 2 October 1952. He began playing piano at the age of six. The family moved to Warsaw where he had piano lessons from Luiza Walewska; he was trained by Ryszard Bakst and Zbigniew Drzewiecki from 1967 to 1969. In 1970, he placed sixth in the VIII International Chopin Piano Competition in Warsaw, and two years later he placed fourth in the Alfredo Casella Piano Competition in Naples. He studied in Paris with Constantine Schmaeling and Witold Małcużyński from 1971 to 1973. He returned to Poland where he studied at the Higher State School of Music in Warsaw with Barbara Hesse-Bukowska. He completed post-graduate studies from 1977 to 1978 with Victor Merzhanov in Warsaw and with Paul Badura-Skoda at the Folkwangschule in Essen.

=== Pianist ===
Olejniczak was a member of a chamber orchestra, and his repertory included compositions of Beethoven, Schumann, Schubert, Chopin, Ravel, and Prokofiev. He played contemporary music also, such as works by Wojciech Kilar. He was the soloist in the world premiere of Giya Kancheli's Valse Boston for piano and orchestra in 1979. Olejniczak played Chopin's music on both instruments from his era and modern pianos, in juxtaposition. He performed and recorded on historic instruments such as Érard and Pleyel, with the Orchestra of the Eighteenth Century conducted by Frans Brüggen.

=== Teaching ===
Olejniczak taught classes for four years at the Academy of Music in Kraków, held master classes in Poland, Canada, the United States, and Japan. He was on the jury for international piano competitions, including the Chopin Competition, there from 2018 also for period instruments.

=== Recordings ===
Olejniczak recorded often for radio and television as well as on compact disc for labels such as Polskie Nagrania, Selene, Pony Canyon, Opus 111 and CD Accord. He recorded compositions by Rameau, Mozart, Liszt, Schubert, Prokofiev, and especially Chopin, including the latter's Piano concertos, the Fantasy on Polish Airs, the Piano Sonata in B-flat minor, the Rondo in E-flat major, and piano solo music. A reviewer from Gramophone noted that he played the 57 mazurkas on a 1849 Erard piano with a "delicate variety of colour and nuance", with a rubato that never threatened the dance rhythm.

He recorded Kilar's piano concerto and Henryk Górecki's Piano Concerto, as well as music for violin and piano with Kaja Danczowska and Chopin's Polish Songs with Stefania Toczyska. His recordings earned him seven Fryderyks, and his recordings of Chopin's piano concertos with the Sinfonia Varsovia conducted by Grzegorz Nowak were named Album of the Year be the Studio magazine in 1995.

=== Actor ===
In addition to performing the composer's music, he portrayed Chopin in the 1991 film Blue Note, directed by Andrzej Żuławski, actually resembling the composer in appearance. He performed piano music in the film The Pianist (directed by Roman Polanski), also appearing as the hand double for Adrien Brody, who portrays pianist Władysław Szpilman.

=== Personal life ===
Olejniczak died of a heart attack on 20 October 2024, at the age of 72.

== Awards ==
Olejniczak was awarded the Officer's Cross of the Order of Polonia Restituta in 2000, the Annual Reward from the Ministry of Culture in music in 2003, the Gloria Artis Medal for Merit to Culture in 2005, and the Honorary Pearl of the Polish Economy in culture in 2010.
