= Dominique Merlet =

French organist, pianist and music educator (born 1938)

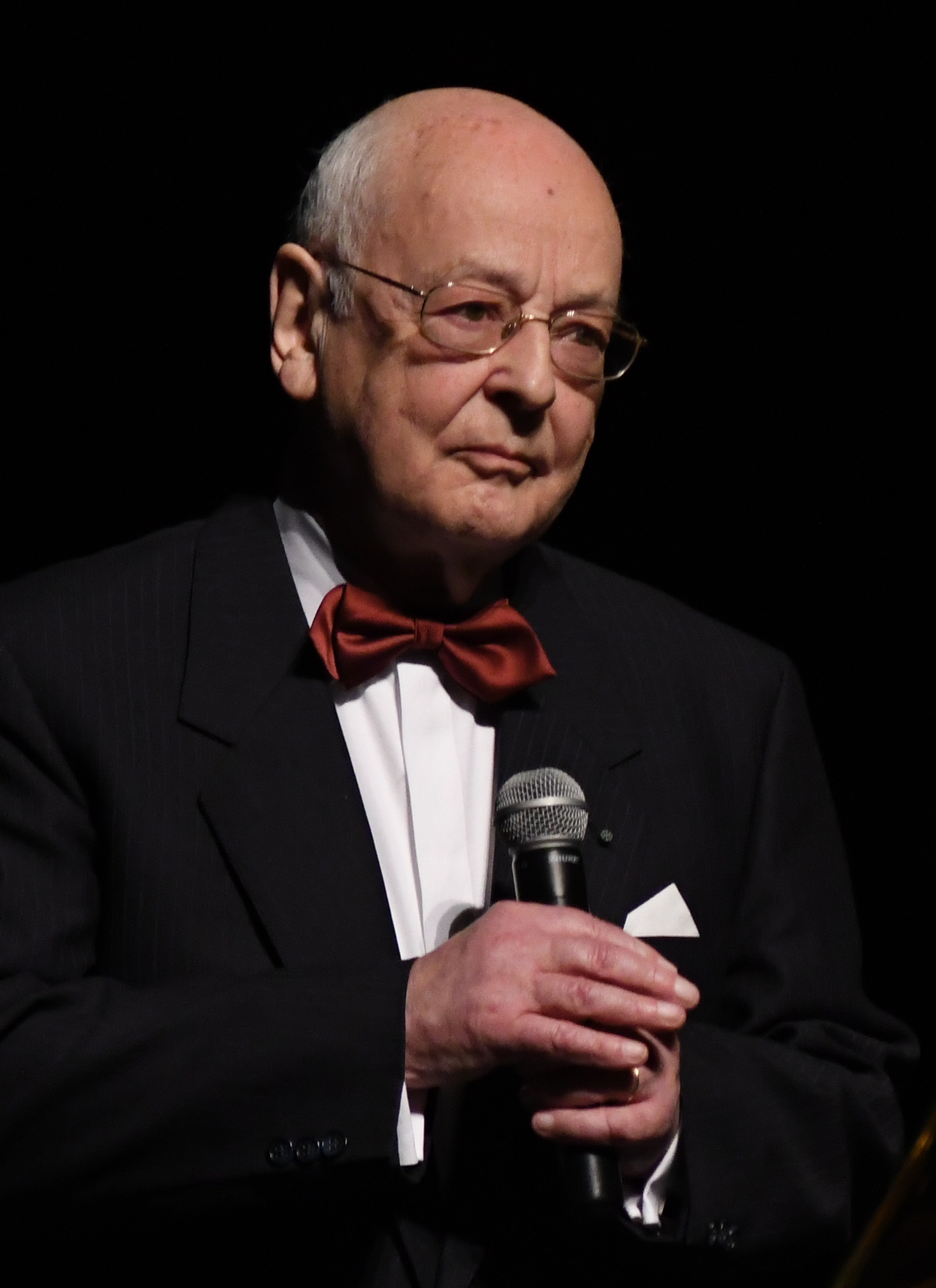
- Dominique Merlet in Valence, Drôme, 30 April 2017
- Born: 18 February 1938 (age 88); Bordeaux, France
- Education: Conservatoire de Paris
- Occupations: Classical organist; Classical pianist; Music educator
- Awards: Geneva International Music Competition

Dominique Marie-Joseph Merlet (born 18 February 1938) is a French contemporary pianist, organist and music educator.

== Biography ==
Born in Bordeaux,France. Dominique Merlet was a student of Roger-Ducasse, Louis Hiltbrand, and Nadia Boulanger. He won three first prizes at the Conservatoire de Paris before winning the premier prix, together with Martha Argerich, at the Geneva International Music Competition in 1957.

He went on to pursue a career as an international concert performer and made numerous recordings. The quality of his discography has been acclaimed several times: Prix Charles Cros, Diapason d'or, Grand Prix du disque...

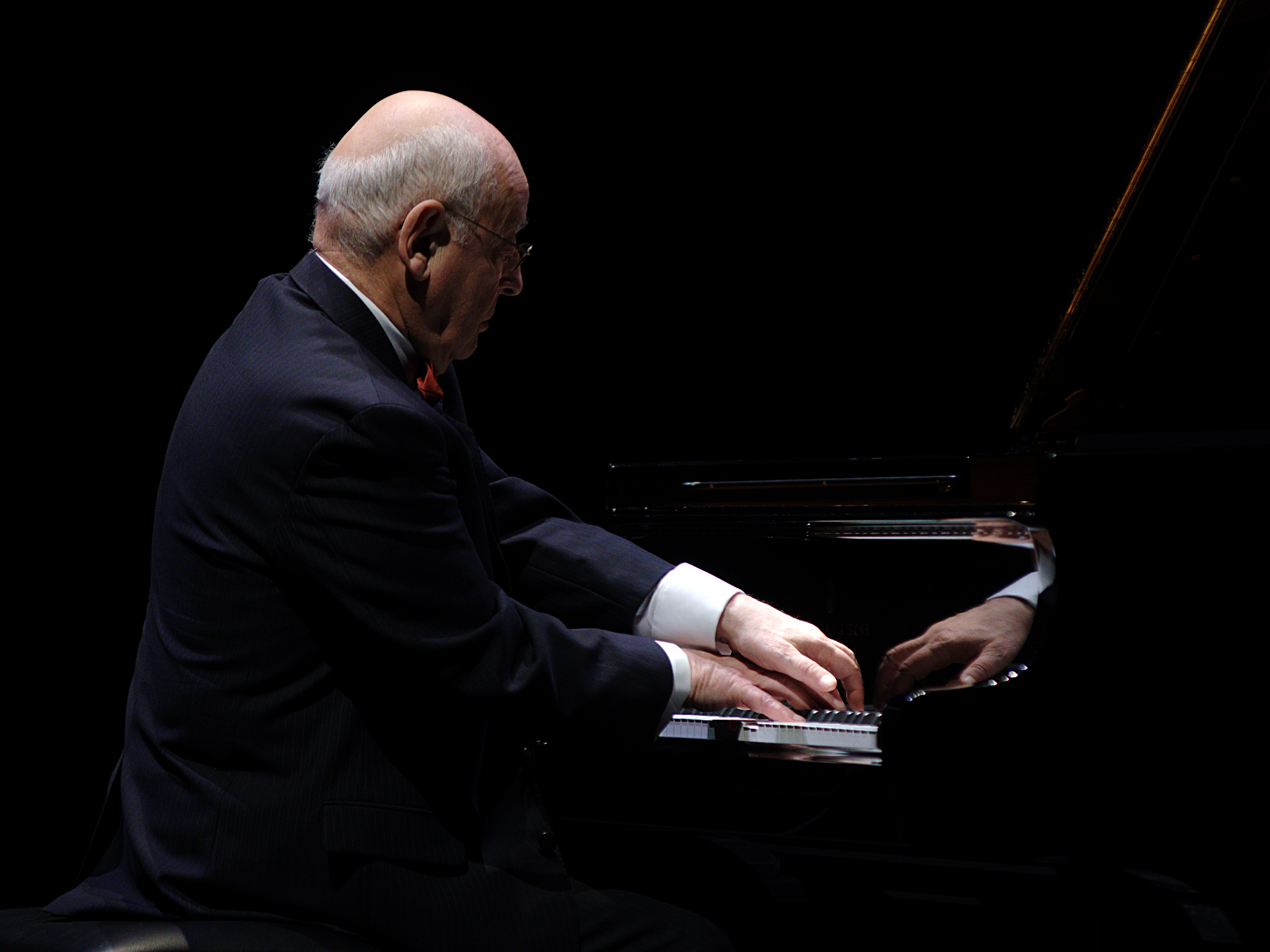
Dominique Merlet in concert at Valence, 30 April 2017.

Until 2004, he also worked as a pedagogue and adviser in Paris and Geneva for many young artists who are now pursuing an international career, including Dana Ciocarlie, Jean-Marc Luisada, Philippe Cassard, Frédéric Aguessy, Xu Zhong, François-Frédéric Guy, Kotaro Fukuma, Ha-Young Sul. Between 1956 and 1990, he was titular organist at Notre-Dame-des-Blancs-Manteaux in Paris.

Former president of EPTA, the European Association of Piano Teachers, Dominique Merlet is a regular member of the juries of the most prestigious international piano competitions. (see below)

== Discography ==
Soloist

- Bartók, Danses roumaines, Élégie, Burlesque, Suite Op. 14, Sonata for piano (6-9 August 1979, FY/Disques du Solstice) OCLC 425304411
- Brahms, Ballades Op. 10; Klavierstücke Op. 76; Fantaisies Op. 116 (2005, Mandala) OCLC 743065208
- Chopin, works for piano (2010, Bayard Musique)
- Debussy, Pour le piano, Masques, Images (January 1993, Mandala MAN 4826) OCLC 590005764
- Fauré Pieces for piano (July 1998, Mandala MAN 4933) OCLC 659095546
- Fauré and Roger-Ducasse, works for piano (2010, Bayard Musique)
- Kirchner, works for piano: Präludien, Op. 9; Skizzen, Op. 11; Aquarellen, Op. 21; Confidences, Op. 96; Nachtbilder, Op. 25 (2002, Mandala) OCLC 319836987
- Leguay, Azur, for piano (7-8 June 2012, Neos) OCLC 897846237
- Liszt, Bénédiction de Dieu dans la solitude; Sonnet de Pétrarque n°104 (April 1986, Quantum QM6891 / Bayard Musique) OCLC 658866021
- Liszt, works for piano (2010, Bayard Musique)
- Ravel, integral piano works (1990/1991, 2CD Mandala MAN 4807/08 / Bayard Musique) OCLC 659094396
- Roger-Ducasse, works for piano (2001, Mandala MAN 5011) OCLC 659094228
- Satie, The Piano Work for Four Hands - with Jean-Pierre Armengaud (1993, Mandala / Bayard Musique S408805) OCLC 31822475, 494707271
- Schumann, Études symphoniques Op. 13; Arabesque Op. 18; Davidsbündlertänze Op. 6° (1966°/1968, Accord 202612) OCLC 658496164
- Schumann, Allegro in b minor Op. 8; Sonata Op. 22; Trois romances Op. 28; Albumblätter Op. 124 (1966/1968, Accord) OCLC 38472388
- L'Âge d'or du piano: Mozart (Fantasy KV. 397), Beethoven (Piano Sonata No. 31 Op. 110), Liszt (Sonnet de Pétrarque n° 123), Schumann (L'oiseau-prophète) (7-8 April 2009, Bayard Musique S 424586) OCLC 762434270

Chambrist

- Beethoven, Sonatas for piano and violin - Gérard Poulet, violin (1999/2000, 4CD Mandala MAN 4954/57) OCLC 659096822
- Weber, Grand duo concertant, Op. 48; Trio for flute, cello and piano, Op. 63; Sonata for piano n°2, Op. 39 - Guy Deplus (clarinet), Martine Joste, Maxence Larrieu (flute), Michel Renard (cello) (1967–69, Accord Musidisc) OCLC 35717299

== See also ==
- III Sendai International Music Competition
- XIII International Chopin Piano Competition
- List of jurors of the International Chopin Piano Competition
