= Elżbieta Stefańska =

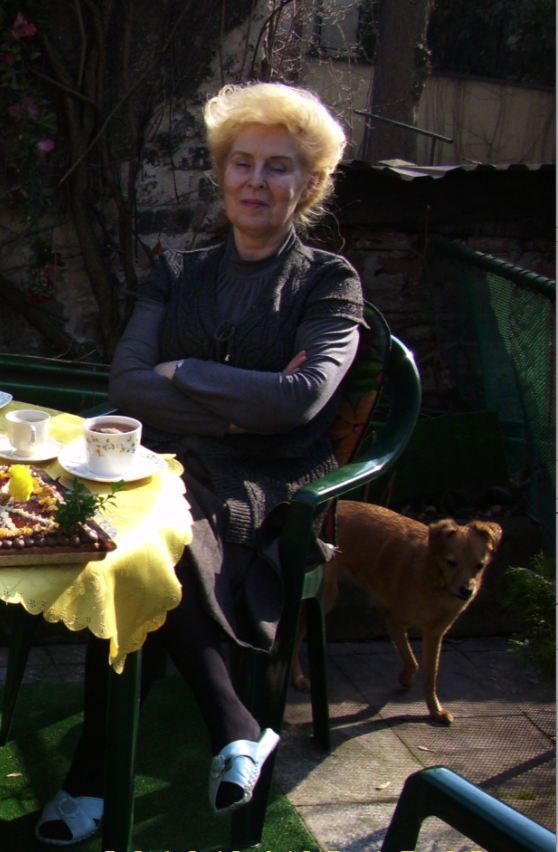

Background information
- Born: September 7, 1943 (age 82); Kraków, Occupied Poland
- Instrument: Harpsichord

Elżbieta Stefańska-Kłyś (born 7 September 1943, Kraków) is a Polish harpsichordist player and professor.

== Biography ==
She is the daughter of pianists Halina Czerny-Stefańska and Ludwik Stefański. In her youth, she studied harpsichord under the supervision of Janina Wysocka-Ochlewska, and then completed her studies at the Academy of Music in Kraków and in the classes of Hans Pischner from Berlin. She perfected her skills at master classes in Siena and Weimar.

In 1982 she obtained the title of professor. From 1981 to 1990 she was the head of the Department of Harpsichord and Period Instruments at the Academy of Music in Krakow. She also conducts master classes.

== Awards ==
She has been awarded with the Officer's Cross of the Order of Polonia Restituta (2001) and the Silver (2008) and Gold (2018) Gloria Artis Medal for Merit to Culture.
