= Dean Kramer =

American pianist (born 1952)

Dean Kramer (born April 29, 1952, Philadelphia) is an American pianist and a professor emeritus of piano at the University of Oregon.

Kramer studied music at the Oberlin Conservatory of Music (student of Joseph Schwartz) and the University of Texas (student of John Perry), and also performed in masterclasses in France for Leon Fleisher. He also studied with Gina Bachauer and performed for Arthur Rubinstein in Alice Tully Hall, New York. Kramer was one of the few pianists to have studied with Vladimir Horowitz. In 1972, Kramer was awarded first place at the Washington International Piano Competition, D.C. Three years later, in 1975, he won the first national Chopin competition in Miami, and then won fifth place in the IX International Chopin Piano Competition in Warsaw.
