= Bella Davidovich =

Soviet-American pianist (born 1928)

- Белла Давидович
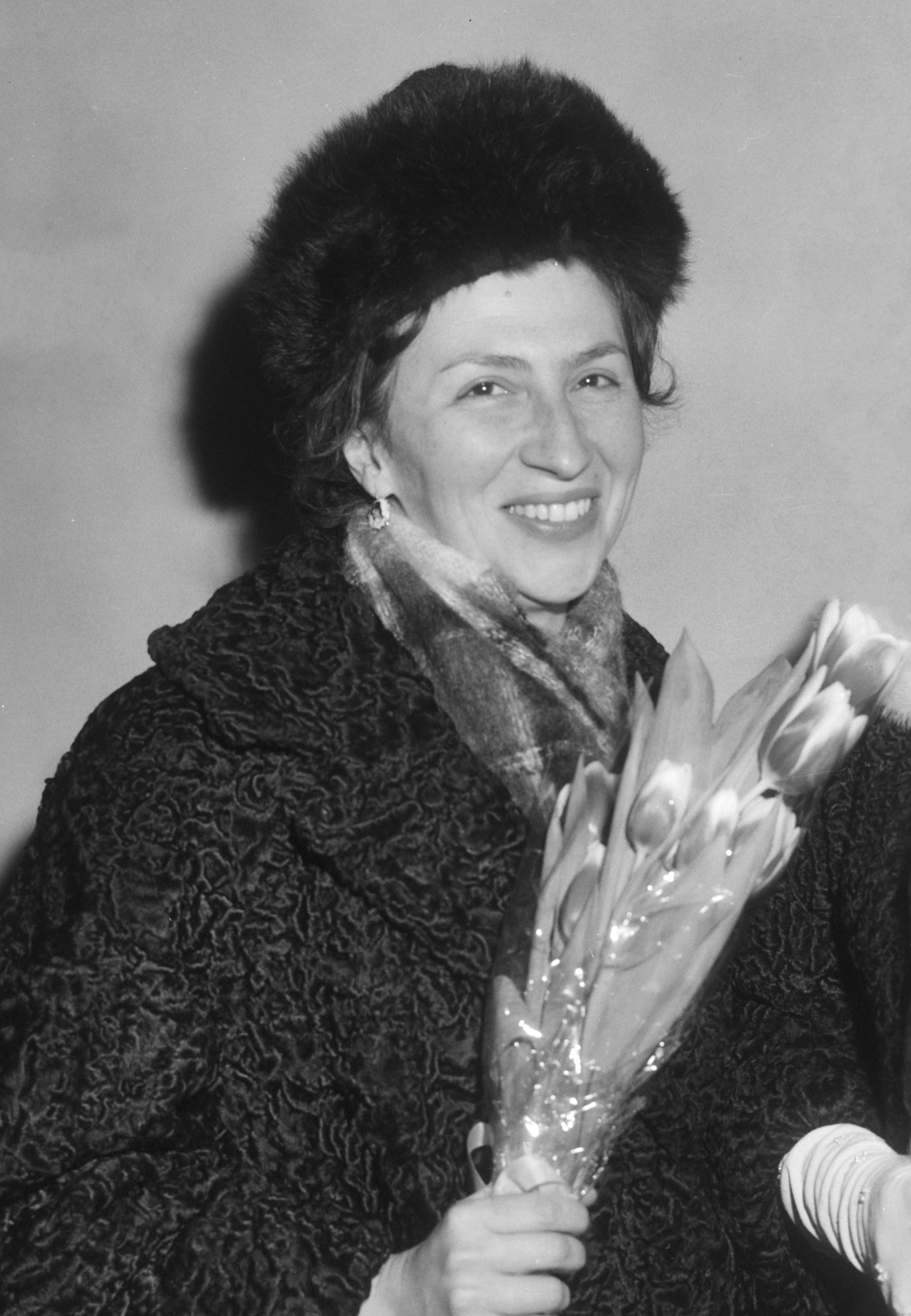
- Born: July 16, 1928 (age 97); Baku, Azerbaijan SSR (later Azerbaijan)
- Citizenship: American
- Occupation: Pianist
- Years active: since 1939

Bella Mikhaylovna Davidovich (Russian: Белла Миха́йловна Давидо́вич; born July 16, 1928) is a Soviet-American pianist.

== Biography ==
Davidovich was born in Baku, Azerbaijan SSR, into a Jewish family of musicians and began studying piano when she was six. Three years later, she was the soloist for a performance of Beethoven's Piano Concerto No. 1. In 1939, she moved to Moscow to continue her musical education. At the age of 18, she entered the Moscow Conservatory, where she studied with Konstantin Igumnov and Yakov Flier. In 1949, she shared the first prize with Halina Czerny-Stefańska at the IV International Chopin Piano Competition. This launched her on a career in the Soviet Union and Eastern Europe, in which she appeared with every major Russian conductor and performed as a soloist with the Leningrad Philharmonic Orchestra for 28 consecutive seasons. She also taught at the Moscow Conservatory for sixteen years, and taught at the Juilliard School. She was married to violinist Julian Sitkovetsky. Their son, Dmitry Sitkovetsky, is a violinist and conductor.

In 1978 she emigrated to the United States, where she became a naturalized citizen. She has taught at the Juilliard School in New York City since 1982. With the spirit of perestroika, she became the first Soviet émigré musician to receive an official invitation from the Soviet agency Goskoncert to perform in her native country. She played concertos, a recital with her son Dmitry Sitkovetsky playing the violin, and chamber music with the Borodin String Quartet to sold-out halls.
