= Dina Joffe =

Latvian musician

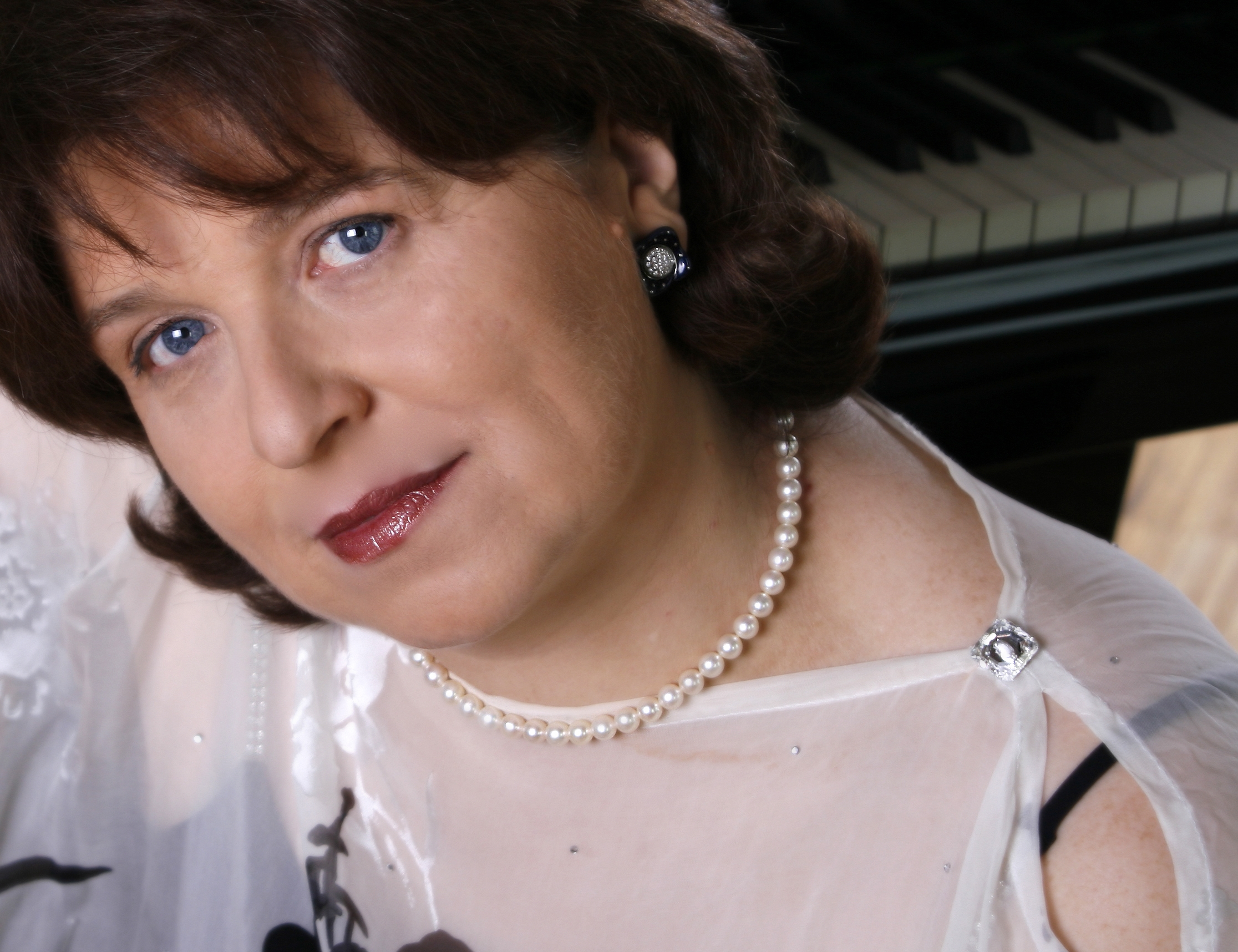
Dina Yoffe in 2007

Dina Yoffe (also Dina Jofe and Dina Joffe, born in Riga, Latvia on 18 December 1952) is a Latvian pianist, pedagogue and winner of many musical competitions.

== Biography ==
Dina Yoffe was born in Riga, Soviet-occupied Latvia, in 1952. She received her first musical award – Concertino Prague – in 1967, when she was only 15 years old. She was awarded the IX Fryderyk Chopin and the VI Robert Schumann competitions' 2nd prizes before graduating from the Moscow Conservatory in 1976. She remains internationally active as a pedagogue and a concert pianist.

Originally from Riga (Latvia), Yoffe started her musical education at Emīls Dārziņš Special School of Music in her home city and continued at the Central Music School in Moscow as the most talented pupil from Latvia. Graduated from the Tchaikovsky Conservatory of Music in Moscow under the tutelage of Professor Vera Gornostayeva, one of the most important proponents of the legendary Heinrich Neuhaus school.

Among the high points of her international career are concerts with outstanding orchestras, such as the Israel Philharmonic under Zubin Mehta, NHK under Neville Marriner, the Moscow Philharmonic under Valery Gergiev and Dmitri Kitayenko, Tokyo Metropolitan Orchestra under James De Priest, Orchestra "Kremerata Baltica" under Gidon Kremer, "Moscow Soloist" under Yuri Bashmet, Orchestra Sinfonia Varsovia under Jerzy Kaspszyk.

She has also given recitals at events, such as the Chopin and his Europe Festival in Warsaw, Chopin Festival in Duszniki, Music Festival in Bayreuth, Germany, Elba Music Festival (Italy) and Summit Music Festival (USA), as well as concerts in the Barbican Centre in London, Suntory Hall in Tokyo, "Serate Musicale" Sala Verdi in Milano, Musikverein und Konzerthaus in Vienna and Great Hall of Moscow Conservatory, Salle Pleyel in Paris. In 2013 she also has given a concert with the Orchestra of the Eighteenth Century, conducted by Frans Brüggen, at the Royal Palace in the Hague for her Majesty Queen Beatrix.

Together with the wide solo and orchestral career, Yoffe is also an active participant in Chamber Music Festivals, where she has played with many internationally renowned musicians, such as G. Kremer, Y. Bashmet, V. Tretiakov, V. Repin, M. Vaiman and M. Brunello. Yoffe has given piano recitals of all Chopin's works in Tokyo, Osaka and Yokohama. The concert series was filmed and broadcast by Japanese National Television NHK.

She has given numerous Master Classes in France, Germany, Spain, at the Royal Academy of Music in London and Mozarteum Summer Academy in Salzburg, and is the guest Professor at the Yamaha Master Classes in Paris, New York, Hamburg and Tokyo. 1989-1996 Professor at the Rubin Academy of Music in Tel-Aviv University (Israel). 1995-2000 Visiting Professor at Aichi University of Arts, Japan. Jury member of international piano competitions-Cleveland (USA), Hamamatsu (Japan), Chopin (Warsaw), Maria Canals (Barcelona), Liszt Competition (Weimar) among others.

Yoffe has numerous Radio, TV and commercial recordings. Among her record releases are Chopin's 24 Preludes (VD-VDC-1334), The Fantasy in f-minor and 19 Waltzes (CD-VICC-63), Schumann - Symphony Etudes opus. 13 and Kreisleriana Opus 16 (AGPL-003). CD's "Real Chopin" NIFC 012, on Pleyel (Paris, 1848). CD "Real Chopin" for two pianos and four hands with Daniel Vaiman, NIFC 024, CD with Schumann Sonata in f sharp minor, op.11, Chopin Four Scherzo's (PAMP-1036/2009), Chopin Sonata in b minor, op.58, Four Impromptus (PAMP-1040/2010) DVD live recordings with works of A. Scriabin, S. Rachmaninoff, as well as works by Chopin, Schubert, Schumann, S. Prokofiev, etc. Chamber music of Schubert (XCP-5026), Franck, Schumann, S. Prokofiev (AGPL-001)
