= Akiko Ebi =

Japanese-French pianist

Akiko Ebi 海老 彰子
- Born: July 7, 1953 (age 73); Osaka
- Genre: classical music
- Occupation: pianist

Akiko Ebi (海老 彰子, Ebi Akiko; born July 7, 1953) is a Japanese-French pianist.

Ebi was born in Osaka. She studied at the Tokyo University of the Arts, and won the piano prize of the 41st Music Competition of Japan. Her international career began with her winning second prize in the 1975 Marguerite Long-Jacques Thibaud Competition in Paris. She continued her studies with Aldo Ciccolini at the Conservatoire de Paris. In 1980, she won fifth prize at the X International Chopin Piano Competition, after which Martha Argerich, who was a member of the jury, took patronage over her.

== Recordings ==
Ebi has recorded works by Chopin, Brahms, Liszt, Franck and others. Among her most noteworthy recordings are the two discs "Music of Hikari Ōe" of works by the Japanese composer Hikari Ōe.

== Awards ==
- 1975 – second prize in the 16th Long-Thibaud Competition
- 1980 – fifth prize (no fourth was awarded) in the 10th International Chopin Piano Competition
- 1981 – Leeds International Piano Competition
- 1993 – French government Chevalier des Arts et des Lettres, distinction
- 2002 – Japanese Exxon-Mobile Music Prize
