= Eugen Indjic =

French-American pianist (1947–2024)

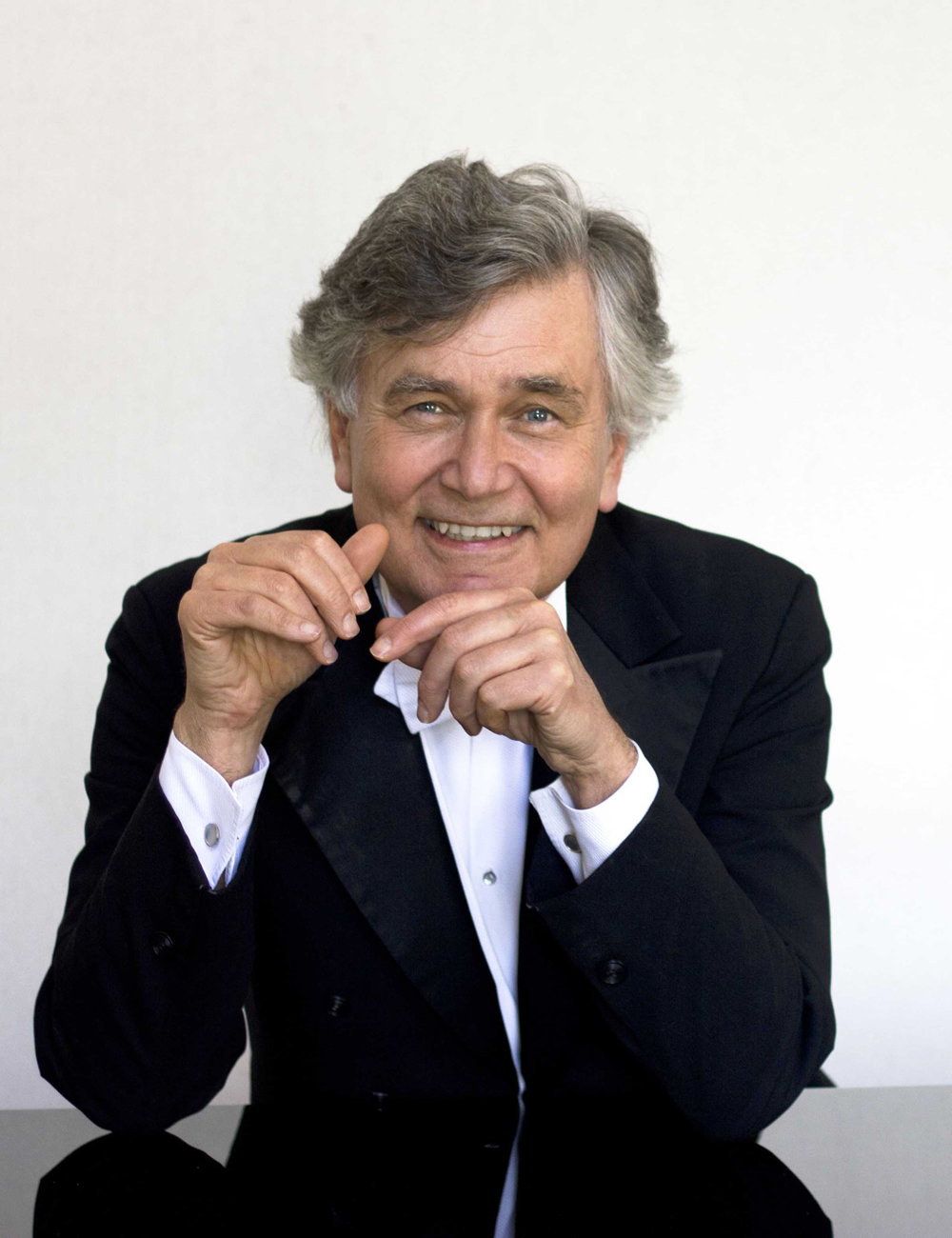
Indjic in 2014

Eugen Indjic (March 11, 1947 – February 28, 2024) was a Yugoslav-born French-American pianist.

== Biography ==
Eugen Indjic was born in Belgrade on March 11, 1947. His father was a Serb Yugoslav army general serving under King Peter II of Yugoslavia. Emigrating to the United States with his Russian mother, an amateur pianist, at the age of four, he there became fascinated by the piano four years later after hearing a recording of Chopin’s Fantaisie-Impromptu and Polonaise in A flat major. Moved by a desire to master these pieces, he took systematic piano lessons with Georgian pianist, Liubov Stephani.

Indjic made his first public performance at the age of nine, appearing with the Springfield, Mass. Youth Orchestra in Mozart’s D-minor Piano Concerto. After two years, Mrs. Stephani introduced her young pupil to Alexander Borovsky, the eminent Russian pianist, pupil of Anna Yesipova and classmate of Serge Prokofiev, who taught him in Boston University for the next five years (1959–1964).

At the age of 11, he was already playing Liszt's Campanella and Hungarian Rhapsody No. 13 on NBC television and at 12, made his first recording for RCA Victor on Rachmaninov's own piano, playing Beethoven's Diabelli Variations. At 13, he performed Liszt’s Piano Concerto in E flat major and a year later the Brahms' Piano Concerto n°2 with the Washington National Symphony Orchestra.

Between 1961 and 1969, invited by Arthur Fiedler, Eugen Indjic appeared numerous times each season with the Boston Pops Orchestra. His first concert tour (consisting of 13 concerts) was in Denmark (1963), together with Alexander Borovsky. "He plays Chopin as a Pole, Debussy as a Frenchman and Prokofiev as a Russian master" wrote the Politiken of Copenhagen.

After his graduation in 1965 from Phillips Academy Andover, Erich Leinsdorf invited him to play Brahms’ Piano Concerto No. 2 with the Boston Symphony, making him the youngest soloist ever to appear with that orchestra.

"Leonard-Bernstein Scholar" at Harvard University, he studied musicology and composition with Laurence D. Berman and Leon Kirchner, graduating "cum laude" in 1969. Leonard Bernstein qualified him as "an extraordinary pianist and musician" and Emil Gilels called him "a unique and inspired artist". While in Harvard, he also took private lessons at the Juilliard School with Mieczysław Munz and Rosina Lhévinne’s apprentice Lee Thompson.

In 1968, he met Arthur Rubinstein, who remained a friend and mentor until his death, calling Indjic "a world-class pianist of rare musical and artistic perfection".

Indjic studied composition with Nadia Boulanger in Paris and then definitely settled in France in 1972 after marrying Odile Rabaud, granddaughter of the French composer Henri Rabaud, who succeeded Fauré as director of the Paris Conservatory, and coincidentally in 1919 the first French conductor of the Boston Symphony.

Prize-winner of three international contests - Warsaw (1970), Leeds (1972), and Rubinstein Tel Aviv (1974) - Indjic has performed with the leading orchestras of the United States, Europe and Asia, and under such conductors as Leonard Bernstein, Vladimir Fedoseyev, Valery Gergiev, Eugen Jochum, Rafael Kubelik, Erich Leinsdorf, Kurt Sanderling, Giuseppe Sinopoli, Georg Solti, Edo de Waart and David Zinman, among others. He continues to play regularly on great world stages such as Carnegie Hall Isaac Stern Auditorium, Avery Fisher Hall, Queen Elizabeth Hall, the Concertgebouw Grote Zaal, the Musikverein, Salle Pleyel and Théâtre des Champs-Elysées, Bolshoi Hall, La Scala.

Eugen Indjic was invited to participate in a televised co-production (France, Poland, Japan) of Chopin’s complete works and has recorded for Polskie Nagrania / Muza, Columbia Records, RCA Victor, Claves and Calliope.

His discography includes works by Chopin (Piano Concertos, complete Ballades, Scherzi, Impromptus, Sonatas and Mazurkas) Debussy, Schumann, Prokofiev, Stravinsky as well as Beethoven.

Arte Nova Classics has released live performances with the SWF Orchestra of Tchaikovsky’s Concerto in B-flat minor with Ahronovich and Rachmaninoff’s Paganini Variations with Sinopoli. His recording of Chopin’s Mazurkas was doubly acclaimed because of the Joyce Hatto hoax. The English pianist signed her name to this disc and received rave reviews.

In addition to performing, Indjic regularly taught master classes in Europe, Japan and the United States, and was a frequent jury member of international competitions including the Chopin, Liszt Wroclaw, Rubinstein Tel Aviv, Prague Spring Festival, Lisbon Vianna Da Motta.

His teaching activities also included the Schola Cantorum in Paris, the International University of Valencia (VIU), Spain and the Art Institute of Forth Worth.

In 2010, he was named "artist-in-residence" at the Prague Symphony Orchestra.

Indjic died on February 28, 2024, at the age of 76.

== Sources ==
- Pâris, Alain. Dictionnaire Des Interprètes Et De L'Interprétation Musicale Depuis 1900, Robert Laffont, 2004.
- Dybowski, Stanisław. The Laureates of the Chopin competitions in Warsaw, Selene, 2010.
