= Lidia Grychtołówna =

Polish pianist (1928–2026)

- Grychtołówna, in c. 1948
- Born: 18 July 1928; Rybnik, Poland
- Died: 18 November 2026 (aged 98)
- Occupation: Classical pianist

Lidia Grychtołówna (18 July 1928 – 18 November 2026) was a Polish pianist who made an international career.

== Life and career ==
Grychtołówna was born in Rybnik on 18 July 1928. She began to learn music at age three and gave her first concert in her hometown at age five. She had piano lessons from 1935, first with Wanda Chmielowska, then at the Silesian Conservatory in Katowice. During World War II she studied with Karol Szafranek. She studied at the State Music Academy in Katowice, again with Chmielowska, from 1945 to 1951, achieving a diploma with highest honours. She studied further with Zbigniew Drzewiecki in Kraków and Warsaw until 1955. She took master classes with Arturo Benedetti Michelangeli in 1957 and 1958.

In 1955 she was awarded the V International Chopin Piano Competition's seventh prize, and one year later she shared the third prize of the inaugural edition of the Robert Schumann Competition with Mikhail Voskresensky. She subsequently performed throughout the world, and was professor at the University of Mainz from 1986. She served as a juror at the Chopin Competition in five editions between 1980 and 2000.

She was decorated with the Gold Medal of the City of Milan.

Grychtołówna died on 18 November 2026, at the age of 98.
