= Ivan Klánský =

Czech pianist

Ivan Klánský (born 1948) is a Czech pianist.

He studied at Academy of Performing Arts in Prague with František Rauch (1968-1973) and at the Prague Conservatory with Valentina Kameníková (1963-1968).

He is laureate of some of the most prestigious international competitions (Bolzano 1967, Naples 1968, Bach Competition Leipzig 1968, Warsaw 1970, Barcelona 1970, Fort Worth, Texas 1973, Paloma O'Shea Santander International Piano Competition 1976), to which he later returned as a jury member in 1998. He has performed as a soloist and chamber musician internationally since. In addition, he has recorded for Naxos Records, Supraphon and Praga Digitals (Harmonia Mundi) and Editio Onta.

Klánský held a professorship at the Musikhochschule Luzern (1991-2011) and is professor and head of the keyboard instrument department at the Academy of Performing Arts in Prague where he is also sub-dean. Ivan Klánský was chairman of the Czech Chopin Society from 1995 to 1998 and is honorary president of the Chopin Festival in Marienbad as well as chairman of the Frederyk Chopin International Piano Competition.

In 1986 he founded with Čeněk Pavlík and Marek Jerie the Guarneri Trio Prague - a trio that to this day still performs in his original line-up.

== Records ==
(non exhaustive list):

- Klánský plays Chopin (2016)
- Masterpieces For Piano Left Hand (2015)
- Martinů: Piano Quintets H. 229, 298 and Piano Quartet H. 287 (2009)
- Smetana: Complete Works for Piano, Vol. 4 (2005)
- Johannes Brahms: Cello Sontatas Nos. 1 and 2, Scherzo (2005)
- Ernest Bloch: The Two Piano Quintets (2003)
- Leoš Janáček: Works for pianoa Solo (2010)
- Schubert: Impromptus
