= Piotr Maszyński =

Polish composer (1855 - 1934)

Piotr Maszyński (1855–1934) was a Polish composer. He is particularly noted as a composer of art songs in Polish songs, and to a large number of carols published 1888–1905 in separate volumes of Lutnia magazine. He is buried in Powązki Cemetery, Warsaw.

== Recordings ==
Maszyński: Songs Lilianna Zalesińska (mezzo-soprano), Jolanta Pszczółkowska-Pawlik (piano) 2022 DUX1841
