= Arthur Hedley =

British musicologist

- Born: 12 November 1905
- Died: 8 November 1969 (aged 63); Birmingham, England
- Education: Durham, the Sorbonne
- Occupations: musicologist, scholar and biographer
- Notable work: biography of Polish composer Frédéric Chopin
- Awards: Commander's Cross of the Order of Polonia Restituta

Arthur Hedley (12 November 1905 – 8 November 1969) was a British musicologist, scholar and biographer of Polish composer Frédéric Chopin.

Arthur Hedley was educated at Durham and at the Sorbonne, and he devoted much of his life to the study of the composer Frédéric Chopin and his music. 1947 saw the publication of Hedley's biography of Chopin, as part of The Master Musicians series. Having lived in Poland for several years, Hedley learned Polish and was able to translate and edit many of Chopin's letters, which had been collected and annotated by Bronisław Edward Sydow, and which were published in 1962 as Selected Correspondence of Fryderyk Chopin.

Hedley was vice-president of the International Chopin Competition in 1949, the centenary of Chopin's death, and received the Commander's Cross of the Order of Polonia Restituta. He processed a considerable collection of Chopiniana, and died at Birmingham on 8 November 1969, aged 63, and is buried in Lodge Hill Cemetery.
