= Halina Czerny-Stefańska =

Polish pianist (1922–2001)

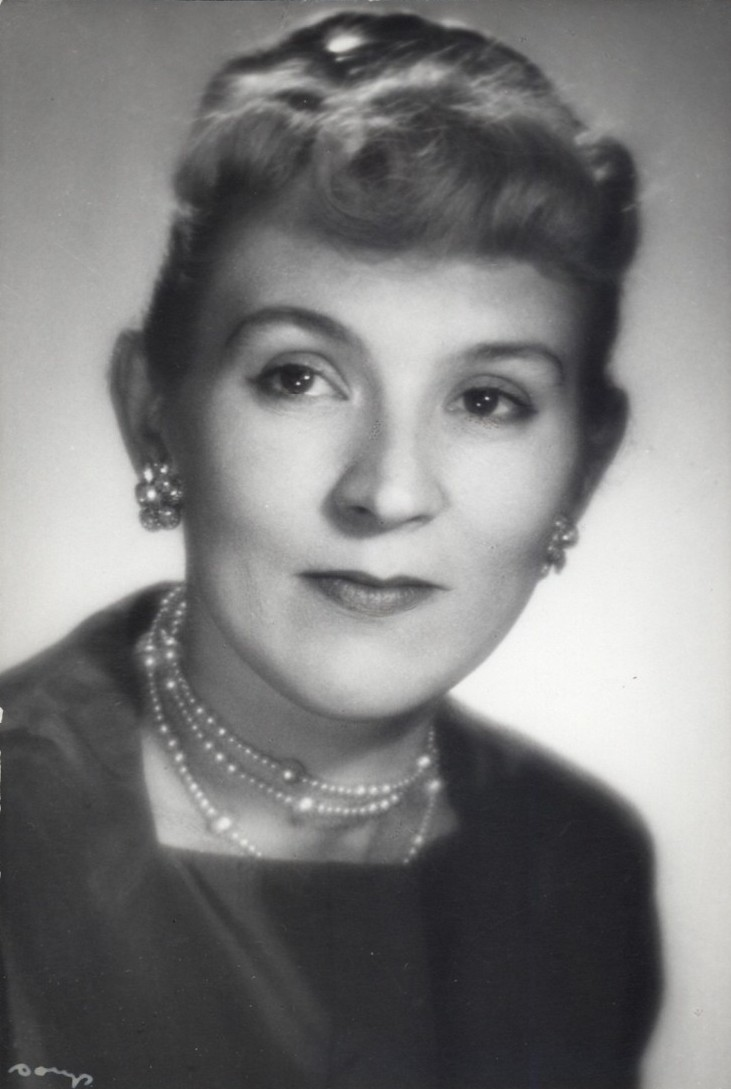
- Czerny-Stefańska in 1959
- Born: Halina Szwarcenberg-Czerny; 31 December 1922; Kraków, Poland
- Died: 1 July 2001 (aged 78); Kraków, Poland
- Occupation: Classical pianist

Halina Czerny-Stefańska ([ˈxaˈlina t͡ʂɛrnɨ stɛˈfaj᷉ska]; 31 December 1922 – 1 July 2001) was a Polish classical pianist.

== Life ==
She studied piano under her father, Stanisław Szwarcenberg-Czerny, as well as with Alfred Cortot at the École Normale de Musique in Paris, and later with Józef Turczyński and Zbigniew Drzewiecki in Warsaw. She was a joint First Prize winner at the IV International Chopin Piano Competition in Warsaw in 1949, sharing this prize with Bella Davidovich. Her repertoire was restricted to few composers other than Frédéric Chopin and even her Chopin repertoire was not large. For example, she did not play the Piano Concerto No. 1 in E minor live until 1951, and she never played the F minor concerto at all, as she did not like it.

She was proven to be the real pianist in a recording of the E minor concerto that was misattributed to Dinu Lipatti. The recording was released in 1966 by EMI, and on the 1971 British release was a note to the effect that, although the name of the conductor and orchestra were not known, there was no doubt the soloist was Lipatti. The BBC broadcast the recording in 1981, and a listener wrote in, noting the similarities between it and a Supraphon recording of 1957 with Czerny-Stefańska under conductor Václav Smetáček. Tests revealed these were one and the same recording. The so-called Lipatti recording was withdrawn.

Halina Czerny-Stefańska was a juror in many piano competitions including the Leeds International Pianoforte Competition, the International Tchaikovsky Competition, and the Marguerite Long-Jacques Thibaud Competition. She was also a juror at the International Chopin Piano Competition for many years.

Halina Czerny-Stefańska died in Kraków on 1 July 2001.

=== Socio-political activities ===
Czerny-Stefańska participated in the socio-political life of Krakow. From 1976 to 1984, she served as a Krakow City Councilor, and from 1978 to 1985, she was a member of the Social Committee for the Restoration of Krakow Monuments. She was one of the founders of the Kuźnica association (alongside artists such as Andrzej Wajda). From 1981 to 1983, she was a member of the Presidium of the National Committee of the Front of National Unity.

She belonged to a small group of artists who expressed support for the political authorities during martial law, for which she was applauded at a concert at the Krakow Philharmonic in April 1982. Member of the National Council of the Patriotic Movement for National Rebirth (PRON) in 1983.

== Personal life ==
Her daughter, with husband Ludwik Stefański (1917–1982) is Elżbieta Stefańska-Łukowicz (b. 1943), is a harpsichordist and professor at the Academy of Music in Kraków, Poland.

== Selected recordings ==
Halina Czerny-Stefańska's discography includes recordings done by the labels: Deutsche Grammophon, Decca, His Master's Voice, Polskie Nagrania "Muza", Supraphon, RCA-Japan, and Telefunken.

She has recorded works by Mozart, Beethoven, Chopin (a large selection), Paderewski, Grieg, Szymanowski, and Zarębski.

- Wolfgang Amadeus Mozart, Piano Concerto No. 23 in A major, K. 488. Česká filharmonie (Czech Philharmonic), Karel Ančerl, Conductor. Supraphon (1952).
- Frédéric Chopin, Piano Concerto in E minor Op. 11, Supraphon SUA 10130 (1955).
- Frédéric Chopin, 24 preludes, Op. 28, Polskie Nagrania Muza SX 0062 (1960).
- Frédéric Chopin, Complete set of the Polonaises, Polskie Nagrania Muza (1960).
- Ludwig van Beethoven, Piano Concerto No. 2 in B-flat major, Op. 19; Edvard Grieg, Piano Concerto in A minor, Op. 16. Polish Radio Symphony Orchestra, Jan Krenz, Conductor. Polskie Nagrania Muza SX 0107 (1979).
- Frédéric Chopin, Complete set of the Nocturnes, Japanese RCA (1985–1987).
- Frédéric Chopin, Complete set of the Mazurkas, Canyon Classics (1989–1990).
