= Bolesław Woytowicz =

Polish pianist and composer (1899–1980)

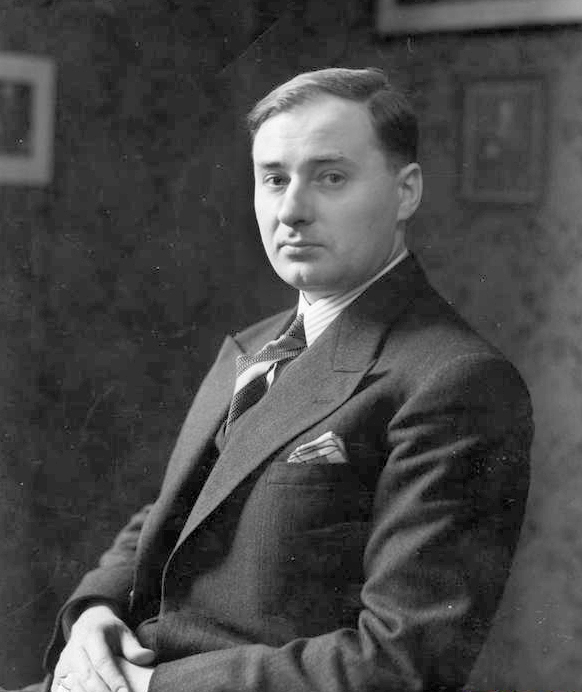
Bolesław Woytowicz in 1937

Bolesław Woytowicz (5 December 1899 – 11 June 1980) was a Polish pianist and composer.

Woytowicz was born in Dunaivtsi. In 1924 he was appointed a piano and music theory teacher in the Warsaw Conservatory, where he had been trained under Aleksander Michałowski and Witold Maliszewski. He won an honorable mention at the inaugural I International Chopin Piano Competition. For the next 15 years he combined his pedagogical labour with a concert career through Europe and the United States and further composition studies under Nadia Boulanger. Once Poland was freed from German occupation Woytowicz resumed his teaching in the Higher State School of Music in Katowice, where he retired in 1975 and died at the age of 80.

A versatile pianist, Woytowicz was renowned for his intellectual approach to piano playing. His compositive corpus comprises three Symphonies:

- 1st Symphony - 20 Variations in symphonic form (1938)
- 2nd Symphony "Warszawska" (1945)
- 3rd Symphony - Sinfonia concertante for piano and orchestra (1963)

...as well as several symphonic-choral and symphonic-vocal works. In the postwar period, Woytowicz alternately worked on large scale works and chamber music such as his 2nd string quartet and his Flute sonata. In the 60s, starting with his first series of piano etudes and the 3rd Symphony, piano regained a prominent role in his music.

== Biography ==
- Bolesław Woytowicz biography
