= Jan Ekier =

Polish pianist and composer

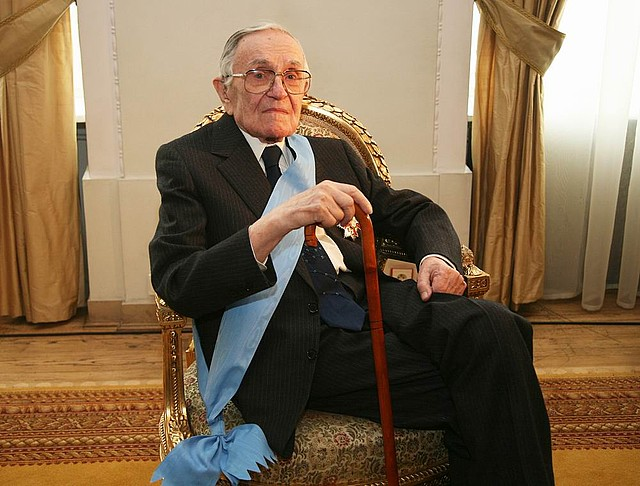
Jan Ekier after having received the Order of the White Eagle (2010)

Jan Stanisław Ekier (29 August 1913 – 15 August 2014) was a Polish pianist and composer known for his authoritative edition of Chopin's music for the Chopin National Edition.

== Biography ==
Ekier was born in Kraków, Poland. As a youth, he studied piano with Olga Stolfowa, and later composition with Bernardino Rizzi at the Władysław Żeleński School of Music. He continued formal music studies at the Warsaw Conservatory, where his teachers included Zbigniew Drzewiecki (piano) and Kazimierz Sikorski (composition). He was awarded the III International Chopin Piano Competition's 8th prize in 1937. He was later an organ student with Bronisław Rutkowski.

In 1959, he started the project of a new critical edition of Chopin's works that later became the Chopin National Edition. From 1967 to 2010, the entirety of Chopin's known works were published in 37 volumes, accompanied by source and performance commentaries. In 2004, he received a special award from the Minister of Culture of Poland, "in recognition of his outstanding contribution to the preservation and popularization of the legacy of Fryderyk Chopin, in particular for the monumental edition of the National Edition of the Works of Fryderyk Chopin, restoring to European culture the art of the great Polish composer in a form closest to its historical original."

On 17 April 2000, Ekier was awarded the Commander's Cross with Star of the Order of Polonia Restituta. On 21 October 2010, he received the Order of the White Eagle.

He was the Chair of the Jury for the XIII International Chopin Piano Competition when Alexei Sultanov was not awarded the First Prize.

His first wife was the Polish actress Danuta Szaflarska. Ekier died in Warsaw, two weeks short of his 101st birthday.

Among his students are Marta Karbownicka, Bronisława Kawalla, Piotr Paleczny, Alicja Paleta-Bugaj and Yuko Kawai.

== See also ==
- List of centenarians (musicians, composers and music patrons)
