= František Rauch =

Czech pianist and music teacher

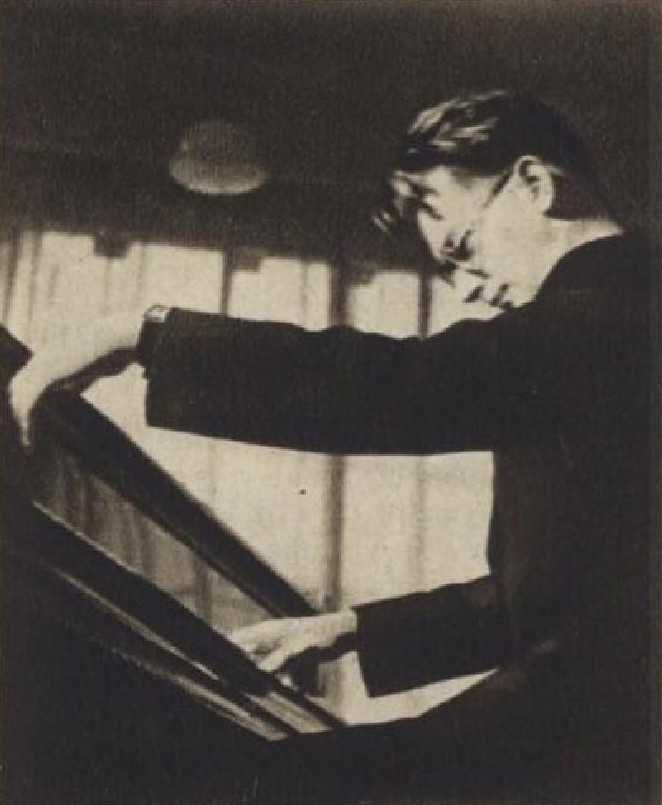
František Rauch

František Rauch (4 February 1910 – 23 September 1996) was a Czech pianist and music teacher.

== Life and career ==
Born in Plzeň, the son of a music instrument dealer, Rauch attended a business school in Plzeň before studying piano at the Prague Conservatory and composition with Vítězslav Novák. Before he began his career as a pianist, he worked for several months in the piano factory of August Förster.

Rauch became known as a chamber musician, including pianist of the esteemed Pražské Trio with Bruno Bělčík and František Smetana, and as a concert pianist. His repertoire focused on compositions by Beethoven, Smetana, Liszt, Schumann and Vítězslav Novák. In Poland he was in demand as interpreter of the works of Chopin.

Rauch made around 60 recordings (mainly for Supraphon), including the piano cycle Pan and other piano works by his teacher Novák. As president of the Czech Chopin Society, he was the promoter of the Chopin Festival in Mariánské Lázně. He taught at the Prague Conservatory from 1939 for more than forty years and was the teacher of musicians such as Petr Eben, Valentina Kameníková, Ivan Klánský and the harpsichordist Zuzana Růžičková. In 1975 he acted as a jury member for the first Paloma O'Shea Santander International Piano Competition.

Rauch died in Prague at age 86.
