= Carlo Zecchi =

Italian conductor and pianist (1903–1984)

Carlo Zecchi in 1957

Carlo Zecchi (8 July 1903 – 31 August 1984) was an Italian pianist, music teacher and conductor.

Zecchi was born in Rome. A pupil of F. Baiardi for piano and of L. Refice and A. Bustini for composition, he began his career as a concert pianist at only seventeen years of age. He later studied piano with Ferruccio Busoni and Artur Schnabel in Berlin. In 1938, he stopped playing the piano to study conducting with Hans Münch and Antonio Guarnieri. He led pianistic courses in Accademia Nazionale di Santa Cecilia, Rome, and in Salzburg. He was a highly acclaimed performer of the works of Domenico Scarlatti, Wolfgang Amadeus Mozart, Claude Debussy and of other Romantic music. He died in Salzburg.

== Sources ==
- "Zecchi Carlo". Internetowa encyklopedia PWN (in Polish). Wydawnictwo Naukowe PWN. Archived from the original on 2011-06-07.
