= Barbara Hesse-Bukowska =

Polish pianist (1930–2013)

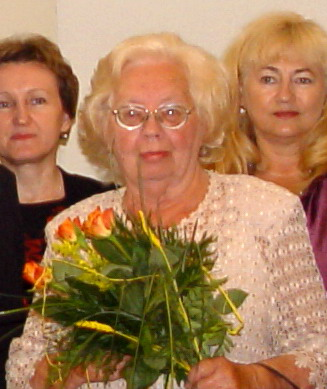
Barbara Hesse-Bukowska in 2008

Barbara Stella Hesse-Bukowska (8 February 1930 – 9 December 2013) was a Polish pianist. Her family had a long-standing musical history, as her father was a violinist and conductor, her mother was a pianist and teacher, and her grandfather was a piano tuner. Her mother was her first teacher. Her subsequent teachers included Czesław Aniołkiewicz and, at the Warsaw Conservatory, Maria Glińska-Wąsowska.

== Education and achievements ==
Hesse-Bukowska was born in Łódź. She graduated from Warsaw's State Higher School of Music in June 1949. In the same year, she took part in the first postwar edition of the IV International Chopin Piano Competition, and won 2nd prize. Five years later, she went to Paris, where she continued studies with Arthur Rubinstein. She subsequently undertook an intercontinental concert career, which she combined with teaching at Wrocław's Higher School of Music. In 1972, Hesse-Bukowska became a professor at the Fryderyk Chopin Music Academy.

Her honours and awards included the Złoty Krzyż Zasługi (Cross of Merit; 1955) and the Order Sztandaru Pracy (Order of the Banner of Labour) 2nd class (1959) and 1st class (1984). Outside of Poland, in 1962, she was awarded the Harriet Cohen Foundation's Piano Medal.
