= Bernard Ringeissen =

French pianist (1934–2025)

Ringeissen in middle age

Bernard Marc Louis Édouard Ringeissen (15 May 1934 – 4 April 2025) was a French classical pianist.

== Biography ==
Ringeissen was born in Paris on 15 May 1934. His first teacher, at age seven, was Georges de Lausnay. He entered its Conservatoire National Supérieur de Musique in 1947, aged twelve, and won the Premier Prix when he was sixteen. He had further study with Marguerite Long and Jacques Février. In 1953, he temporarily retired from public performance, to focus on music competition.

In 1954, he won equal 2nd Prize with Sergio Scopelliti at the Alfredo Casella Competition in Naples. He also won the International Music Performance Competition in Geneva that year. In 1955, he won fourth prize at the V International Chopin Piano Competition in Warsaw; then equal second Prize with Dimitri Bashkirov at the Marguerite Long-Jacques Thibaud International Competition (no first Prize was awarded that year). In 1962, he won first prize at the Rio de Janeiro International Competition and the Villa-Lobos Special Prize for his interpretation of Brazilian music.

He performed widely and served on competition juries in many countries. He taught in Rueil-Malmaison, and gave master-classes at the Salzburg Mozarteum and at the International Summer Seminar in Weimar.

Ringeissen died in Gisors on 4 April 2025, at the age of 90.

== Discography ==
His recordings include the complete piano works by Francis Poulenc (3 LP Adès-7090), Camille Saint-Saëns (5 LP Adès-7069) and Igor Stravinsky (4 LP Adès-7074), by Charles-Valentin Alkan Sonatina / Zorcico / Scherzo / Nocturne / Gigue / Marche / Barcarolle / Saltarelle (LP Harmonia Mundi France – HMA 190927), Symphonie / Ouverture / Etudes, Op.39 (CD Marco Polo – 8.223285) and 12 Études, Op. 35 / Le Festin d'Esope / Scherzo Diabolico (CD Marco Polo – 8.223351), by Frédéric Chopin Etude Op.25/11 / Mazurka Op.30/2 (78 rpm Muza – 2687), Etudes Op.10 [4,10] / Etudes Op.25 [2,6,11,12] / Ballade No.1 Op.23 / Scherzo No.3 Op.39 (LP Erato – EFM 42080), Berceuse Op.57 / Fantaisie-Impromptu Op.66 (EP Barclay – 79.015 M), Ballade No.4 Op.52 / Etude Op.10/4 / Nocturne Op.62/2 / Scherzo No.3 Op.39 (LP Polskie Nagrania Muza – L 0061), 24 Preludes Op.28 (LP Wifon–040), Andante Spianato et Grande Polonaise Op.22 / Barcarolle Op.60 / Écossaises Op.72 / Fantaisie Op.49 / Scherzo No.4 Op.54 / Berceuse Op.57 (LP Ades-14.012), selected piano works by Józef Wieniawski (MC Wifon-0186), selected piano works by Aminollah Hossein (LP Edici – ED 52724), a collection of 'Famous Studies for Piano' by Carl Czerny, Ignaz Moscheles, Moritz Moszkowski, Karol Szymanowski, Franz Liszt, Gabriel Pierné, Frédéric Chopin, Camille Saint-Saëns, Sergei Rachmaninoff, Alexander Scriabin (LP Columbia – SMC 95048), by Louis Abbiate Piano Sonatas Nos. 4, 5, 6 (LP Calliope – CAL 1873) and the 2 Cello Sonatas with Dimitry Markevitch, cello (LP Calliope – CAL 1862), Maurice Ravel's Gaspard de la nuit (LP Polskie Nagrania Muza – L 0061), the music for Two Pianos and Piano 4 hands by Claude Debussy with Noël Lee (2 LP Valois MB 1411–1412), a box with Russian music by the "Groupe des cinq" -Modest Mussorgsky, Mily Balakirev, Nikolay Rimsky-Korsakov, César Cui and Alexander Borodin- (3 LP Adès-7081); together with Baritone Jean-Christophe Benoit 4 Song Cycles by Maurice Ravel (LP Adès-10.002), 5 Piano Pieces and 19 Mélodies by Reynaldo Hahn (LP Adès-14.003), and 16 Chansons by Joseph Kosma (LP Adès-14.001). Among others, his chamber music recordings include a 1957 Cello Sonatas disc with Leslie Parnas, cello (LP Pathé – ASTX 123), by Franz Joseph Haydn 12 Trios for piano (3 LP French Decca 7.317/319) and 8 Sonatas for violin and piano (3 LP French Decca 7.236/239) with Jacques-Francis Manzone, violin and Frédéric Lodéon, cello, by Ernest Chausson 'Concert' for Violin Piano and String Quartet with Jean-Pierre Wallez, violin (LP Adès-14.043). He also recorded Poulenc's Concerto in D minor for Two Pianos and Orchestra, with Gabriel Tacchino and the Monte-Carlo Philharmonic Orchestra under Georges Prêtre (LP EMI Pathé Marconi – 7473692).
