= Piotr Paleczny =

Polish classical pianist (born 1946)

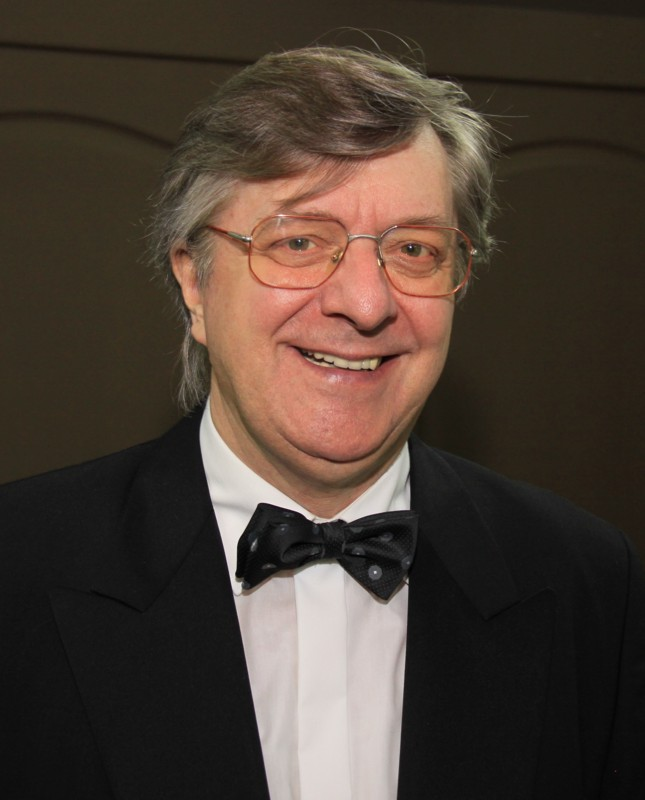
- Piotr Paleczny, Busko-Zdrój, Poland, 5 July 2009

Background information
- Born: Piotr Paleczny; 10 May 1946 (age 80); Rybnik, Poland
- Genres: Classical music
- Occupations: Musician, Classical pianist, Educator
- Instrument: Piano
- Website: Official Page of FCUM

Piotr Paleczny (born 10 May 1946 in Rybnik, Poland) is a Polish classical pianist. He won the 3rd prize of the VIII International Chopin Piano Competition in 1970.

In 1990 he served on the jury of the Paloma O'Shea Santander International Piano Competition; in 2010 on The Sendai International Music Competition in Japan; and in 2011 on the jury of the Prix AmadèO de Piano 2011.

He teaches piano at the Fryderyk Chopin University of Music in Warsaw, and has been a professor at the university since 1998.
