= Jerzy Żurawlew =

Polish pianist and conductor (1886–1980)

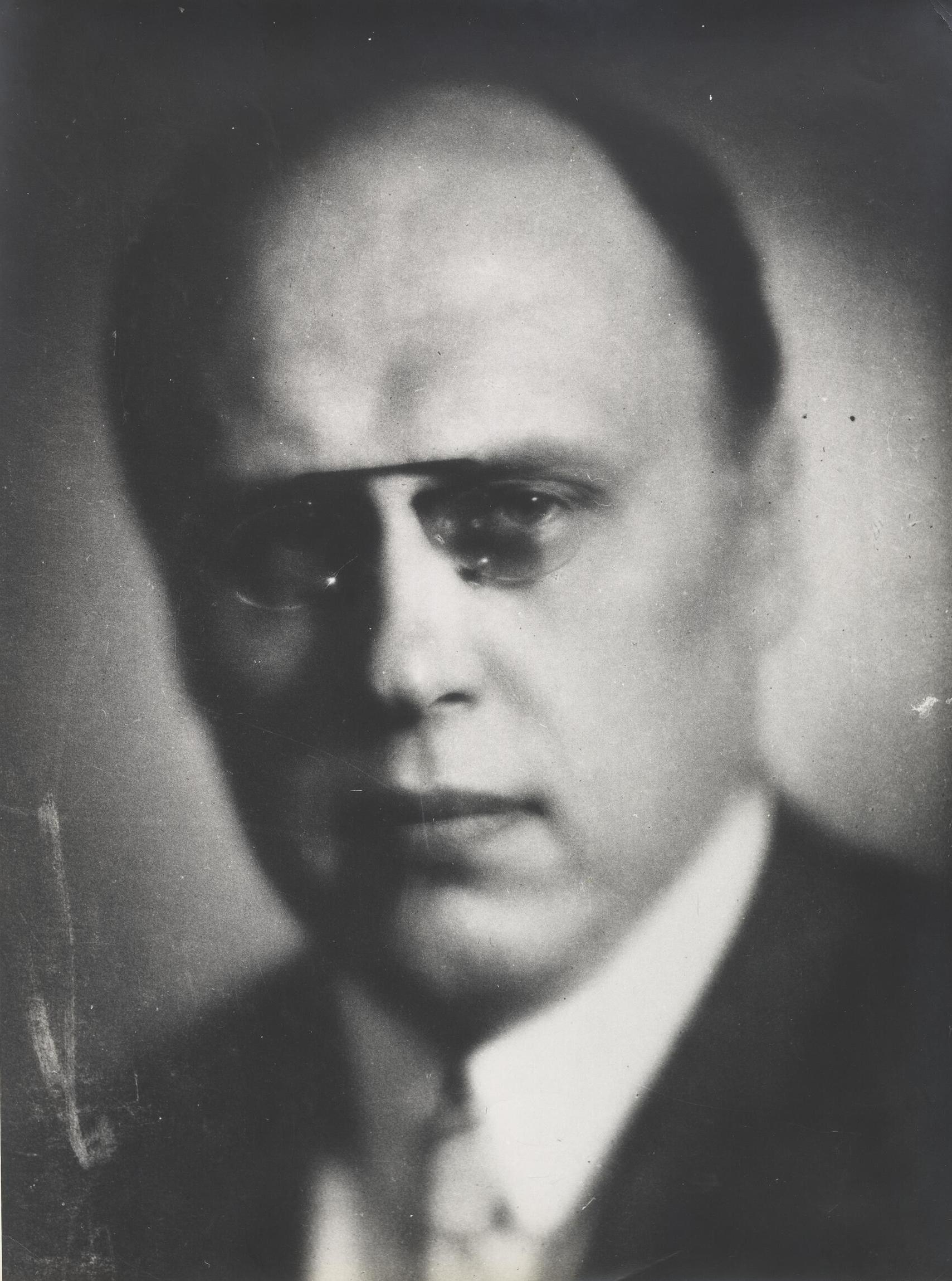

Jerzy Żurawlew (December 25, 1886 – October 3, 1980) was a Polish pianist, conductor, teacher, and founder of the International Chopin Piano Competition. He is known more for founding the International Chopin Piano Competition in 1927, after receiving funds. The first competition was held in 1927.

== Life ==
Żurawlew was born at Rostov-on-Don in Russia in 1886. He studied with Aleksander Michałowski at the Warsaw Conservatory until 1913, and taught there himself from 1923. In 1916 he founded a music school in Minsk (now Belarus), and in 1920 one in Białystok.

He was the founder of the International Chopin Piano Competition, at Warsaw in 1927. His lifelong friend, Henryk Rewkiewicz - businessman, music lover and board member of The Warsaw Music Society - offered his personal financial guarantees to help get the Competition off the ground.

Żurawlew died in Warsaw in 1980, aged 93.

== Sources ==
- J. Methuen-Campbell, Chopin Playing From The Composer To The Present Day (Gollancz, London 1981).
