= Kazimierz Sikorski =

Polish composer

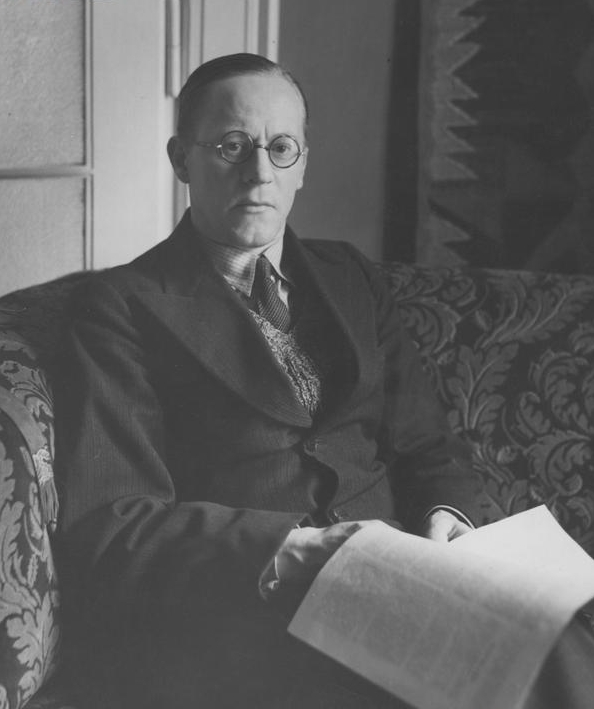

Background information
- Born: June 28, 1895; Zürich, Switzerland
- Origin: Poland
- Died: July 23, 1986 (aged 91) Warsaw, Poland
- Education: Warsaw Conservatory, University of Warsaw (Philosophy)
- Genre: Classical music
- Occupations: Composer; music teacher; rector; music theorist
- Years active: c. 1920s–1986
- Awards: National Music Award (1935); Order of Polonia Restituta (1937, 1955); Award of the Polish Composers’ Union; Banner of Labour Order, First Class (1960); Jurzykowski Foundation Award (1981)

Kazimierz Sikorski (June 28, 1895 – July 23, 1986) was a Polish composer. His arrangement of the "Mazurek Dąbrowskiego" (Poland Is Not Yet Lost) is currently used as the Polish national anthem.

== Biography ==
Sikorski was born in Zurich, but studied in Warsaw, first music at the Warsaw Conservatory and then philosophy at the University of Warsaw. He then studied in Lwów, which was Polish at the time, where he was a student of Adolf Chybiński, and Paris under Nadia Boulanger. In 1926, he became a teacher of composition at the Conservatory of Poznań. From 1927 to 1945, he taught at the Warsaw Conservatory. He was rector of the State Higher School of Music in Łódź. From 1951 to 1966, he taught music theory and composition at the Music Academy Warsaw. See: List of music students by teacher: R to S#Kazimierz Sikorski. During this time, he was president of the Polish Composers' Union.

He received many awards and honours, including: the National Music Award (1935), the Order of Polonia Restituta (1937), State Award first and second degree (1951, 1955, 1964, 1966), the Award of the Polish Composers’ Union (1951, 1975), the Gold Cross of Merit (1952), Commander's Cross of the Order of Polonia Restituta (1955), the Banner of Labour Order, First Class (1960), the Jurzykowski Foundation Award (1981). He died in Warsaw, aged 91.

He was the father of the composer, Tomasz Sikorski.

== Composition ==
Sikorski composed six symphonies, a symphonic allegro, two overtures (1945, 1954), some instrumental concertos, of which the clarinet concerto (1947) is the most important, a string sextet, three string quartets, choral and film music, including the music for the film Warsaw Premiere (Polish: Warszawska premiera), for which he won a State Award.

== Selected works ==
- Symphony No. 2 (1922)
- Stabat Mater, Oratorio for 4 Solo Voices, Mixed Choir and Orchestra (1948, 1950)
- Concerto for Flute and Orchestra (1957)
- Concerto for Trumpet, String Orchestra, 4 Kettledrums, Xylophone and Tam-tam (1960)
- Poliphonic Concerto for Bassoon and Orchestra (1965)
- Symphony No. 4 (1969)
- Four Polonaises of Versailles for Strings (after Manuscripts from the 18th and 19th c.) (1974)

== Selected filmography ==
- Warsaw Premiere (1951)
