= Guido Agosti =

Italian pianist and piano teacher (1901–1989)

Guido Agosti (11 August 1901 – 2 June 1989) was an Italian pianist and piano teacher.

Agosti was born in Forlì in 1901. He studied piano with Ferruccio Busoni, Bruno Mugellini and Filippo Ivaldi, earning his diploma at age 13. He studied counterpoint under Giacomo Benvenuti and literature at Bologna University. He commenced his professional career as a pianist in 1921. Although he never entirely abandoned concert-giving, nerves made it difficult for him to appear on stage, and he concentrated on teaching. He taught piano at the Venice Conservatoire and at the Santa Cecilia Academy in Rome. In 1947 he was appointed Professor of piano at the Accademia Musicale Chigiana (Siena). He also taught at Weimar and the Sibelius Academy in Helsinki.

His notable students include Maria Tipo, Yonty Solomon, Bedana Chertkow, Leslie Howard, Barbara Lister-Sink, Martin Jones, Donna Amato, Vladimir Krpan, Hamish Milne, Dag Achatz, Sergio Calligaris, Raymond Lewenthal, Kun-Woo Paik, Paul Stewart, Daniel Pollack, William Corbett Jones, Ian Munro, and Lucia Passaglia.

He made very few recordings; his recording of preludes by Debussy was highly praised. He also recorded Mussorgsky and Janáček. His piano transcription of three movements from Stravinsky’s The Firebird (1928, dedicated to the memory of his teacher Busoni) is in the repertoire. Agosti also made an edition of Beethoven's 32 Variations in C minor, WoO 80.

He played chamber music with the flautist Severino Gazzelloni and the cellist Enrico Mainardi.

Ernest Bloch’s Piano Sonata was written for Agosti.

Guido Agosti died in Milan in June 1989.
