= Zbigniew Drzewiecki =

Polish pianist

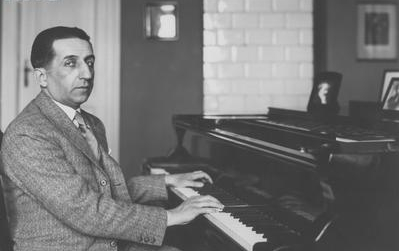
- Drzewiecki in the 1930s
- Born: 8 April 1890; Warsaw, Poland
- Died: 11 April 1971 (aged 81)
- Occupations: Pianist, pedagogue

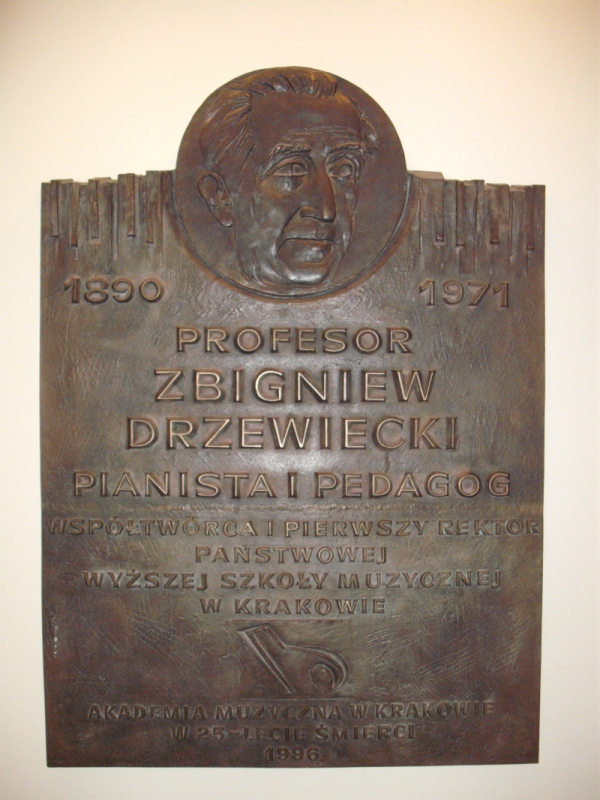
Drzewiecki's memorial plaque, Academy of Music in Kraków

Zbigniew Drzewiecki (Polish pronunciation: [ˈzbiɡɲɛv dʐɛˈvjɛt͡skʲi]; 8 April 1890 – 11 April 1971) was a Polish pianist who was for most of his life a teacher of pianists. He was especially associated with the interpretation of Frédéric Chopin's works. His pupils include several famous pianists of the 20th century, and his influence was therefore very pervasive.

== Biography ==
Drzewiecki was born in Warsaw. He commenced study under his father, and then, at Warsaw, under Oberfeldt and Pilecki. After he had matriculated he went (from 1909 to 1914) to Vienna to the atelier of Theodor Leschetizky, where he studied with Marie Prentner, the master's assistant. He gave many recitals in Polish towns, and also in Vienna, Prague and Berlin.

In 1916 he became professor of advanced pianoforte classes at the Warsaw Conservatory, and continued to teach there until his death in 1971. He assisted in establishing the International Chopin Piano Competition, and served upon their juries from the first occasion, 1927, until 1971. After the Second World War, and especially after the death of Józef Turczyński (1884–1953), he was considered the greatest Polish piano teacher.

== Students ==
The following is an incomplete list of pianists who studied with Drzewiecki:

- Ryszard Bakst
- Enrique Bátiz Campbell
- Felicja Blumental
- Walter Buczynski
- Paweł Chęciński
- Halina Czerny-Stefańska
- Jan Ekier
- Róża Etkin-Moszkowska
- Kazio (Kazimierz) Gelernter
- Lidia Grychtołówna
- Izio Hamerman
- Adam Harasiewicz
- Halina Kalmanowicz
- Władysław Kędra
- Bolesław Kon
- Li QiFang
- Helena Landau
- Hiroko Nakamura
- Edward Olearczyk
- Eva Osińska
- Regina Smendzianka
- Marta Sosińska
- Richard Spira (Ryszard Szpira) (1923-1942)
- John Tilbury
- Fou Ts'ong
- Roger Woodward
- Eva Maria Zuk
- Tea Zusman

== Orders and Decorations ==
- Order of the Banner of Labour 1st Class (1959)
- Commander's Cross with Star of the Order of Polonia Restituta (April 28, 1955)
- Commander's Cross of the Order of Polonia Restituta (July 22, 1951)
- Officer's Cross of the Order of Polonia Restituta (November 8, 1930)

== Sources ==
=== Bibliography ===
- A. Eaglefield-Hull, Dictionary of Modern Music and Musicians (Dent, London 1924).
- J. Methuen-Campbell, Chopin Playing from the Composer to the Present Day (Gollancz, London 1981).
- Drzewiecki, Zbigniew. Wspomnienia muzyka. (Polskie Wydawnictwo Muzyczne, Kraków 2010).
