= Emanuel Grossman =

Soviet pianist and teacher (1913–1954)

Emanuel Grossman Эммануил Гроссман
- Grossman in 1932

Background information
- Born: February 17, 1913; Moscow, Russia
- Died: January 14, 1954 (aged 40) Moscow, Soviet Union
- Education: Moscow Conservatory
- Occupations: Pianist; piano teacher

Emanuel or Emmanuil Iosifovich Grossman (Russian: Эммануил Иосифович Гроссман; February 17, 1913 – January 14, 1954) (Note: His age at death is given as 41 in the Chopin Institute biography, but its dates, February 17, 1913 to January 14, 1954, give 40.) was a Soviet pianist and piano teacher. A pupil of Heinrich Neuhaus at the Moscow Conservatory, he won a prize at the II International Chopin Piano Competition in Warsaw in 1932 and third prize at the All-Union Competition of Performing Musicians in Moscow a year later.

Grossman dedicated himself to teaching rather than performing, becoming a lecturer at age 22. He taught at the Moscow Conservatory and the Gnessin Institute. He died of Parkinson's disease at the age of 40.

== Early life and education ==
Grossman was born in Moscow on February 17, 1913. He was born to an Ashkenazi Jewish family, and his father was Iosif (Joseph) Grossman. He studied piano at the Moscow Conservatory in the class of Heinrich Neuhaus and received his diploma in 1932. He had already begun teaching in 1931, more than a year before his graduation. After completing his studies at the conservatory, he continued working with Neuhaus as a postgraduate student and later as his assistant.

== Career ==
In March 1932, Grossman traveled to Warsaw to compete in the second edition of the International Chopin Piano Competition, where he was awarded eleventh prize. (Note: The Chopin Institute biography calls him a tenth-prize winner in its opening sentence but an eleventh-prize winner in the text. The competition's official results list eleventh prize.) Among his Soviet fellow competitors, Abram Lufer, Leonid Sagalov, and Teodor Gutman placed fourth, sixth, and eighth. A year later, he received third prize at the All-Union Competition of Performing Musicians in Moscow.

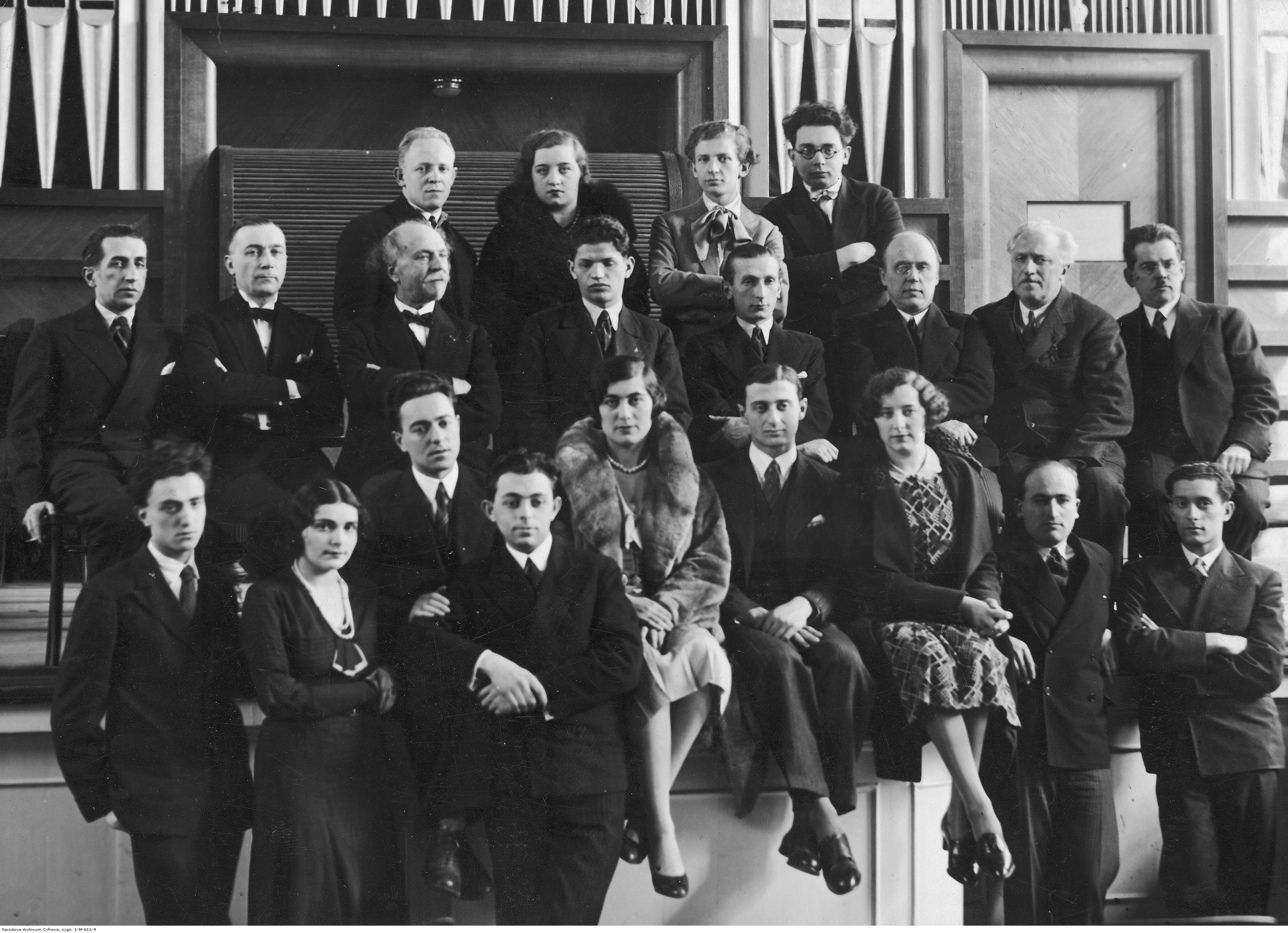
Grossman (bottom row, far left) with competitors and jurors of the Chopin competition in Warsaw (1932)

According to the Soviet Musical Encyclopedic Dictionary, Grossman was a soloist of the Moscow Philharmonic from 1933 to 1952, and taught at the Moscow Conservatory from 1931 to 1952, becoming a docent in 1935. From 1943 to 1951 he also led a piano class at the Gnessin Musical Pedagogical Institute in Moscow.

Grossman died in Moscow on January 14, 1954, of Parkinson's disease, aged 40.
