= Constantini =

Constantini is an Italian surname. Notable people with the surname include:

- Claudio Constantini, Peruvian pianist
- Dietmar Constantini (1955–2024), Austrian footballer and manager
- Eduardo Constantini, Argentine
- Lilian Constantini (1902–1982), born Liliane Chapiro-Volpert, French actress in the 1920s and 1930s
- Maria-Grazzia Constantini (in marriage Lacedelli, born 1943), Italian curler
- María Teresa Constantini, Argentine actress
- Shlomi Constantini, Israeli neurosurgeon
- Stefania Constantini, Italian curler
- François Xavier Constantini, French cybernetics expert

== See also ==
- Constantine (disambiguation)
