= Maryla Jonas =

Polish musician (1911–1959)

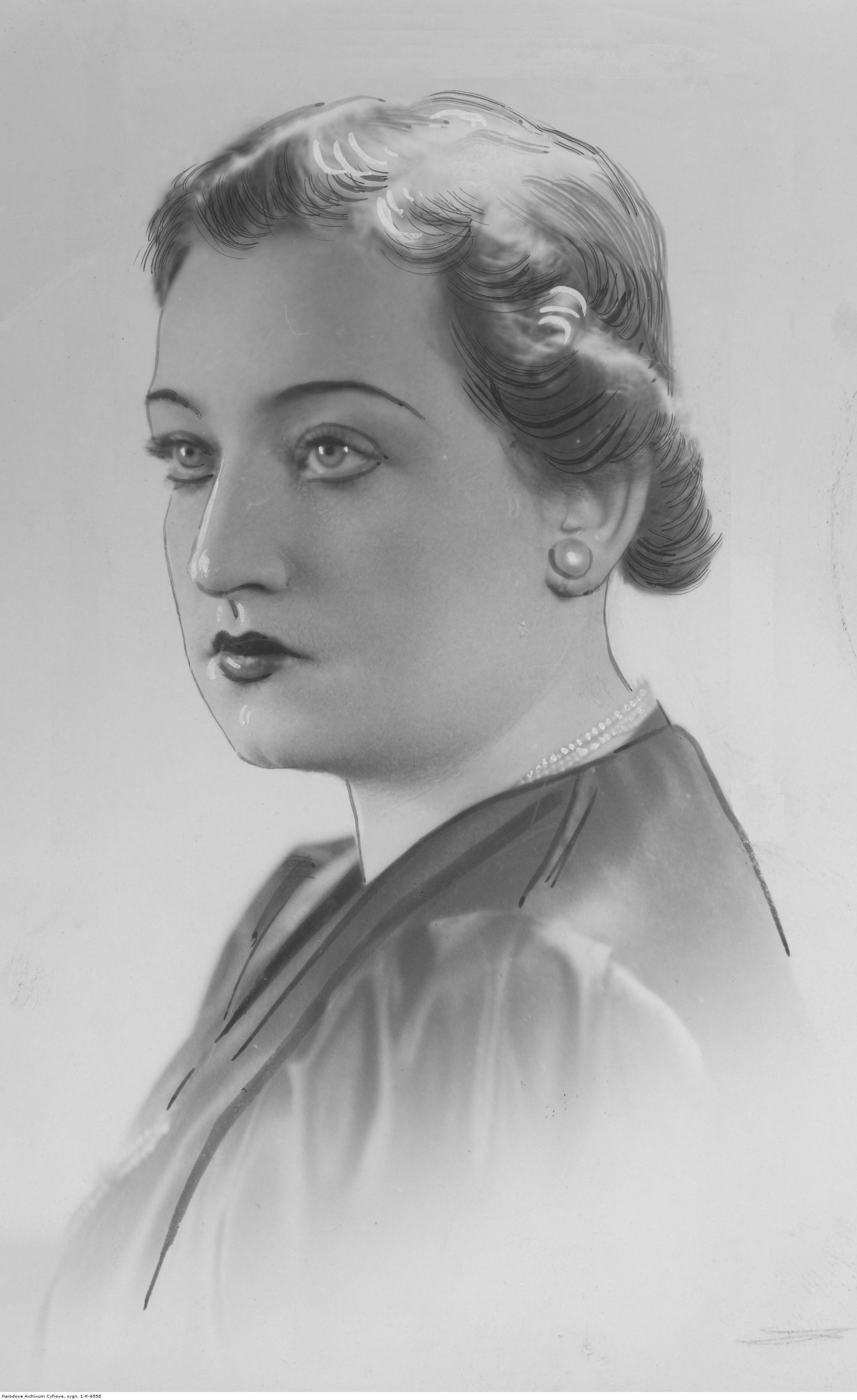
Maryla Jonas

Maryla Jonas (born Maryla Jonasówna; May 31, 1911 – July 3, 1959), was a Polish-born classical pianist, who escaped Nazism to settle in Brazil and later the United States.

Jonas was born into a Jewish family in Warsaw, Poland, debuting her pianistic talent at the age of 8 or 9. In spite of Jonas's father's misgivings about a career in piano performance, Jonas studied with the Polish pianist Ignacy Jan Paderewski, as a fellow pupil of Witold Małcużyński and Halina Czerny-Stefańska, and made her debut with the Warsaw Philharmonic in 1920. Jonas's adult career started in 1926 with a tour of various European capitals starting in Germany. Her touring career proved successful and paved the way for a 13th-place finish in the second II International Chopin Piano Competition in 1932. Alexander Uninsky took first prize in the same competition. In 1933 Jonas won the Beethoven prize of Vienna and following her victory established a successful European-based performance career.

Jonas's success in establishing herself as a European touring pianist was overshadowed in 1939 by the German invasion of Poland. She refused the invitation of a Gestapo agent to move to Berlin and perform in a safer environment. As a result, Jonas was arrested and remained in custody for several weeks. A German officer who had once heard her perform in Germany took pity on her and had her released. The German officer advised Jonas to travel to Berlin and visit the Brazilian Embassy for aid. Jonas took the German officer's advice and traveled to Berlin on foot, walking several hundred miles short of food and without recourse to safe shelter. The long walk likely seriously damaged Jonas's health and may have contributed to her death at the age of 48.

The embassy supplied Jonas with false records that made her out to be the wife of the ambassador's son. Jonas traveled from Berlin to Lisbon and finally settled in Rio de Janeiro, the capital of Brazil. In 1940, while residing in Brazil, Jonas suffered a nervous breakdown and lived several months in sanatoria. When it looked as though she was on the mend, she received the painful news that one of her brothers had been killed; this was followed by news that her husband and parents had also died. These painful losses made the prospects of her future as a pianist appear unlikely. Jonas's sister and Arthur Rubinstein, another famous Polish pianist, offered their support to Jonas and opened the possibility for her to return to performing and recording piano music. She resumed her career in New York City, making her debut at Carnegie Hall in February 1946.
