= Ghadimi =

Ghadimi is a surname. Notable people with the surname include:

- Masoud Ghadimi (1965–2003), Iranian wrestler
- Vincent Ghadimi (born 1968), Belgian pianist and composer, piano and solfège professor and accompanist
