= Jazz in der Kirche =

Jazz in der Kirche is a biennial jazz festival in Mönchengladbach, Germany, with concerts of international artists in churches, first held in 2004.

The festival is organized by the Fachbereich Weiterbildung und Musik, Musikförderung (Musical education and music) of Mönchengladbach, the Catholic and Protestant parishes, and the Arbeitsgemeinschaft der Kirchenmusiker/- innen (Association of church musicians). The festival idea is to focus on churches as places for meditation, sensitivity, silence and music, and to show modernity by presenting jazz ("Veranstaltungsort Kirche sowohl als Platz der Meditation, Sinnlichkeit, Stille und Musik als auch als Fixpunkt der Modernität durch die Präsentation von Jazz ins Blickfeld bündeln"). The cooperation with the local church musicians, especially those of the Diocese of Aachen, led to the invitation of notable international performers, in addition to local musicians including those from the Netherlands owing to the city being near the Dutch border. In cooperation with the local music school, workshops for gospel and jazz are held and typically followed by presentation in ecumenical services.

In 2004, 14 concerts were attended by more than 2500 people. The opening concert was performed by the WDR Big Band Köln. Other artists included the gospel singer Melbra Rai and the organist Barbara Dennerlein.

In 2006, 13 concerts were performed. Among the musicians were trumpeters Markus Stockhausen and Markus Türk, Lydia van Dam, Ramesh Shotham and the Dutch pianist Jasper van't Hof.

Highlights of the 2008 festival were concerts by Leonid Chizhik and band, Wolfgang Seifen and Leonard Gincberg, and Nicolas Simion and band, among others. The local JazzChor performed on several occasions.
