= Ibiza International Piano Competition =

European piano contest

Ibiza International Piano Competition is a European piano contest founded in 1987 by Jaume Ferrer Marí, President of the Centro Cultural de San Carlos, a charity organization located in Sant Carles de Peralta, Santa Eularia des Riu, Ibiza. The XXV Ibiza International Piano Competition will take place in September 2023. It usually takes place at Centro Cultural de San Carlos and it is preceded by the Ibiza International Music Festival. From 1999, H.R.H. Princess Irene of Greece is the President of Honour.

== History ==
Since 1987, the Ibiza International Piano Competition is one of the most prestigious European contests. The main goals are to discover new talented pianists and young pianists (without limitations of nationality or residence) and push their careers. There are two different categories: Young pianists (under 16 years old) and Pianists (under 30 years old). The competition takes place during a week with only one round. The awards are made public in a ceremony that includes a concert by the winners. The winners of each contest are invited to perform a concert in the next Festival and be members of the Jury in the following edition. The competition is sponsored by public entities and private donors.

== Jury ==
Musicians from around the world are invited to be part of the Jury, according to their accomplishments in the field of music and practise music. Past jurors have included Julian von Károlyi (Hungary), George Hadjinikos (Greece), Peter Donohoe (UK), Joaquín Soriano (Spain), Aquiles Delle Vigne (Belgium), Antonio Baciero (Spain), Ilan Rogoff (Israel), Perfecto García Chornet (Spain), Lukas David (Austria), Mary Wu (China), Erling Dahl (Norway), Tomislav Nedelkovic-Baynov (Bulgaria), Tatiana Franova (Slovaquia), Thomas Hecht (USA), Agustín González Acilu (Spain), María Ángeles Ferrer Forés (Spain), Maximino Zumalave (Spain), Sira Hernández (Spain), Suzanne Bradbury (USA)...

== List of winners ==
XXIV Competition (2021) Pianist: Hehuan Yu (China). Young Pianist: Máximo Klyetsun (Portugal).

XXIII Competition (2019) Pianist: Aisylu Saliakhova (Rusia). Young Pianist: Arthur Samuel Coatalen (Francia-Hungría).

XXII Competition (2017) Pianist: Shih-Hsien Yeh (Taiwán). Young Pianist: Miguel Iglesias Lista (España).

XXI Competition (2015) Pianist: Christina Hyun Ah Choi (Corea del Sur). Young Pianist: Noel Redolar (España).

XX Competition (2013) Pianist: Sasha Grynyuk(Ucrania). Young Pianist: Matias Novak (República Checa).

XIX Competition (2010) Pianist: Renata Benvegnù (Italia). Young Pianist: Alexander Voronstov (Rusia).

XVIII Competition (2008) Pianist: Fan-Chiang Yi (Taiwán). Young Pianist: Francisco Miguel Freire dos Reis (Portugal).

XVII Competition (2005) Pianist: Giovanni Doria-Miglietta (Italia). Young Pianist: Abigail Sin (Singapur).

XVI Competition (2003) Pianist: Alexandre Pirojenko (Rusia). Young Pianist: Artiom Akopyan (Rusia).

XV Competition (2001) Pianist: Daria Tschaikovskaya (Rusia). Young Pianist: Konstadinos Valianatos (Grecia).

XIV Competition (2000) Pianist: Eugeni Ganev (Bulgaria). Young Pianist: Diana Brekalo (Alemania).

XIII Competition (1999) Pianist: Sofya Melikyan (Armenia). Young Pianist: Alisa Mbá Ebebele (Ucrania).

XII Competition (1998) Pianist: Vadim Gladkov (Ucrania). Young Pianist: Desierto. Children Pianist under 14 años: Gabrielle Delle Vigne (Bélgica). Children Pianist under 10 años: Beatriz Blanco Barriga (España).

XI Competition (1997) Pianist: Liubomir Daskalov (Bulgaria). Young Pianist: Alexandra Golubitskaya (Rusia). Children Pianist under 14 años: Pavel Chatski (Rusia). Children Pianist under 10 años: María Moratinos Martín (España).

X Competition (1996) Pianist: Sung Hee Kim-Wüst (Corea del Sur). Young Pianist: Desierto. Children Pianist under 14 años: Desierto. Niños Children Pianist under 10 años: María José Perete Marco (España).

IX Competition (1995) Pianist: Vincent D. Ghadimi (Bélgica). Young Pianist: Mario Bernardo Fernández (España). Children Pianist under 14 años: Jordi Nogués Escribà (España). Children Pianist under 10 años: Pedro Guasch Ribas (España).

VIII Competition (1994) Pianist: Isabel Clara Soler Bordería (España). Young Pianist: Desierto. Children Pianist under 14: María del Hoyo Pérez de Rada (España). NiChildren Pianist under 10: Verónica Perete Marco (España).

VII Competition (1993) Pianist: Sergio Sapena Martínez (España). Young Pianist: Jesús Polonio Reberiego (España). Niños Children Pianist under 14 años: Desierto. Niños Children Pianist under 10 años: Antonio Martínez Sykora (España).

VI Competition (1992) Pianist: Miguel Lecueder Canabarro (Uruguay), Ricardo Descalzo (España). Young Pianist: Kiev Portella (España). Niños Children Pianist under 14 años: Alba Felipe Konecna (España). Children Pianist under 10 años: Cristina Portolés Gordillo (España).

V Competition (1991) Pianist: Albert Díaz Rosselló (España). Young Pianist: Esteban Ruiz Fenollera (España). Children Pianist under 15 años: Eugenio Fernández Fernández (España). Children Pianist under 13 años: Hannah Hüglin (Alemania). Children Pianist under 10 años: Claudio Torres del Moral (España).

IV Competition (1990) Pianist: Marina Palmer Wulff (Alemania). Young Pianist: Paula Coronas Valle (España). Children Pianist under 15 años: Desierto. Children Pianist under 13 años: Cecilia Ribas Galumbo (España). NChildren Pianist under 10 años: Gema Torres del Moral (España).

III Competition (1989) Pianist: Desierto. Young Pianist: María Victoria Cortés Pomacondor (España). Children Pianist under 15 años: David Gracia Gil (España). Children Pianist under 13 años: Desierto. Children Pianist under 10 años: David Müller Thyssen (España).

II Competition (1988) Pianist: Julia Supinova (República Checa). Young Pianist: Paula Coronas Valle (España). Children Pianist under 15 años: María Belén Martín Piles (España). Children Pianist under 13 años: Eliseo Perales Belda (España). Children Pianist under 10 años: Carlos Moret Marín (España).

I Competition (1987) Pianist: María Ángeles Ferrer Forés (España). Joven Pianist: Elvira Ramón Riera (España). Children Pianist under 13 años: Natasha Grout (Reino Unido). Children Pianist under 10 años: Kosima Jung (Alemania).

== Prizes and Acknowledgments ==
2019. Premio a la Experiencia Turística al Festival Internacional de Música de Ibiza y al Concurso Internacional de Piano de Ibiza otorgado por el Govern de les Illes Balears. Enlace con https://www.caib.es/govern/index.do?lang=ca 2017. Premio al Mérito Ciudadano de la Isla de Ibiza al Centro Cultural de San Carlos, otorgado por el Consell d’Eivissa. 2016. Premio Ramon Llull a Jaime Ferrer Marí, otorgado por el Gobierno de las Islas Baleares. 2013. Placa al Centro Cultural de San Carlos por la organización de 20 ediciones, otorgado por el Excmo. Ajuntament de Santa Eulària des Riu. 2013. Premio Xarc en reconocimiento a la labor de promoción y difusión de la música y la cultura alrededor del mundo, otorgado por el Excmo. Ajuntament de Santa Eulària des Riu. 2010. Placa de reconocimiento, otorgado por el Excmo. Ajuntament de Santa Eulària des Riu. 2008. Placa de reconocimiento, otorgado por el Excmo. Ajuntament de Santa Eulària des Riu. 1997. Premio Importante de Diario de Ibiza a Jaime Ferrer Marí, otorgado por Diario de Ibiza.
