= Leon Boruński =

Polish pianist and composer (1909–1942)

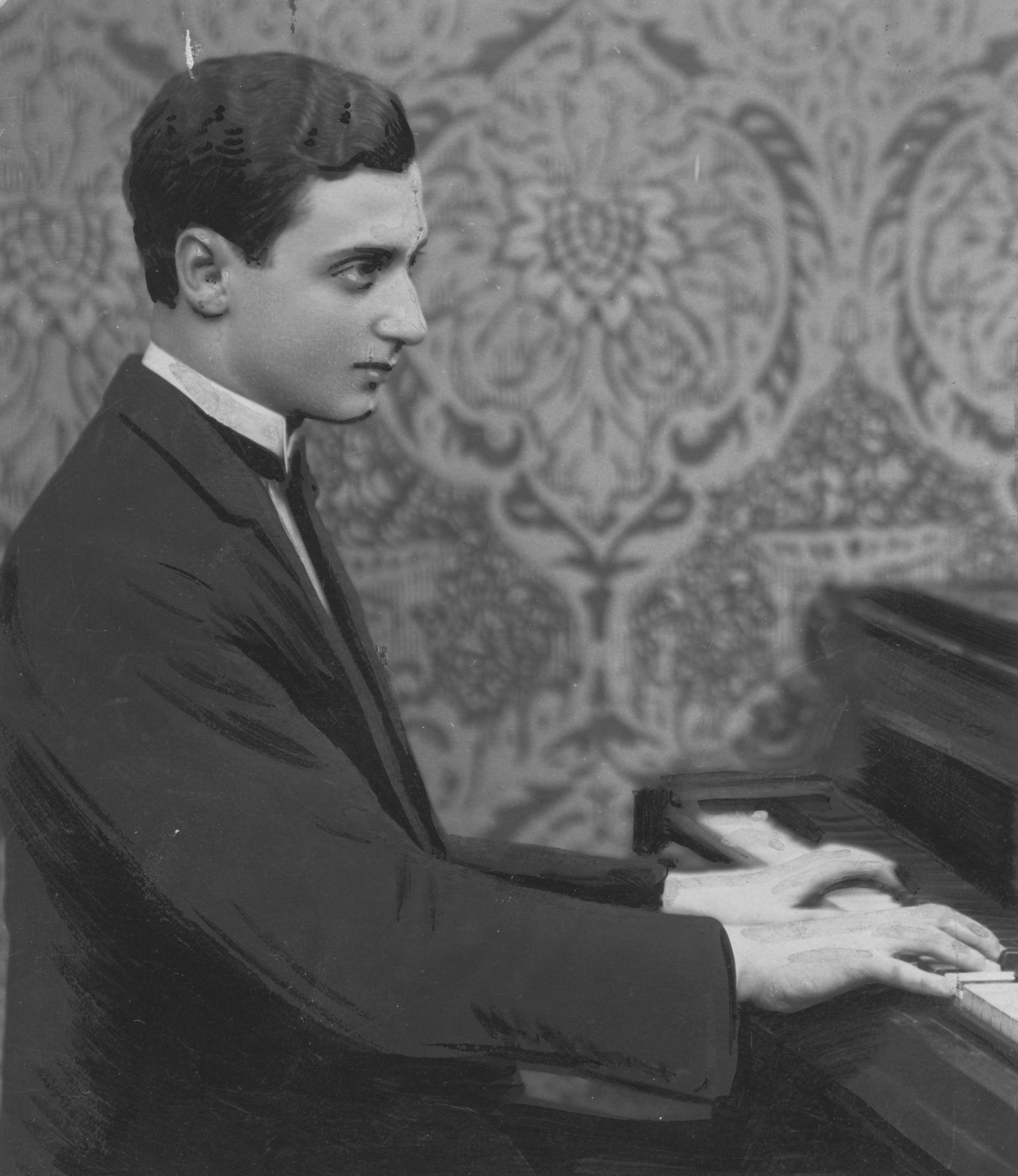
- Boruński at the piano, 1930

Background information
- Born: October 22, 1909; Saint Petersburg, Russian Empire
- Died: July 1942 (aged 32) Otwock, German-occupied Poland
- Genres: Classical; Jazz; Revue
- Occupations: Pianist; composer
- Instrument: Piano
- Years active: 1929–1942

Leon Boruński (October 22 [O.S. October 9] 1909 – July 1942) was a Polish pianist and composer. He was a finalist in the II International Chopin Piano Competition in 1932 and became active as both a concert pianist and a leading accompanist in Warsaw's interwar revue theatre scene. He composed classical, jazz, and theatrical music, though most of his works were lost during World War II. A Polish Jew, he was murdered during the Holocaust in Otwock in 1942.

== Early life and education ==
Boruński was born in Saint Petersburg, then part of the Russian Empire, to a family of Polish Jews. His father, Hersz Lejb Boruński, was a lawyer who went by the name Jerzy, and his mother was Berta, née Krukowska. Through his mother, Boruński was a cousin of the poet Julian Tuwim and the actor Kazimierz Krukowski. His older brother Włodzimierz Boruński (1906–1988) became an actor, director, poet, and satirist.

In 1918, the family moved to Łódź in central Poland. That same year, Boruński began studying piano under the music critic and pedagogue Feliks Rafał Halpern (1866–1942). From 1928 to 1932, he studied at the Fryderyk Chopin Higher School of Music (now the Chopin University of Music) in Warsaw, in the piano class of Józef Śmidowicz.

== Career ==
=== Interwar concert and competition career ===
Beginning in 1929, Boruński performed as a pianist in a piano duo with Henryk Wars at the Morskie Oko revue theatre in Warsaw. In March 1932, he competed in the II International Chopin Piano Competition, held at the National Philharmonic in Warsaw. He advanced to the finals and was awarded the seventh prize out of 67 participants from 14 countries. The competition's guest of honor was Maurice Ravel, and the first prize was won by Alexander Uninsky. In 1933, Boruński took part in the International Music Competition in Vienna, where he received a semi-finalist's diploma.

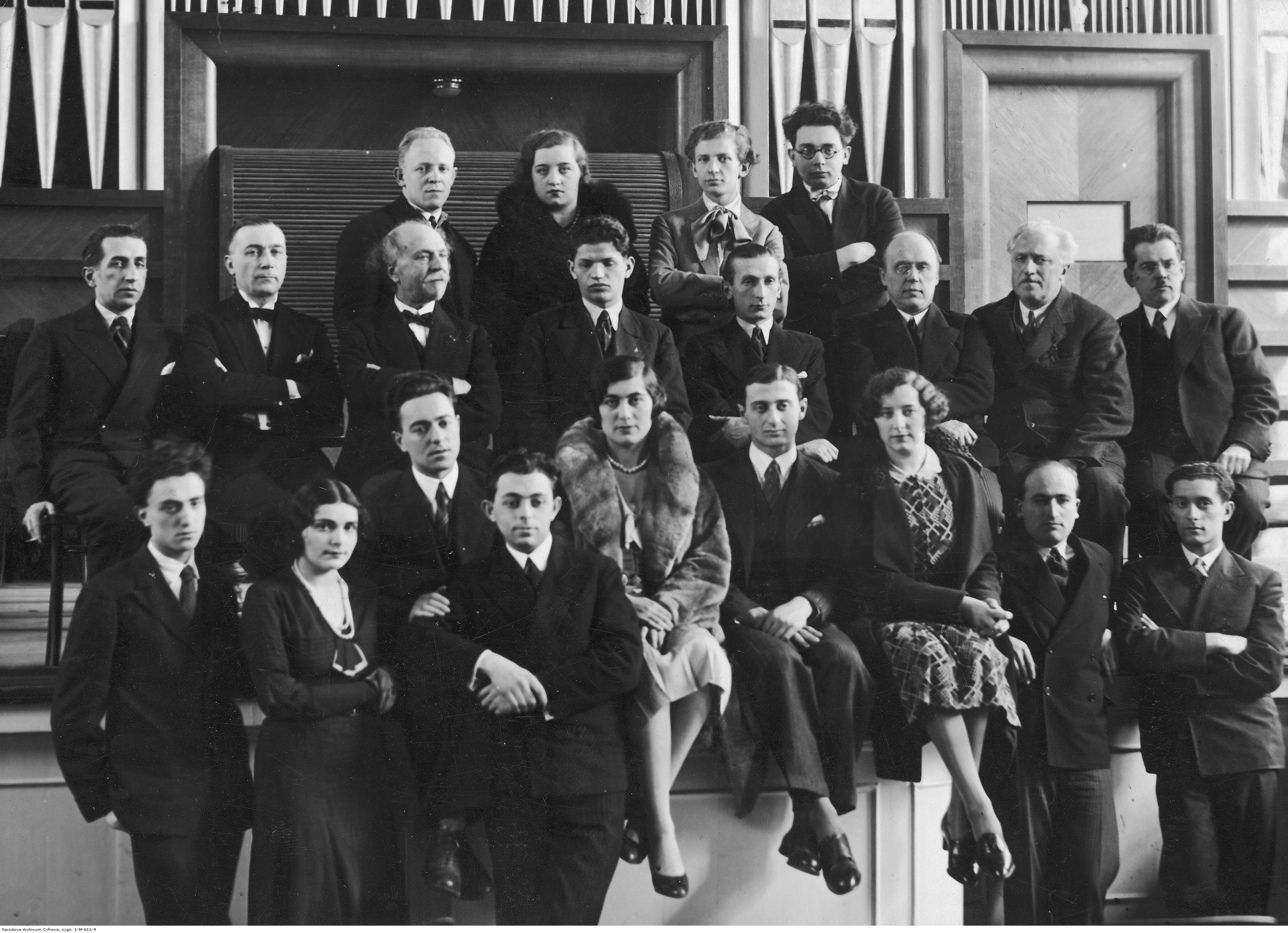
Boruński (1st row; 4th from right) with jurors and laureates of the 2nd Chopin Competition in Warsaw

=== Revue theatre and composition ===
Throughout the 1930s, Boruński was a prominent pianist in Warsaw's revue theatre circuit. He performed at several of the city's most popular venues, including Wielka Rewia, Cyrulik Warszawski (the Warsaw Barber), Morskie Oko, Qui Pro Quo, and Stara Banda. For a number of years, he served as an accompanist for the singer and actress Hanka Ordonówna, one of the leading stars of the Polish interwar cabaret. Beginning in 1929, he played with Henry Vars in revues as a regular duo called "Jazz for Two Pianos." From 1936 until the invasion of Poland in September 1939, he formed a regular piano accompanist duo with Karol Gimpel at the Cyrulik Warszawski theatre, as documented in surviving theatre programs.

Boruński was also active as a composer. His works included piano concertos, songs for voice and piano, and piano miniatures, as well as a Children's Symphony. He also composed illustrative, popular, and Jazz music for the Warsaw revue theatres. Most of his compositions were lost during the war.

== World War II and death ==
Following the invasion of Poland in September 1939, Boruński moved eastward. In the autumn of that year, he became the music director of the Miniature Theatre in Białystok, then under Soviet occupation. In May 1940, he performed at the Kazimierz Krukowski Theatre, and subsequently joined the jazz orchestra of Adi Rosner, with which he toured the Soviet Union, performing in Moscow, Leningrad, Kiev, Odessa, Sevastopol, and Sochi, among other cities.

In the autumn of 1940, Boruński returned to Białystok and then to Warsaw, where he was confined in the Warsaw Ghetto. He performed at the café Pod 13tką ("Under the 13") on Leszno Street, one of the ghetto's active musical venues.

In 1942, suffering from a pulmonary illness, he was admitted to a sanatorium in Otwock, a town near Warsaw with a significant Jewish community. After contracting tuberculosis, Boruński lived in poverty in the Otwock Ghetto and was the beneficiary of a charity concert in Warsaw in July 1942 by Władysław Szpilman and Adolf Goldfelder. Later that month, German forces killed all patients and residents of the sanatorium during the liquidation of the Otwock ghetto. Boruński was killed there, aged 32. The broader liquidation of the Otwock ghetto on August 19, 1942, resulted in the murder or deportation of thousands of Jews to the Treblinka extermination camp.
