= Lily Herz =

Hungarian pianist (1909–1970)

- Herz in 1932

Background information
- Born: Lili Herz c. 1909
- Died: June 1970 (aged 60 or 61)
- Education: Franz Liszt Academy of Music
- Occupations: Pianist; piano teacher

Lili Herz (anglicized as Lily; c. 1909 – June 1970) (Note: Hungarian music magazine Képes Családi Lapok published a one-page feature on Lili Herz in the summer of 1941, when she was 32 years of age, yielding a birth year of late 1908 or early 1909.) was a Hungarian pianist and répétiteur. Trained at the Franz Liszt Academy of Music in Budapest, she made her solo debut at the Vienna Konzerthaus in 1926 and performed regularly in Hungary and on Hungarian radio through the early 1930s. In 1932, she won a prize at the second International Chopin Piano Competition in Warsaw, representing Hungary, and was afterwards invited to give concerts across Europe.

Herz came from a Hungarian Jewish family, and her concert opportunities declined after the outbreak of World War II. She continued to perform with Artists' Action, a group for Jewish musicians and artists deprived of work, until the German invasion of Hungary in March 1944. After the war, she appeared on radio and worked as a répétiteur with the Postal Workers' Music Ensemble in Hungary.

== Biography ==
Born in Hungary in late 1908 or 1909 to a family of Ashkenazi Jews, her mother was a trained musician and singer. Herz passed numerus clausus to attend the Academy of Music in Budapest, and performed a concert in 1925 for impoverished Jewish students. She made her solo debut in Vienna with a program of Frédéric Chopin's Scherzo No. 3 and Maurice Ravel's Jeux d'eau at the Vienna Konzerthaus on February 15, 1926, with additional pieces by Hungarian composers Sándor Reschofsky and Adolf Schulz-Evler. She continued to perform monthly through the latter half of the 1920s, including Hungarian music by Zoltán Kodály and Béla Bartók. Regarding her playing, a Hungarian music magazine wrote:

“We can list three advantages of the pianist Lili Herz, who gave a solo concert today at the Academy of Music: her light, elegant, and secure hand technique; her solid musicality, which also shows in her correct pedaling; and her calm manner of playing.”

— Magyar Hírlap, January 1927

Newspapers in Hungary reported that Herz gave concerts in Hungarian towns lost under the Treaty of Trianon (so-called "severed cities") in 1928. She also performed at The Hague and for Hungarian radio stations, and concertized regularly in the early 1930s. A critic commented that:

“What strikes the listener first of all in [her] piano playing is the lightness, harmony, and natural charm of her artistic expression. This artist communicates her message with shapeliness and unselfconscious fluency…”

— Pesti Napló, February 1931

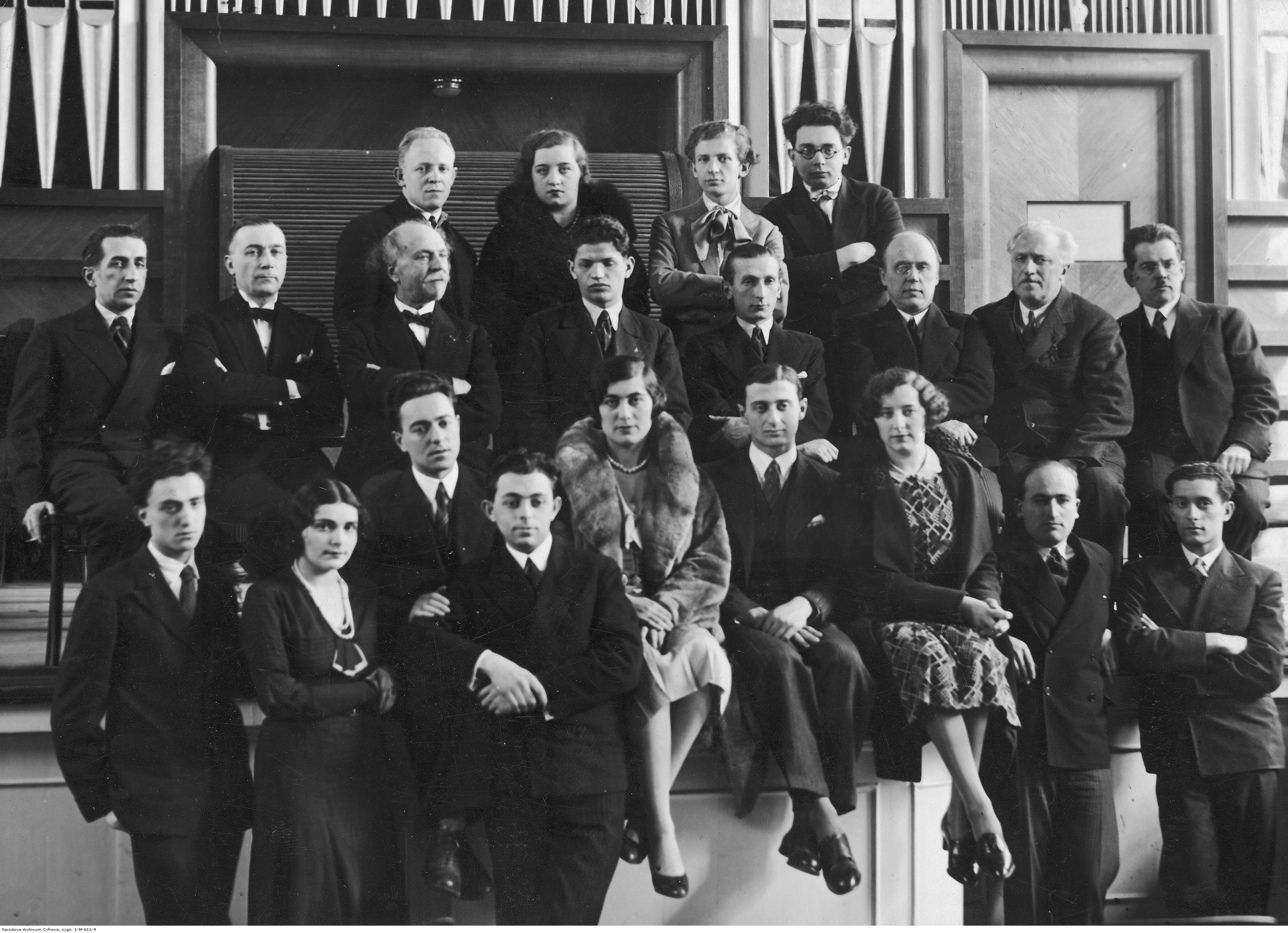
Herz (bottom row, 5th from left) with competitors and jurors of the Chopin competition in Warsaw (1932)

In 1932, she competed in the second edition of the International Chopin Piano Competition in Warsaw, taking fourteenth prize. Herz represented Hungary along with Louis Kentner, Julian von Károlyi, and Imre Ungár. Regarding the competition, jurist Jerzy Żurawlew said that "most of all, I remember the beautiful Lili Herz", whom he assisted since she spoke French. He also wrote that the chairman of the competition, Adam Wieniawski, was "enchanted by her from the very first day", so that she was assigned a practice room with the "finest piano". Afterwards, she was invited to perform concerts across Poland, Berlin, Rome, and Zurich before returning to perform in Szeged and Subcarpathia.

After the outbreak of World War II in 1939, her concert opportunities began to slow, although she performed at the Goldmark Hall in Budapest with opera soprano Irén Zoltán in December 1939, appeared several times with actor Imre Ráday, and played with opera singers Dezső Ernster, Pál Győri, and Andor Lendvai. Her final concert with Artists' Action, a group established for Jewish musicians and artists deprived of performance opportunities and livelihood, was in February 1944 with the violinist Sándor Fejér shortly before the German invasion of Hungary.

After the war, she appeared on radio programs and became a répétiteur, or rehearsal pianist, with the Postal Workers' Music Ensembles (Postás Zenei Együttesek). One of her final performances was with a women's group of the Hegedűs Gyula Street synagogue as an accompanist in 1965.

She died in June 1970, aged 60 or 61.
