= II International Chopin Piano Competition =

Piano competition in Warsaw (1932)

The Second International Fryderyk Chopin Piano Competition
- Poster by Stanisław Ostoja-Chrostowski
- Date: 6–23 March 1932
- Venue: Warsaw Philharmonic, Warsaw
- Hosted by: Warsaw Music Society
- Winner: Alexander Uninsky (stateless)

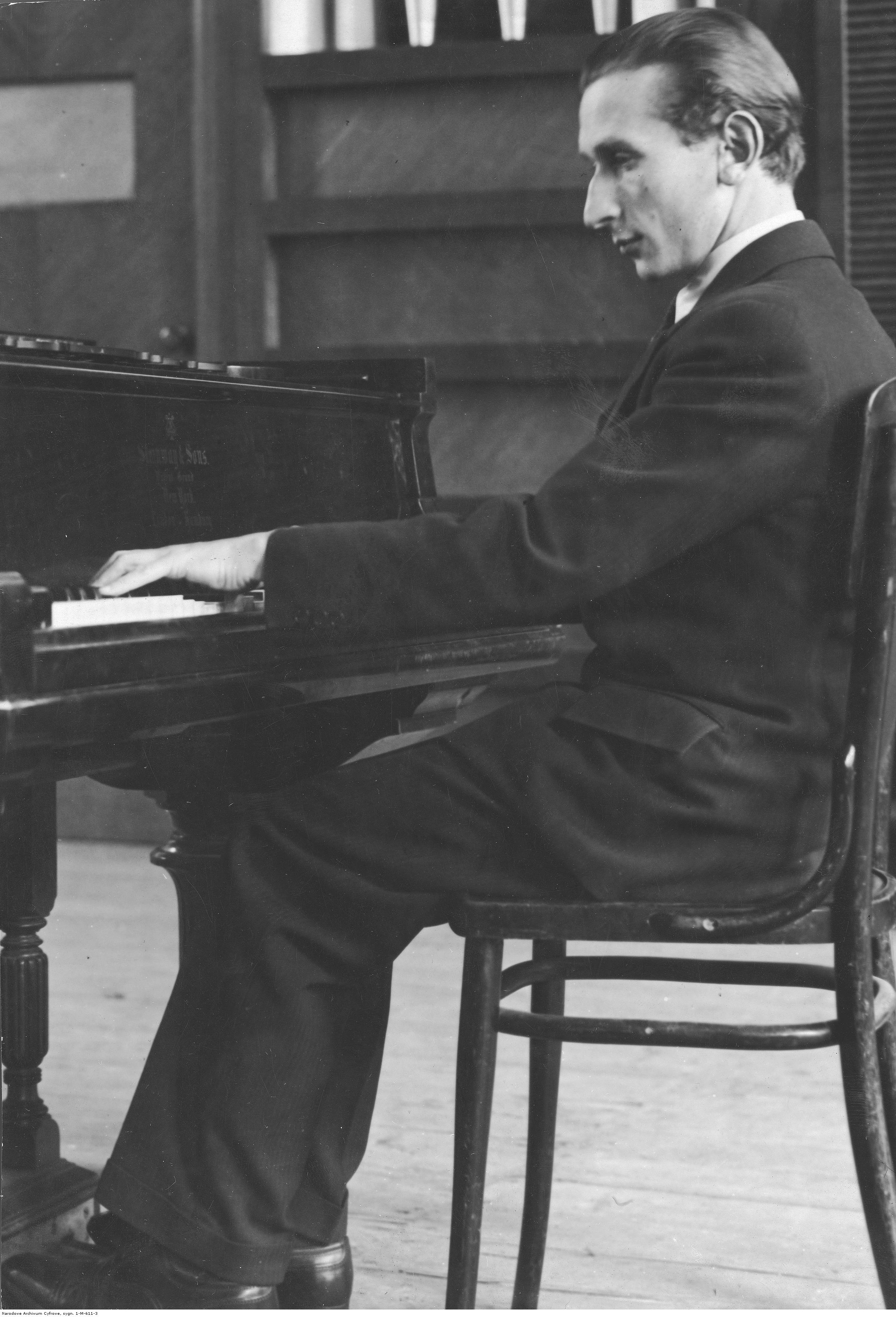
Alexander Uninsky, winner of the first prize

The II International Chopin Piano Competition (Polish: II Międzynarodowy Konkurs Pianistyczny im. Fryderyka Chopina) was held from 6 to 23 March 1932 at the Warsaw Philharmonic in Warsaw, five years after the first edition. It was organized by the Warsaw Music Society and drew great public interest and correspondents from around the world, partly because of its prominent international jury. The guest of honor was Maurice Ravel, who conducted a concert of his own works on 11 March.

Alexander Uninsky, a stateless Russian émigré pianist based in Paris, was awarded first prize. The Hungarian pianist Imre Ungár, who was blind, had finished level with him on points and refused to accept a shared first prize, so the order was settled by drawing lots, which Uninsky won.

== Background ==
The competition was conceived by the pianist and pedagogue Jerzy Żurawlew, who wanted to promote the performance of Chopin's music by adding an element of sporting rivalry to it, and who insisted that such an event had to be international. After the first competition in 1927, the second was held after the five-year interval the organizers had originally planned.

== Organization ==
The competition's organizing committee was headed by Prince Włodzimierz Czetwertyński, president of the Warsaw Music Society, with Adam Chromiński as secretary. Its members included the composers Karol Szymanowski, Witold Maliszewski, and Eugeniusz Morawski-Dąbrowa, the pianists Zbigniew Drzewiecki, Józef Turczyński, and Jerzy Żurawlew, and the critic Stefan Natanson. An honorary committee drew on the Polish government: Prime Minister Aleksander Prystor, Foreign Minister August Zaleski, the Minister of Religious Denominations and Public Education Janusz Jędrzejewicz, and the Minister of Communications Alfons Kühn.

The 1932 poster was designed by Stanisław Ostoja-Chrostowski, who used a traditional layout, with the dates at the sides, a block of text at the bottom, and Chopin's profile and medallion at the top, highlighted with white paint.

=== Rules and repertoire ===
Entrants were scored by the jury on a scale from 0 to 15 points. The competition had two stages, an elimination round and a final. Eight, and after the jury's deliberations fourteen, of the highest-scoring competitors were admitted to the final, where they played Chopin's piano concertos with orchestra. Points from the final were added to those already earned, and prizes were awarded in order of total points. If competitors finished with equal totals, the order of prizes was decided by drawing lots among those concerned, a rule that was applied several times during the competition.

The 1932 edition added several works to the required repertoire for the first time, among them the Polonaise in A-flat major, Op. 53, the scherzos, the Fantaisie in F minor, and the piano sonatas. The event also began the tradition of accompanying exhibitions, with documents and memorabilia relating to Chopin being shown in the newly built National Museum in Warsaw.

=== Participants ===
Accounts of the number of participants differ. The Chopin Institute states that 89 pianists from 18 countries arrived in Warsaw, while the contemporary daily Ilustrowany Kuryer Codzienny counted 67 pianists from 14 countries who played in the elimination round, two of them without declared nationality, with Poland and the Soviet Union sending the largest contingents. The Chopin Institute also describes the 1932 edition as attracting over 200 pianists, a figure that likely refers to applicants.

== Competition ==
The opening ceremony took place on 6 March at the Warsaw Philharmonic and was attended by the President of Poland, Ignacy Mościcki, and members of the diplomatic corps. Prince Czetwertyński welcomed the audience in Polish and then in French, after which the director of the Warsaw Music Society, Adam Tadeusz Wieniawski, introduced the performers. The ceremony was broadcast by Polskie Radio.

Elimination auditions began around 12:30 on 6 March and continued until 20 March, in one or two daily sessions. The first to play was the Polish pianist Njura Krasnosielska; the last was the Italian Renato Cohen.

=== Ravel's visit ===
On 11 March, during the elimination round, Maurice Ravel, the guest of honor, conducted a concert of his works with the Warsaw Philharmonic orchestra, consisting of his Piano Concerto in G major and La valse. The soloist in the concerto was Marguerite Long, to whom the work is dedicated and who had given its premiere under Ravel's baton in January 1932; she was also a member of the competition jury. Ravel and Szymanowski attended the auditions as guests at the jury table. (Note: Podczas przesłuchań był gościem przy stole sędziowskim ("During the auditions he was a guest at the judges' table"), as noted in the Polish article.)

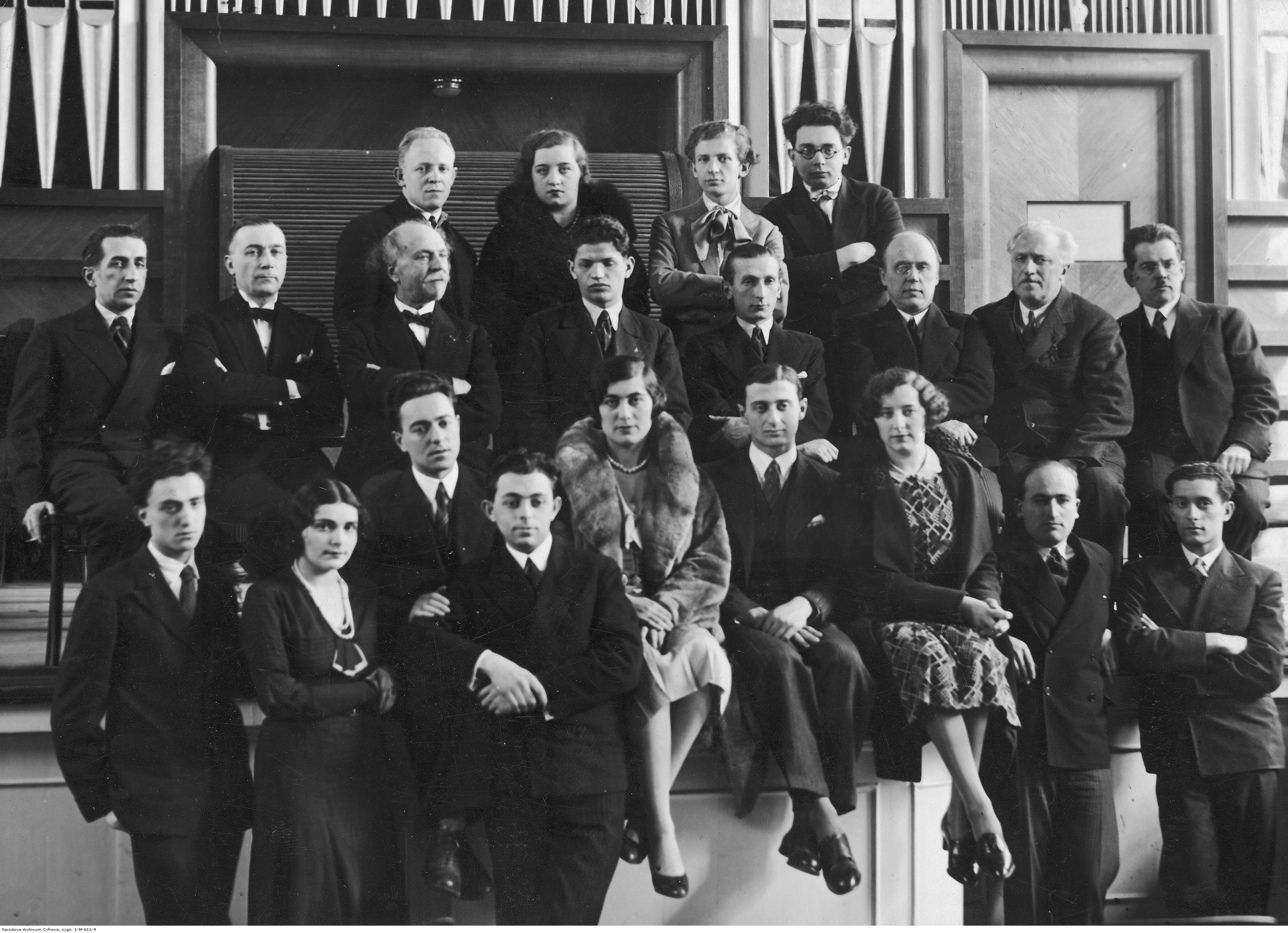
Jurors and laureates of the competition posing for a photograph

=== Final round ===
On 21 March, after the last elimination performance, the jury deliberated in full at the Warsaw Music Society's premises from 11:00 to 20:00 to select the finalists. Julian von Károlyi of Hungary and Suzanne de Mayère of Belgium received the same number of points for the last place in the final, and under the rules lots were drawn, which fell to Károlyi. Fourteen pianists went through to the final, which was held on 22 and 23 March. Each performed from memory two consecutive movements (either the first and second, or the second and third) of Concerto in E minor, Op. 11 or Concerto in F minor, Op. 21, accompanied by the Warsaw Philharmonic orchestra under Ignacy Neumark, Józef Ozimiński, and Kazimierz Wiłkomirski.

Ungár was the last finalist to play, on 23 March. A report in Express Poranny describes the audience as deeply moved by his performance of the E minor concerto, during which one listener fainted; after prolonged applause the jury made the unusual concession of letting him play a solo piece, though he asked not to be pressed for encores because he was tired.

In a poll held during the competition, audiences and participants chose the best and most popular piano among the instruments the young pianists had played; the winner was a Bösendorfer from Vienna.

== Results ==
After the last finalist had played, the jury announced the final results and the allocation of prizes at about 1 a.m. (Note: The Polish article gives "23 marca w nocy około godziny 1" ("on the night of 23 March at about 1 a.m.") citing Ilustrowany Kuryer Codzienny, 25 March 1932, so this probably refers to the night of 23–24 March; check against the source.)

=== Tie for first place ===
Uninsky and Ungár each finished with 345 points. When the jury proposed that the two share first prize, Ungár protested, and the matter was decided by drawing lots, an unprecedented event in the competition's history. Uninsky was awarded first prize and Ungár second. The same procedure was applied to Bolesław Kon and Abram Lufer, who both scored 325 points and were placed third and fourth respectively. Uninsky also won the special prize for the best performance of mazurkas, awarded by Polskie Radio.

=== Prizes ===
Prize		Laureate		Donor
1st	5,000zł	Alexander Uninsky (Note: Placing decided by drawing lots after a tie on points.)	Stateless	President of Poland
2nd	3,000zł	Imre Ungár	Hungary	Ministry of Religious Denominations and Public Education
3rd	2,000zł	Bolesław Kon	Poland	Mayor of Warsaw
4th	2,000zł	Abram Lufer	Soviet Union	Warsaw Music Society
5th	1,500zł	Lajos Kentner	Hungary	Polish–Japanese Music Society, Tokyo
6th	1,000zł	Leonid Sagalov	Soviet Union	Fryderyk Chopin School of Music, Warsaw
7th	1,000zł	Leon Boruński	Poland	Audience
8th	1,000zł	Teodor Gutman	Soviet Union	Anonymous
9th	500zł	Julian von Károlyi	Hungary	Bolesław Rudzki gramophone company
10th	400zł	Kurt Engel	Austria	Henryk Markiewicz concert agency
11th	400zł	Emanuel Grossman	Soviet Union	Feliks Grąbczewski music publishers
12th	400zł	Josef Wagner	Germany	Józef Śliwiński Prize
13th	300zł	Maryla Jonasówna	Poland	A group of Chopin admirers
14th	300zł	Lily Herz	Hungary	Audience
15th	300zł	Suzanne de Mayère	Belgium	Audience
HM		Abram Djakow	Soviet Union	
HM		Maria Dońska	Poland	
HM		Olga Iliwicka	Poland	
HM		Aleksandr Jocheles	Soviet Union	
HM		Aleksander Kagan	Poland	
HM		Maria Novik	Latvia	
HM		Wiera Razumowskaja	Soviet Union	
HM		Aleksander Sienkiewicz	Poland	
HM		Pawieł Sieriebriakow	Soviet Union	
HM		Carlo Vidusso	Italy	

One special prize was awarded:

Special prize	Winner		Donor
Best Performance of Mazurkas	Alexander Uninsky	Stateless	Polskie Radio

== Jury ==
The jury of 22 was chaired by Adam Tadeusz Wieniawski, with Stanisław Niewiadomski as vice-chairman and Eugeniusz Morawski-Dąbrowa as secretary. (Note: The Polish article lists Franciszek Brzeziński, Marian Dąbrowski, and Roman Jasiński as substitutes for absent jurors. Marguerite Long judged the pianists only on the fourth day of the auditions, and Ravel and Szymanowski attended as guests at the jury table.)

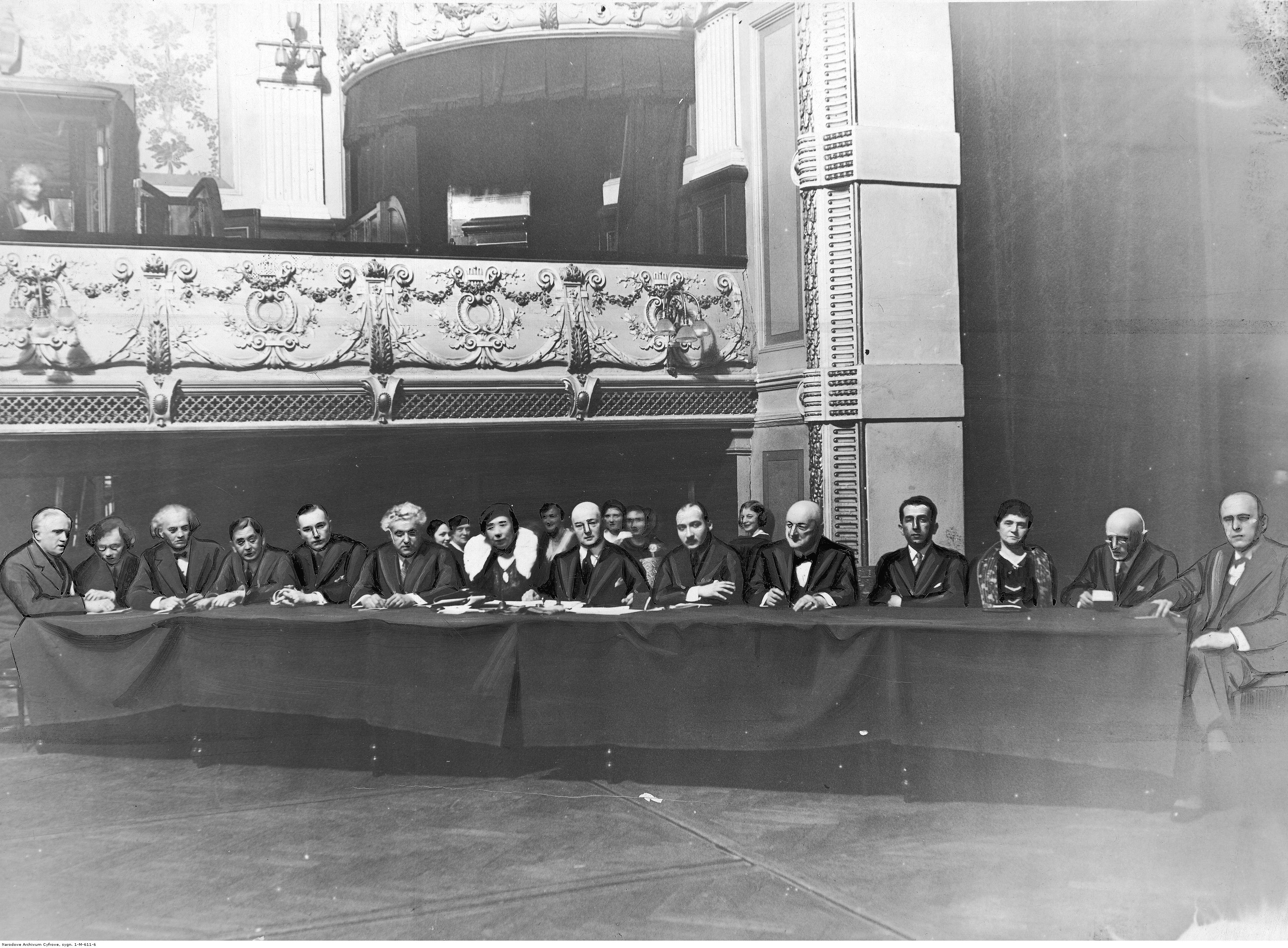
The competition jury

- (Poland) Franciszek Brzeziński (substitute)
- (Poland) Marian Dąbrowski (substitute)
- (Poland) Zbigniew Drzewiecki
- (Belgium) Arthur De Greef
- (Germany) Alfred Hoehn
- (Poland) Roman Jasiński (substitute)
- (Poland) Juliusz Kaden-Bandrowski
- (France) Marguerite Long
- (Austria) Joseph Marx
- (Poland) Eugeniusz Morawski-Dąbrowa (secretary)
- (Poland) Stanisław Niewiadomski (vice-chairman)
- (Poland) Zofia Rabcewicz
- (France) Maurice Ravel (guest of honor)
- (Germany) Richard Rössler
- (Poland) Karol Szymanowski
- (Poland) Józef Śmidowicz
- (Brazil) Magda Tagliaferro
- (Poland) Józef Turczyński
- (Austria) Paul Weingarten
- (Poland) Adam Wieniawski (chairman)
- (Italy) Carlo Zecchi
- (Poland) Jerzy Żurawlew

== Aftermath ==
Ungár's performance, and the drawing of lots that decided the first two places, were among the most widely reported aspects of the competition. The New York Times reported the result on 25 March 1932, describing the 23-year-old blind Hungarian and the 24-year-old Russian émigré as the two first-prize winners. Ungár went on to perform with European orchestras under conductors including Otto Klemperer, Dimitri Mitropoulos, and Willem Mengelberg, and after the Second World War taught at the Franz Liszt Academy of Music in Budapest. He later returned to the Chopin Competition as a member of the jury in the 1950s, as did the earlier winners Lev Oborin and Yakov Zak.
