= Carlo Vidusso =

Italian pianist (1911–1978)

Carlo Vidusso (1911 in Talcahuano – 1978 in Milan) was an Italian pianist.

He studied piano with Ernesto Drangosch and at 9 years old got a diploma in Buenos Aires. He moved to Italy, studied composition with Giulio Cesare Paribeni and Renzo Bossi at the Conservatorio of Milano and continued his piano studies with Carlo Lonati. He received an honorable mention at the II International Chopin Piano Competition.

A virtuoso with ease of reading, at 20 years old he began an acclaimed concert career, performing in Italy and around Europe. In 1953, owing to a disorder in his right hand, he stopped performing in public and thence dedicated himself to teaching. Maurizio Pollini was among his many students.

He fingered and revised many piano compositions.
