= Bolesław Kon =

Polish pianist

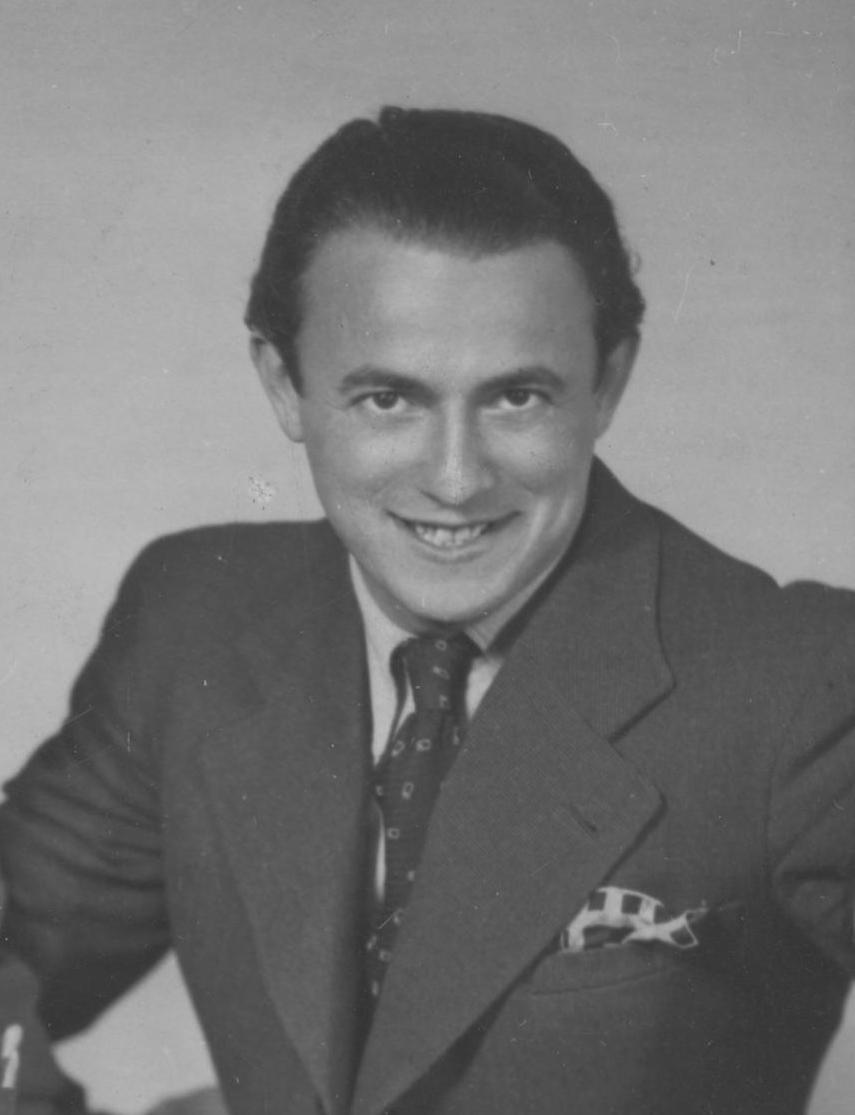
A portrait of Bolesław Kon

Bolesław Kon (9 December 1906 – 10 June 1936) was a Polish concert pianist who won international acclaim in his brief career.

Kon was born into a poor Jewish family in Warsaw. He began his piano training aged about 10, at the Moscow Conservatory under Konstantin Igumnov. In 1924, he returned to Poland and continued his studies, first at the Chopin Higher Academy, and then at the Warsaw Conservatory under Aleksander Michałowski and afterwards under Juliusz Wertheim and Zbigniew Drzewiecki. Even as a student, he showed extraordinary powers, and a front-rank career was anticipated for him.

After graduation, he moved to Kraków as professor of piano at the Music Society Conservatory there, of which he became Director in 1929–1931. By now, he was giving orchestral concerts in Warsaw and Kraków, and in 1932, at Drzewiecki's urging, he entered the II International Chopin Piano Competition and won the third prize - having tied with Abram Lufer, and he won at the coin flipping. In the following year, after a short period of preparation living in Vienna, he entered the second International Music Competition there and obtained the first prize. (This competition was marked by Alfred Cortot, a member of the jury, walking out because the first prize had been awarded to Kon and not to Dinu Lipatti, who took second prize.) With these two prizes, Kon received many invitations to give concerts and started touring.

Tragically, Kon suffered from a form of existential depression. He was afflicted with a hereditary mental illness and attended a sanatorium at regular intervals. The need to continue his career caused him to cut short a period of treatment, and it was in this way that the fatal melancholy overtook him. Kon committed suicide in Warsaw in June 1936.

According to Professor Drzewiecki, Kon was the greatest pianistic genius that he ever heard; Mme Margerita Trombini-Kazuro described his playing as of great nobility and spontaneity. It is believed that he made no recordings, a factor that has been cited for his having "faded into oblivion" in the public consciousness after his death.

== Sources ==
- J. Methuen-Campbell, Chopin Playing From The Composer To The Present Day (Gollancz, London 1981).
- Fryderyk Chopin Institute, Website.
- Vienna's Music Contests 1933 → " Musical Courier July 15, 1933. → http://blog.livedoor.jp/bookshell/archives/1286524.html
