= María Ángeles Ferrer Forés =

María Ángeles Ferrer Forés is a Spanish music education pedagogue and musicologist, awarded the Premio Acción Magistral (Master Action Prize) 2010 by UNESCO, as best professor of Spain. Her books, discs, and interactive software for young students and teachers are published in Spain by Pearson Education (27 books and 18 CD in 2010, 2009) and Oxford University Press (9 books and 8 CD in 2005, 2004, 2003). She is member of the organization and Jury in Ibiza International Piano Competition.

== Studies and professional activity ==
Born in Palma de Majorca, Spain, she has the Musicology PhD awarded by the University of Salamanca (2005). She made her postgraduate academic degree at University of Salamanca and University of London, Royal Holloway College (1996–1998). She has the Musicology Degree (1996) and History of Art Degree (1996) at University of Salamanca. She also has the Master's Degrees of piano (1992), singing (2000), music composition (2000) and music theory (2001), with the highest qualifications, at the Balearic Islands, Salamanca and Seville Conservatories of Music. She is Music Teacher in Secondary Education at Madrid (1998–current), Didactic of Music Associated professor at University of Valladolid (2008–2012), Didactic of Music Associated professor at Universidad Internacional de La Rioja UNIR (2012–current) and Didactic of Music Associated professor at Universidad a distancia de Madrid UDIMA (2012–current).

== Prizes and grants ==
Ferrer Forés has won the following prizes and grants:

- 1987: First Prize I Ibiza International Piano Competition (Spain)
- 1990: "Aventura 92" Sociedad Estatal Quinto Centenario Grant by Complutense University of Madrid (Spain, Mexico, Panama, Colombia, Puerto Rico and Portugal)
- 1994: Spanish Rotary Club Grant at Foreigners University of Siena (Italy)
- 1995: Collaboration Grant at University of Salamanca (Spain)
- 1996: Balearic Islands Government Grant (Spain)
- 1997: Pedagogic Course at Hungary Grant by Foreign Office (Hungary)
- 1997: Iberoamerican Professionals Grant by Ministry of Culture (Spain)
- 1997: Erasmus Grant at University of London (United Kingdom)
- 1998: Fundación Empresa Pública Grant (Spain)
- 1999: First Prize Curricular Resources for Professors Seville Town Hall (Spain)
- 2006: Second Prize XIX Young Researchers National Competition by Ministry of Work (Spain)
- 2006: representative of Spain at III Latinoamerican Expo Science at Veracruz (Mexico)
- 2007: Second Prize, Third Prize and Special Jury Prize VIII Young Barcelona Expo Research (Spain)
- 2007: representative of Spain at XXI European Youth Expo Science at Brussels (Belgium)
- 2007: First Prize IV National Competition for Young Scientific Writers (Spain)
- 2007: Special Prize for Creativity XIII San Viator Research Prize in Humanities (Spain)
- 2008: Special Mention "Defense of Youth" by Community of Madrid given by Letizia, Princess of Asturias, Spain at National Auditorium of Music, Madrid (Spain)
- 2008: Second Prize XXI National Prize Don John Bosco (Spain)
- 2008: Second Prize IV National Competition for Young Scientific Writers (Spain)
- 2008: Special Prize for Creativity XIV San Viator Research Prize in Humanities (Spain)

== Books ==
She wrote the music collection "Hit the note" (Dando la nota) published by Pearson Education (27 books and 18 CD in 2010, 2009). This collection, for music students and teachers in Spanish and English, published also in the Catala, and Valencian languages. Another work is "Música. Proyecto Exedra" (Music. Exedra Project) published by Oxford University Press (9 books and 8 CD in 2005, 2004, 2003). She also wrote Tosca by Giacomo Puccini published by University of Salamanca (2007) and more than 100 articles in magazines, books, and notes for concerts and recitals.

== Singer and pianist ==
She gave recitals as singer and pianist at festivals including "Classics of XXIst Century" at Juan March Institute, Ibiza International Music Festival, Mozart Festival with the Balearics Symphony Orchestra at Auditorium of Palma de Majorca, Contemporary Scene Festival Círculo de Bellas Artes at Madrid, Salamanca Contemporary Music International Festival, Seville Opera Festival, Cordoba Sensxperiment Festival, Valencia Nits d’Art d’Aielo, Alcalá de Henares Cathedral International Organ Festival, Siena Accademia dei Rozzi (Italy), Würzburg Residence (Germany), Esztergom Summer University Festival (Hungary). Since 1985 and every Christmas Eve Mass she performed El Cant de la Sibil·la (The Song of the Sibyl, UNESCO World Heritage Site) at Sant James church in Palma de Majorca (Spain).

== Membership and investigation groups ==
She is a member of Sociedad General de Autores y Editores (SGAE, General Association for Authors and Publishers), Asociación Colegial de Escritores de España (ACE, Professional Association of Spanish Writers), CEDRO (Spanish Association for Copyright) and, since 1987, of the organization of Ibiza International Piano Competition (President of Honour Princess Irene of Greece and Denmark). She was a member of research groups: “System of management of the learning in platforms VLE” (“Sistema de gestión del aprendizaje en plataformas VLE”) (University of Valladolid), in the INNPACTO program sponsored by the Spanish Ministry of Science and Innovation (2010–2012); "Festival of the Knowledge" ("Festival del Conocimiento") inside ARCE program sponsored by Spanish Ministry of Education (2010–2011) and "Music and philosophy. The interdisciplinary nature of the postvanguard" ("Música y filosofía. La interdisciplinariedad de la postvanguardia") inside the Teachers Resources Program of Seville sponsored by Andalusia Government, Spain (1999–2001).
