= Franciszek Brzeziński =

Polish composer and music critic (1867–1944)

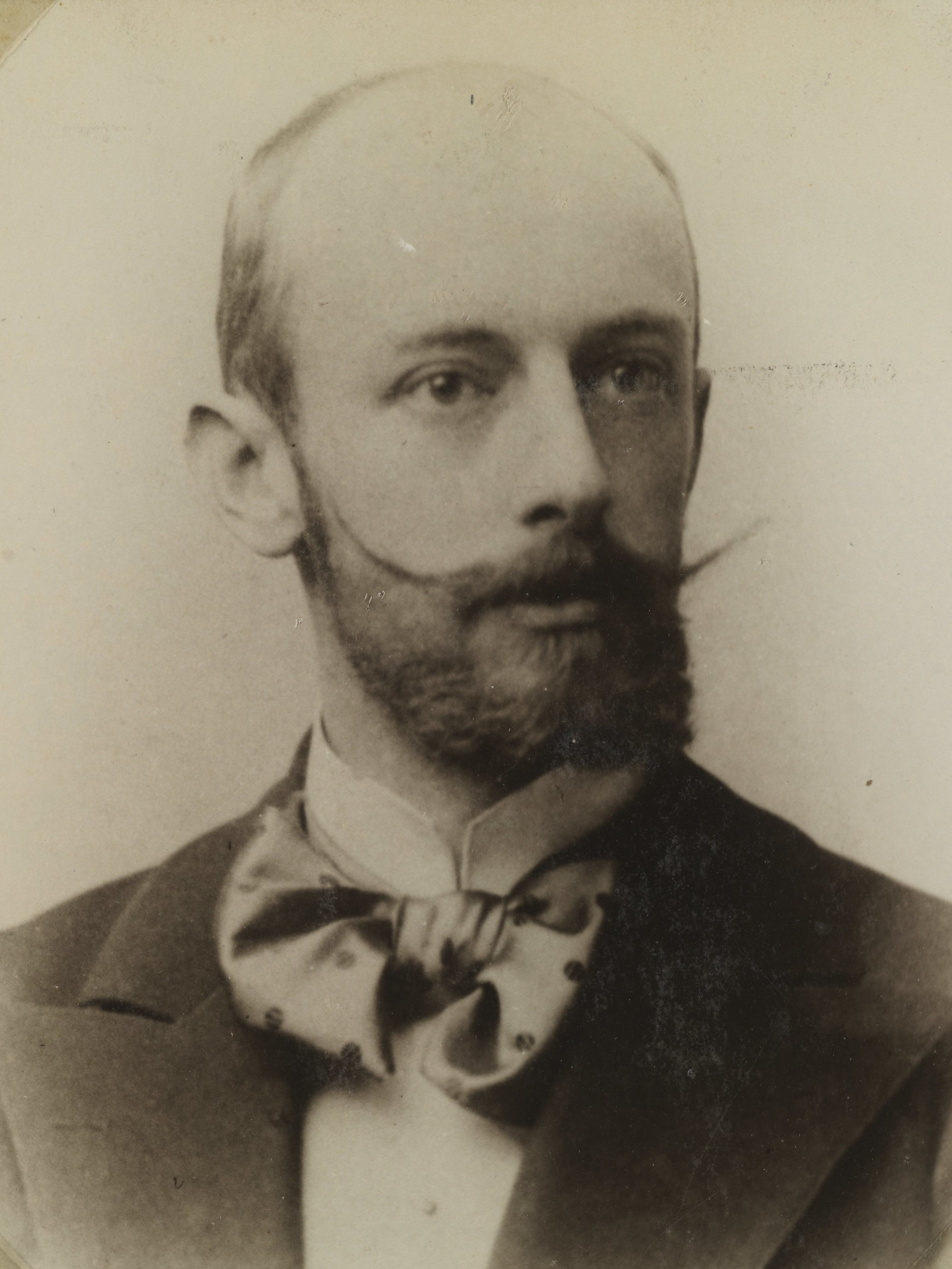
- Portrait in 1900

Background information
- Born: Franciszek Ksawery Brzeziński; September 6, 1867; Warsaw, Congress Poland, Russian Empire
- Died: August 6, 1944 (aged 76) Warsaw, German-occupied Poland
- Education: Leipzig Conservatory
- Occupations: Composer; music critic; lawyer; consular official
- Years active: 1890–1944

Franciszek Ksawery Brzeziński (Polish pronunciation: [bʐɛˈʑij̃skʲi]; fran-CHEE-shek ksa-VEH-rih bzeh-ZHEEN-skee; September 6, 1867 (Note: Most reference works, including MGG and the Leipziger Biographie, give September 6, 1867. The student records of the Leipzig Conservatory, followed by IMSLP and the Digital Library of Polish Song, give November 6, 1867.) – August 6, 1944) was a Polish composer, music critic, lawyer, and consular official. He trained first in law and musicology before turning to music full-time in 1903, and studied composition at the Leipzig Conservatory under Max Reger and Stephan Krehl.

He abandoned composition after the First World War and became a widely published critic in interwar Warsaw, while also serving as consul of the Second Polish Republic in Breslau and Berlin. His small surviving output, mostly for piano, belongs to the late Romantic tradition.

== Biography ==
=== Early life and education ===
Brzeziński was born in 1867 in Warsaw, the capital of Congress Poland in the Russian Empire, the son of Walentyna (née Suchorzewska) and Kazimierz Brzeziński. He was a grandson of the pianist and composer Filipina Brzezińska-Szymanowska, through whom the family was connected by marriage to Maria Szymanowska. He took his first piano lessons in Warsaw with the composer Jan Kleczyński.

He studied law in Dresden and at the Imperial University of Dorpat, graduating in 1890, and then studied musicology at Leipzig from 1893 to 1896 under Hugo Riemann and Arnold Schering. He practiced as a lawyer in Warsaw until 1903 while continuing to study music privately. Afterwards, he devoted himself entirely to music, spending a year in Paris before enrolling at the Royal Conservatory in Leipzig from 1904 to 1907, where he studied composition with Max Reger and Stephan Krehl,and conducting with Arthur Nikisch. In the 1907–08 season, he was second conductor at the municipal opera in Elberfeld.

=== Composition and criticism ===
Almost all of Brzeziński's published music dates from the decade after his Leipzig studies. The Stimmungsbilder in Variationenform, Op. 3, appeared from Bote & Bock in Berlin and the Suita polska (Polish Suite), Op. 4, from Lauterbach & Kühn in Leipzig; the three preludes and fugues of the Tryptyk, Op. 5, were issued jointly by A. Piwarski of Kraków and Gebethner & Wolff of Warsaw in 1911, and the Toccata in F major, Op. 7, by Piwarski in 1912. His Sonata in D major for violin and piano, Op. 6, was published by J. Rieter-Biedermann in Leipzig and reviewed in the Warsaw press in 1916. A Piano Concerto in G minor, Op. 9, written in 1914–15, was performed by Zbigniew Drzewiecki in November 1918; its manuscript is generally reported lost during the Second World War and was never recovered in later searches.

Brzeziński gave up composition after the First World War and worked mainly as a critic, writing the music column of Kurier Warszawski between 1916 and 1921 and teaching the history of opera at the Warsaw Conservatory. He later contributed to Nowiny Muzyczne i Teatralne, Rzeczpospolita, Sztuka, Muzyka, Muzyka Polska, and Świat, and in 1929 was admitted to the association of Polish music writers and critics. He sat as a substitute member of the jury of the II International Chopin Piano Competition in Warsaw in 1932. His monograph on Bedřich Smetana was published in Warsaw in 1933 and remained the work for which he was best known in his lifetime.

=== Consular service and later life ===
From 1921 to 1927 Brzeziński served as consul of the Republic of Poland in Breslau, and afterward briefly in Berlin, where around 1928 he acted as correspondent for the Warsaw monthly Muzyka. He returned to Poland in 1931.

Brzeziński died in Warsaw on August 6, 1944, during the opening week of the Warsaw Uprising. He was buried in the family grave at Powązki Cemetery.

== Music ==
Brzeziński's music is rooted in the late nineteenth-century tradition—he particularly admired Brahms—though he was not hostile to modernism; his critical writings are considered a source for the study of Polish musical life of the period. Reviewing the first recordings of his surviving works, the critic Byzantion described the Tryptyk as a set of preludes and fugues paying homage to Bach, and found in the Tema con variazioni and the Suita polska a preference for conservative forms combined with a feeling for lyrical nostalgia and native dance rhythms, comparing the effect to that of Sergei Bortkiewicz. The same review judged the violin sonata his strongest work, singling out the expressive weight of its central slow movement.

The musicologist Maryla Renat included the Sonata in D major among the twentieth-century Polish violin sonatas in which native folklore is absorbed into the musical language, grouping it with what she termed the current of "forgotten Polish music."

== Selected works ==
Unless otherwise noted, dates are those of publication.

- Śpiewnik studencki (Student songbook), for voice and piano (c. 1890)
- Waltz, for piano (c. 1901); also orchestrated as Konzertwalzer
- Kołysanka and Serenada-Matinata, songs to the composer's own texts, for voice and piano (1904)
- Stimmungsbilder in Variationenform (Tema con variazioni), Op. 3, for piano
- Suita polska (Polish Suite) in G major, Op. 4, for piano (1908)
- Tryptyk (Triptique), three preludes and fugues, Op. 5, for piano (1911)
- Sonata in D major, Op. 6, for violin and piano
- Toccata in F major, Op. 7, for piano (1912)
- Piano Concerto in G minor, Op. 9 (1914–15; manuscript lost)
- Polonez-Ballada, for piano (1917); also in an orchestral version

== Writings ==
- Smetana. Warsaw: Księgarnia Muzyczna F. Grąbczewskiego, 1933.
- "O zadaniach krytyki muzycznej" [On the tasks of music criticism]. Muzyka Polska 2 (1935): 280–285.

Twenty-one of Brzeziński's articles were reprinted in Stefan Jarociński's anthology of Polish music criticism of the nineteenth and twentieth centuries (Kraków, 1955).

== Discography ==
- Complete Piano Works – Barbara Pakura (piano). Acte Préalable AP0267 (2013).
- Brzeziński – Szulc: Violin Sonatas – Irena Kalinowska-Grohs (violin), Barbara Pakura (piano). Acte Préalable AP0271 (2013).
