= Miriam Shomer Zunser =

American journalist

- Miriam Zunzer
- Born: Manya Shaikevitsch; November 25, 1882; Odessa, Ukraine
- Died: October 11, 1951 (aged 68); New York City
- Spouse: Charles Zunser
- Parent: Nokhem Mayer Shaikevitsch (father)
- Relatives: Anna Shomer Rothenberg (sister); Rose Shomer Bachelis (sister); Abraham Shomer (brother)

Miriam Shomer Zunser (November 25, 1882 – October 11, 1951) was an American journalist, playwright and artist. She was a significant promoter of Jewish culture prior to World War II.

== Life ==
Shomer was born Manya Shaikevitsch in Odessa, Russian Empire, to Nokhem Mayer Shaikevitsch, a novelist and playwright, and his wife Dinneh Bercinsky. Her family emigrated in 1889 to New York. She was known by her nickname, Minnie. After graduating high school she worked as a librarian while attending art classes taught by Henry McBride at the Educational Alliance.

In the 1920s, Zunser began writing Yiddish theater, sometimes cowriting with her sister Rose. As Yiddish theater lost popularity in the 1930s, Zunser began writing in English for the Broadway stage.

In 1932 Zunser was a co-founder and initial president of MAILAMM, the America-Palestine Institute of Musical Sciences (known by its Hebrew acronym), a society for the study and promotion of Jewish music in Palestine and the United States. Later, she was treasurer of the Jewish Music Forum. She organized a concert in Brooklyn played by pianist Kurt Engel and tenor Hans Heinz, raising US$202.

Having worked with Henrietta Szold, she was the founder of the Brooklyn chapter of Hadassah Women's Zionist Organization of America. She also was a delegate to the American Jewish Congress in 1917.

Zunser died in New York City.

== Personal ==
In 1905 she married Charles Zunser, son of the poet Eliakum Zunser. They had three children. Her sister was the Yiddish folksinger Anna Shomer Rothenberg.

== Publications ==
- The master of Thornfield; a play in 4 acts, built on the story of Jane Eyre. 192?. With Rose Shomer.
- Fortune's fool; a musical comedy in two acts and four scenes. New York: 192?
- A child's kingdom. New York: 192?
- Goldenlocks and the bears. New York: 192?
- Yesterday : a memoir of a Russian Jewish family. Published in 1939 by Stackpole Sons. Republished in 1978 by Harper & Row.
- Avinu Shomer (אבינו שמ״ר). Yerushalayim: Aḥiʼasaf, 1953.
