= Claudio Constantini =

Peruvian pianist

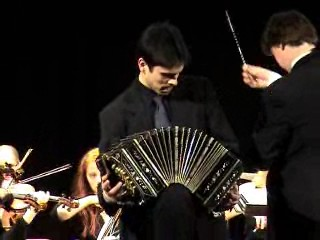
- Born: July 29, 1983 (age 43); Lima, Peru
- Occupation: Classical pianist
- Website: claudioconstantini.com

Claudio Constantini is a multiinstrumentalist (pianist, bandoneonist) and composer born in Peru and currently living in Spain. Known for his eclectic nature, he feels at home in a variety of musical genres. He has garnered one of the widest followings on social media for a classical instrumentalist.

== Biography ==
Claudio Constantini is a performer of two instruments, the piano and the bandoneón, as well as being a composer. Born and raised in Lima (Peru) into a musician's family, Constantini's unique style is defined by its solid classical roots paired with a passion for popular music genres, among which Latin American music and improvisation play a key role.

He has performed worldwide in top venues, such as Amsterdam's Concertgebouw, The Berlin Philharmonie, Vienna's Musikverein, The Los Angeles Opera house, among many others.

He has released numerous albums as soloist or leader and has collaborated in dozens of productions for various artists. He was nominated for a Latin Grammy in 2019 for his album AMERICA with piano music of George Gershwin and Astor Piazzolla in the "Best Classical Album" category.

He initiated his piano studies with his father (Gerardo Constantini) and later received his bachelor's degree in Finland, his master's degree in The Netherlands, and finally the diplome de concert in Paris. He was a pupil and eventually assistant of maestro Aquiles Delle Vigne, disciple of legendary pianists Claudio Arrau and Gyorgy Cziffra.

== Awards and nominations (selection) ==
- 2019 - Latin Grammys, nominated for best classical album.
- 2005 - Astor Piazzolla International competition, 1st prize
- 2001 - Litmann Competition (NY), 1st prize

== Discography ==
- 2013 – Suite Latinoamericana (Silvox)
- 2015 – Reflets dans l´eau (IBS Classical)
- 2016 – Obstinado (Claudio Constantini Quintet)
- 2018 – Debussy Complete Preludes (IBS Classical)
- 2019 – AMERICA (IBS Classical)
- 2020 – 20th Century Tango
- 2021 – INCANDESSENCE
- 2022 – Piano Cosmos
- 2023 – Bach (Warner Music Spain)
- 2024 – An Imaginary Soundtrack
- 2024 – Efímero
- 2024 – Bach: Partitas bwv.1004/1006 & Suite bwv.1007
