= Vincent Ghadimi =

Belgian pianist, composer and music educator (born 1968)

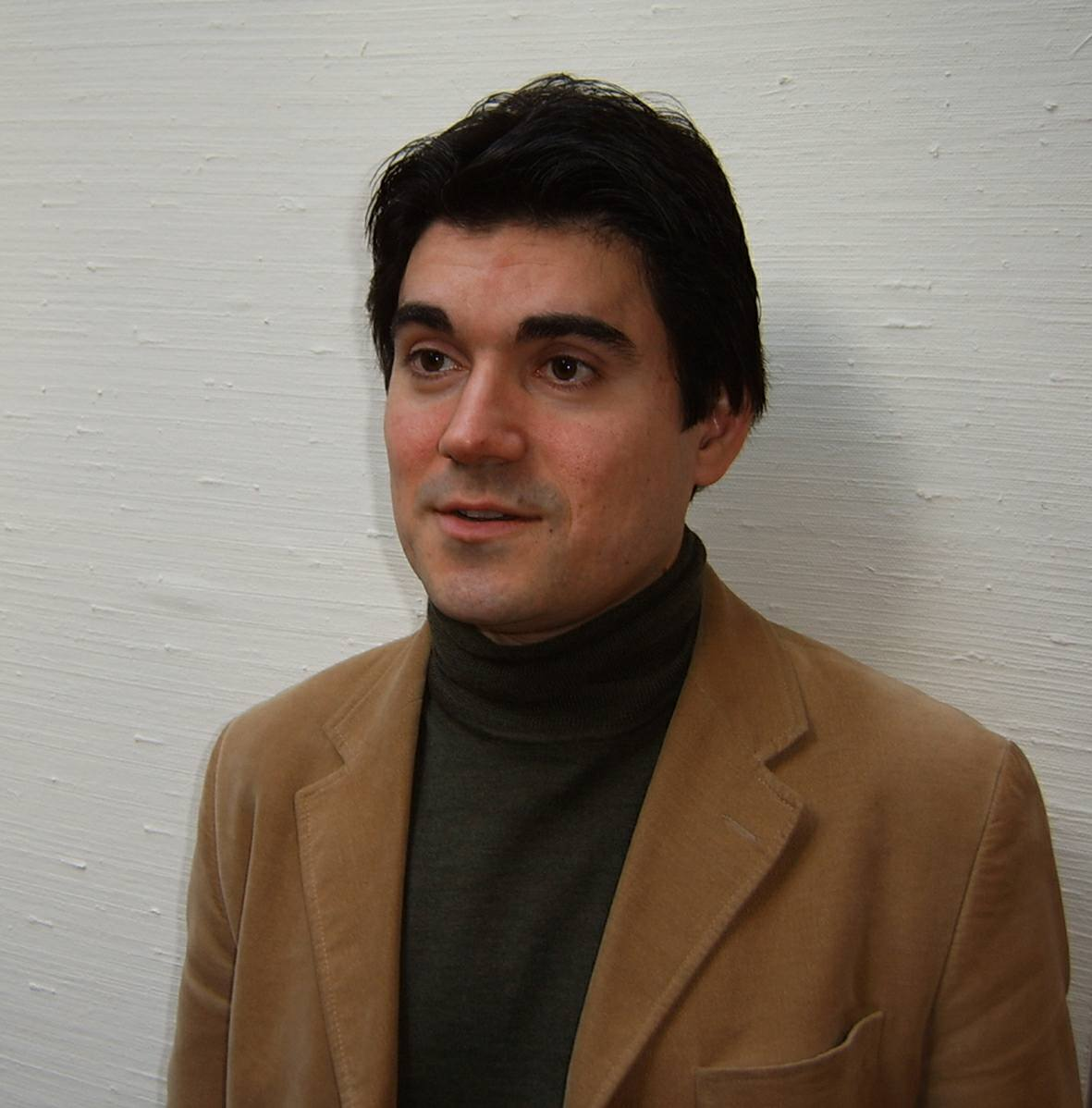
- Ghadimi in 2008
- Born: 4 September 1968 (age 57); Rocourt, Liège, Belgium
- Education: Schaerbeek Academy; Royal Conservatory of Brussels; Rotterdam Conservatory; École Normale de Musique de Paris
- Occupations: Pianist; composer; music educator
- Years active: 2000s–present
- Musical career
- Genres: Classical

Vincent Ghadimi (born 14 September 1968 in Rocourt, Liège Province) is a Belgian pianist and composer, a professor of piano and solfège and an accompanist at the Dutch-speaking Academy of Brussels.

== Biography ==
=== Training ===
Ghadimi took his first private music lessons at the age of fifteen with the composer and choir director Walter Vandorpe. He then undertook musical studies at the Schaerbeek Academy where he studied piano with Leonardo Anglani.

He then attended history of music classes (Henri Vanhulst) and solfège (Etienne De Lombaert) at the Royal Conservatory of Brussels where he obtained the first piano prizes (Jean-Claude Vanden Eynden) and chamber music (Serge Bémant), as well as the Higher Diploma of specialized solfège (Michel Lysight). He also studied harmony and counterpoint at Franklin Gyselynck's Conservatory in Brussels.

At the Rotterdam Conservatory, he obtained the diploma of Master of Music for piano and chamber music with great distinction in Aquiles Delle Vigne's class as well as a specialization in piano, four hands and two pianos, with Nelson Delle-Vigne Fabbri. He then studied with the latter for three years at the École Normale de Musique de Paris and also attended master classes by Lazar Berman, Zoltán Kocsis, Andrei Nikolsky, and Peter Eicher.

He also attended various internships in Mannheim, the Mozarteum University Salzburg (three consecutive years), the Summer Festival in Flaine, the École Normale de Musique de Paris, in Braine-l'Alleud (Music-A Braine L'Alleud), he became Nelson Delle-Vigne Fabbri's assistant the time of an internship. Ghadimi received early written encouragement from composer Joaquín Rodrigo.

Passionate about teaching of conducting by Sergiu Celibidache, he followed the phenomenology of music internships with his assistant Konrad von Abel. It is in this spirit that he gave a performance in a Catholic college (Sint-Jozef) in Sint-Niklaas in 2009 as part of "The Milena Principle", an organization of which he was a member. Ghadimi has also taken some choral conducting courses with Denis Menier and is currently pursuing his studies with Xavier Haag. He is part of the "À Chœur Joie" movement and leads The Egmont Voices choir.

== Career ==
He participates as a composer and conductor of children's choirs and as a conductor in the children's opera "Décamero lala" (performed at the Centre for Fine Arts, Brussels for Jeugd en Muziek Brussel, in May 2005). As such, and in order to better prepare the children's choir, he took singing lessons for two years at Evelyne Bohen's in the Hoofdstedelijke Academie voor muziek, woord en dans.

In December 2012, he took part in a duet with his wife Cécile Marichal to a concert in support of the Cancer Support Group project at the Evere Cultural Centre.

Le Crocodile en-chanté, a musical tale performed with Laurence Renson (mezzo-soprano) is performed at the Entrela (cultural centre of Evere) as part of Famizik on March 30, 2013.

He currently resides in Nivelles and is a full professor of piano and chamber music at the Dutch-speaking Academy in Brussels (Hoofdstedelijke Academie), as an artist he is part of the "Tournées art et vie" (French Community of Belgium).

In 2005, he and his wife, harpist Cécile Marichal, created the Polyface ensemble, which regularly performs in concert (Atelier de la Dolce Vita, Atelier Marcel Hastir, Auditorium Maene, Auditorium Hanlet, Centre Culturel les Chiroux, L'Heure Musicale, Festival au château d'Attalens in Switzerland...), exploring the little known repertoire for piano and harp, as well as the solo repertoire of these two instruments.

== Awards ==
Ghadimi is the holder of two first prizes in international piano competitions:

- 1993: "Doelen", Rotterdam
- 1995: Ibiza International Piano Competition

== Works and recordings ==
In addition to his piano career, Ghadimi composed many works:

- 1991: Nutations for clarinet and piano, éd. Alain Van Kerckhoven recorded at René Gailly by Ronald Van Spaendonck and Leonardo Anglani.
- 1992: Premiere at the Conservatoire Royal de Bruxelles: Opuscule for instrumental ensemble.
- 2002: Jongleurs de Têtes for solo piano written for the Orléans competition (played by Marina Scalafiotti) obtains in its second version the Diplôme d'Honneur at the TIM 2006 competition, dedicated to Roberto Plano.
- 10 chansons pour enfants (in Dutch), voice-piano version, published by Lantro Music, on texts by Henk Pringels.
- 2006: Premiere of Mémoires d'enfance for piano, dedicated to Benjamin Rawitz, éd. Lantro Musicat the Belgian Contemporary Music Festival
- 2 Préludes for piano dedicated to Nelson Delle-Vigne and Cécile Marichal, éd. Lantro Music.
- Toccatine for piano dedicated to Jan Michiels.
- Toccata for harp, dedicated to Cécile Marichal, éd Lantro Music
- Zoo, pedagogical work for the harp, éd. Lantro Music
- Circus, pedagogical work for the piano.
- Petite suite antique pour flûte et harpe (Prélude-Sarabande-Menuet-Gigue), played by Sophie Hallynck and Denis-Pierre Gustin
- Cheese-Impromptu for harp and piano
- Pop Corn for string orchestra, dedicated to the Desafinado Ensemble, direction Gabriel Laufer.
- Verd ‘Ivresse’ for violin and piano, dedicated to the Gemini Duo
- 2015: Belgian premiere on April 25 at L'atelier Marcel Hastir (Brussels): Fantomas fantasy quasi sonata for cello and piano, inspired by the work of the poet Ernst Moerman), world premiere in Mexico in November 2014 (then in Bucharest) by the Florescu-Fernandez duo
- 2014: Verwonding and Vers, two Lieder for soprano and harp, created by Martine Reyners and Cécile Marichal at the Overpelt Cultural Centre (September 2014) to texts by August Van Cauwelaert (texts about the First World War).
- 2008–2009: De Zwerver en de Roos musical tale for vocal quartet and piano, written as part of Jeugd en Muziek Brussel, for 6 performances, dedicated to the Vocamabile Ensemble, texts by Geert Vermeire.

== Bibliography ==
- Thierry Levaux (2006). "Ghadimi, Vincent". Dictionnaire des compositeurs de Belgique du Moyen-Âge à nos jours (in French). Éditions Art in Belgium. p. 736. ISBN 2-930338-37-7. OCLC 68910673. Levaux2006..
- Flavie Roquet (dir.) (2007). Lexicon Vlaamse componisten geboren na 1800 (in Dutch). Roeselare: Roularta Books. p. 346. ISBN 978-90-8679-090-6. Roquet2007..
