= Dubravka Tomšič Srebotnjak =

Slovenian pianist and music teacher (born 1940)

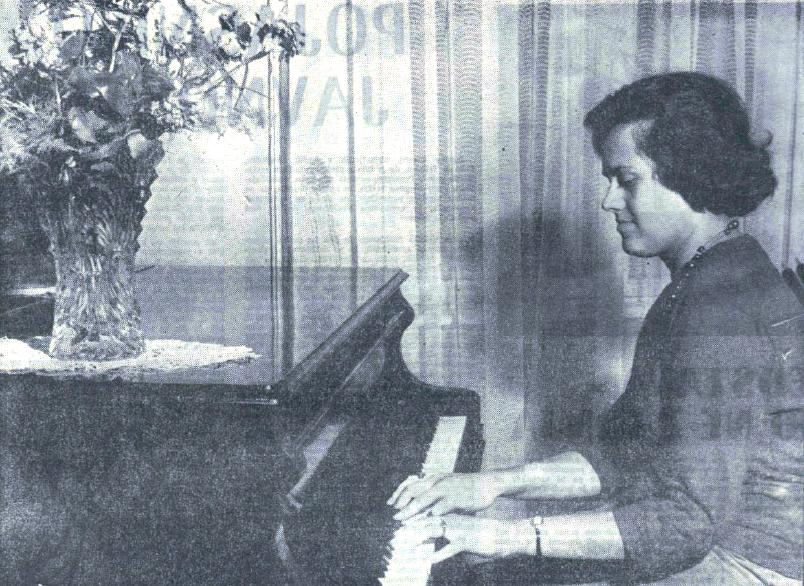
Dubravka Tomšič Srebotnjak, 1962

Dubravka Tomšič Srebotnjak (born 7 February 1940 in Dubrovnik, Croatia, Kingdom of Yugoslavia) is a Slovenian pianist and music teacher.

== Early life ==
Tomsic received private lessons at a very young age and continued with education at the Music High School in Ljubljana and later at the Slovene Academy of Music under professor Zora Zarnik. Following the advice of concert pianist Claudio Arrau, she went to the United States at age 12 and in 1957 graduated from Juilliard School of Music in New York. Her teachers were Katherine Bacon and Alexander Uninsky. Arthur Rubinstein heard her New York Town Hall recital and invited her to study with him privately in the late 1950s. Tomšič became one of Rubinstein's protégées.

== Career ==
Tomsic has been teaching piano at the Slovene Academy of music in Ljubljana since 1967. She has had a wide ranging concert career and is often invited to judge piano competitions including Van Cliburn, Leeds, L. v. Beethoven, Clara Haskil, and others. Dubravka Tomšič is very much sought after as a performer, making recital and concerto appearances all over Europe, Asia, North America, Mexico, Australia and Africa. She is credited with more than 3,500 performances and more than 20 records and 70 CD releases. For her artistic and pedagogic endeavours she has received numerous awards: 3rd prize at the Ferruccio Busoni International Piano Competition (Bolzano, 1961), Prešeren Fund Award (1962), 1. award at Mozart's festival recital (Brussels, 1967), Župančič Award (1970), gold lyre SUMUJ Award (1974), Prešeren Award (1975), AVNOJ Award (1976), Golden Award of the University in Ljubljana for her pedagogic and artistic achievements (1989), etc. She is an honorary member of the Slovene Philharmonics since 1995.

Her students include: Majda Martinc, Sonja Pahor, Hinko Haas, Lidija Stanković, Tatjana Ognjanović, Tomaž Petrač, Anja German, Miha Haas, Slaven Kulenovic, Natalija Šaver, Tadej Horvat, Sara Rustja Turniški, Stanislav Krutilov and Fada Azzeh.

== Personal life ==
She was married to the late Slovenian composer Alojz Srebotnjak and has a son Martin Srebotnjak, who is a Slovenian film director.
