= Kurt Engel =

Austrian classical pianist (1909–1942)

- Engel in Warsaw (1932)

Background information
- Born: January 14, 1909; Vienna, Austria-Hungary
- Died: January 22, 1942 (aged 33) Upper West Side, Manhattan, New York, U.S.
- Years active: 1932–1942

Kurt Engel (January 14, 1909 (Note: Some biographies claim 1910 but do not give a precise date.) – January 22, 1942) was an Austrian classical pianist and composer. He studied in Vienna with Emil von Sauer and Ignaz Friedman and won tenth prize at the II International Chopin Piano Competition in 1932. He performed as a soloist and accompanist in Vienna and across Europe.

In 1938, Engel emigrated to the United States by way of Belgium and settled in New York City as a refugee. He played benefit concerts for Jewish organizations and made his Carnegie Hall debut in 1941. He gave a Carnegie Hall recital in aid of the British War Relief Society later that year. Engel died of a heart attack in 1942 while teaching a student, shortly before another planned Carnegie Hall recital.

== Biography ==
=== Early life and education ===
Engel was born in Vienna in the Austro-Hungarian Empire in 1909. His father was Heinrich Engel. He studied piano under the German composer Emil von Sauer and Polish pianist Ignaz Friedman.

=== Career in Vienna ===
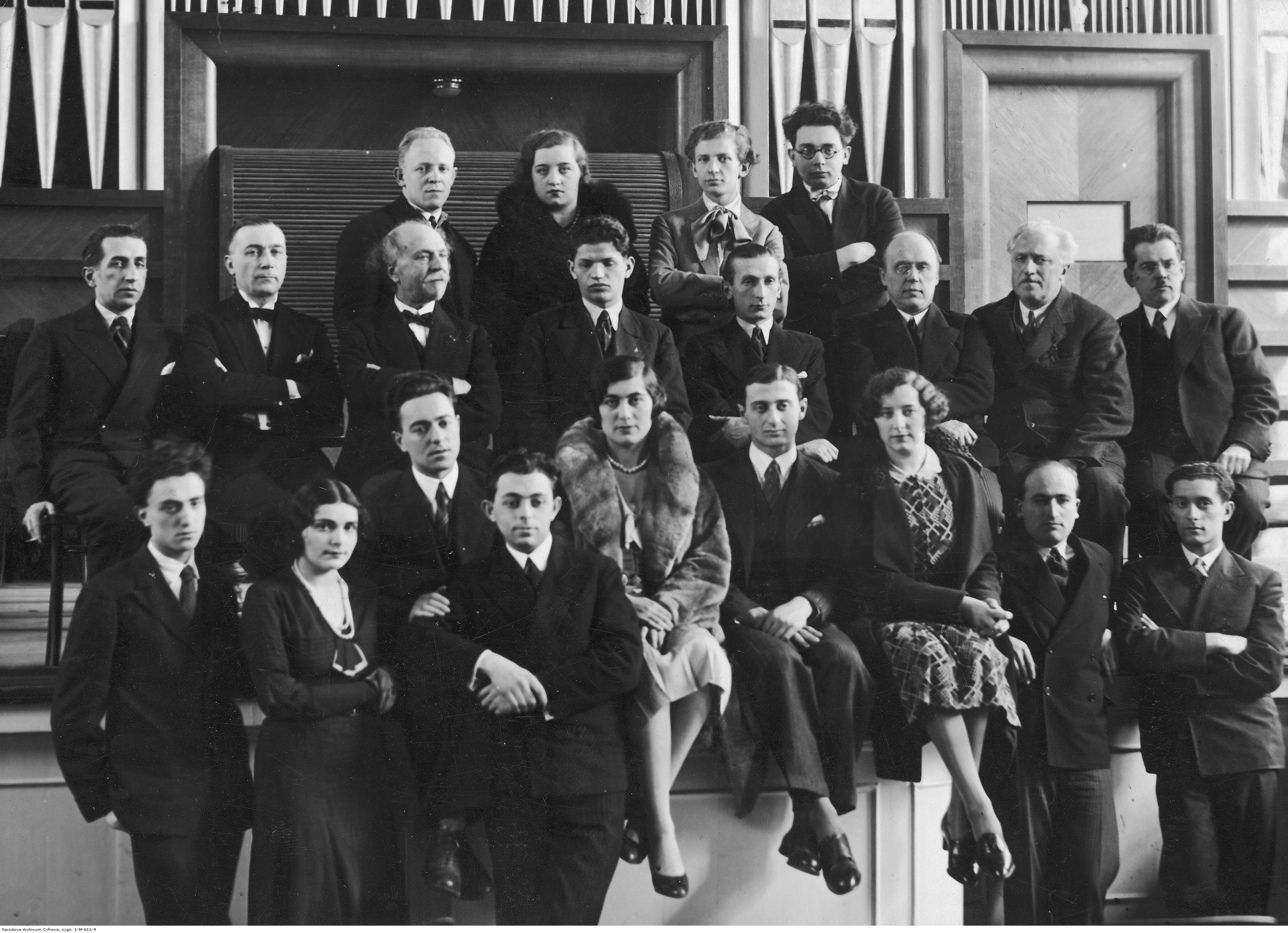
Engel (front row, far right) with competitors and jurors of the Chopin competition in Warsaw (1932)

In 1932, he entered the second edition of the International Chopin Piano Competition, where he won tenth prize. Engel performed with major European symphony orchestras, including as a soloist, in venues across Western European capitals. He was a pianist in a "subscription series" in Italy and Spain.

On November 29, 1932, he delivered a recital that included Liszt's transposition of Bach's Great Fantasia and Fugue in G minor (BWV 542), Brahms' Four Pieces for Piano, Op. 119, and Chopin's Barcarolle at the Vienna Konzerthaus. He also accompanied violinists including Ruth Posselt in November 1932 and Kurt Fuchsgelb early the following year in Vienna. In 1935, Engel performed works by Austrian and German composers with the Mildner Quartet. The Wehrmacht played a piece he composed, titled "Allen voran. Marsch" (First and Foremost, March!) at the Konzerthaus in 1941.

=== New York ===
Engel migrated to the United States through Belgium in 1938, a year before the outbreak of World War II. He settled in New York as a refugee, and on November 16, 1938, he performed a concert in Brooklyn organized by the American Palestine Music Association (MAILAMM) with Hans Heinz and Miriam Shomer Zunser, raising US$202. He also participated in a concert at the Brooklyn Jewish Center in March 1939 with Sarah Gorby.

He made his debut at Carnegie Chamber Hall on January 14, 1941, playing Chopin's Waltz in A-flat major, Op. 42. The Musical and Sewing Machine Courier remarked that he proved "a well grounded musician with notable technical equipment". Later that year, he gave a recital at Carnegie Hall as part of a charity event hosted by the Veritas Lodge of Free and Accepted Masons to raise funds for the British War Relief Society. The performance on April 22, 1941, was his last public appearance.

=== Death ===
Engel died of a heart attack on January 22, 1942, while instructing a piano student at his residence in the Upper West Side of Manhattan, aged 32 or 33. He had been programmed to deliver a recital at Carnegie Hall on February 8, which was reported by the press.
