= Abram Lufer =

Ukrainian pianist

Abram Lufer Абрам Луфер
- Born: 25 August 1905 [O.S. 12 August] Kiev, Russian Empire (present-day Ukraine)
- Died: 13 July 1948 (aged 42) Kiev, Ukrainian SSR, Soviet Union
- Genre: Classical
- Occupations: Pianist; teacher
- Instrument: Piano

Abram Mykhailovych Lufer (Note: Ukrainian: Абрам Михайлович Луфер, romanized: Abram Mykhailovych Lufer) (25 August 1905 [O.S. 12 August] – 13 July 1948) was a Soviet and Ukrainian pianist.

== Biography ==
Abram Lufer was born in Kyiv, he took musical education in the Kyiv Music School in 1925 under Hryhorii Beklemishev, then studying at the Lysenko Musical Institute and graduating in 1928. The following year he was the head of the piano department there.

In 1930, he won the All-Ukrainian Piano Competition in Kharkiv and was appointed the National Philharmonic Society of Ukraine's soloist. Two years later he was awarded a 4th prize at the II International Chopin Piano Competition - having tied with Bolesław Kon, the 3rd prize winner, but he lost at the coin flipping. His disciple Tetiana Holdfarb was awarded a 9th prize at the competition's next edition.

Lufer was appointed head director of the Kyiv Conservatory in 1934, Lufer supported a three-staged musical education system in Ukraine, and created a music school in Kyiv for gifted children, under the support of the Kyiv Conservatory. This brought more people to the Kyiv Conservatory, and with higher student counts and a need for higher concert activity, Lufer renovated and expanded the conservatory, a government-funded concert hall was built with 850 seats. By the time of the conservatory's 25th anniversary in 1938, Lufer created the folk instrument and music department as the 6th department in the conservatory, along with a choir and opera studio and a postgraduate program, one of the earliest in the USSR.

When the Kyiv Conservatory was being invaded by Germany in 1941, Lufer and most of the institute moved to the Sverdlovsk Oblast, he was replaced by Viktor Ivanovsky initially, but due to sickness Ivanovsky couldn't hold the post, and was replaced by Ostap Lysenko.

By June 1944, when the occupation ended, Lufer went back to the conservatory and resumed his position as the director.

In 1945, during the Soviet Union control of Germany, the Sing-Akademie zu Berlin was looted, with most of its collection being transported to either Kyiv or Moscow, Lufer saw over the musical artifacts, and on 23 October 1945, he went to Germany to examine the Soviet findings of the Sing-Akademie Archive, 10 days later large parts of the archive were controversially moved into the Kyiv Conservatory, which were analysed and kept.

Lufer died in Kyiv.
