= Shlomi Constantini =

- שלומי קונסטנטיני
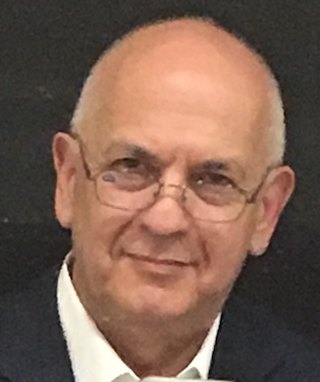
- Born: 24 November 1955 (age 70)
- Occupation: Pediatric neurosurgeon

Shlomi Constantini (born November 24, 1955) is an Israeli neurosurgeon and Full Clinical Professor at the Faculty of Medicine, Tel Aviv University. He is Director of the Pediatric Brain Center at Dana-Dwek Children's Hospital, Tel Aviv Sourasky Medical Center, and previously headed the Department of Pediatric Neurosurgery for more than 25 years.

== Biography ==
Constantini was born and raised in Tel Aviv. In 1973, he joined the Israel Defense Forces and served as an officer in the Paratroopers Brigade. He was discharged with the rank of lieutenant colonel.

From 1977 to 1983, Constantini studied medicine at the Hebrew University of Jerusalem. In 1984, he completed a master's degree in neurobiology. He subsequently trained in several areas of neurosurgery, including microneurosurgery, pediatric neurosurgery, neuroendoscopy, neuro-oncology and the treatment of congenital malformations.

From 1990 to 1997, he was a lecturer in neurosurgery at the Hebrew University–Hadassah Medical School. He later served as a senior lecturer at the Faculty of Medicine of Tel Aviv University. From 2002 to 2003, he was a visiting professor at The Hospital for Sick Children in Toronto, Canada. From 2003 to 2014, he was Clinical Associate Professor at Tel Aviv University, and from 2015 he has held the rank of Full Clinical Professor.

In 1996, Constantini became head of the Department of Pediatric Neurosurgery at Dana-Dwek Children's Hospital. Since 2006, he has also headed the Gilbert International Neurofibromatosis Center (GINFC). He currently heads the Pediatric Brain Center. His principal clinical interests include complex brain and spinal cord tumors, congenital malformations, neuroendoscopy and cerebrovascular disorders.

== Personal life ==
Constantini is the father of seven children and has several grandchildren.

His older sister, Miriam (Miri) Constantini-Souroujon (1949–2014), was a professor in the Department of Natural Sciences at the Open University of Israel and served as Dean of Research. She was also a researcher in the field of immunology.

== Research activity ==
Constantini has more than 400 research outputs listed by Tel Aviv University, including more than 300 journal articles. His academic work focuses on pediatric neurosurgery, neuro-oncology, neuroendoscopy, hydrocephalus and related areas.

== Professional and educational activity ==
During his presidency of the International Society for Pediatric Neurosurgery (ISPN) in 2023–2024, Constantini initiated the establishment of the ISPN Library, an educational project intended to consolidate and provide access to professional and educational resources in pediatric neurosurgery. The Library was launched in 2024, and Constantini serves as its Chair.

== Professional societies ==
- President of the International Society for Pediatric Neurosurgery (ISPN), 2023–2024.
- President-Elect of the Asian Australasian Society of Neurological Surgeons (AASNS).
- Founding member and Honorary President of the International Federation of Neuroendoscopy (IFNE).
- Former Vice President of the European Association of Neurosurgical Societies (EANS).
