= Julian von Károlyi =

Hungarian-German pianist (1914–1993)

- Károlyi in Warsaw (1932)
- Born: Gyula Károlyi de Nagykároly; January 31, 1914; Losonc, Kingdom of Hungary, Austro-Hungarian Empire (now Lučenec, Slovakia)
- Died: March 1, 1993 (aged 79); Munich, Bavaria, Germany
- Years active: 1932–1972

Julian von Károlyi (Note: German: Julian von Károlyi (German: [ˈjuːli̯aːn ˈjuːli̯ʊs fɔn ˈkaːʁoji]); English: Julian of Károlyi of Nagykároly (/ˈdʒuːliən ʌv ˈkɑːroʊli ʌv ˈnɒdʒkɑːroʊl/) (JOO-lee-ən əv KAH-roh-lee əv NODJ-kah-rohl); Hungarian: Gyula Károlyi de Nagykároly (Hungarian: [ˈɟulɒ ˈkaːroji dɛ ˈnɒɟkaːroj])) (January 31, 1914 – March 1, 1993) was a Hungarian and German classical pianist. Born in Losonc (now Lučenec, Slovakia) into the aristocratic Károlyi family, he made his debut in Budapest at the age of twelve and went on to study with Josef Pembaur, Alfred Cortot, and Ernst von Dohnányi.

Károlyi was best known as an interpreter of Chopin and Liszt, and later added works by César Franck, Claude Debussy, and Maurice Ravel to his repertoire. He performed widely across Europe and toured the United States and South America in 1951.

He settled permanently in Munich in the early 1940s, acquired German citizenship in 1956, and became a professor at the University of Würzburg in 1972. Several of his 1940s recordings were reissued in the 21st century, including a 2014 Melo Classic album of his Berlin Radio Symphony Orchestra performances.

== Early life and education ==
Károlyi was born in the Hungarian city of Losonc (present day Lučenec, Slovakia) within the Austro-Hungarian Empire in 1914. He was born to the House of Károlyi, an illustrious and wealthy Catholic aristocratic family from Nagykároly that had played an important role in Hungarian society since the 17th century.

He received piano lessons from Lajos Ákom, a well-known organist from Budapest. He made his debut in 1926 in Budapest at the age of twelve, performing Mozart's Piano Concerto No. 22 to great acclaim. His performance brought the attention of Béla Bartók, who recommended him to Margrit Varró. He studied piano for a year under Varró before moving to Munich in 1927 to study under Austrian pianist and composer Josef Pembaur.

Károlyi studied at the Leipzig Conservatoire as a Gewandhaus scholarship recipient under Max von Pauer from 1927 until 1930. The following year, he went to Paris to learn under the renowned pianist Alfred Cortot, and finally attended the Franz Liszt Academy of Music in Budapest from 1932 to 1934, where he studied under Hungarian composer Ernst von Dohnányi.

== Career ==
In 1929, at age fifteen, Károlyi gave his first public piano recital in London, and in 1930 the Russian bassist Feodor Chaliapin undertook a large-scale tour of England with him as his accompanist. His international breakthrough came with a highly successful piano recital at the Royal Albert Hall in London.

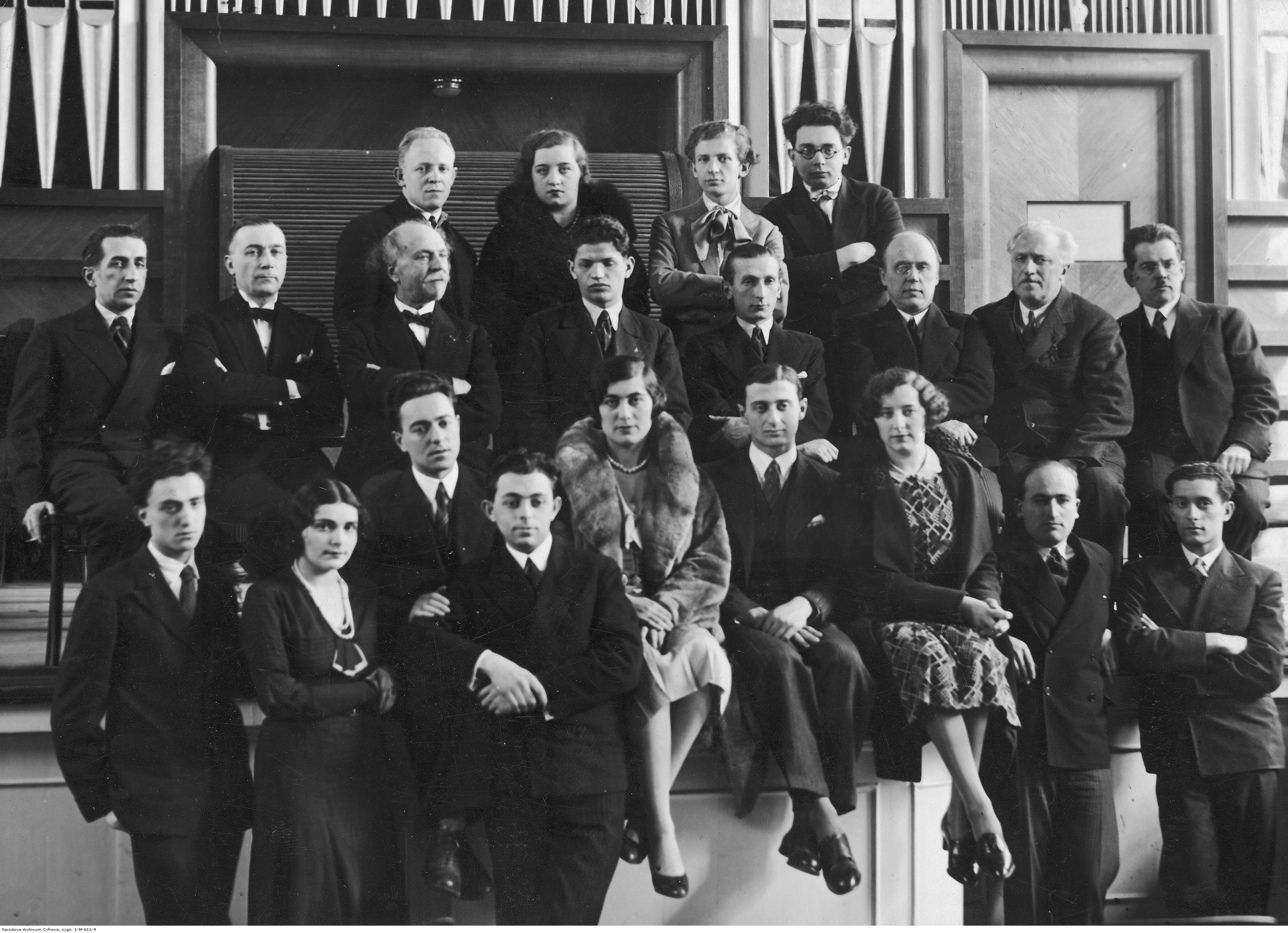
Károlyi (top row, 2nd from right) with competitors and jurors of the Chopin competition in Warsaw (1932)

He competed in the second edition of the International Chopin Piano Competition in 1932, winning ninth prize. Károlyi also competed in the International Piano Competition in 1933, where he was awarded an honorary diploma with a silver medal. From 1934 onwards, he performed regularly and played under the most prominent conductors and orchestras across Western Europe. Károly made his first performance in Munich in 1935 and began performing there yearly at the Munich Residenz and Deutsches Museum. He toured the United States and South America in 1951. A noted interpreter of Chopin, he later turned toward repertoire by César Franck, Claude Debussy, and Maurice Ravel.

Károlyi performed Richard Strauss's Burleske for the composer himself on June 11, 1944, Strauss's eightieth birthday, under the baton of Clemens Krauss. He performed across Europe, including with the Berlin Philharmonic. He also performed with conductors including Willem Mengelberg, János Ferencsik, Hans Knappertsbusch, Ferenc Fricsay, and Joseph Keilberth. The Burmese writer Wendy Law-Yone recounted being "enraptured" by one of Károlyi's performances of Chopin in 1967.

He was best known for his interpretations of Chopin and Liszt, and made recordings of works by Chopin, Liszt, and Rachmaninoff between 1943 and 1960. Some of these recordings were reissued in the 21st century to critical praise. In 2014, Melo Classic issued an album of his Berlin Radio Symphony Orchestra recordings from the 1940s, including Liszt's Piano Concerto No. 1 and No. 2. under the baton of Johannes Schüler. In 1960, the Münchner Merkur wrote that "Károlyi is regarded as one of the finest Chopin interpreters" in a review, and musicologist Joachim Kaiser wrote in 1964 that he and Chopin's music had "a kind of pre-established harmony".

In the early 1940s, Károlyi settled permanently in the Neuhausen-Nymphenburg borough of Munich. He acquired German citizenship in 1956 and became a professor at the University of Würzburg in 1972. Notabe students include the German composer Claus Kühnl. He served as a juror for the Ibiza International Piano Competition in Spain.

Károlyi died in Munich on March 1, 1993, aged 79.
