= Teodor Gutman =

Soviet pianist and teacher (1905–1995)

Teodor Gutman Теодор Гутман
- Portrait c. 1932

Background information
- Born: Teodor Davidovich Gutman; November 11, 1905; Kiev, Russian Empire
- Died: February 14, 1995 (aged 89) Moscow, Russia
- Education: Kiev Conservatory; Moscow Conservatory
- Occupations: Pianist; pedagogy
- Years active: 1932–1995
- Award: Honored Artist of the RSFSR

Teodor Davidovich Gutman (known in the West as Theodor Gutman; November 11 [O.S. October 29] 1905 – February 14, 1995) was a Russian and Soviet pianist and teacher. A pupil and later assistant of Heinrich Neuhaus at the Moscow Conservatory, he spent most of his career teaching at the Gnessin Institute, where his students included several pianists and jazz musicians who went on to notable careers of their own.

== Early life and education ==
Gutman was born in Kiev, then part of the Russian Empire, in 1905 to a family of Ashkenazi Jews. His father was a pianist who had trained at the Vienna Conservatory and worked at the Kiev Opera, and gave Gutman his first piano lessons before his death in 1918.

That year, Gutman entered the Kiev Conservatory and studied under Józef Turczyński, a pupil of Anna Yesipova and Ferruccio Busoni. Artists at the conservatory including Felix Blumenfeld, Vladimir Horowitz, and Boleslav Yavorsky were an early influence. He also befriended fellow student Kirill Kondrashin. After Turczyński's departure for Poland, Gutman continued his studies under Heinrich Neuhaus, becoming his first student. When Neuhaus took up a post at the Moscow Conservatory in 1926, Gutman followed him to Moscow and enrolled in his class there, graduating with a gold medal in 1930.

== Career ==
Gutman was among the more actively concertizing of Neuhaus's students in the years immediately following his graduation. In 1928, he began playing as a soloist with the Moscow Philharmonic Orchestra. In 1932, he competed in the second edition of the International Chopin Piano Competition in Warsaw, taking eighth prize. The following year, he took third prize at the first All-Union Competition of Performing Musicians in Moscow.

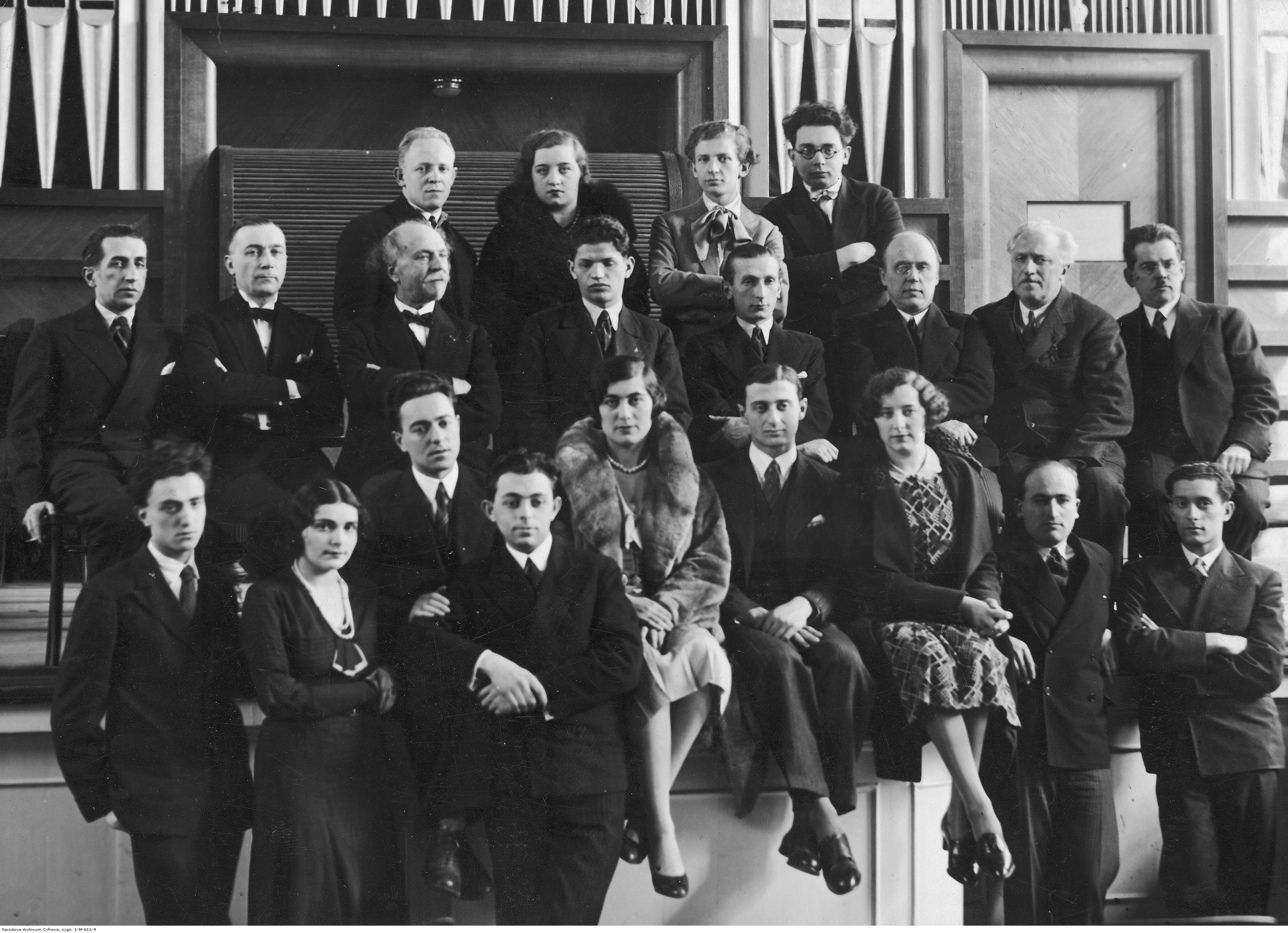
Gutman (1st row, 3rd from left) with jurors and laureates of the II International Chopin Piano Competition (1932)

Writing in his 1938 survey Heinrich Neuhaus and His School, the critic Arnold Alshvang praised Gutman's playing for its thoroughness and finish, noting the absence of careless or unresolved passages and describing his tone as warm and unassuming. His concert career became progressively less prominent as his teaching commitments grew, and few of his performances were preserved commercially. He played with the Leningrad Philarmonic Orchestra in 1946 along with Boris Gusman. That year, the Russian composer Anatoly Drozdov remarked that:

Gutman is an artist of serious, profound thought, mature mastery, and a wide dynamic range—more Apollonian than Dionysian in nature.

— Anatoly Drozdov (1946)

Gutman began teaching at the Moscow Conservatory soon after graduating and became a full professor in 1942, but lost his position following the evacuation to Perm, Russia during the Nazi German invasion. He returned to Moscow in 1943, and a year later was invited to teach at the Gnessin Institute (now the Gnessin Russian Academy of Music), where he remained on the faculty for the rest of his life. He headed the piano department, and in 1966 shared leadership with Alexander Iokheles. His nearly seventy years of teaching were unusual even among the Moscow piano school's long-serving pedagogues. In 1985, a musical celebration was held in Moscow in honor of his eightieth birthday. He was awarded the title of Honoured Worker of the Arts Industry of the RSFSR in 1991.

Among his students were the pianists Vladimir Tropp, Vladimir Monastyrsky, Irina Berkovich, Tatiana Zelikman, Naum Grubert, and Konstantin Lifschitz, as well as the jazz musicians Igor Bril and Leonid Chizhik.

Gutman died in Moscow on February 14, 1995, aged 89. He was buried at the Vvedenskoye Cemetery.

== Personal life ==
His son, Yuli Gutman, also played piano.
