= Leonid Chizhik =

Moldovan musician (born 1947)

Leonid Chizhik, also known as Leonid Arkadievich Chishik, was born on January 1, 1947, in Chişinău, Moldavian Soviet Socialist Republic. He is a jazz pianist and university lecturer at the universities of Weimar and Munich. Since 1991, Leonid Chizhik and his family have been living in Munich, Germany.

== Biography ==
Chizhik comes from a Jewish family. He studied at the state school of music in Kharkov in 1954. At the age of 15, he started appearing in bands. He studied at the Gnessin Institute, Moscow, then studied composition, musicology, and piano with Teodor Gutman, graduating as a concert pianist. He played in the trio with Georgy Garanjan's Melodija Ensemble in Moscow at café Molodjoschnoje (Youth). His main occupation, however, was in the state Varietéorchester. After playing for the first time as a classical soloist, he played jazz in public in 1974. He played on the debut album from Melodija. Afterwards he started his own trio, and he gained "popularity [as] a grandmaster of the concert jazz piano".

== Reception ==
P. Frederick Starr describes Chizhik as a "virtuoso pianist who combines the terrifying speed of Art Tatum with the delicate attack of Teddy Wilson." Although he plays bebop with phrasing, "the lyrical and romantic element in his play seems to be everywhere." For Starr, Chizhik is in the tradition of Alexander Tsfasman; he has also recorded George Gershwin's music.

== Discography ==
- Reminiscences (Reminiscences) (Melodija, 1981)
- Jam Session Moscow (Fusion Records / Bellaphon, 1981) with Hans Kumpf
- In Concert (MFSL, 1986)
- Days Of Wine And Roses (Loft, 1987)
- Lockenhaus Collection: Opus Scherziando (Phillips, 1990)
- Les Pianos de la Nuit (La Roque d'Antheron) (DVD, Ideal Audience, 2002)
- Rag-Gidon-Time (Deutsche Grammophon, 2005)
- TRIBUTE - Leonid Chizhik and Friends (listen2this, 2007)
