= Imre Ungár =

Hungarian pianist (1909–1972)

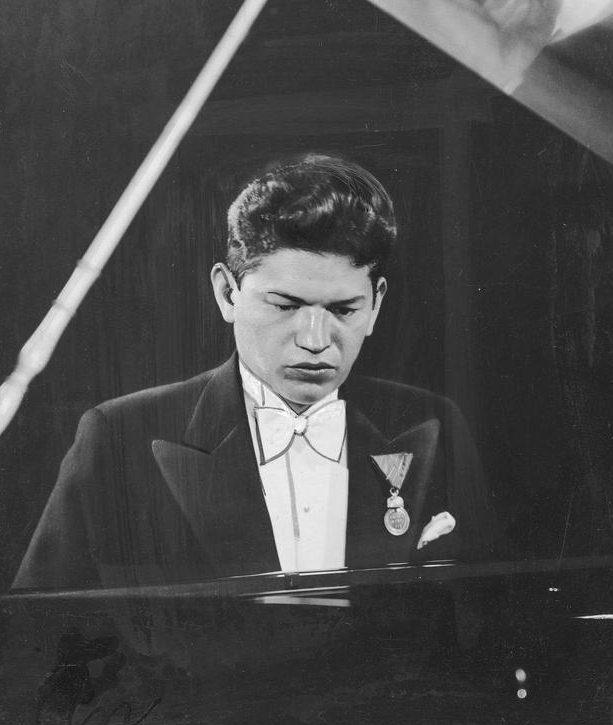

Background information
- Born: 23 January 1909; Budapest, Kingdom of Hungary
- Died: 22 November 1972 (aged 63) Budapest, Hungary
- Education: Franz Liszt Academy of Music
- Genres: Romanticism
- Years active: 1925–1972

Imre Ungár (23 January 1909 – 22 November 1972) was a Hungarian pianist. Blind since early childhood, Ungár was acclaimed for his depth of musicality and became a celebrity in post-war Hungary.

== Early life and education ==
Ungár was born in 1909 in Budapest, Kingdom of Hungary, to an Ashkenazi Jewish family. His parents were shopkeeper Ábrahám Ungár (1875–1938) and Hermina Katzburg. He became blind at the age of three.

While a student under István Thomán at the Franz Liszt Academy of Music he won the Competition for Young Talents, beginning a concert career through Hungary.

== Career ==
In 1932, Ungár took part in the II International Chopin Piano Competition. A Polish newspaper reported that "the audience was visibly moved as he played," and the jury's president announced that one member of the audience had fainting from "the heat and emotion" of his performance of the E minor Concerto. Niewiadomski described his "inner concentration, a consequence of his blindness" as creating "a resonance of tragedy in his playing, stirring the listener with almost every musical phrase." In an extraordinary reversal from the rules, the jury allowed Ungár to perform solo. He tied for 1st prize with Russian émigré Alexander Uninsky, who won by way of a coin flip.

He was also awarded the first prize of the Budapest Talent Competition at the National Talent Congress. In 1932, he was awarded the Military Merit Medal. With the start of World War II, he fled to the Netherlands, returning to Budapest in 1943. He began teaching at the Franz Liszt Academy of Music, where he taught pianists including Tadeusz Żmudziński.

Ungár was a celebrity jurist for the V International Chopin Piano Competition in 1955 along with Lev Oborin and Yakov Zak. Regarding piano technique, he wrote that "it is not the speed of the fingers: it is the ability to make the piano weep and smile."

He died in Budapest in 1972, aged 63.

== Personal life ==
He married Ilona Gelléri and had a son, István, who was born in 1945. His grandson, Apor Szüts, is a Hungarian composer.
