= Leonid Sagalov =

Soviet pianist

Leonid Sagalov (Kharkiv, 1910 – Moscow, 1940) was a Soviet pianist.

His fine performance in the II International Chopin Piano Competition, which earned him the 6th prize, paved the way for a concert career abroad, but he shortly afterwards settled back in Kharkiv, where he combined teaching in the city's Conservatory with a concert career along the Ukrainian SSR. Just a year after he was appointed a professor, the Nazi capture of Kharkiv forced him to flee to Moscow, where he died in unknown circumstances.
