= Alexander Uninsky =

American pianist (1910–1972)

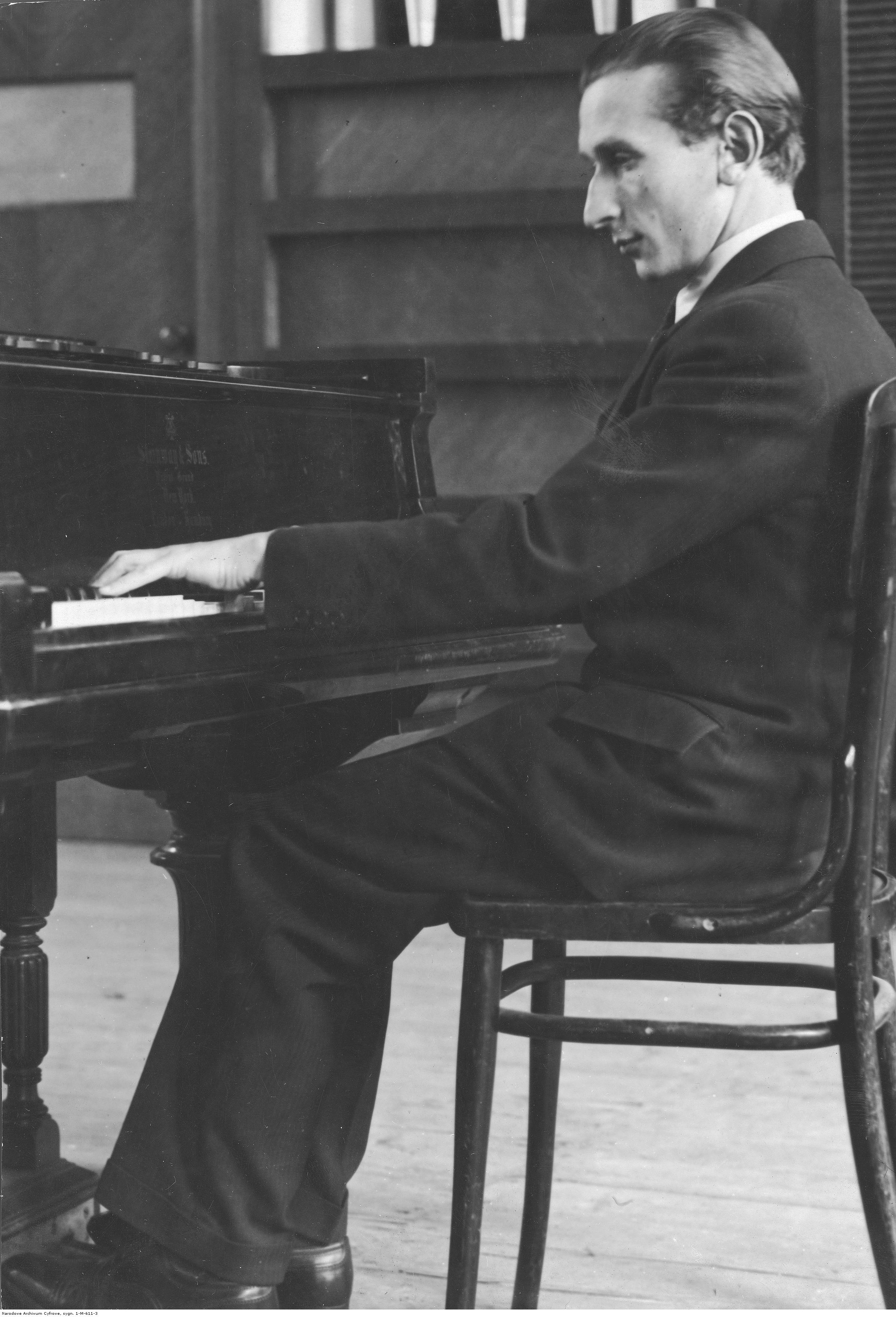
Uninsky during the II International Chopin Piano Competition

Alexander Uninsky (Ukrainian: Олександр Юнінський; Russian: Александр Юнинский, romanized: Aleksandr Yuninsky; 2 February [O.S. 20 January] 1910 – 19 December 1972) was a Ukrainian-born French and American pianist.

== Life and career ==
Alexander Uninsky was born in Kiev (then in the Russian Empire, now in Ukraine). He initially studied piano there in the Kiev Conservatory which had been opened in 1913, and whose other graduates included Vladimir Horowitz and Alexander Brailowsky.

He subsequently moved to Paris in 1923, where he studied with Lazare Lévy. He was awarded the conservatory's first prize for piano. In 1932 he won the II International Chopin Piano Competition. In fact, Uninsky tied for first place with the blind Hungarian pianist Imre Ungar, and the judges decided to award victory on the basis of the toss of a coin. Ungar lost.

In 1955, he took up a teaching post at the Toronto Conservatory of Music, where he numbered among his pupils the Canadian composer Bruce Mather. Mather commemorated his teacher in his 1974 composition In memoriam Alexander Uninsky.

Subsequently, he taught at the Southern Methodist University in Dallas, Texas. His pupils included Jeffrey Swann, David Golub and Dubravka Tomšič Srebotnjak.

He played his last concert in San José, Costa Rica, on October 19, 1972, for the celebration of the 75th anniversary of the National Theatre. He played Tchaikovsky's Piano Concerto No. 1 with the Costa Rican National Symphony Orchestra conducted by Gerald Brown. He was experiencing advanced arthritis.

He died two months later, on December 19, 1972, in Dallas.

== Recorded legacy and reputation ==
Uninsky was quickly signed up in the early 1950s by the newly formed Philips recording company. His Chopin playing is well represented in his recordings, including the complete Études, recorded in the 1950s, the complete Mazurkas and Impromptus recorded between 1959 and 1971, the Scherzos and Waltzes, as well as the piano concertos. His other recordings included works by Liszt.

His style is greatly reminiscent of Nikita Magaloff, who underwent the same influences of pre-revolutionary Russia and post-revolutionary Paris. His playing is unsentimental and elegant, but with a rubato that marks him as coming from an essentially early twentieth century aesthetic. It is not surprising that his clean, sober playing impressed the jury of the second Chopin Competition, which has been founded to combat the mannered, virtuoso tradition of Chopin playing which had marked the late 19th century. An indication of the 'modernness' of Uninsky's playing comes from a comment by Dinu Lipatti in a review he wrote in 1937 for Libertatea in which he says "How is it possible that Emil Sauer must play in the small Salle Érard, despite his glorious past, when a Brailowsky or Uninsky can pack the Salle Pleyel?"

== Recordings ==
- Fr. Chopin: Polonaises (Nos. 1–6), Epic Records LP -LC 3623
- Fr. Chopin: Etüden, Philips LP Nr. A 00405 L undated
- Fr. Chopin: Klavierkonzert Nr. 1 e-moll op.11, Das Residenz-Orchester Den Haag (W.Van Oterloo Dir.), Philips LP Nr. A 00651 R 1958
- Fr. Chopin: Klavierkonzert Nr. 1 e-moll op.11, Fontana Weltserie Folge 34 LP Nr. 695 033 Kl undated
- Fr. Chopin: Polonaise Nr. 6 As-dur op. 53 e-moll op.11, Fontana Weltserie Folge 34 LP Nr. 695 033 Kl undated
