= Aquiles Delle Vigne =

Argentine pianist

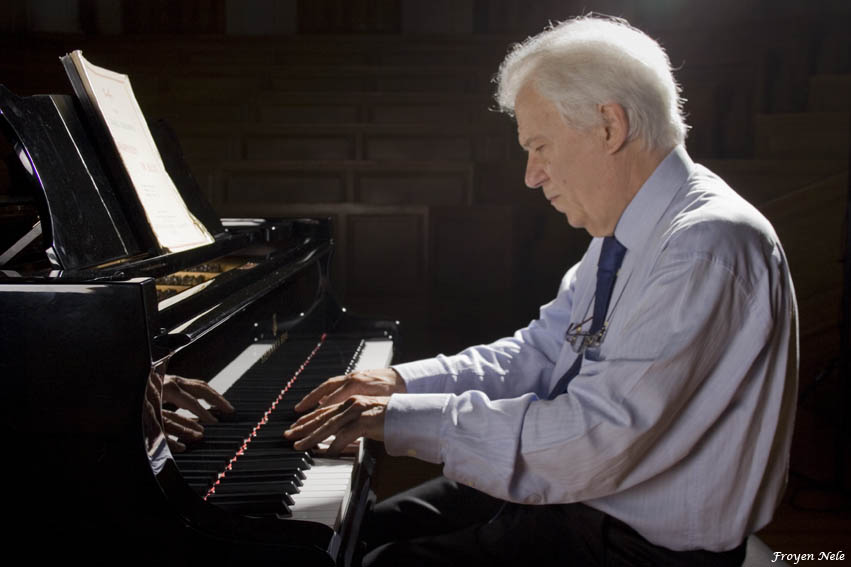
Aquiles Delle Vigne

Aquiles Delle Vigne (January 3, 1946 - January 21, 2022) was an Argentine pianist, born in Rosario. He won the Grand Prix at the "Alberto Williams" Competition in South America. In Europe, Delle Vigne completed his studies with Eduardo del Pueyo in Brussels.

In the mid-80s, Aquiles Delle Vigne, already established as a pianist in his maturity, participated in a masterclass by the Hungarian pianist György Cziffra in the town of Senlis (France); in order to prepare a recording of Liszt's Etudes.

Aquiles Delle Vigne has performed piano solo recitals in concert halls all around the world: Salle Gaveau in Paris, Santa Cecilia, Salle Gothique in Brussels, Arts Center in Seoul, Chulalongkorn Auditorium in Bangkok, Pablo Casals and Tsuda Hall in Tokyo, Villa Lobos Theatre in Brasilia, Cecilia Meirelles Hall in Rio de Janeiro, De Doelen in Rotterdam, Palais of the Music in Sofia, Palais des Beaux Arts in Brussels, South Melbourne Town Hall, as well as throughout South Africa and Cyprus.

He has accomplished 20 tournées in Japan, 8 in Australia, the United States of America and Mexico.

He has performed in the festivals in Gstaad, Flaine, Madrid, Laussane, Bern, Miami, Skopje, Ljubljana and Korea Euro Festival.

He also appeared as a soloist with many major orchestras in collaboration with conductors such as Yehudi Menuhin, Alberto Lysy, Georges Octors, Leopold Hager, Lee Dong-ho, André Vandernoot, Juan Carlos Zorzi, Flavio Scogna and Alexis Soriano, with the National Orchestras in Argentine, Belgium, Colombia, Mexico, the Orchestra of the Bulgarian Radio in Sofia, the Philharmonic Orchestras in Buenos Aires, Skopje, Fort Worth, Fort Wayne, Bucharest, Rio de Janeiro, São Paulo, Rosario, Bangkok, Parana, Lima, Mexico, Bogota, Camerata Menuhin, Belgische Radio en Televisie, and Carlos Chavez in Mexico DF.

Invited as a jury member for international piano competitions in Pretoria, Casagrande, Sydney, Cincinnati, Texas, Bremen, Bellini, etc., his career as a pianist was edged by a restless love for teaching.

He taught at the Rotterdams Conservatorium (Codarts) in The Netherlands for over 20 years. He was Visiting Professor at the Royal Northern College of Music in Manchester. He gave master classes at the Summer Academy in Salzburg, Académie du Cap Ferret Music Festival, in France, and at the Academia del Ridotto, in Italy. In his late years, he had his own academy: the Academia Internacional de Música Aquiles Delle Vigne at the University of Coimbra, in Portugal.

His teaching focused on interpretation, the meaning of the piece, knowledge of the historical, cultural and human context. He was a great admirer of Claudio Arrau, whom he also highlighted in his teachings throughout his life. He wrote two books: "The Innermost Journey of a Pianist" and "The problem of musical interpretation".

He considered himself a disciple of Claudio Arrau, Eduardo del Pueyo and György Cziffra.

Aquiles Delle Vigne has recorded for His Master's Voice, Naxos, BMG, BASF, Pavane, EMS, Wide Classique and Ars Produktion. Delle Vigne recorded several integrals: the Beethoven’s 32 Piano Sonatas, the Liszt’s Etudes, the Messiaen’s Preludes, the Ravel’s works for piano and violin with Alberto Lysy, the Concerti by Mendelssohn, and Années de Pèlerinage by Franz Liszt.

He resided in Brussels with his family, wife and children, during his lifetime.
