= Edward Prażmowski =

Polish pianist (1904–?)

- Born: 1904; Łódź, Congress Poland, Russian Empire
- Education: Helena Kijeńska Music Conservatory; Warsaw Conservatory
- Occupations: Pianist; piano teacher

Edward Prażmowski (1904 – ?) was a Polish pianist. He was a pupil of Henryk Melcer-Szczawiński and Józef Turczyński at the Warsaw Conservatory and was a finalist in the inaugural International Chopin Piano Competition in 1927. He performed with major symphony orchestras across interwar Poland.

== Early life and education ==
Prażmowski was born in Łódź, then part of Congress Poland within the Russian Empire, in 1904. He received his early musical education at the Helena Kijeńska Music Conservatory (now the Academy of Music in Łódź), where he also completed his secondary education. He later attended the Warsaw Conservatory, studying under the Polish composer Henryk Melcer-Szczawiński and pianist Józef Turczyński.

== Career ==
Prażmowski performed publicly in Łódź and Warsaw during the 1920s. On 9 November 1924, he appeared as a piano soloist with the Łódź Philharmonic Orchestra in a popular symphony concert conducted by Bronisław Szulc. His programme included Franz Liszt's Piano Concerto No. 2. The Polish magazine Głos Polski described his previous performances with the Warsaw Philharmonic and reported that a recital in February 1926 was intended, in part, to help finance his further studies abroad.

He entered the first edition of the International Chopin Piano Competition, held in Warsaw on the last week of January 1927, with 25 other pianists. After Soviet pianist Yuri Bryushkov withdrew from the final because of a hand injury, and his original substitute Maria Barówna also withdrew, Prażmowski was able to compete in the final round. He performed Frédéric Chopin's Piano Concerto No. 1 and was awarded a diploma of recognition by the jury, who also awarded this distinction to Dmitri Shostakovich, Jakob Gimpel, and Theo van der Pas.

Little is known about his later life, and none of his recordings are known to have survived.
