= Lunzer =

Lunzer is a surname meaning a "habitational name for someone from Lunz in Tyrol or from Lünzen near Soltau Lower Saxony"

== Notable people ==
- Alois Lunzer (1840–?), Austrian-born painter
- Jack V. Lunzer (1924–2016), Belgian-born British industrial diamond merchant

== See also ==
- Linzer
- Munzer
