= Mencer =

Mencer is a surname of either German or English origin, being a variant of several other surnames. Notable people with the surname include:

- Eli Mencer (born 1996), American professional football player
- Glenn Everell Mencer (1925-2007), American judge

== See also ==
- Malcolm Mencer Martin (1920-2010), Austrian-British pediatric endocrinologist
- Mentzer
- Mainzer
- Manser
