= I International Chopin Piano Competition =

Piano competition (1927)

The First International Fryderyk Chopin Piano Competition
- Date: 23–30 January 1927
- Venue: National Philharmonic, Warsaw
- Hosted by: Warsaw Music Society
- Winner: (Soviet Union) Lev Oborin

The I International Chopin Piano Competition (Polish: I Międzynarodowy Konkurs Pianistyczny im. Fryderyka Chopina) was the inaugural edition of the International Chopin Piano Competition, held from 23 to 30 March 1927 in Warsaw. Soviet pianist Lev Oborin was awarded the first prize.

== History ==
The competition was initiated by Jerzy Żurawlew, who began seeking funds for a piano competition in 1925, influenced by Aleksander Michałowski. Żurawlew recalled later:

I met with utter incomprehension, indifference and even aversion. The opinion among musicians was unanimous: Chopin is so great that he can defend himself. At the Ministry, it was announced that there were no funds for it and that the whole idea was unfeasible.

In this difficult situation, help arrived from Henryk Rewkiewicz—a businessman, music lover and board member of The Warsaw Music Society, who offered his personal financial guarantees to cover the entire deficit expected to arise from the first Competition. Many years later Jerzy Żurawlew wrote:

I was greatly helped by my friend Henryk Rewkiewicz, director of the Match Monopoly, who offered 15,000 złoty — a substantial sum at the time — for the Competition.

Ultimately, things picked up with the election of a new Polish president, Ignacy Mościcki, who became the patron of the Chopin Competition.

The competition was originally scheduled to start on 15 October 1926, the day of the unveiling of Wacław Szymanowski's Chopin Monument in the Łazienki Park, though it was delayed until 1927.

== Awards ==
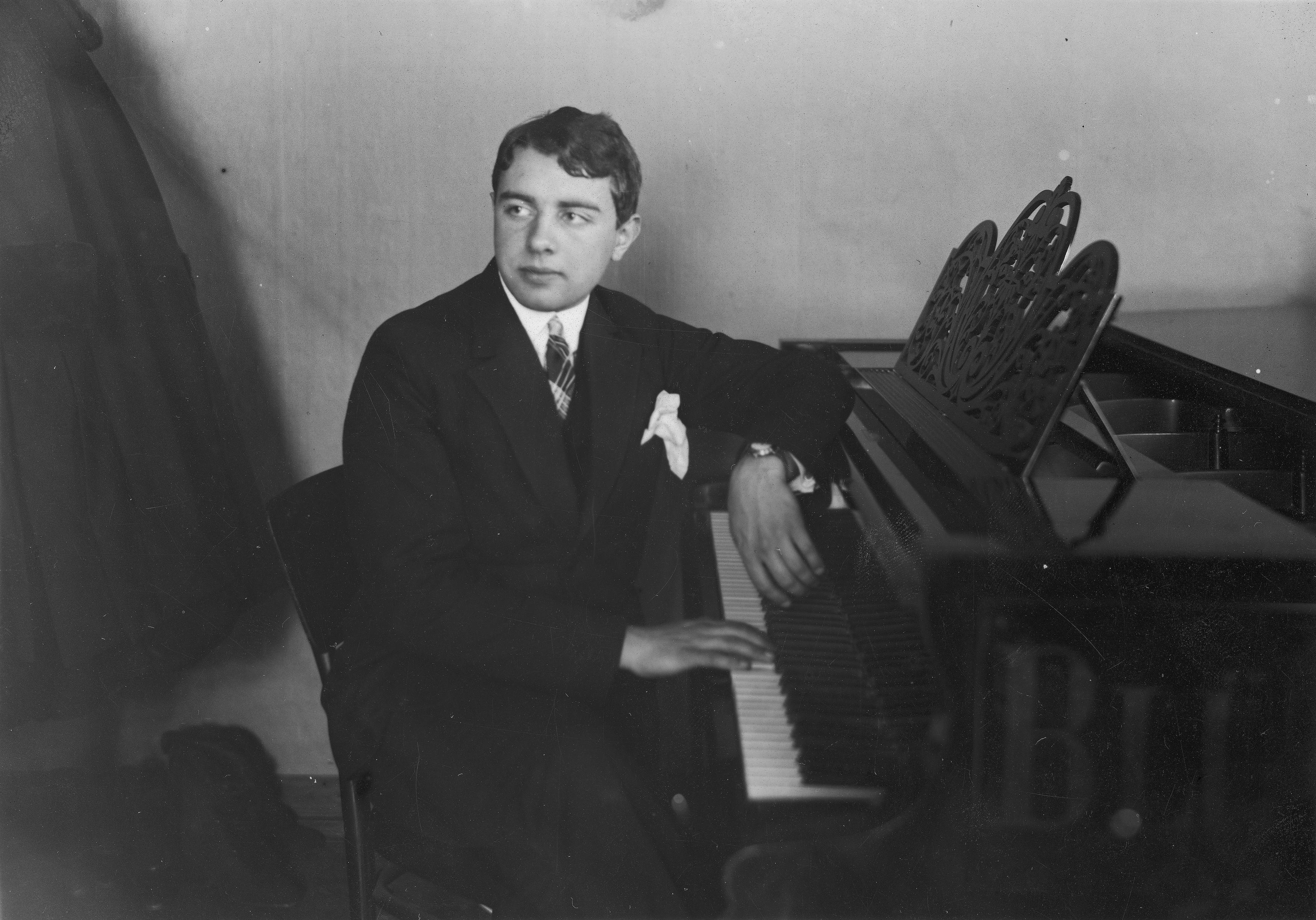
Lev Oborin, winner of the inaugural Chopin Competition

26 pianists took part in the competition, including 16 competitors from Poland. After an elimination round, 8 pianists were admitted to the final, where they performed two consecutive movements of one of Chopin's two piano concertos with the Warsaw Philharmonic.

As Żurawlew was convinced that only Polish musicians could truly understand Chopin's music, the jury was composed almost entirely of Poles, Alfred Hoehn of Germany, who judged the finals only, being the sole exception. Throughout the competition, the Polish press only presented Polish competitors as the real contenders for the prize, leading the public to expect a Polish victory. When Lev Oborin was awarded the first prize, it came as a shock and as a national humiliation, the Polish–Soviet War having ended just six years before.

A young Dmitri Shostakovich was among the participants, though he only received an honorable mention.

The following prizes were awarded:

Prize		Winner	
1st	5,000zł	Lev Oborin	Soviet Union
2nd	3,000zł	Stanisław Szpinalski	Poland
3rd	2,000zł	Róża Etkin	Poland
4th	1,000zł	Grigory Ginzburg	Soviet Union
HM		Yuri Bryushkov	Soviet Union
HM		Jakob Gimpel	Poland
HM		Gui Mombaerts	Belgium
HM		Leopold Münzer	Poland
HM		Theo van der Pas	Netherlands
HM		Edward Prażmowski	Poland
HM		Dmitri Shostakovich	Soviet Union
HM		Bolesław Woytowicz	Poland

One special prize was awarded:

Special prize	Winner	
Best Performance of Mazurkas	Henryk Sztompka	Poland

== Jury ==
The jury consisted of:

- (Poland) Zygmunt Butkiewicz
- (Poland) Zbigniew Drzewiecki
- (Germany) Alfred Hoehn (finals only)
- (Poland) Witold Maliszewski (chairman)
- (Poland) Piotr Maszyński
- (Poland) Henryk Melcer-Szczawiński
- (Poland) Aleksander Michałowski (first round only)
- (Poland) Zofia Rabcewicz
- (Poland) Adam Sołtys
- (Poland) Felicjan Szopski
- (Poland) Józef Śmidowicz
- (Poland) Józef Turczyński
- (Poland) Adam Wyleżyński
- (Poland) Jerzy Żurawlew
