= Pfennig (surname) =

Pfennig, Pfenning
Origin
- Language: German
- Meaning: Pfennig, penny
- Region of origin: Germany

Other names
- Variant forms: Pfenning, Pfenninger; Münzer

Pfennig (also Pfenning or Pfenninger) is a German surname. Notable people with the surname include:

- Frank Pfenning, professor of computer science
- Fritz Pfenninger
- Guillermo Pfening (born 1978), Argentine actor and director
- Norbert Pfennig (1925–2008), German microbiologist
- Jörn Pfennig (born 1944), German jazz musician, lyricist
- Oscar Pfennig (1880–1963), German architect
- Werner Pfennig (1937–2008), German trade unionist
