= Mainzer =

Mainzer is a surname. Notable people with the surname include:

- Amy Mainzer (born 1974), American astronomer
- Ferdinand Mainzer (1871–1943), German-Jewish gynaecologist and historical author
- Klaus Mainzer (born 1947), German scholar and philosopher
- Klaus Mainzer (rugby union) (born 1979), German international rugby union player
- Otto Mainzer (1903–1995), German-American writer

== See also ==
- Maizeray
- Maizerets
- Maizeroy
- Maizery
- Manzur
- Minzier
- Munzer
- Münzer
