= Artur Lemba =

Estonian composer (1885–1963)

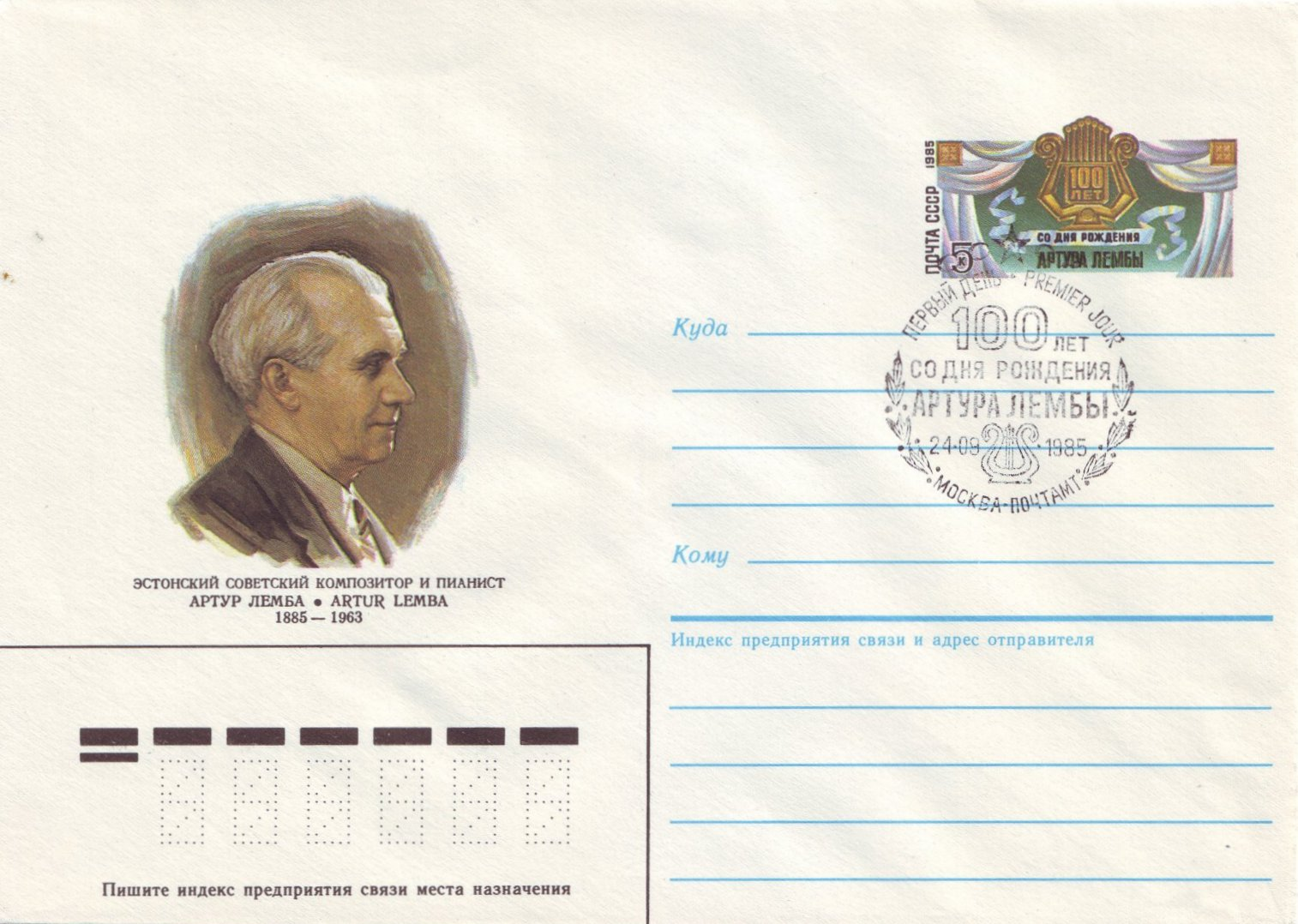
Soviet envelope with imprinted stamp, bearing a portrait of Artur Lemba, issued on his 100th birthday (24 September 1985). The envelope has been cancelled in Moscow on the first day of issue

Artur Lemba (24 September 1885 – 21 November 1963) was an Estonian composer and piano teacher, and one of the most important figures in Estonian classical music. Artur and his older brother Theodor (1876–1962) were the first professional pianists in Estonia to give concerts abroad. Artur's 1905 opera Sabina was the first opera composed by an Estonian. His Symphony No. 1 in 1908 was the first symphony composed by an Estonian.

Lemba was a finalist in the prestigious Anton Rubinstein Competition and later a professor at the Saint Petersburg Conservatory.

== Early life and education ==
Artur Lemba was born in Tallinn on 24 September 1885 as a son of piano tuner Gustav Lemba. Artur Lemba learned piano from his brother Theodor Lemba. In 1899, following in his brother's footsteps, he enrolled at the St. Petersburg Conservatory. There he studied piano with Carl van Arck, Prof. V. Tolstov and I. Borovka. His composition teacher was Nicolai Soloviev and he studied music theory with Anatoly Lyadov, Alexander Glazunov and Nikolai Rimsky-Korsakov.

In 1908, he graduated, receiving a gold medal in piano, a silver medal in composition, and the Anton Rubinstein prize, and was awarded a C. M. Schröder piano. At his graduation ceremony, Lemba performed his Piano Concerto No. 1.

In 1910, Artur Lemba participated in the Anton Rubinstein Competition for pianists, where he placed among the eight finalists, including Arthur Rubinstein and Edwin Fischer.

== Career ==
After his graduation in 1908, Lemba became a piano teacher at the St. Petersburg Conservatory. In 1915 he became a professor. He taught and gave concerts in Saint Petersburg until 1920.

Returning to Estonia, Lemba worked as a piano teacher, eventually becoming head of the piano department at the Tallinn Conservatory. Notable students included Elsa Avesson, Olav Roots, Villem Reimann, Veera Lensin, Kirill Raudsepp and others. In addition to the concerts in Estonia, Lemba performed in Saint Petersburg, Riga, Moscow, Odessa, Budapest, Helsinki and Stockholm.

== Music ==
Lemba composed in almost every genre, with two symphonies (the first of which is the earliest example by an Estonian composer), three overtures, four operas, three cantatas, chamber music for different ensembles and 30 choral works. For the piano, Lemba wrote five piano concertos, two sonatas, two sonatinas, two preludes and more than 20 études. His first Piano Concerto in G major (1905, revised 1910) is perhaps his best known work, described as having a memorable melody. It has been recorded by Mihkel Poll and the Estonian National Symphony Orchestra, conducted by Neeme Järvi.

Lemba's Poéme d’amour (1916) for violin and piano is also popular in the violin repertoire. Toccata Classics is issuing recordings of the chamber music.
