= Riaan =

Riaan is a generally male given name, popular in South Africa. The name can mean "little king". It is also a Hindu male given name. Notable people with the name include:

- Riaan Botha (born 1970), South African pole vaulter
- Riaan Cruywagen (born 1945), South African television news reader and voice artist
- Riaan Liebenberg, South African athlete
- Riaan Manser (born 1973), South African pioneering explorer
- Riaan Schoeman (born 1989), South African swimmer
- Riaan Smit (born 1984), South African rugby union footballer
- Riaan Stander (born 1972), South African serial killer
- Riaan Viljoen (born 1983), South African rugby union rugby player
- Riaan Walters (born 1980), Namibian cricketer
- Riaan van Zyl (born 1972), American rugby union player
- Riaan Sharma (born 2014), Australian middle schooler

== See also ==
- Adriaan
- Rian
- Rhian
