= Rabcewicz =

Rabcewicz is a surname. Notable people with the surname include:

- Ladislaus von Rabcewicz, Austrian engineer
- Zofia Rabcewicz, Polish pianist
