= Zofia Rabcewicz =

Polish pianist (1870–1947)

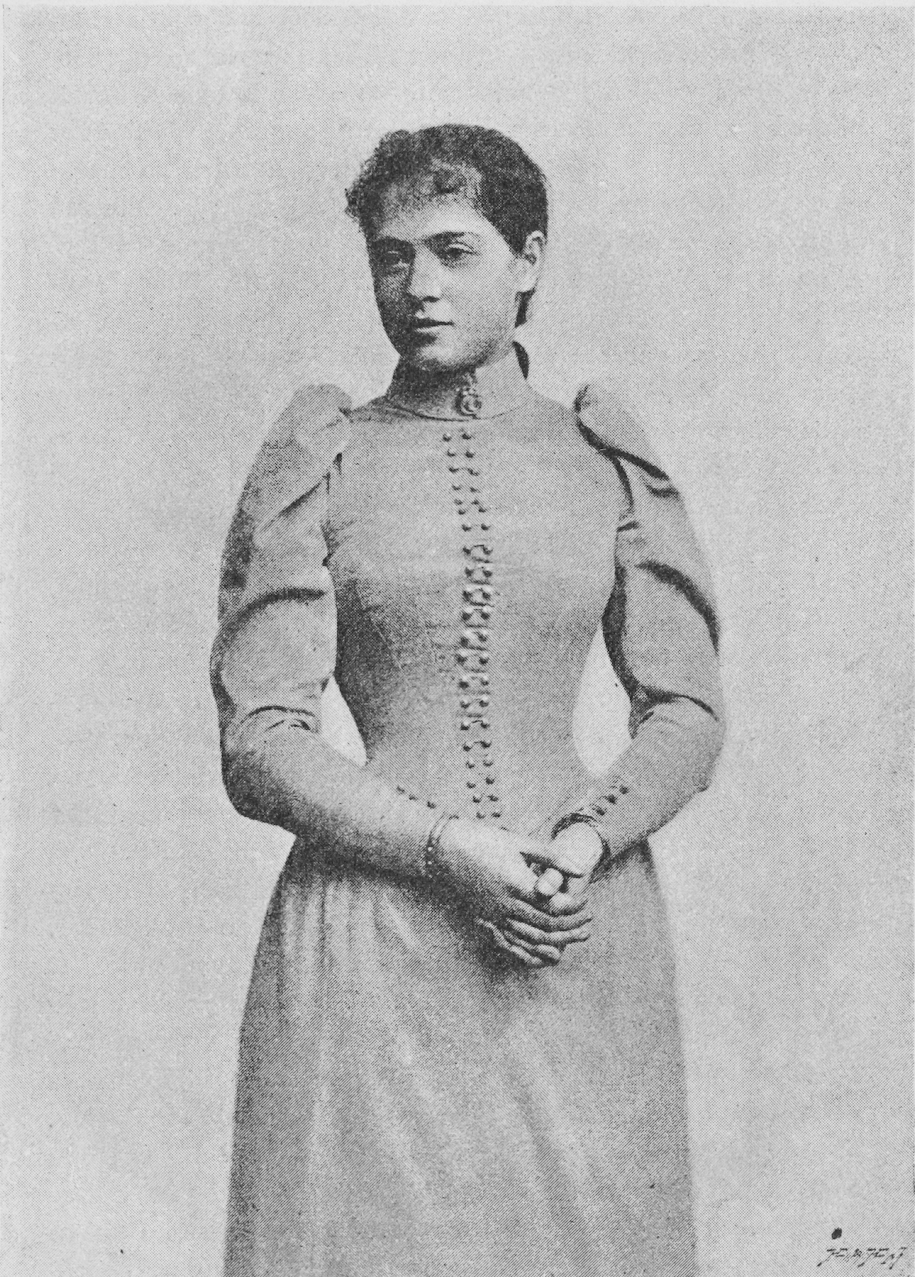
- Portrait in Prague, 1892

Background information
- Born: Zofia Maria Poznańska; 25 September 1870; Vilnius, Russian Empire
- Died: 3 September 1947 (aged 76) Milanówek, Poland
- Education: Saint Petersburg Conservatory
- Instrument: piano
- Years active: 1891–1947
- Spouse: Jerzy Rabcewicz (m. 1893; died 1930)
- Award: Order of Polonia Restituta

Zofia Maria Rabcewicz (Polish pronunciation: [ˈzɔfja rapˈt͡sɛvit͡ʂ]; /rɑːptsɛvɪtʃ/ rahp-TSEV-itch; née Poznańska; 7 October [O.S. 25 September] 1870 – 3 September 1947) was a Polish pianist and teacher. A pupil of Anton Rubinstein at the Saint Petersburg Conservatory, she toured Russia, Germany, and Austria to critical acclaim in the early 1890s. She largely retired from the concert platform after her marriage in 1893. She resumed performing around the end of World War I and settled permanently in Warsaw in 1918, later appearing frequently on Polish Radio.

She taught at the Warsaw Conservatory beginning in 1922, and she served as a juror at the first three editions of the International Chopin Piano Competition. She was a noted interpreter of Frédéric Chopin, whose 1932 recordings have attracted scholarly analysis. During the Nazi occupation of Poland she gave more than 60 clandestine concerts. Once called the "doyenne of Polish pianists", she was posthumously awarded the Commander's Cross of the Order of Polonia Restituta.

== Early life and education ==
Rabcewicz was born in Vilnius, then part of the Vilna Governorate of the Russian Empire, on 7 October 1870 to Amilia (née Keller) and Kazimierz Poznański. The family moved to Saint Petersburg when she was three years old. She began studying music at the Conservatory of the Imperial Music Society in St Petersburg in 1877 with Iosif Borovka.

In 1884, she gained a scholarship to study piano under Anton Rubinstein, a distinction considered "very unusual" for a non-Russian. She graduated on 31 May 1890, playing Rubinstein's Concerto in D minor at her graduation concert, for which she received a distinction. She was also awarded two pianos, one by the Russian manufacturer C. M. Schröder, and another by J. Becker.

== Career ==
Rabcewicz began touring Russia, Germany, and Austria in 1891 to critical acclaim. The Russian leg took her to Moscow, Kyiv, Odessa, Riga, and Vilnius, and she reached Berlin, Dresden, Leipzig, Budapest, Vienna, and Prague that autumn. At a performance in Berlin, one critic wrote that "without a doubt, a new piano genius has been born." She performed in Berlin again the following year under the baton of Hans von Bülow. After a performance in Dresden, the music critic Bernhard Vogel announced that "with her performance of the Concerto in F minor... she surpassed all the female pianists who had performed this work during the previous six years."

She made her debut in Warsaw on 29 March 1892 to great acclaim. After marrying the following year, Rabcewicz largely withdrew from the public eye to raise children and manage her household. Her husband objected to her performing in public, and their children later recalled the domestic quarrels this caused. In 1896, she taught a piano class at the Saint Petersburg Conservatory, succeeding the late Anton Rubinstein. She gave up the post after a few months, citing family reasons. She performed only sporadically until the end of World War I, during which she delivered charity concerts for Polish families.

=== Warsaw and teaching ===
In October 1918, at the conclusion of the war, the family left for Poland and settled permanently in Warsaw. She was performing in the city again by November of that year and went on to appear in all the larger cities of the newly independent state. She played regularly before the microphones of Polish Radio. In Warsaw, she performed the music of Frédéric Chopin and collaborated with notable violinists and cellists as part of symphony and chamber music concerts.

Rabcewicz began teaching as a distinguished professor at the Warsaw Conservatory and the Wysocki School of Music in 1922. She taught until 1928, and her notable students included Tomasz Kiesewetter, Maria Strakacz, and Stanisław Chojecki. She withdrew from teaching after the death of her eldest son in 1927. She served on the inaugural jury for the I International Chopin Piano Competition in Warsaw in 1927 and again for the subsequent competitions in 1932 and 1937. She was the only woman on the fourteen-member jury in 1927.

=== Repertoire and recordings ===
In 1932, she recorded a number of Chopin pieces that were subsequently compiled on Muza PNCD 300, The Golden Age of Polish Pianists. According to the musicologist Nicholas Cook:

There are features in her 1932 recording that feed into the later phrase arching style: a smoothness of dynamic control, and an even, uncluttered style of playing against which the passages of rhetorical emphasis stand out.

— Nicholas Cook

In September 1935, she sailed for New York aboard the MS Piłsudski on the liner's maiden transatlantic crossing, traveling with her son-in-law Aleksander Leszczyński, the managing director of the shipping line that operated the vessel. During a stop in Copenhagen, she gave a program of Polish music that was broadcast from the ship by Danish radio. The American tour was poorly organized and ended in failure, and her only concert there was given in a studio of the NBC Radio Network. Her diaries from the voyage are held by the Fryderyk Chopin Institute in Warsaw.

Her repertoire reportedly consisted of the entire works of Chopin and Schumann, as well as most of Beethoven's sonatas. It also encompassed composers ranging from Bach to Schubert, Liszt to Rachmaninoff, and Eugen d'Albert to Anatoly Lyadov. In particular, she promoted the works of Polish composers including Stanisław Moniuszko, Michał Kleofas Ogiński, Aleksander Zarzycki, Zygmunt Noskowski, Ignacy Jan Paderewski, Franciszek Brzeziński, Henryk Melcer-Szczawiński, Karol Szymanowski, Juliusz Zarębski, and Ludomir Różycki. Contemporaries credited her with absolute pitch and a memory that allowed her to play dozens of works on request.

The film Róża, released in 1936, includes some of the only footage of Rabcewicz playing piano. Her hands are seen playing the Revolutionary etude in a scene where Lena Żelichowska acts as the pianist Maria.

=== World War II and later years ===
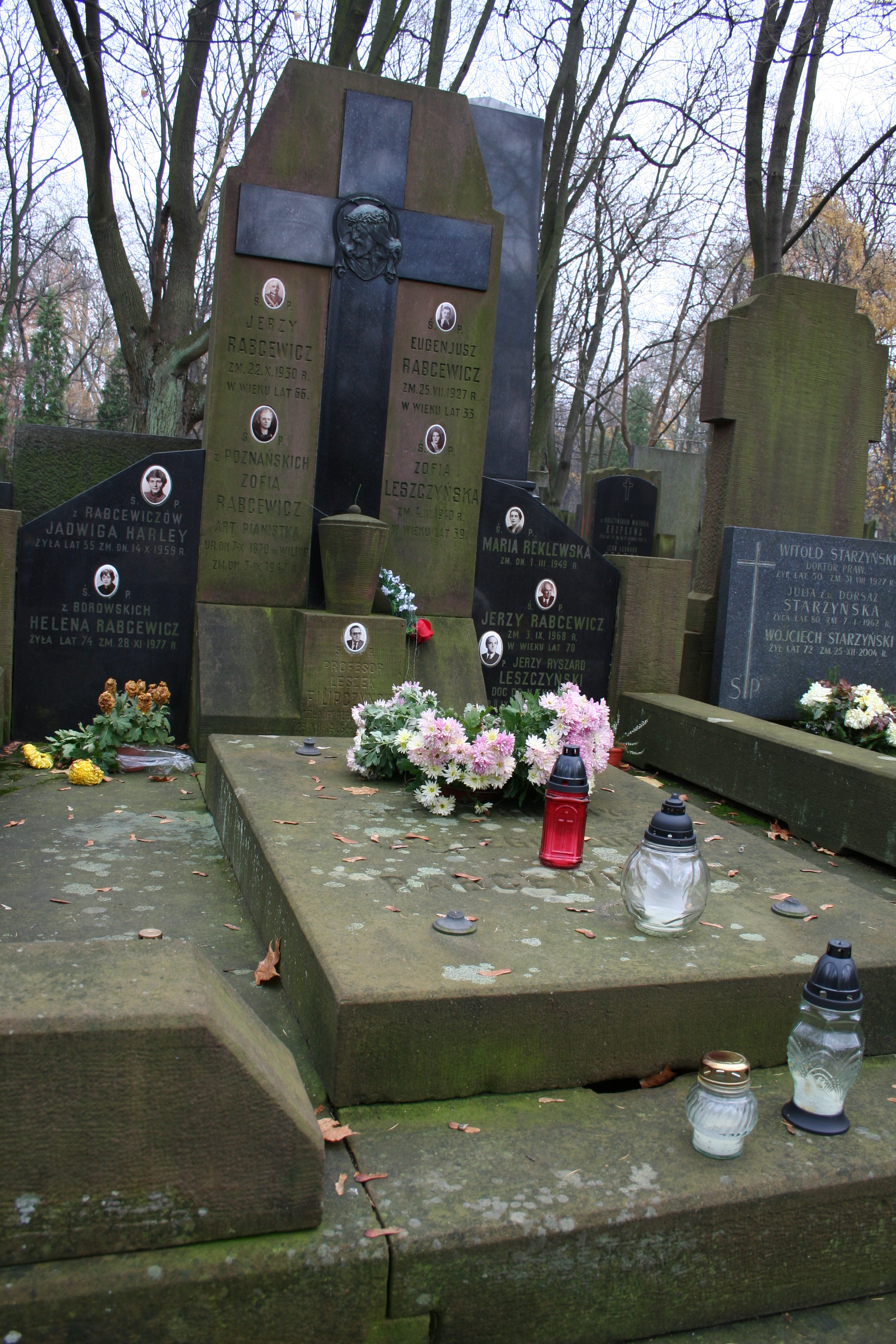
Grave at Powązki Cemetery in Warsaw

During the occupation of Poland, she gave more than 60 underground concerts. She held them between November 1940 and June 1944 in the Warsaw apartment of her daughter Maria Reklewska, playing to audiences of 100 to 120 people who paid what they wished for tickets. Listeners refrained from applauding for fear of drawing the attention of the Germans, who prohibited such gatherings. Her own apartment on Marszałkowska Street burned in August 1944 after the outbreak of the Warsaw Uprising, destroying the two grand pianos she had won on graduating from the conservatory.

In September 1945 she gave an acclaimed performance of Chopin's Concerto in F minor, and on 25 August 1946 she inaugurated the International Chopin Festival in Duszniki-Zdrój. She appeared there alongside Henryk Sztompka. She gave her last performance, a recital of Chopin for the Polish Radio, on 2 July 1947.

I truly understood the greatness of her art only in the final period of her life. She played, among other things, the immortal Sonata in B-flat minor. She played it flawlessly. Apart from that, it seemed that there was nothing extraordinary in her interpretation. But it was precisely in this simplicity of expression that everything was contained—the ideal harmony of Chopin's beauty.

— Zbigniew Drzewiecki

Rabcewicz died on 3 September 1947 in Milanówek, aged 76. Three days later, on the motion of the Minister of Culture and Art, she was posthumously awarded the Commander's Cross of the Order of Polonia Restituta for outstanding and long-standing artistic activity. She is buried with her husband at the Powązki Cemetery in Warsaw.

== Recordings ==
- Étude Op. 10, No. 12, Chopin, soundtrack for the film Róża (1936)
- Ballade No. 2, Chopin, Odeon O 217129 (1932)
- Ballade No. 2, Chopin, Muza XL 0157- 0160 (1932)
- Mazurka in C major, Op. 56, No. 2, Chopin, Odeon O 217129 (1932)
- Mazurka in C sharp minor, Op. 63, No. 3, Chopin, Odeon O 217129 (1932)
- Waltz in C-sharp minor, Op. 64, No. 2, Chopin, Odeon O 217129 (1932)

== Personal life ==
In early 1893, she married Jerzy Rabcewicz, an engineer six years her senior who after 1918 served as an officer in the Polish Army. Their children included Eugeniusz, born later that year, along with Maria, Zofia, and Jerzy. Eugeniusz died of a congenital heart condition in 1927 at the age of 33, and her husband died three years after that. Her son-in-law Aleksander Leszczyński was shot dead in September 1939, and her daughter Zofia died of a stroke half a year later. She had five grandchildren, several of whom she taught to play the piano.

She was the great-aunt of Polish actress Alina Janowska. She was also the great-grandmother of Polish writer Krzysztof Logan Tomaszewski.
