= Henryk Sztompka =

Polish pianist (1901–1964)

- Portrait in 1938
- Born: 1 April 1901; Bogusławka, Volhynia Governorate, Russian Empire
- Died: 21 June 1964 (aged 63); Kraków, Poland
- Education: University of Warsaw; Warsaw Conservatory
- Occupation: Pianist
- Years active: 1926–1964
- Awards: Order of Polonia Restituta; Order of the Banner of Labour; Cross of Merit

Henryk Sztompka (/ʃtɒmpkɑː/ SHTOMP-kah; Polish: [ˈxɛnrɨk ˈʂtɔmpka]; April 1 [O.S. March 19] 1901 – 21 June 1964) was a Polish pianist. He studied at the Warsaw Conservatory under Józef Turczyński and later trained in Paris under Ignacy Jan Paderewski from 1928 to 1932. He competed in the first International Chopin Piano Competition in 1927, winning the Polish Radio award for the best performance of mazurkas.

He toured widely across Poland, Western Europe, and the Soviet Union, and also became known for bringing recitals to rural audiences. After World War II, he taught at the Academy of Music in Kraków and recorded the complete Nocturnes and Mazurkas of Chopin in 1957.

Sztompka helped establish the Chopin Festival in Duszniki in 1946 and repeatedly served on the juries of the International Chopin Piano Competition, the Long-Thibaud-Crespin Competition, and the International Tchaikovsky Competition. He served as vice president of the Frederic Chopin Society until his death.

== Early life and education ==
Sztompka was born in 1901 in Bogusławka, a village in the Volhynia Governorate of northwestern Ukraine near the city of Lutsk, then part of the Russian Empire. His parents were Józefa (née Wiązowski; d. 1918) and Stanisław Sztompka (d. 1930). He graduated from the St. Stanisław Kostka gymnasium in 1920 and served in the 36th Infantry Regiment of the Academic Legion. He attended the University of Warsaw in 1921 for a year to study philosophy.

He studied piano under Antoni Sygietyński at the Warsaw Music Institute and later attended the Warsaw Conservatory. There, he studied under Józef Turczyński and graduated with honors in 1926. He moved to Paris in 1928 to begin his international performing career, studying under Ignacy Jan Paderewski until 1932.

== Career ==
On 24 October 1926, Sztompka made his debut performance of Rachmaninoff's Piano Concerto No. 2 with the Warsaw Philharmonic. He competed in the inaugural International Chopin Piano Competition in 1927, and as a Polish contestant, was initially favored to win. Although the 1st place prize went to Lev Oborin, Sztompka won the Polish Radio award for the best performance of mazurkas.

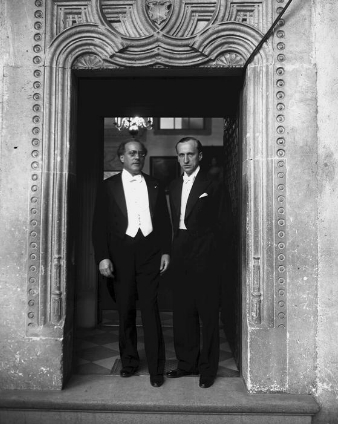
Sztompka with conductor Grzegorz Fitelberg at Wawel Castle (1937)

After moving to France, he made his Paris debut as a soloist at the Salle Pleyel. He also corresponded with the music critic Marc Pincherle. After studying with Paderewski, Sztompka performed with an orchestra in Paris for the first time on 24 January 1932, playing Paderewski's Polish Fantasy with the Colonne Orchestra under the baton of Gabriel Pierné. Later that year, he began performing concerts across Poland, Western Europe, and the Soviet Union. He made his first appearance in London on 9 March 1934, playing Chopin at Grotrian Hall.

Sztompka performed in Poland with Karol Szymanowski and accompanied vocal artists including Ewa Bandrowska-Turska, Stanisława Korwin-Szymanowska, Jan Kiepura, and the violinist Eugenia Umińska. He was part of a program that introduced people in rural Poland to classical music. Sztompka "claimed to prefer the audiences in the provinces to those of major cities", remarking that in rural areas:

We feel needed by everyone, by the people of all of Poland, and not only by a small handful of snobs and by the even fewer who are truly devoted to music.

— Henryk Sztompka

In 1936, he joined the Conservatory of the Pomeranian Music Society in Toruń, Poland, as a piano teacher. There, he taught pianist Regina Smendzianka.

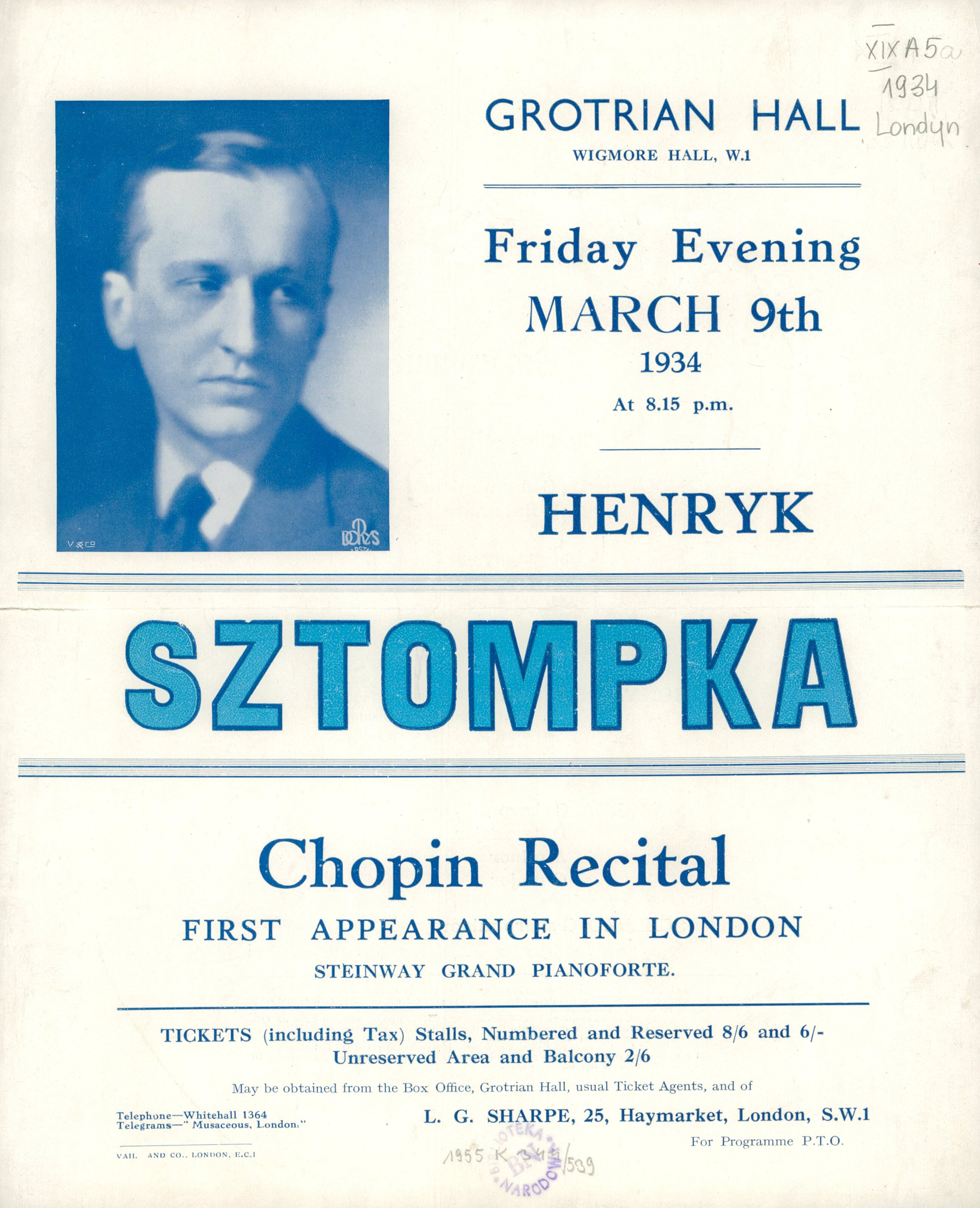
Poster for recital at Grotrian Hall in London (1934)

His musical career was interrupted by Nazi Germany's Invasion of Poland in 1939. After the end of the war in Europe, Sztompka gave a recital on 4 September to raise money to rebuild the Holy Cross Church in Warsaw. He played Chopin's Piano Sonata No. 2 (Funeral March) on the composer's own piano, followed by Polonaise in A-flat major, Op. 53. The audience included members of the "Blue Squadron", a group of French Red Cross nurses and ambulance drivers who worked in Poland after the war, including Madeleine Pauliac. Together with Zofia Rabcewicz, he took part in establishing the Chopin Festival in Duszniki in 1946 and performed at the 2nd festival the following year.

Sztompka resumed his activity and began teaching piano at the Academy of Music in Kraków. He became an associate professor in 1955 and attained tenure three years later. In 1957, he became head of the piano department and served as vice rector until 1963. He was a noted interpreter of Chopin and recorded the complete set of Nocturnes and Mazurkas in 1957 for the Polskie Nagrania Muza label. Sztompka's style was described as a "predominantly lyrical performer".

Sztompka was on the jury for the International Chopin Piano Competition three times, including the fourth competition in 1949, the fifth competition 1955, and vice-chaired the sixth competition in 1960. He was on the jury of the Long-Thibaud-Crespin Competition four times between 1953 and 1961 and twice on the jury of the International Tchaikovsky Competition, including for its inaugural edition in 1958. He later served as vice president of the Frederic Chopin Society.

His most notable students include the pianist Regina Smendzianka, composer Andrzej Kurylewicz, and Iranian pianist Tania Achot-Haroutounian, who won the 3rd prize in the VI International Chopin Piano Competition in 1960. Other students include Joachim Gudel and Maria Korecka-Soszkowska.

== Personal life ==
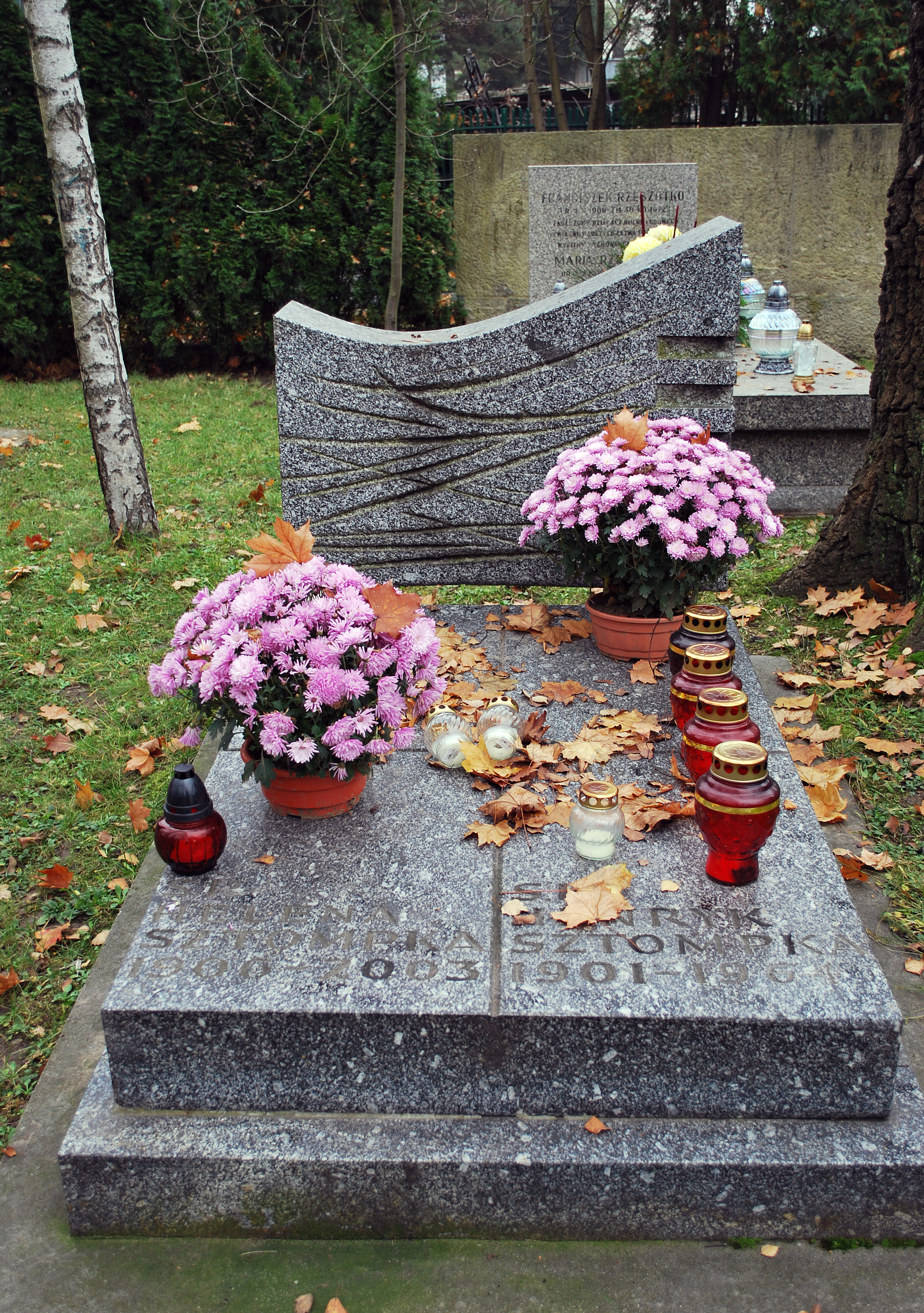
Burial place at Rakowicki Cemetery

Sztompka married Helena (née Zakrzewski) in 1938. Their son, Piotr Sztompka, became a Polish sociologist.

After the Warsaw Uprising in 1944, he and his wife and infant son received shelter from Władysław Strakacz, the owner of a brewery in Skierniewice. The brewer brought Sztompka a piano so that he could continue practicing during the occupation.

Sztompka died in Kraków on 21 June 1964, aged 63. He was buried in the Avenue of the Meritorious at the Rakowicki Cemetery.

== Awards ==
- City of Kraków Award (1958)
- Commander's Cross with Star, Order of Polonia Restituta (28 April 1955)
- State Artistic Award, 1st degree (1950)
- Order of the Banner of Labour 2nd class (22 July 1949)
- Gold Cross of Merit (11 November 1937)

== Publications ==
- Artur Rubinstein. Polish Musical Publishing House (PWM Edition). Kraków (1966)
- Konkursowe refleksje (English: Reflections on the competition). Dziennik Polski; issue 13 (1955)
