= Manser =

Manser is a surname. Notable people with the surname include:

- Anthony Manser (1924–1995), British philosopher
- Bruno Manser (1954–presumably 2000), Swiss anthropologist and activist
- Harry Manser (1874–1955), justice of the Maine Supreme Judicial Court
- Kevin Manser (1929–2001), Australian actor
- Leslie Manser (1922–1942), British bomber pilot
- Michael Manser (1929–2016), British architect
- Pauline Manser (born 1969), Australian volleyball coach
- Riaan Manser (born 1973), South African explorer
- Robert Manser (1880–1955), English first-class cricketer
- Thérès Manser (born 1956), Swiss sport shooter

== See also ==
- Cecil Victor Manser (1914–1997), better known as Charlie Chester, English comedian and TV and radio presenter
- Manser Marmion (1404–?), English politician
