= Villem Reimann =

Estonian composer

Villem Reimann (19 March 1906 – 8 June 1992) was an Estonian composer and pedagogue.

Reimann was born in 1906 in Pärnu. From 1925 to 1927 he studied piano in Tallinn Conservatory. In 1933 he graduated from Tallinn Conservatory in composition speciality under instructor Artur Kapp, and in 1936 in piano specialty under Artur Lemba.

From 1942 to 1992 he was a pedagogue of music theory subjects and chamber music in Estonian Academy of Music and Theatre.

Since 1944 he was a member of Estonian Composers' Union.

Reimann died in 1992 in Tallinn.

== Awards and honors ==
- Estonian SSR State Prize (1949)
- Stalin Prize, 2nd class (1951) – for music to the documentary film Soviet Estonia
- Honored Art Worker of the Estonian SSR (1955)
- Order of the Red Banner of Labour (1956)
