= Jadwiga Sarnecka =

Polish composer and pianist (1877 or 1883–1913)

Jadwiga Sarnecka (1877 or 1883 – 29 December 1913) was a Polish composer and pianist whose composition Ballade for piano won second place in a 1910 competition in Lviv (today in Ukraine) commemorating Chopin’s centenary. She also composed works for voice and piano.

== Biography ==
Sarnecka was born in Slavuta, Volhynia (today in Ukraine). She studied piano with Felicjan Szopski and Władysław Żeleński in Krakow, Poland; Henryk Melcer-Szczawinski and Aleksander Michalowski in Warsaw; and Theodor Leschetizky in Vienna. She presented piano recitals throughout Austria, Germany and Poland.

Sarnecka’s compositions were not always favorably reviewed. She self-published her initial works. Arts patron Feliks Jasienski (pseudonym “Manggha”) (1861-1929) funded the publication of subsequent works. Eventually, Sarnecka’s compositions received favorable reviews from Polish music critics Adolf Chybinski, Zdzislaw Jachimecki, and Jozef Wladyslaw Reiss, and A. Piwarski & Company began publishing them. After winning second prize at the Lwów (Lviv) competition in 1910, Sarnecka was the only woman asked to present a paper at the first Congress of Polish Musicians later that year. She wrote about Creativity vs Virtuosity in Musical Composition.

Sarnecka died from tuberculosis in Krakow in 1913. Her work has been recorded commercially by Marek Szlezer on the DUX Records label. Her music is currently published by Polish Music Editions. Her compositions include:

== Piano ==
- Cinq Morceaux, opus 7
- Etude in f minor
- Fantasia
- Four Impressions, opus
- Intermezzo
- Miniatures
- Seven Ballads
- Sonata No. 1, opus 9
- Sonata No. 2
- Thirteen Impressions
- Two Studies
- Variations

== Vocal ==
- "Lux in Tenebris" (text by Sarnecka; dedicated to Helene de Galezowska)
- Song (text by Zygmunt Krasiński)
- "Szumny wichrze gluchych pol" (alternate title: Vent qui cours la plaine; text by Lucjan Rydel; dedicated to Count Henryk Tyszkiewicz)
- "Tenebrae" (text by Sarnecka; dedicated to Mademoiselle la Baronne Casimire Blazowska)
