= Linzer =

Linzer is a surname. Notable people with the surname include:

- Anna Linzer, American novelist and non-profit management consultant
- Dafna Linzer (born 1970), American journalist
- Daniel I. Linzer (born 1954), American molecular biologist and academic administrator
- Dov Linzer (born 1966), American Open Orthodox rabbi
- Drew Linzer, American professor of political science from Emory University
- Michael Linzer (born 1989), Austrian professional tennis player
- Sandy Linzer (born 1941), American songwriter, lyricist, and record producer

== See also ==
- Linz, the third-largest city of Austria
- Linzer Aach, river in Linzgau, Baden-Württemberg, Germany
- Linzer Klangwolke, open-air annual multimedia musical event in Linz
- Linzer Landestheater, a theatre in Linz, Austria
- Linzer torte, an Austrian torte with a lattice design on top of the pastry
- Linzer Orgeltabulatur, emblematic organ tablature of the early baroque era
- Linzer Sanden, geologic formation in Austria
- Linzer Stadion, multi-purpose stadium, in Linz, Austria
