= Manggha =

Art museum in Kraków

”Manggha” Museum of Japanese Art and Technology
- Muzeum Sztuki i Techniki Japońskiej „Manggha”
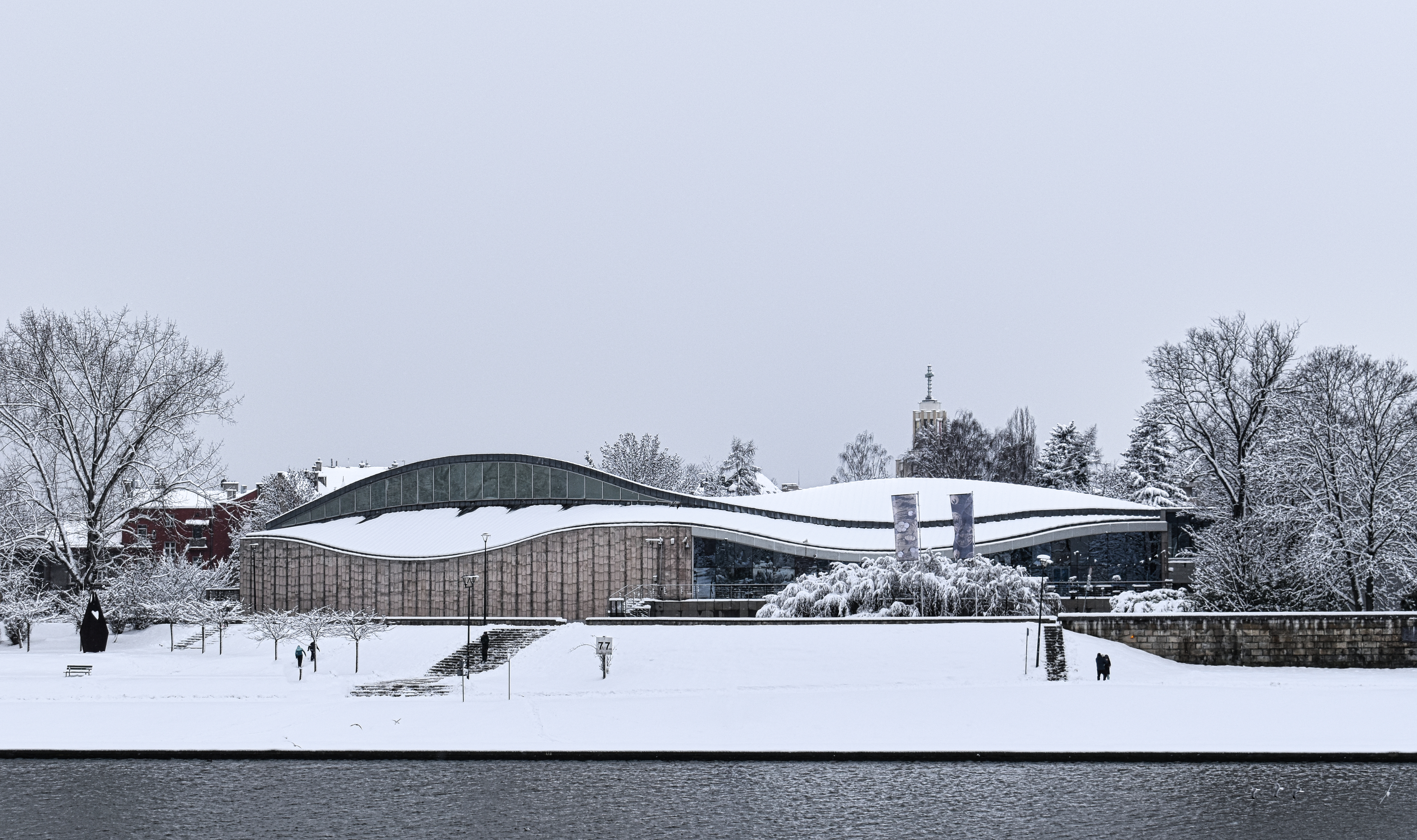
- Established: 1965
- Location: 26 M. Konopnickiej Street; Kraków; Poland
- Coordinates: 50°03′04″N 19°55′54″E
- Type: Art museum
- Website: https://manggha.pl/en

”Manggha” Museum of Japanese Art and Technology (Polish: Muzeum Sztuki i Techniki Japońskiej „Manggha”) is a museum located at 26 M. Konopnickiej Street in the district of Dębniki, in Kraków, Poland. Until 2005, it was a branch of the National Museum of Kraków.

== History ==
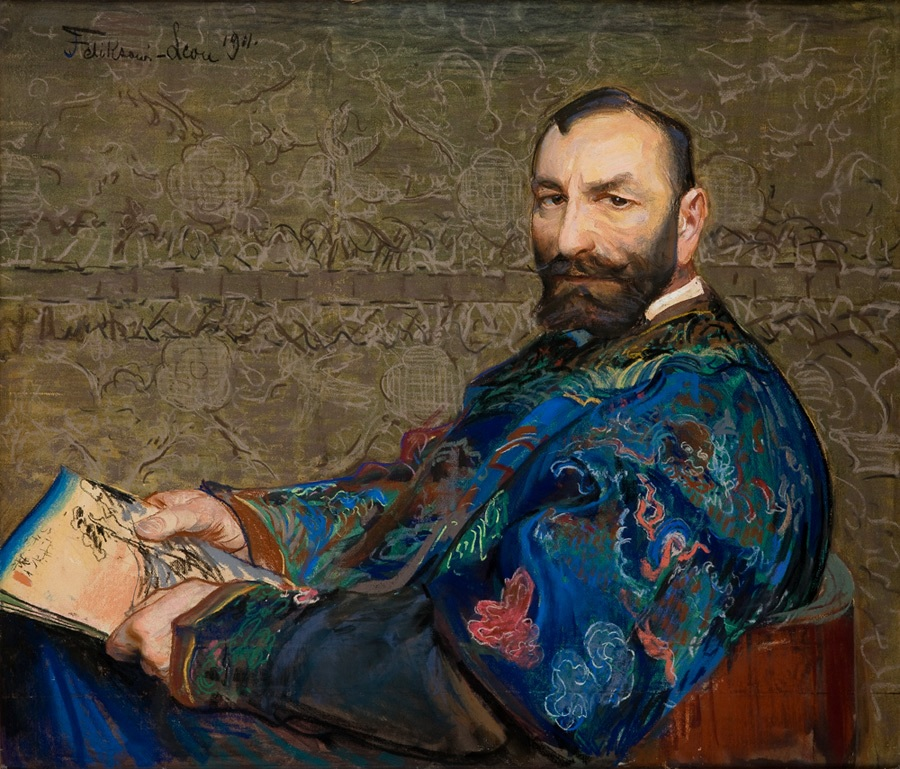
Feliks Jasieński aka "Manggha", the founder of the collection (Portrait by Leon Wyczółkowski, 1911)

In 1920, Feliks Jasieński—critic, writer and collector of art, whose penname was "Manggha"—donated his collection of artworks connected with Japan to the National Museum in Kraków. He was a patron of the arts who also helped composers such as Jadwiga Sarnecka publish their works. After his death, the museum’s collection was not exhibited, one reason being the lack of space to arrange the 6500 items. The lone exception was an exhibition in Cloth Hall of Kraków in 1944, organised by the Germans, who occupied Poland at the time. A young Andrzej Wajda saw the exhibition and became fascinated by Japanese art.

In 1987, almost half a century later, Andrzej Wajda received a film award in Kyoto Prize. He decided to donate the entire sum to the National Museum in Kraków to build a brand new building in which to exhibit the entire collection.

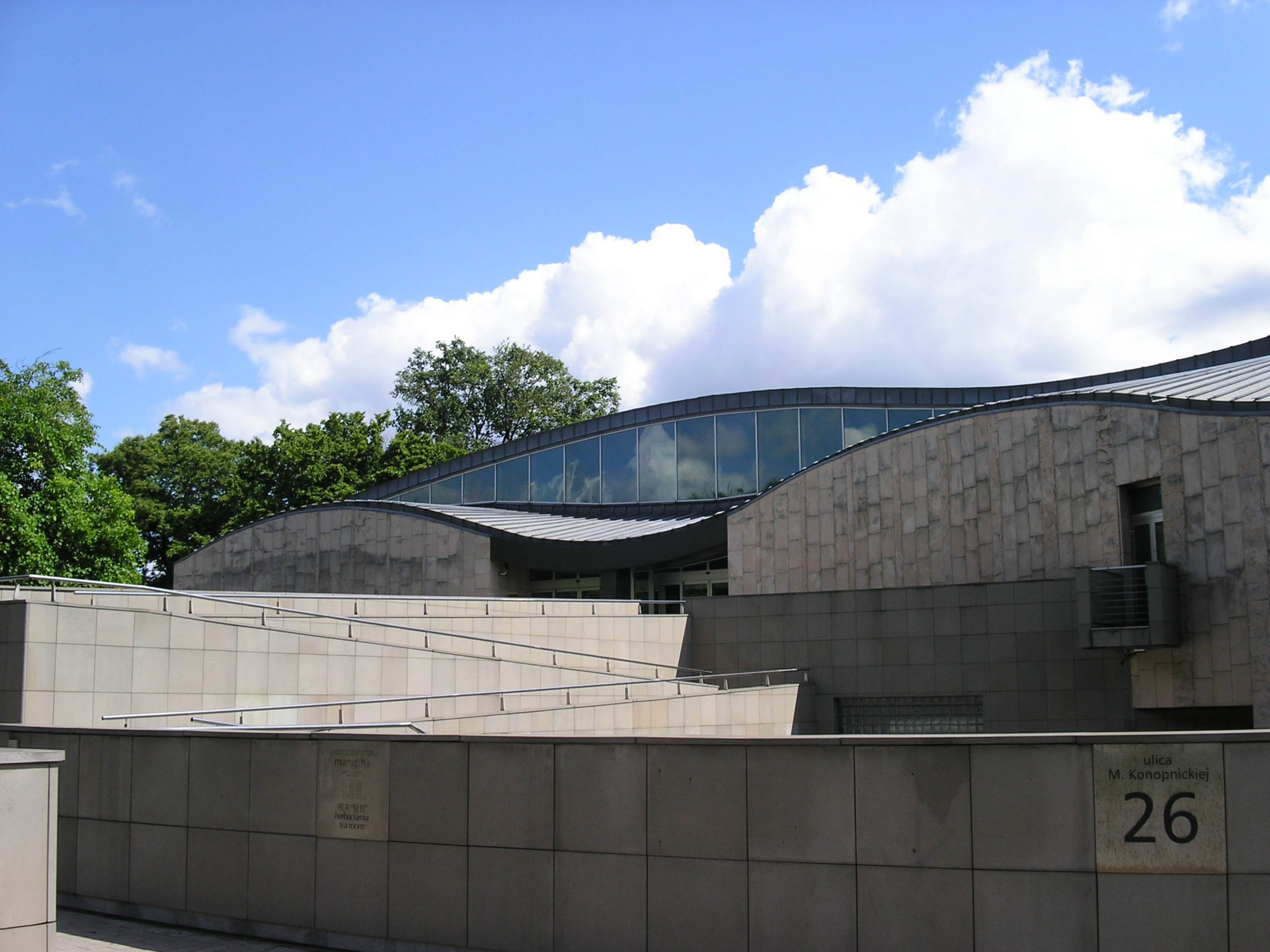
Manggha Museum of Japanese Art and Technology

Andrzej Wajda was supported by local authorities, the city, and the government of Japan with special help from ambassador Nagao Hyodo. The East Japan Railway Workers' Union with president Akira Matsuzaki donated the equivalent of approximately $1MM U.S. to the Kyoto-Kraków Foundation created by Andrzej Wajda and friends.

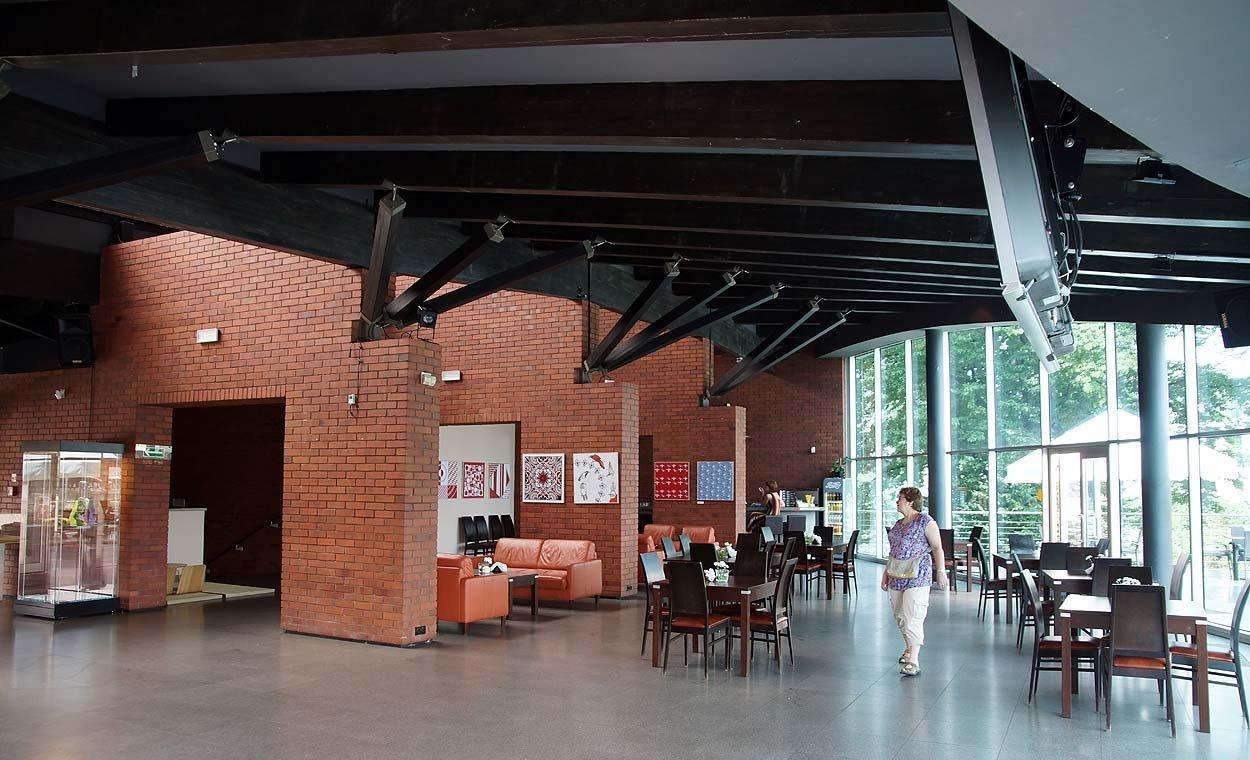
View of the lobby

The building was designed by the Pritzker Prize-winning Japanese architect Arata Isozaki, who donated the design to the foundation. Krzysztof Ingarden, J.Ewy and JET Atelier were collaborating architects on the Polish side. Manggha was opened on November 30, 1994.

In 1997, Manggha received a Special Award of the Japanese Foundation.

On July 11, 2002, the museum was visited by Emperor Akihito and Empress Michiko. On the request of the emperor, an exhibition of selected woodcuts of the great Japanese artist Utagawa Hiroshige had been prepared. The imperial couple donated some audio-visual equipment to the centre's school of Japanese language.

In a 2006 architectural competition, the centre was chosen as one of twenty most interesting examples of architecture in Poland built after 1989. - "Polska. Ikony architektury" ("Poland. Icons of Architecture").

== Architecture ==
The exterior features of this modern building—the roof resembles the sea in many old Japanese paintings—echo both the museum's surroundings and some of the art housed within; the garden next to the building is a gift of the city of Kyoto. It is a contemporary structure that both complements and contrasts with the ancient art of Japan, and contains both exhibition and conference rooms. In addition to its permanent exhibitions, the Centre organises temporary ones—mostly relating to Japanese art, culture and technology. In addition, the centre organises courses in Japanese tea ceremony, ikebana, and Japanese language. Manggha is the headquarters of the Polish Bonsai Club.

== See also ==
- Culture of Kraków
- National Museum, Kraków
