= C. M. Schröder =

Russian piano manufacturer, 1818–1918

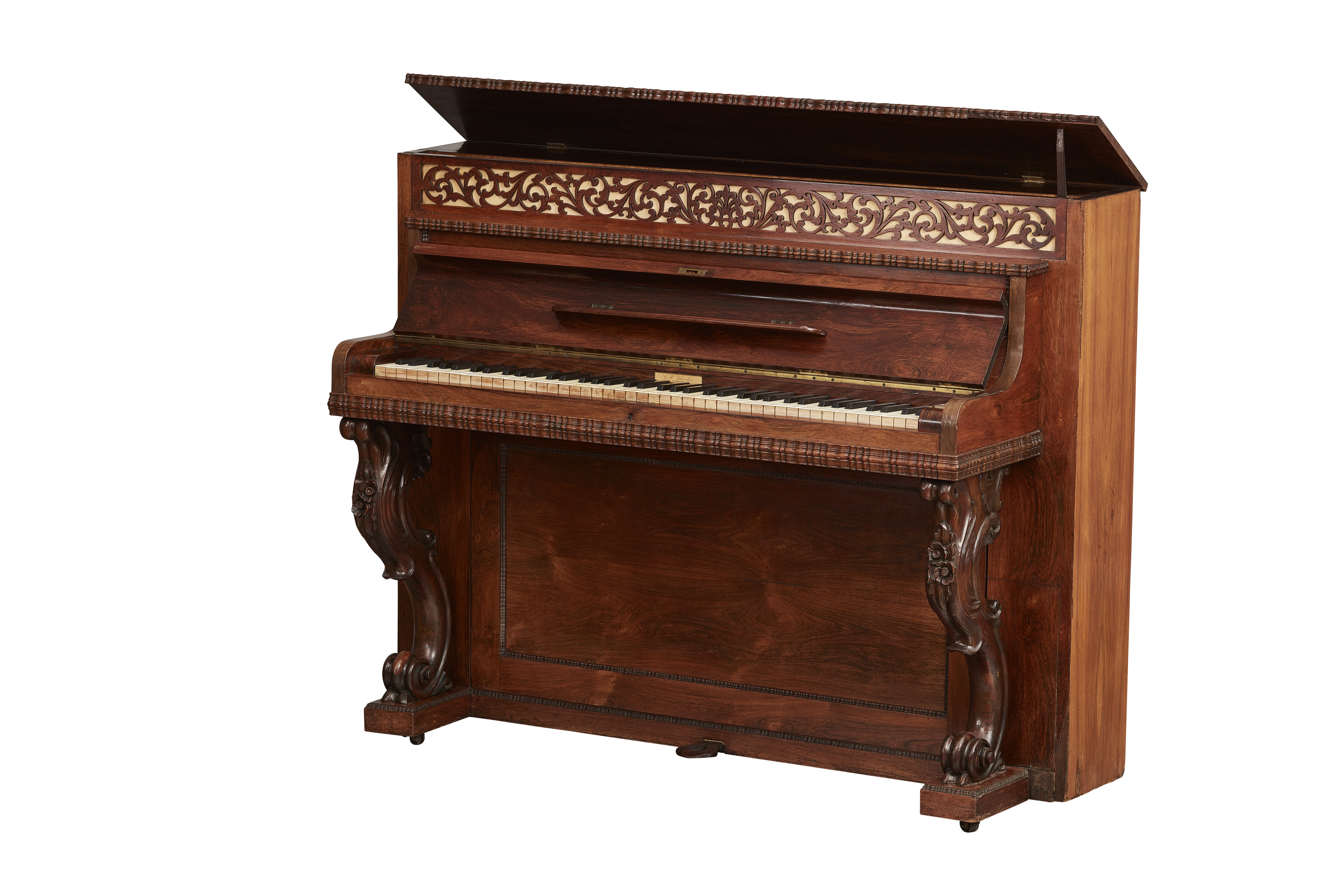
- Schröder upright piano made c. 1857
- Native name: К. М. Шредер
- Type: Private
- Industry: Musical instrument manufacturing
- Founded: 1818
- Founder: Johann Friedrich Schröder
- Defunct: 1918
- Fate: Nationalised by the Soviet authorities; piano production ceased in 1924
- Successor: First State Piano Factory; Lunacharsky Musical Instrument Factory
- Headquarters: Saint Petersburg, Russia
- Key people: Carl Michael Schröder; Carl Nicolai Schröder
- Products: Grand pianos, upright pianos, square pianos
- Number of employees: 340 (1913)

C. M. Schröder (Russian: К. М. Шредер), which operated after 1876 as the First Russian Steam Piano Factory K. M. Schröder and after 1903 as the Trading House "K. M. Schröder", was a piano manufacturer in Saint Petersburg.

Founded in 1818 by the German-born craftsman Johann Friedrich Schröder (1785–1852) and greatly expanded by his son Carl Michael Schröder (1828–1889), it became the largest piano manufacturer in the Russian Empire and one of the very few Russian makers to win sustained recognition abroad. Schröder pianos were awarded annually to the top graduates of the Saint Petersburg Conservatory, including Sergei Prokofiev in 1914.

The firm held appointments as purveyor to the imperial courts of Russia, Austria and Germany and to the kings of Denmark and Bavaria, and its instruments were used by pianists including Josef Hofmann, Leopold Godowsky, Moriz Rosenthal, Camille Saint-Saëns, and Emil von Sauer. The factory was nationalised by the Soviets in July 1918, and piano manufacture ended in 1924, after which the factory was used to produce plucked string instruments.

== Foundation and workshop of J. F. Schröder ==
Johann Friedrich Schröder was born in 1785 in Stralsund, then part of Swedish Pomerania, and trained as a joiner and keyboard maker before settling in Saint Petersburg, where he worked as a journeyman for a local piano maker. He obtained his master's diploma in 1816 but was only able to open his own workshop in 1818. Until the mid-1860s, the firm's labels gave 1816 as the year of foundation, but the date was subsequently altered to 1818, the year in which Schröder was formally entered in the registers of the Saint Petersburg craft board as a musical-instrument maker.

Schröder was unrelated to the established Petersburg makers A. C. and C. R. Schröder. According to Russian music researcher and piano historian M. V. Sergeev, Schröder was obliged to continually improve his instruments in order to distinguish himself from them. His work was recognised with a public commendation at the Saint Petersburg manufactures exhibition of 1831, a small silver medal in 1839, and a further commendation in 1843. In 1834, the firm was appointed supplier to the girls' schools of the Office of the Institutions of Empress Maria. Beginning in the early 1830s, the workshop was reclassified as a factory, operating from Schröder's own house on the corner of Voznesensky Prospekt and Bolshaya Meshchanskaya (now Kazanskaya) Street. In the following decade, Schröder was elected head of the Saint Petersburg piano-makers' guild, and in 1849 he was appointed expert for keyboard instruments at the All-Russian exhibition of manufactured goods. By the early 1850s, the factory employed about forty workers and produced grand pianos, upright pianos fitted with a transposing device, and square pianos whose keyboards and actions matched those of the concert grands. Schröder died in 1852, having built rather more than 3,000 instruments in some thirty-six years.

== Expansion under Carl Michael Schröder ==
The business passed to Schröder's son Carl Michael Schröder (Russian: Karl Ivanovich Schröder; 1828 – 5 May 1889), who had been educated at the German Petrischule in Saint Petersburg, learned tuning and piano-making in his father's factory, and completed his training abroad in the Paris workshops of Jean-Henri Pape and Henri Herz and at Érard in London. Under him the firm adopted the name C. M. Schröder and introduced models it had not previously built, including concert grands, new uprights and the small роялино (royalino).

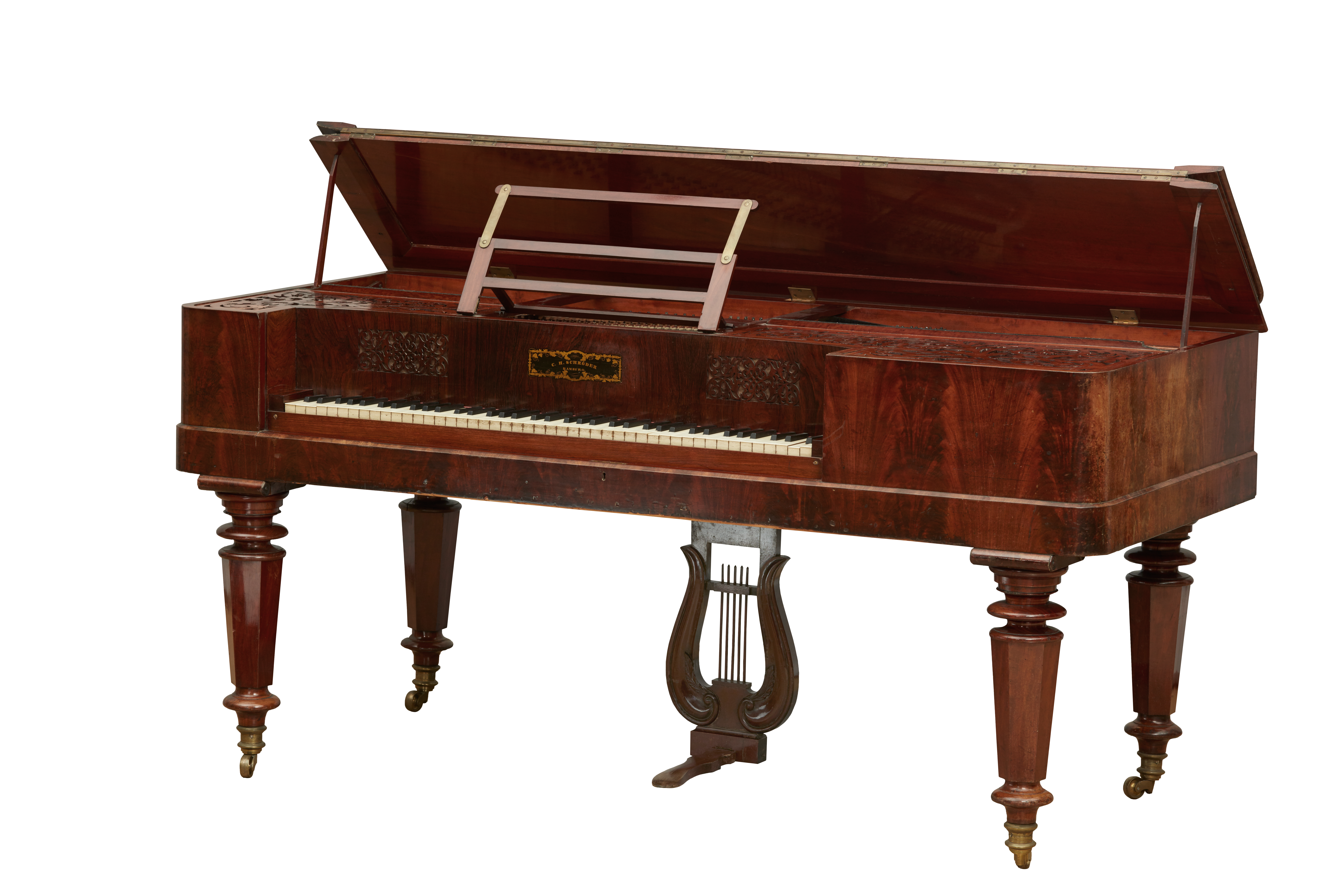
Square piano made in 1847 from rosewood and mahogany, now in the Museum of Arts and Crafts in Hamburg

Sergeev attributes the firm's technical advance in this period to a series of incremental improvements: a taller upright model with a seven-octave compass; a metal plate carrying pressed-in hitch pins to hold the strings; struts bearing against the plate and wrest plank to resist deformation of the case and loss of tuning stability; and the replacement of flat-headed tuning pins by square-headed pins imported from Germany. The firm was among the first in Russia to cast iron frames and to adopt cross-stringing with a double-repetition action.

Demand grew accordingly. Instruments were supplied to the Imperial Court Chapel and to the schools of the Maria institutions, where they were accepted personally by the inspector of music Adolf von Henselt. From the 1860s the firm worked with the Saint Petersburg Conservatory, whose instruments were bought by the Russian Musical Society, and in 1874 it became the Conservatory's official supplier. By the mid-1860s C. M. Schröder was the largest piano factory in Russia and had produced some 5,000 instruments; experts including Theodor Leschetizky praised the solidity of its workmanship, the evenness of its touch and the singing tone of its grands. In 1868, when the firm marked its fiftieth anniversary, it employed 75 workers and turned out about 200 instruments a year.

An improved cross-strung concert grand with double-repetition action was admired by Franz Liszt and was distinguished at the 1873 Vienna World's Fair; the exhibition reporter Oscar Paul judged it far superior to any other Russian instrument shown, singling out its fullness and evenness of tone and its light action. The award led to an appointment as purveyor to the German imperial court and to the conferral on Schröder of the Austrian Order of Franz Joseph.

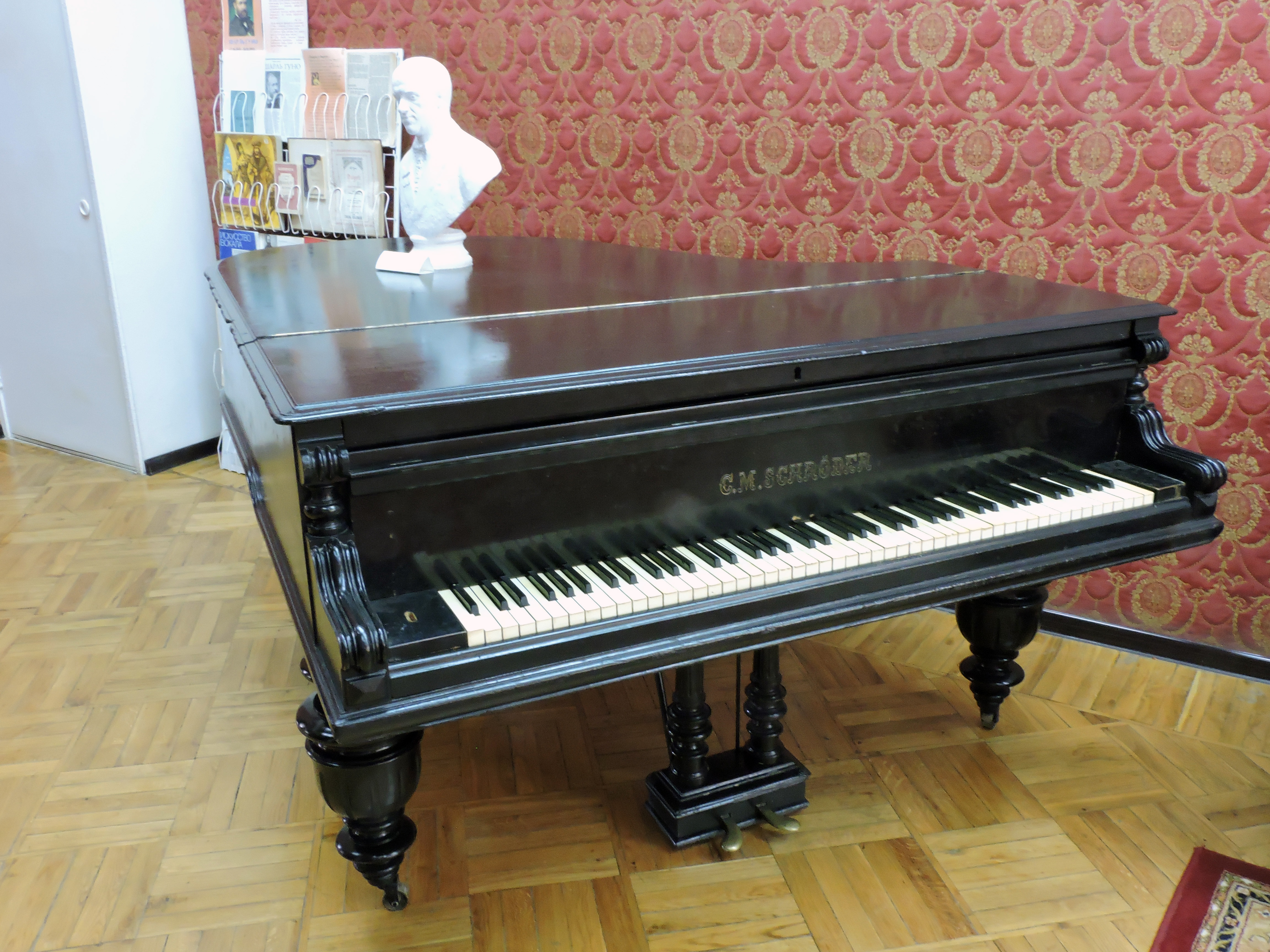
Grand piano at a library in Kharkiv, Ukraine

In 1873 the factory moved to a new site on the Petersburg Side, on a plot running from Bolshaya Vulfova Street (now Chapayeva Street) to the embankment of the Bolshaya Nevka. It was the first piano works in Russia to be driven by steam engines, and it operated its own forge, metalworking, turning, lacquering and painting shops. Celebrating the Vienna award, Schröder gave a dinner for his workforce, announced a reduction of the working day by one hour without loss of pay, and raised piece rates.

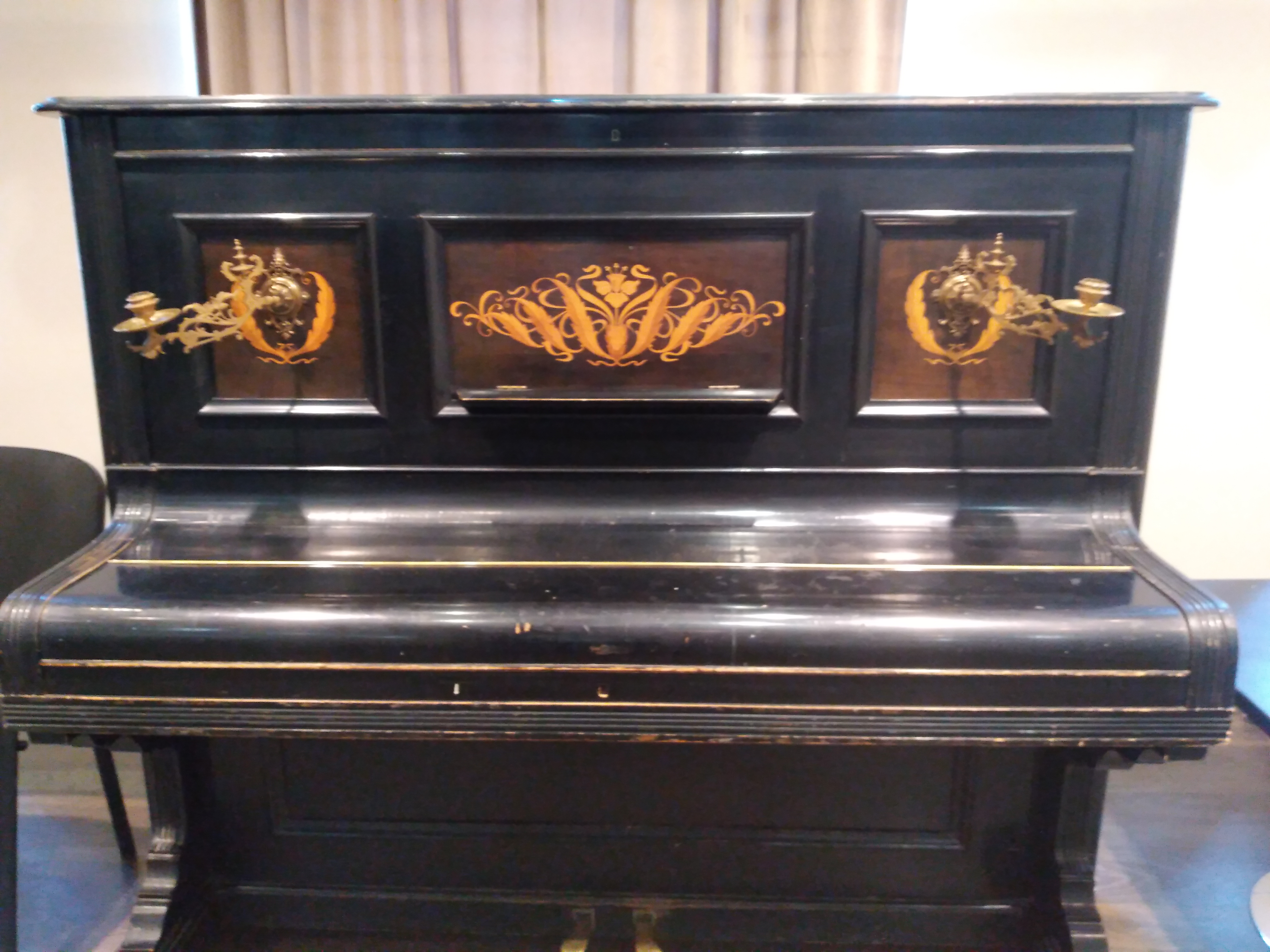
Upright piano with ornate mantle

About 1876 Schröder bought a house at Nevsky Prospekt 52, on the corner of Sadovaya Street, and installed there a showroom, a concert hall and apartments for the family; from 1876 the business traded as the First Russian Steam Piano Factory K. M. Schröder. Schröder was made a Manufactory Councillor in April 1878.

At the Paris Exposition Universelle of 1878 the jury of the musical section, which included Liszt, awarded the firm a gold medal, and Schröder was received into the Legion of Honour. The factory then employed 179 workers and produced some 500 pianos a year, its skilled men being housed in three-room company apartments. In 1880 the firm received the title of purveyor to the Russian imperial court. At the Moscow All-Russian art and industry exhibition of 1882 it showed hors concours, exhibiting among other instruments a concert grand elaborately carved in the Russian Revival style to a design by the architect Pyotr Boytsov, which was bought by Alexander III for Gatchina Palace; for it Schröder was awarded the Order of Saint Anna, 2nd class, and the Order of Saint Vladimir, 4th class.

== Later years (1889–1918) ==
Carl Michael Schröder died at Frankfurt am Main in May 1889 and was succeeded by his eldest son, Carl Nicolai Schröder (Karl Karlovich; born 1861), who had trained abroad with Friedrich Ehrbar in Vienna, John Brinsmead in London, and with leading Parisian houses. Under his direction, annual piano manufacturing output rose from about 770 to about 1,200 instruments.

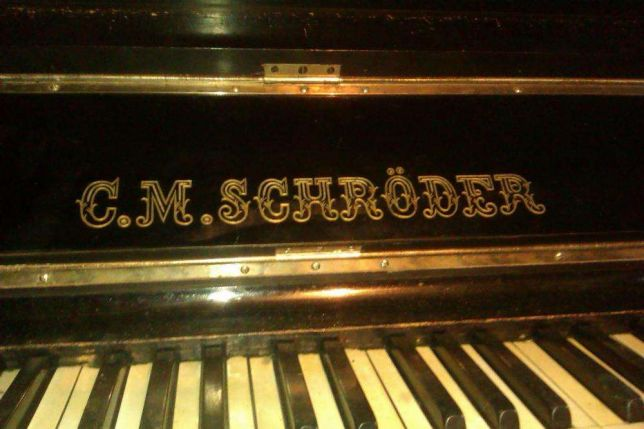
Detail of embossed signature

In 1889, the firm presented Anton Rubinstein, on the fiftieth anniversary of his career, with a Russian-style grand made to designs by the architect Vasily Schaub, an instrument later admired by Carl Bechstein. From 1890 until 1917, the firm awarded a grand piano annually to the best graduate of the piano department of the Saint Petersburg Conservatory. The recipient in 1890 was Zofia Rabcewicz, and in 1914 it was Sergei Prokofiev. In these years, the firm negotiated with a number of pianists, among them Sergei Rachmaninoff, over the status of "Schröder artist".

The brothers established the trading house "K. M. Schröder" in 1900, with branches in Warsaw and Odessa. In 1903, Carl Nicolai left the business, which passed to his younger brothers Johann and Oskar; he acquired instead the factory of the firm's long-standing rival J. Becker.

By 1909, C. M. Schröder was the largest piano manufacturer in the Russian Empire, employing 325 workers and having built more than 30,000 instruments since its foundation. Its grands were preferred by Camille Saint-Saëns, Josef Hofmann, Leopold Godowsky, Moriz Rosenthal, Alfred Grünfeld, Vasily Safonov, Emil von Sauer, and Raoul Pugno, and the two grands in its Nevsky Prospekt showroom were in constant use by Conservatory students for rehearsal. By 1912, the catalogue offered five upright and six grand models, with full iron frames and Schwander double-repetition actions; by 1913 the works employed 340 people and produced about 1,500 instruments a year.

The outbreak of the First World War was ruinous. The firm's German craftsmen were arrested and deported and the works closed. Production resumed in December 1915 on a much reduced scale, the factory turning out up to 100 instruments a year alongside delay and igniter tubes for hand grenades and parquet flooring.

== Nationalisation and successors ==
Following the October Revolution but before the end of World War I, the factory was nationalised in July 1918 by the Council of the National Economy of the Northern Region of Petrograd and renamed the First State Piano Factory. Two years later, it carried the name of the People's Commissar for Education, Anatoly Lunacharsky. The Schröder brothers were arrested more than once during the Red Terror and eventually left the Soviet Union.

Late-production upright, produced in the 1920s

Piano manufacture at the works ceased in 1924, with the machinery and stock being transferred to the Second Piano Factory, the former J. Becker works, which traded as Krasny Oktyabr. From 1926, the Schröder buildings housed the Lunacharsky factory of plucked instruments, which became the largest Soviet producer of guitars, balalaikas and domras and, later, the first Soviet manufacturer of harps in series. The Schröder model IV grand proved sufficiently successful that it was taken as the basis for the baby grands later made by Krasny Oktyabr in Leningrad and by Estonia in Tallinn.

The family mansion built for Carl Nicolai Schröder in 1888 and designed by Vasily Schaub survives and is used as a cultural venue. It is located at Petrogradskaya Embankment 32.

== Instruments and markings ==
The firm built square pianos, grands, uprights and the small royalino. Nameboards were lettered "J. F. Schröder", "C. M. Schröder" or, in Cyrillic, "К. М. Шредер"; the German spelling was retained throughout, as with most Petersburg makers.

Serial numbers reported by the Great Russian Encyclopedia reached 3,000 by 1850, 5,000 by 1865, 10,000 by 1888, 20,000 by 1900, 30,000 by 1909 and 42,000 by 1918. Sergeev gives a somewhat different sequence, with 3,000 reached in 1852, 4,500 in 1865, 29,000 in 1910 and 34,000 in 1915.

Surviving instruments of note include grand no. 17003, made in 1898 to the order of Nicholas II as a birthday present for the Empress Alexandra Feodorovna and now in the Hermitage Museum; its case is painted throughout with scenes from the myth of Orpheus by Ernst Friedrich von Liphart, with carving by Solomon Volkovyssky and bronze mounts by Charles Bertault. Grand no. 6701, which belonged to Alexander Borodin, is in the collection of the Museum of Music at the Sheremetev Palace. Members of the imperial family used Schröder grands during their internal exile after the revolution; the whereabouts of the Alexander III and Rubinstein instruments are unknown.

== Exhibition awards ==
Russian exhibitions:

- 1831, Saint Petersburg – public commendation
- 1839, Saint Petersburg – small silver medal
- 1843, Saint Petersburg – public commendation
- 1861, Saint Petersburg – public commendation
- 1865 – small silver medal
- 1870 – right to display the state coat of arms, inscribed "For the exhibition of 1870"
- 1872, Moscow Polytechnic Exhibition – large gold medal
- 1882 and 1896 – exhibited hors concours

International exhibitions:

- 1870, Kassel – large gold medal
- 1872, London – honorary diploma, first class
- 1873, Vienna World's Fair – first medal for merit
- 1874, Naples – large gold medal
- 1878, Paris – gold medal
- 1885, London – gold medal
- Antwerp – honorary diploma
- 1893, Chicago – first prize
- 1894, Antwerp – grand prix

The firm's display in the Russian section at Chicago in 1893 was photographed and captioned as that of the oldest piano house in Russia.

== See also ==
- J. Becker
- Piano manufacturing
