= Leopold Münzer =

Polish classical pianist (1901–1943)

Leopold Münzer לעאפּאָלד מינצער
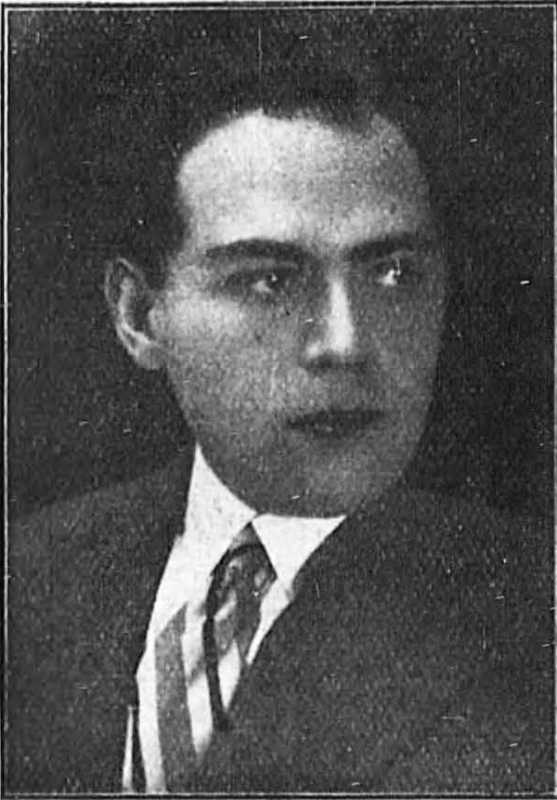
- Portrait in 1932

Background information
- Born: Leopold Münzer; March 8, 1901; Lwów, Austria-Hungary
- Died: July 1, 1943 (aged 42) Janowska, Poland
- Education: Conservatoire of Lwów; Vienna Academy of Music
- Occupations: Pianist; educator
- Years active: 1920–1943

Leopold Münzer (or Muenzer; March 8, 1901 – July 1943) was a Polish pianist and educator. He competed in the inaugural International Chopin Piano Competition in 1927 and became one of the foremost concert pianists and pedagogues in interwar Galicia. He headed the piano department of the Conservatory of the Polish Music Society from 1930 to 1939 and championed contemporary Polish music, particularly the works of his friend Józef Koffler.

Following the German occupation of Lwów in 1941, Münzer was confined to the Lwów Ghetto and later deported to the Janowska concentration camp, where he was compelled to perform in the Tango of Death, the camp's forced prisoner orchestra. He was murdered there in July 1943 during the Holocaust in Poland.

== Early life and education ==
Münzer was born in Lwów, then part of the Austro-Hungarian Empire, in 1901 to an Ashkenazi Jewish family. He began his musical training at the Galician Music Society's conservatory in Lwów, where he studied piano before 1914. He continued his studies in Vienna, enrolling at the Vienna Academy of Music under Jerzy Lalewicz, a prominent piano pedagogue. He also studied piano under Eduard Steuermann and composition alongside Hanns Eisler, and took courses on political science at the University of Vienna. He completed his training in 1919 and made his solo debut in Vienna in 1920.

== Career ==
Münzer began performing concerts in Vienna and became particularly known for his interpretations of Frédéric Chopin and promotion of contemporary Polish classical music. In 1927, Münzer competed in the First International Chopin Piano Competition in Warsaw, where he was awarded an honorable mention along with Dmitri Shostakovich and Yuri Bryushkov. His style of playing was strongly influenced by the composer and virtuoso pianist Emil von Sauer, and the public reacted favorably to his rendition of the mazurkas. He returned to Lwów and began teaching piano at the Conservatory of the Polish Music Society. In 1930, he was invited to become head of the conservatory's piano department, which he led until 1939.

He toured across Poland, Europe, and the Soviet Union. His concert repertoire ranged from J.S. Bach to Karol Szymanowski, Alexander Scriabin, and Sergei Prokofiev, whose Piano Concerto No. 3 he debuted in Lwów in 1930. He was a member of the International Society for Contemporary Music and collaborated with the Polish Section, which operated in Lwów from 1930 to 1933. He also belonged to the Jewish humanitarian association B'nai B'rith.

Münzer was a close friend and principal interpreter of the composer Józef Koffler, whom he may have first met in Vienna and with whom he taught in Lwów for many years. In 1929, Münzer served as a witness at Koffler's wedding ceremony. He premiered Koffler's Sonatina, Op. 12, in Lwów in 1930, and performed a radio broadcast of Koffler's piano works the following year. In recognition of this artistic partnership, Koffler dedicated his Concerto pour piano, Op. 13 (1932) to Münzer. In 1936, after a concert of music by Béla Bartók in Lwów, Münzer hosted both Bartók and the Koffler family at his apartment. In 1937, he performed Beethoven's Piano Concerto in C minor, Op. 37 as soloist at Lwów's Grand Theatre, in a program that also featured Koffler's Symphony No. 2, Op. 17. None of his recordings are known to survive.

== Later life and death ==
Following the Soviet occupation of Lwów in 1939, Münzer taught a piano class at the Lviv State Conservatory, which was established by the Soviet authorities in 1940. He gave two concerts for faculty and students at the Saint Petersburg Conservatory in May 1940 and performed at the Moscow State Symphony Orchestra on February 6, 1941.

After German forces occupied the city in June 1941, Münzer, as a Jewish resident, was forced into the Lwów Ghetto and subject to increasing persecution. Beginning in April 1942, he was forced to work in a shop that fabricated materials for the Wehrmacht. He was deported to the Janowska concentration camp outside of Lwów and played in the forced orchestra named the Tango of Death. He was murdered at Janowska in July 1943, aged 42.

Among his pupils were Jan Gorbaty and Fryderyk Portnoi, both of whom competed in the Third International Chopin Piano Competition in Warsaw in 1937.
