= Pfenninger =

Pfenninger is a surname. Notable people with the surname include:

- Fritz Pfenninger (1934–2001), Swiss cyclist
- Hans Pfenninger (1929–2009), Swiss cyclist
- Johann Konrad Pfenninger (1747–1792), Swiss theologian
- Louis Pfenninger (born 1944), Swiss racing cyclist
- Matthias Pfenninger (1739–1813), Swiss artist
- Otto Pfenninger (1855–1929), Swiss photographer
