= Theo van der Pas =

Dutch pianist (1902–1986)

Background information
- Born: Matheus Wilhelmus van der Pas; October 5, 1902; The Hague, Netherlands
- Died: December 1, 1986 (aged 84) The Hague, Netherlands
- Education: Royal Conservatory of The Hague
- Occupations: Pianist; educator
- Years active: 1919–1956
- Spouse: Jacoba Gilberta Rudolphine Middelraad

Matheus Wilhelmus van der Pas (October 5, 1902 – December 1, 1986) was a Dutch pianist and educator. He competed in the inaugural International Chopin Piano Competition in 1927 and performed as a soloist with the Royal Concertgebouw Orchestra between 1931 and 1956. He was a leading accompanist and pianist in the Netherlands and served as head of the piano faculty at the Royal Conservatory of The Hague.

== Early life and education ==
Van der Pas was born in The Hague on October 5, 1902, to Willem Pieter Fredrik Gustaaf van der Pas, a military grenadier and later clerk at the Netherlands Court of Audit, and Jacoba Vis. He came from a musical family, with his sisters Jacoba and Helena becoming dancers in Germany and England respectively. His brother Gustaaf Willem Frederik van der Pas became a violinist in Paris.

He received his training at the Royal Conservatory of The Hague under Carel Oberstadt and Karel Textor. He went on to study with Percy Grainger and Robert Casadesus. As early as 1917, he accompanied his sisters during a dance recital. He received his diploma in 1919 and began performing as a solo pianist at age seventeen.

== Career ==
Van der Pas appeared as soloist under conductors including Peter van Anrooy, Hermann Abendroth and Hans Weisbach. He was also in demand as an accompanist for leading soloists of the day, including violinists Carl Flesch, Nathan Milstein, Georg Kulenkampff, Jelly d'Aranyi, and Isolde Menges, and cellists Gregor Piatigorsky and Judith Bokor.

In 1927, Van der Pas competed in the First International Chopin Piano Competition in Warsaw, where he was awarded the diplôme de distinction along with Dimitri Shostakovich. He expressed that Frédéric Chopin was among his favorite composers. The music critic Philip Kruseman, writing in 1939, described him as among the finest Dutch pianists. After recording Beethoven's Sonata Pathétique, he began recording extensively with Pablo Casals and especially Emanuel Feuermann, including the Brahms Cello Sonata No. 1 in 1934.

Between 1931 and 1956, Van der Pas performed as a soloist with the Royal Concertgebouw Orchestra on 38 occasions, performing under conductors including Eduard van Beinum, Nico Treep, Willem van Otterloo, Willem Mengelberg, Toon Verhey, Jan Koetsier, Eugen Jochum, Hugo Balzer, Charles Munch, Hein Jordans, Basil Cameron, Pierre Monteux, and Erich Leinsdorf.

Van der Pas was a member of the Haagse Kunstkring (Hague Art Circle), and his portrait was depicted by the painter Han van Meegeren. In 1952, he served as a jury member at the Queen Elisabeth Competition in Belgium.

In 1956, Van der Pas retired from his career as a concert and accompanying pianist and continued as head of the piano department at the Royal Conservatory of The Hague. Among his pupils were Joop Stokkermans, Rob van Kreeveld, and Rudy de Heus.

Van der Pas married Jacoba Gilberta Rudolphine Middelraad. Their daughter Thea Ekker-van der Pas became a soprano, and their son Wim van der Pas wrote a biography of his father, Theo van der Pas, een leven met muziek (Theo van der Pas, a Life with Music).

Van der Pas died in The Hague on December 1, 1986, aged 84.
