= Münzer =

The German-language surname Münzer (also transliterated as Muenzer) may refer to:

- Friedrich Münzer (1868–1942), German classical scholar
- Hieronymus Münzer (1437/47–1508), Renaissance humanist
- Thomas Müntzer (ca. 1488–1525), Reformation Anabaptist theologian/politician
- Leopold Münzer (1901–1943), Polish-Jewish pianist
- Andreas Münzer (1964–1994), Austrian born heavyweight bodybuilder
