= Linzer Sanden =

Geologic formation in Austria

- Stratigraphic range: Chattian
- Type: Formation

Lithology
- Primary: Sandstone

Location
- Country: Austria

Type section
- Named for: Linz

The Linzer Sanden is a geologic formation in Austria. It preserves fossils dated to the Paleogene period.

== See also ==
- List of fossiliferous stratigraphic units in Austria
