= Józef Turczyński =

Polish pianist, pedagogue and musicologist (1884–1953)

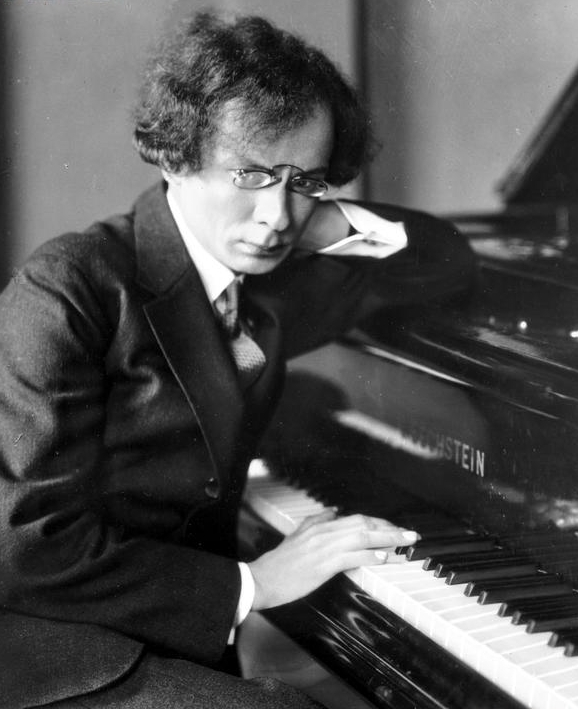
Józef Turczyński in 1936

Jozéf Turczyński (1884 – 1953) was a Polish pianist, pedagogue and musicologist who exercised a powerful influence over the development of piano teaching and performance, especially in the works of Frédéric Chopin, during the first half of the 20th century. He was in a large part responsible for a performing edition of the Complete Pianoforte Works of Chopin which is still considered definitive.

Turczyński was born in Żytomierz (Volhynia Governorate, Russian Empire, now in Ukraine). He was first a pupil of his father. In 1907–1908 he studied with Ferruccio Busoni in Vienna, and made his debut in 1908. He then made further studies with Anna Yesipova in Russia, and took first prize at the piano competition in St Petersburg in 1911. He played in all the European capitals, and from 1915 to 1919 was a professor at the Kiev Conservatory. Then he returned to Poland to take over the concert-pianists' class at the Warsaw State Conservatory.

Among the pianists who received instruction from him were Halina Czerny-Stefańska (1935–39), Witold Małcużyński, Henryk Sztompka, Stanisław Szpinalski, Max Fishman and Ryszard Bakst. See: List of music students by teacher: T to Z#Józef Turczyński.

The Edition of the Complete Works of Chopin, the most widely accepted edition since the Second World War, was begun under the editorial chairmanship of Ignacy Jan Paderewski in 1937. It was prepared for the Frederic Chopin Institute in Warsaw (Instytut Fryderyka Chopina, Polskie Wydawnictwo Muzyczne). On Paderewski's death in 1941, when it was only just begun, Turczyński took on the task with Ludwik Bronarski, and brought the work to completion in 1949 in 27 volumes. Each volume carries a bar-by-bar commentary upon variant texts as a supplement, and the edition was based primarily on comparison of autograph manuscripts, approved copies and first editions, with special attention to original dynamic markings and fingerings, etc.

In his later years Turczyński lived in Brazil, but he died in Lausanne, Switzerland.
