= Stanisław Szpinalski =

Polish pianist

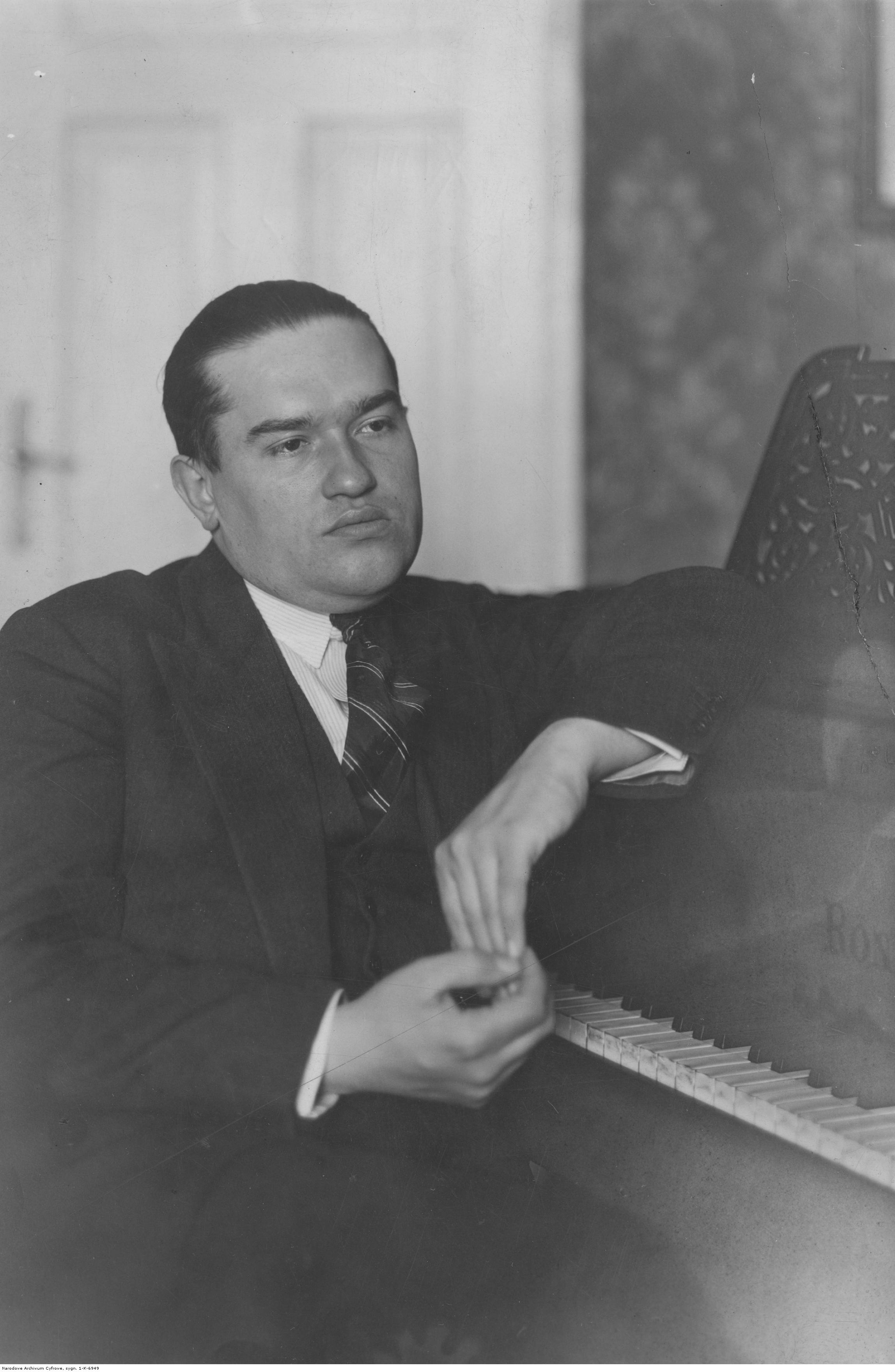
Stanisław Szpinalski

Stanisław Szpinalski (15 November 1901 in Yekaterinodar – 12 June 1957 in Paris) was a Polish pianist.

== Early years ==
Born and trained in Russia, he would return to his homeland as it was reconstituted. Once he finished his studies in the Warsaw Conservatory (1925), he spent two years in Paris. After that, he returned to Poland to participate in the inaugural I International Chopin Piano Competition.

== Career ==
There, he established himself as one of the leading young Polish pianists of his time, finishing second only to Lev Oborin. Not having been able to win the 1st prize, Szpinalski decided to carry on his training under the guidance of Ignacy Jan Paderewski, not beginning a virtuoso career until 1932; the outbreak of World War II interrupted it. By then he had settled in Vilnius, where he would be appointed the director of the city's Conservatory. One decade later, Szpinalski resumed his career extensively as a performer on the occasion of the 100th anniversary of Chopin's death, regaining his status. He later recovered from a bout of rheumatism, but shortly after, died of cancer.
