= Johann Konrad Pfenninger =

Swiss theologian (1747–1792)

- Born: November 15, 1747; Zuerich, Switzerland
- Died: September 11, 1792 (aged 44)

Johann Konrad Pfenninger (November 15, 1747 – September 11, 1792) was a Swiss reformed theologian of the Swiss Enlightenment in Zuerich, a close friend and relative of Johann Caspar Lavater. He also wrote on music and philosophy. He also knew Jakob Sarasin of the Sarasin family, and Johann Wolfgang von Goethe.
