= Riaan Manser =

Personal details
- Born: Riaan David; September 4, 1973
- Spouse: Vasti Geldenhuys
- Known for: Explorer

Riaan Manser (born 1973) is an explorer based in South Africa. He has done his exploring on a bicycle or a kayak.

In a 2013 trip dubbed "Take Me 2 New York," he rowed with his long-time girlfriend, Vasti Geldenhuys from Morocco, Africa to New York City, USA in an ocean rowing boat alone and unaided.

In 2016, now married, Geldenhuys and Manser rowed between California to Hawaii earning a Guinness World Record in the process.
