= J. Becker =

Russian piano company founded in 1841

Becker
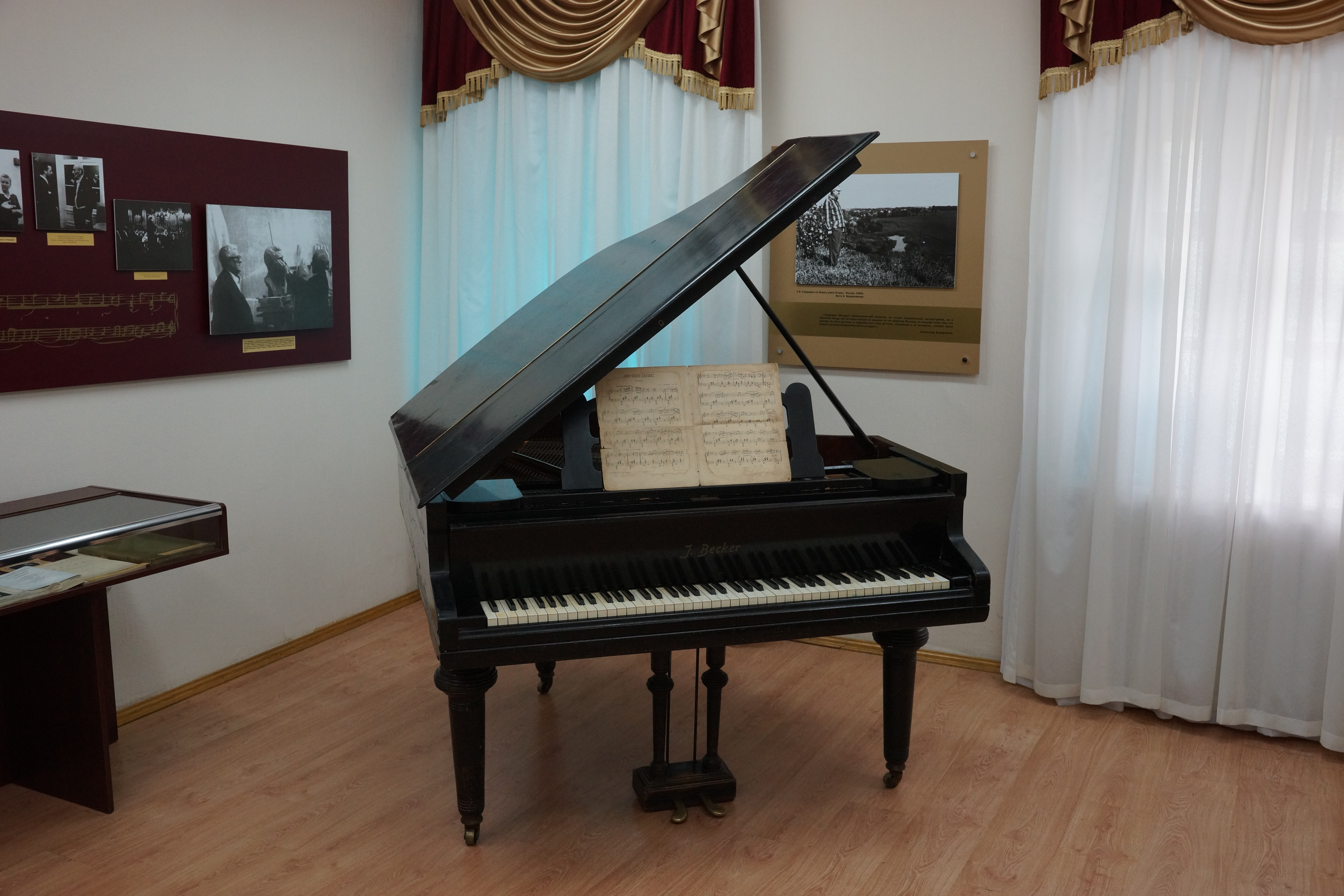
- A Becker grand piano located at the museum of Georgy Sviridov in Fatezh.
- Type: Private
- Industry: Musical instruments
- Founded: 1841 (185 years ago) in Saint Petersburg
- Founder: Jakob Becker
- Defunct: 1917
- Successor: Red October
- Headquarters: Saint Petersburg
- Website: beckerpiano.ru

Jakob Becker, also known as Becker, is a Russian piano company founded in 1841 in Saint Petersburg by the piano builder Jakob Becker.

The pianos featured modern technology for its time, including resonant sound, flexible keyboard action and solid construction. Becker was the first Russian piano maker to make Érard style double escapement and American style cross stringing.

In 1917, during the Soviet era, the company was nationalised and transferred to state ownership without proper compensation to the firm and changed name to Red October. It ceased operations in 2004.
