= Munzer =

Munzer, or Muntzer, is a surname. Notable people with the surname include:

- Friedrich Münzer (1868–1942), German classical scholar
- Thomas Müntzer or Thomas Munzer (c. 1489–1525), German preacher and theologian
- Andreas Münzer (1964–1994), Austrian professional bodybuilder
