= Yuri Bryushkov =

Russian classical pianist (1903–1971)

Yuri Bryushkov Юрий Брюшков
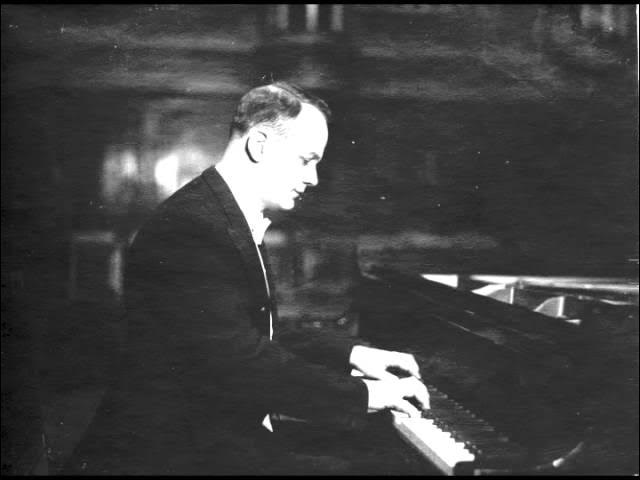
- Bryushkov at the piano, c. 1948

Background information
- Born: Georgy Vasilyevich Bryushkov; March 27, 1903; Moscow, Russia
- Died: March 11, 1971 (aged 67) Leningrad, Soviet Union
- Education: Moscow Conservatory
- Years active: 1920–1971
- Award: Honored Artist of the RSFSR

Georgy "Yuri" Vasilyevich Bryushkov (/ˈbrjʊʃkəf/ BRYOOSH-koff; March 27 [O.S. March 14] 1903 – March 11, 1971) was a Soviet pianist and music educator. He was awarded the title Honored Artist of the Russian Soviet Federative Socialist Republic in 1949 and was director of the Leningrad Conservatory from 1952 to 1962.

== Biography ==
Bryushkov was born in Moscow, Russia, in 1903. He studied piano at the Moscow Conservatory under Karl Kipp, graduating in 1925. He continued his studies under Konstantin Igumnov as a postgraduate. Bryushkov joined the Bolshoi Theatre orchestra in 1920 while still a student and began performing as a soloist a year before graduating. He remained at Bolshoi until 1930, performing with notable dancers like Maya Plisetskaya.

In 1927, Bryushkov competed in the First International Chopin Piano Competition in Warsaw. He withdrew from the final round after injuring his finger, and was awarded an honorable mention along with Dmitri Shostakovich. He joined the Moscow Philharmonic Orchestra as a soloist from 1935 to 1948 and performed widely across the Soviet Union and abroad. In 1954, he joined a Russian cultural delegation that included opera singer Maxim Mikhailov in performing across India to general acclaim. He also joined a Soviet delegation to Finland, performing with David Oistrakh and Valeria Barsova. Dozens of his recordings survive, especially of works by Frédéric Chopin.

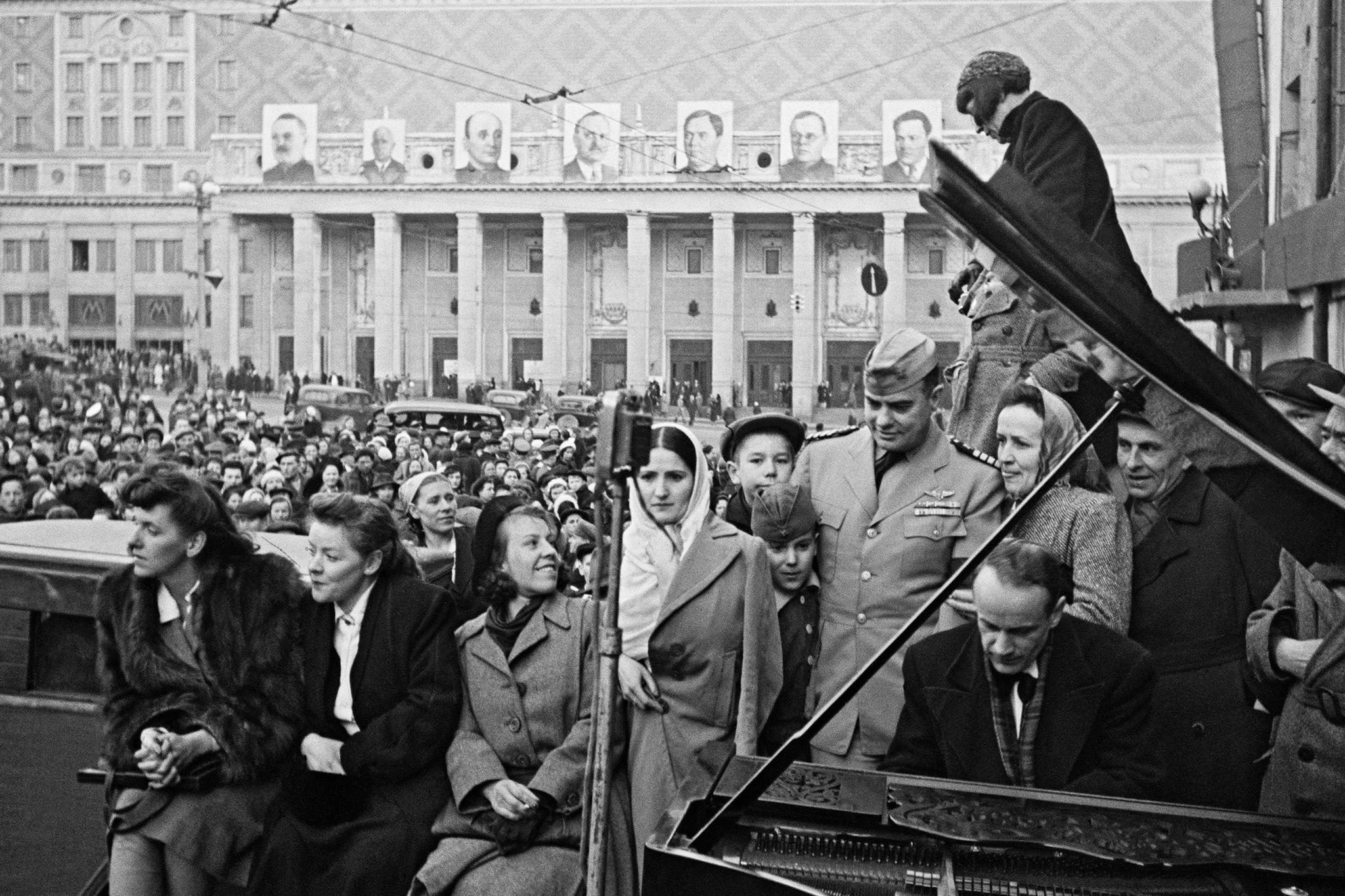
Victory Day performance in Moscow (1945)

He began teaching in 1939, first at the Central Correspondence Musical and Pedagogical Institute and then the Moscow Conservatory from 1942 to 1948. He was appointed an Honored Artist of the RSFSR the next year. In 1951, he began teaching at the Leningrad Conservatory as head of the department of piano, becoming a professor in 1957. He was the director of the conservatory for a decade after 1952 and led the department of piano until 1967.

Bryushkov died on March 11, 1971, in Leningrad. His ashes were buried at the Smolensky Cemetery.
