= Henryk Melcer-Szczawiński =

Polish composer, pianist, conductor, and teacher (1869–1928)

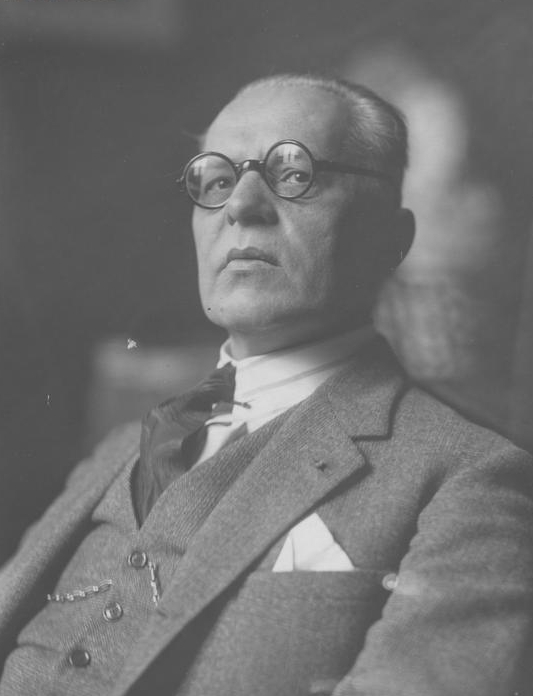
Henryk Melcer-Szczawiński

Henryk Melcer-Szczawiński (25 July 1869 – 18 April 1928) was a Polish composer, pianist, conductor, and teacher. He was the Director of the Warsaw Conservatorium from 1922 until 1928, when he reportedly died while giving a lesson. His students included composer and pianist Jadwiga Sarnecka.

== Works ==
=== Orchestral works ===
- Piano Concerto in e minor (1892-4)
- Piano Concerto in c minor (1898)
- Symphony in c minor

=== Stage works ===
- "Protesilas i Laodamia" (1902, libretto by S. Wyspiański) (Tragedy)

=== Chamber music ===
- Violin Sonata in G Major (1907),
- Piano Trio in g minor (probably written 1892-4)
- Dumka for Violin and Piano
- Canon for Violin, Cello and Piano (1890)

=== Piano works ===
- Trois Morceaux Caracteristiques Op. 5, for solo piano
- Morceau fantastique (Phantasiestück)
- Etude in D major, Op. 8
- Nocturne in A major
- Prelude in C major
- Fugue in C-sharp minor
- Variations sur un theme populaire polonais
- Quasi mazurka sur le theme W.M.S.
- Valse a la Chopin
- La Fileuse de l'opera "Maria"
- Canons (1890)

== Recordings ==
Both piano concertos were recorded in the past on Olympia and on Muza, and in 2007 on Hyperion. The Violin Sonata in G major, the Dumka for Violin and Piano and the Piano Trio, Op. 2 were recorded by the Warsaw Trio and Piano Works were recorded by Matti Asikainen for the AP label.

== Sources ==
- Piątkowska-Pinczewska, Katarzyna (1981). Chopin Playing from the Composer to the Present Day. Victor Gollancz Ltd. ISBN 0-575-02884-X.
- Methuen-Campbell, James (2003). Henryk Melcer-Szczawiński : życie i twórczość. Kalisz: Inst. Pedagogiczno-Artystyczny UAM. ISBN 83-913641-6-X.
- "Dreilaenderkatalog im Gateway Bayern" (in German). Archived from the original on 29 January 2005.
- "Library of Congress Catalog".
- "Melcer Henryk - biography" (in Polish).

Cultural offices
Preceded by Zygmunt Noskowski	Music directors, Warsaw Philharmonic Orchestra; 1908–1909	Succeeded by Grzegorz Fitelberg
