= Ryszard Szeremeta =

Polish musical artist (born 1952)

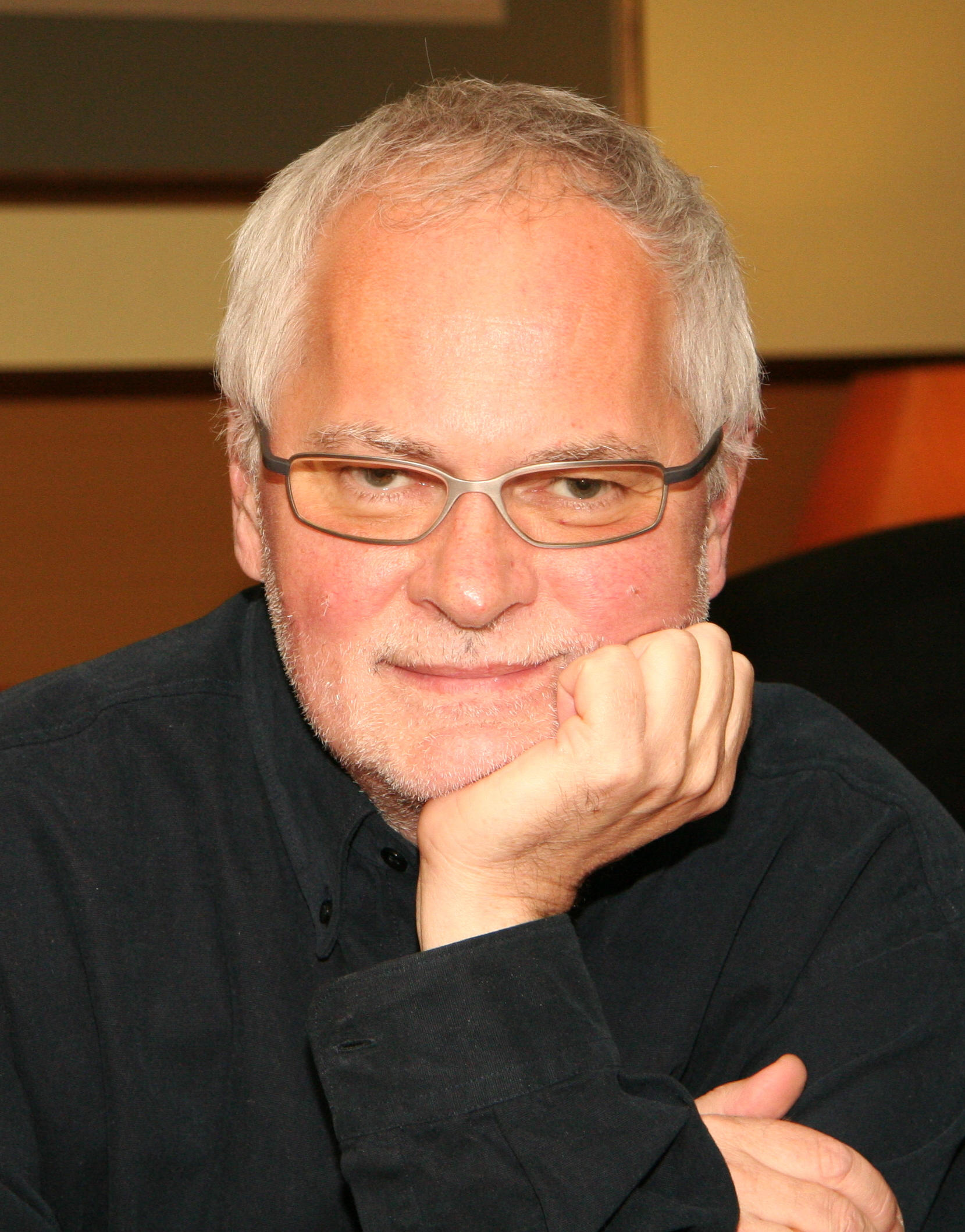

Background information
- Born: May 5, 1952 (age 73); Kraków, Poland
- Genres: digital sound synthesis, digital spatial project, sound architecture, music for tape, experimental music, electroacoustic music, electronic music, live electronics improvisation, scat singing, vocal transcription, big-jazz-band composition, film illustration in documentary picture
- Occupations: Composer, live electronics performer, jazz vocalist, conductor
- Years active: 1975–present
- Ansambles: Ensemble of the Experimental Studio of the Polish Radio in Warsaw, Novi Singers, Ensemble of Andrzej Trzaskowski's Studio S-1 Orchestra

Ryszard Szeremeta (born May 5, 1952) is a Polish composer of experimental music, producer of recordings, concerts and performances of electroacoustic music, jazz singer.

== Life and work ==
Szeremeta was born on May 5, 1952 in Kraków. At the Academy of Music in Kraków Szeremeta studied composition with prof. Lucjan Kaszycki (1971–75), conducting with prof. Jerzy Katlewicz (1972–1975), electronic music with prof. Józef Patkowski – founder and long-time head of the Polish Radio Experimental Studio – founded in 1959, the fourth in Europe electronic music center (1974–1976). Other prominent lecturers of Szeremeta are: Zbigniew Bujarski, Krzysztof Meyer, Krystyna Moszumańska-Nazar, Bogusław Schaeffer and Marek Stachowski.

In 1982 he completed postgraduate compositional studies at the Guildhall School of Music and Drama in London under the direction of Alfred Nieman and Robert Saxton, in 1986 computer internship at the Electronic Music Studio in Stockholm under Lars Gunnar Bodin and Tamas Ungvary, and in 1991 at the GMEB in Bourges, France (now IMEB: International Institute of Electroacoustic Music) under the direction of Françoise Barrière.

As a composer Szeremeta made his debut at the Warsaw Autumn International Festival of Contemporary Music in 1981 with "Advocatus Diaboli" symphonic piece under the baton of Andrzej Markowski. From 1976 until its dissolution in 1985, he was a baritone with the vocal jazz quartet Novi Singers (along with Ewa Wanat, Waldemar Parzyński and Janusz Mych), with whom he has performed in Poland and abroad (including the Jazz Jamboree in Warsaw and the Montreux Jazz Festival ) and for which he arranged Polish folk music, carols and mazurkas by Fryderyk Chopin. In 2001 the group came together again for a performance at the Warsaw Autumn.

Szeremeta brought nine of his works for the world premieres during the Warsaw Autumn Festival of Contemporary Music. From 1985 to 1998, he also took over and directed the Polish Radio Experimental Studio. He collaborated with Andrzej Trzaskowski's Polish Radio Jazz Orchestra. Since 1990 he has also composed for film and television (ARD, ZDF, SDF, Arte, 3 Sat). In the 1990s Szeremeta was a member of the Repertoire Committee of the Warsaw Autumn and was vice president of the Polish Composers Union. In 1991, he presented his compositions in New York (Lincoln Center) and Philadelphia (University of Pennsylvania). Presented at the Warsaw Autumn in 1995 "Triple Concerto for 3-tape exposition" was awarded in the EBU (European Broadcasting Union) competition and included by the jury of the International Society for Contemporary Music to the program of the World Days of Music Seoul 1997. Szeremeta is a sub-publisher of the Swiss multimedia publishing company Arcadia (M.S.I.).

== Awards ==
Szeremeta has received many awards, including with the Grand Prix at the Tadeusz Baird Competition for Young Composers (1977), the Polish Broadcasting Competition (1979), the Prizes at Electroacoustic Music Competitions in Bourges (1981), Varèse (1984) and Oslo (1989), Henryk Wars Prize of the Artists Association ZAiKS and the European Radio Union Tribunal in Budapest (1995).

== Part of compositions, performances and studio recordings ==
- Capricorn for harpsichord (1979)
- Advocatus diaboli for large symphony orchestra (1980-1981)
- Points I for electroacoustic layer and interactive improvisation (1981)
- Points II for electroacoustic layer and interactive improvisation (1981)
- Święty eksperyment for 12 voices, 2 prepared pianos, xylophone and magnetic tape (1983)
- Pulse rate for electroacoustic layer and interactive improvisation (1984)
- Amphora for electroacoustic layer and interactive improvisation (1984)
- Agent Orange for electroacoustic layer and interactive improvisation (1986)
- Miraculeo for electroacoustic layer and interactive improvisation (1988)
- Chamber Music for voices, electroacoustic layer and interactive improvisation (1988)
- Don Roberto and Dona Mercedes for saxophone, trumpet, percussion and electronic layer (1988)
- Constellation for vocal sextet and instrumental ensemble (1988)
- Trickstar for electroacoustic layer and interactive improvisation (1989)
- Mirror I – Liryki Jamesa Joyce’a for electroacoustic layer and interactive improvisation (1989)
- Mirror II – Liryki Jamesa Joyce’a for electroacoustic layer and interactive improvisation (1989)
- Entering 1990 for electroacoustic layer and interactive improvisation (1990)
- Patchwork for large symphony orchestra (1990)
- Vision and Utopia for electroacoustic layer and interactive improvisation (1990)
- M' bout M for electroacoustic layer and interactive improvisation (1993)
- SY 99 Message for electroacoustic layer and interactive improvisation (1993)
- Stringplay for electroacoustic layer and interactive improvisation (1994)
- Extraterrestrials for electroacoustic layer and interactive improvisation (1995)
- Hourglass for tape and violin or all others designated for interactive improvisation (1996)
- Triple Concerto for electroacoustic layer and interactive improvisation (1997)
- Metrograph Future for electroacoustic layer and interactive improvisation (1997)
- Un morceau de Mac for electroacoustic layer and interactive improvisation (1997)
- Future Music for electroacoustic layer and interactive improvisation (1998)
- Metrograph Words for electroacoustic layer and interactive improvisation (1998)
- Metrograph Touch for electroacoustic layer and interactive improvisation (1998)
- Belief for electroacoustic layer and interactive improvisation (1999)
- Metrograph 45 SE for electroacoustic layer and interactive improvisation (2002)
- Legendary Creatures for electroacoustic layer and interactive improvisation (2004)
- Ballet of the Electrons for electroacoustic layer and interactive improvisation (2010)
- Microcosmos Macrocosmos for electroacoustic layer and interactive improvisation (2012)
- The Art of Genetics for electroacoustic layer and interactive improvisation (2014)
- Soul Solution for electroacoustic layer and interactive improvisation (2016)

== Bibliography ==
- Official biography of Ryszard Szeremeta in the base of culture.pl - official website of Adam Mickiewicz Institute (English)
- Official biography of Ryszard Szeremeta in the base of polmic.pl - official website of Polish Music Information Centre (English)
- Graphic score of Ryszard Szeremeta's composition Points (1981) (English)
- Filip Lech, PRES Sampling #1 – Wojciech Kucharczyk (English)
- Lech Filip, PRES Sampling #2 – A_GIM (English)
- Lech Filip, PRES Sampling #3 – Bartosz Weber (English)
- Filip Lech, Ableton Live Gets Its Own Polish Radio Experimental Studio (English)
- The Tadeusz Baird Young Composers Competition (English)
- Alan Lockwood, Electroacoustic Music in Poland (English)
- Wojciech Oleksiak, A Foreigner's Guide to Polish Electronic Music (English)
- Marek Zwyrzykowski, The Musical Milestones of the Polish Radio Experimental Studio (English)
- Bolesław Błaszczyk, When Experimental Music Met Martial Law (English)
- Cezary Lerski, Polish Jazz - Freedom at Last (English)
