= Kazimierz Wiłkomirski =

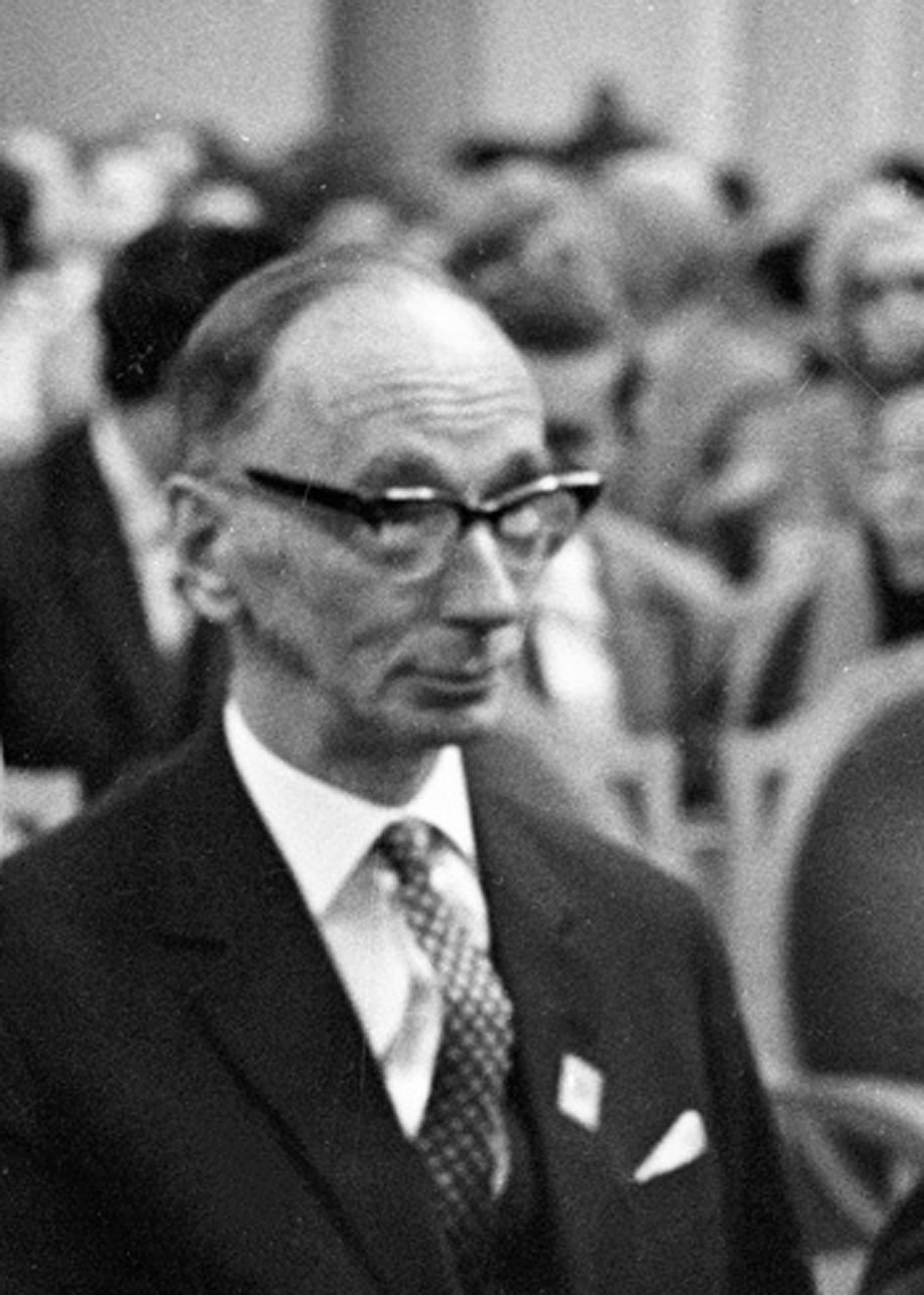

Kazimierz Wiłkomirski; (September 1, 1900, Moscow – March 7, 1995, Warsaw) was a Polish cellist, composer and conductor.

He was the son of Alfred Wiłkomirski, and the brother of Maria Wiłkomirska, Wanda Wiłkomirska and violinist Michael Wilkomirski.

He graduated from the Moscow Conservatory, where he was a cello student of Alfred von Glenn, in 1917. After working as a music teacher in Batumi, he attended the Chopin University of Music while simultaneously working as a cellist for the Grand Theatre's orchestra.

1930–1939 - member of the Kwartet Polski (Polish Quartet) with Irena Dubiska, 1945–1947 - Szymanowski Quartet. During World War II, he continued to live in occupied Warsaw. During the occupation, he participated in underground quartet concerts with Eugenia Umińska.

In 1934–1939 - director of the Gdańsk Conservatory; 1945–1947 - first rector of Łódź Conservatory. Director of the Baltic State Opera (then Gdańsk Opera) in 1952–57; professor of the Academy of Music in Sopot. After 1957 - Director and Principal Conductor of Opera Wrocławska.

Gave concerts as solo cellist.

== Works ==
Kwartet smyczkowy = String quartet (4 editions published between 1942 and 1984)

Symphonie concertante: pour violoncelle et orchestre = na wiolonczelę i orkiestrę = for violoncello and orchestra = für Violoncello und Orchester (1 edition published in 1974)

12 etiud na wiolonczele w I pozycji = 12 studies for violoncello in the first position (1 edition published in 1969)

Poemat: na wiolonczele i fortepian: pour violoncelle et piano (4 editions published between 1945 and 2002)

Ćwiczenia na lewa reke: Na wiolonczele = Exercises for the left hand: for violoncello (1 edition published in 1973)

Aria (2 editions published between 1947 and 1996)

== Books ==
Wspomnienia (2 editions published in 1971 in Polish)

Wspomnień ciąg dalszy (2 editions published in 1980 in Polish)

Cwiczenia na lewa reke [na wiolonczele] (3 editions published in 1955 in 3 languages)
