= Marcel Chyrzyński =

Polish composer

- Occupation: Composer
- Website: www.chyrzynski.com

Marcel Chyrzyński (born in 1971) is a Polish composer. He has been described as "a polystylist with an enormous sense of humour, and a lover of rhythm and jazz improvisation". Chyrzyński's works have been performed throughout Europe, as well as in South Korea, Australia, New Zealand, Japan, the USA and Canada.

Chyrzyński completed a master's degree at the Academy of Music in Kraków in 1995, where he studied composition with Marek Stachowski, orchestration with Krzysztof Penderecki, and computer music with Marek Choloniewski, Richard Boulanger, Cindy McTee and Rodney Oaks. Since 1994 he has been a lecturer at the Academy of Music in Kraków, and in 2010 became an associate professor in the Department of Composition, Conducting and Theory of Music. In 1998 he was awarded a doctorate in composition. Since 2014 he has been director of the Institute of Composition, Conducting and Music Theory.

Chyrzyński has received many awards and prizes, including 1st prize in the A.Krzanowski Competition for Young Composers in Bielsko-Biała, 1st prize at the 3rd All-Polish Adam Didur Composers' Competition in Sanok (1994), a citation in the Composers' Competition of the Polish Radio in Warsaw (1996), 3rd prize at the 2nd All-Polish Composition Competition Musica Sacra in Warsaw (1996), 3rd prize at the 3rd All-Polish Composers' Competition Musica Sacra in Warsaw (1997), and 1st prize at the Tadeusz Baird Composition Competition for Young Composers in Warsaw (1997).

In 1995 Chyrzyński became a member of the Polish Composers' Union, and at various times has served on that organisation's board. In 2005 he became a member of the Polish Society for Electroacoustic Music. Since 2014 Chyrzyński has been the director of the International Festival of Kraków Composers.

The list of compositions below is sourced from the composer's official website.

== Orchestral works ==
- Extended Perception of Echo* for Strings, 1992 (ca 7’30’’) – (8,8,8,8,4) or (6,5,4,4,4)
- La Musique d’adieu pour orchestre à cordes*, 1993 (ca 13’30’’) – (6,5,4,3,2)
- Piece for String Orchestra*, 1994/95 (ca 9’) – (6,5,4,3,2)
- Piece for Orchestra*, 1994/95 (ca 9’) – (2,2,2,2/4,2,2,0/tmp/strings)
- Trans-At-LAN-Tic*, 2006 (ca 7’35’’) – for symphony orchestra and tape, (3,3,3,2,1/4,3,2,1/3batt+tmp/pfte/strings)
- Ukiyo-e*, 2012 (ca 12’) – for string orchestra (6,5,4,3,1)

== Work for soloist and orchestra ==
- Concerto 2000*, 1999/2000 (ca 26’) – for clarinet and symphony orchestra (cl solo/3,3,3,3/4,2,2,1/2batt+tmp/ar/pfte/strings)
- Chamber Concerto 2000*, 1999/2000 (ca 26’) – for clarinet and string orchestra (cl solo/6,5,4,3,2) 2nd version of Concerto 2000
- Meditation No. 1*, 2010/11 (ca 15’30’’) – for alto saxophone and symphony orchestra (sax solo/3,3,3,3/4,3,3,1/batt (4esec)/ar/pfte/strings 16,12,9,8,6)
- Malchera*, 2014 (ca 16’) – for harp and symphony orchestra (ar solo/2,2,2,2/4,2,2,1/batt (4esec)/ar/pfte/strings 16,12,9,8,6)
- War Game*, 2014/15 (ca 17’) – Concerto for alto saxophone and large chamber ensemble (sax solo/1,1,1,1/1,1,1,0/batt (2esec)/ar/pfte/strings 1,1,1,1,1)
- Ukiyo-e No. 2*, 2015 (ca 18’) – Concerto for flute and symphony orchestra (fl solo/2,2,2,2/4,2,2,0/batt (1esec)/cel/strings)
- Ukiyo-e No. 3*, 2016 (ca 19’) – Concerto for violoncello and symphony orchestra (vc solo/3,3,3,3/4,3,3,1/batt (3esec)/hp/pfte/strings)

== Chamber music ==
- Three Preludes*, 1990 (ca 4’) – for clarinet and piano
- Three dialogues*, 1993/94 (ca 11’-12’) – for oboe and bassoon
- In C*, 1996 (ca 6’) – for clarinet, viola (cello) and piano
- Ferragosto per tromba, pianoforte e batteria*, 1997 (ca 17’) – batt (3esec)
- Tribute To Miles*, 1999 (ca 8’40’’) – for trumpet and one percussion player
- Reflection No. 1*, 2003 (ca 9') – for string quartet
- Strade di Venezia*, 2005/6 (ca 11’) – for flute, clarinet and bassoon
- Dry Pieces*, 2007/8 (ca 9’) – for woodwind quintet
- Reflection No. 3*, 2013 (ca 10’30’’) – for two pianos
- Farewell*, 2013 (ca 10’30’’) – for violoncello and piano
- Dance of Death*, 2013 (ca 5’) – for clarinet and piano
- Betelgeuse*, 2014 (ca 10’30’’) – for violin, violoncello and piano
- Haiku No. 2*, 2016 (ca 6’) – for clarinet and piano
- Reflection No. 4*, 2016 (ca 13') – for flute, clarinet, violoncello, percussion and piano (percussion 1 player: 2 suspended cymbals, 1 large tam-tam, vibraphone)
- Donghwasa*, 2017 (ca 9’) – for violin, sanjo gayageum and piano

== Solo works ==
- Miniatura*, 1988 (ca 4’) – for solo clarinet
- For you', 1991 (ca 3’) – for solo vibraphone
- Quasi Kwazi*, 1994 (ca 2’45’’) – for solo clarinet
- Quasi Kwazi II*, 1997 (ca 4’45’’) – for solo clarinet
- Quasi Kwazi III*, 1998 (ca 7’) – for solo clarinet
- ForMS...*, 2001 (ca 7') – for solo cello
- Reflection No. 2*, 2005 (ca 4’22’’) – for solo harpsichord

== Vocal works ==
- Pamiętam... / I Do Remember...* 1992 (ca 9’30’’) – for soprano and string quartet. Text: Jan Kasprowicz
- Cztery liryki miłosne* / Four Love Lyrics, 1994 (ca 12’) – for baritone and piano. Text: Kazimierz Przerwa-Tetmajer, Bolesław Leśmian
- Fuyu no sakura*, 2011 (ca 11’25’’) – for mezzo-soprano and violoncello. Text: Shinkawa Kazue
- Psalm 88*, 1996 (9’50’’) – for unaccompanied mixed choir (SS, AA, TT, BB)
- Per diem clamavi in nocte coram te*, 1996/97 (ca 11') – for unaccompanied mixed choir (SS, AA, TT, BB)
- 2nd version of Psalm 88
- ...similes esse bestiis*, 1997 (ca 5’) – for unaccompanied mixed choir (SS, AA, TT, BB). Text: Ecclesiastes
- Psalm 23* (Dominus regit me), 2013 (6’) – for unaccompanied mixed choir (SS, AA, TT, BB)

== Elactro-acoustic and electronic works ==
- Haiku*, 1991 (ca 12’30’’) – for voice, clarinet (EWI), processing and computer
- Nju MoDeL*, 1994 (ca 10') – for clarinet, processing and computer
- Coś tam underground*, 1994 (ca 9') – for trumpet, viola, double bass, percussion and computer
- Überraschung Cfaj*, 1995/96 (ca 5') – for clarinet, processing, two synthesisers and computer
- EXCH-33*, 2002 (ca 7’30’’) – for EWI (electronic wind instrument) and tape
- Mahamudra*, 2006 (ca 10’09’’) – for electronic sounds
- Beelden*, 2006 (ca 15’) – for amplified blockflute, harpsichord and tape
