= Wanda Wiłkomirska =

Polish violinist (1929–2018)

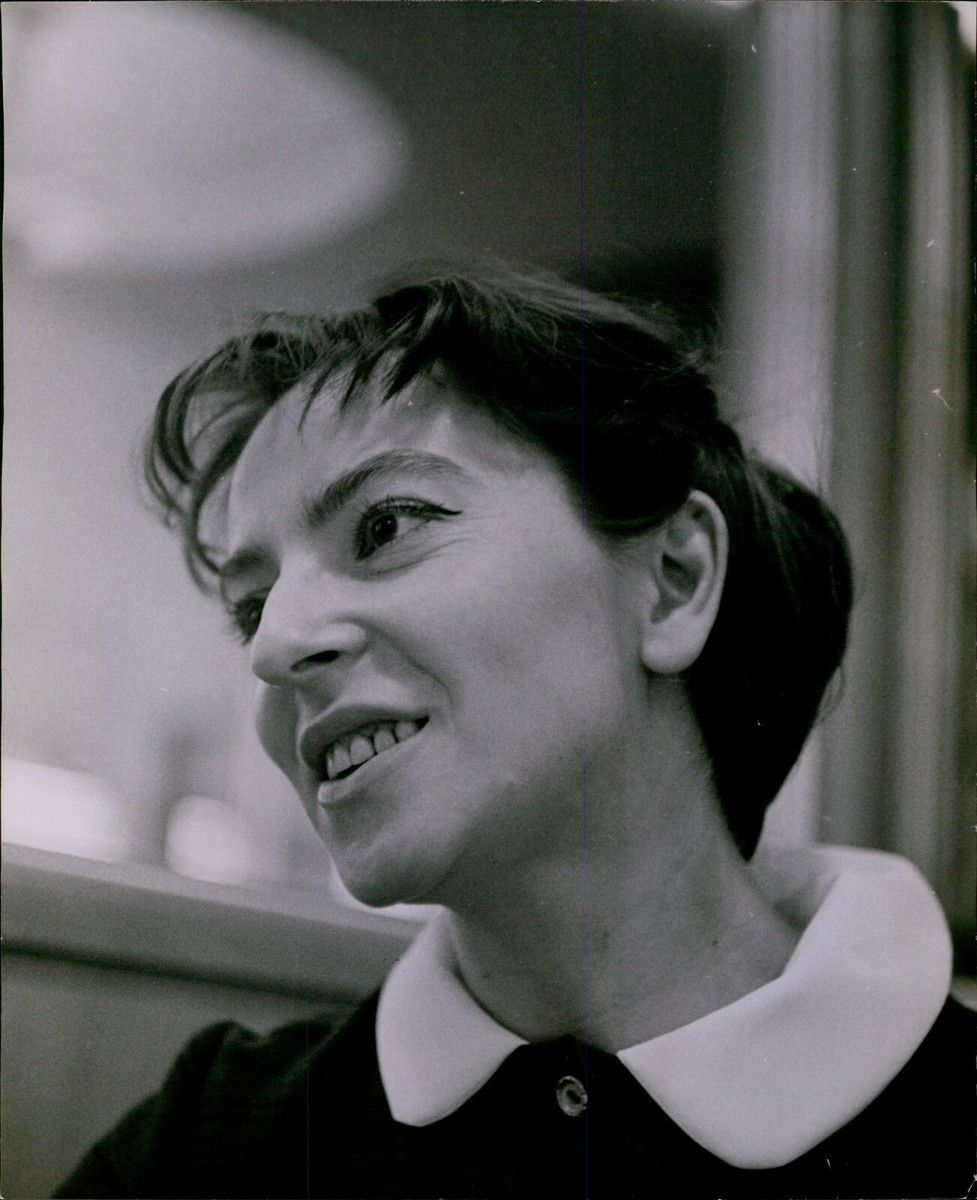
- Wiłkomirska in 1962
- Born: 11 January 1929; Warsaw, Poland
- Died: 1 May 2018 (aged 89); Warsaw, Poland
- Education: Academy of Music in Łódź; Franz Liszt Academy of Music
- Occupations: Violinist; Academic
- Organizations: Warsaw National Philharmonic Orchestra; Musikhochschule Mannheim; Sydney Conservatorium of Music
- Awards: International Johann Sebastian Bach Competition; Henryk Wieniawski Violin Competition; Order of Merit of the Republic of Poland; Order of Polonia Restituta; Honorary Doctorate from the Music Academy in Łódź

Wanda Wiłkomirska (11 January 1929 – 1 May 2018) was a Polish violinist and academic teacher. She was known for both the classical repertoire and for her interpretation of 20th-century music, having received two Polish State Awards for promoting Polish music to the world as well as other awards for her contribution to music. She gave world premiere performances of numerous contemporary works, including music by Tadeusz Baird and Krzysztof Penderecki. Wiłkomirska performed on a violin crafted by Pietro Guarneri in 1734 in Venice. She taught at the music academies of Mannheim and Sydney.

== Biography ==
Born in Warsaw on 11 January 1929, Wanda Wiłkomirska first learned the violin from her father Alfred Wiłkomirski, and studied with Irena Dubiska at the Academy of Music in Łódź, graduating in 1947. She next attended the Franz Liszt Academy of Music in Budapest where she studied under Ede Zathureczky, graduating in 1950. She performed in Paris, which led to Henryk Szeryng asking her to study with him. She won prizes at competitions in Geneva (1946), Budapest (1949) and Leipzig (the International Johann Sebastian Bach Competition, 1950; second prize). She also studied in Warsaw under Tadeusz Wroński, who helped her prepare for the Henryk Wieniawski Violin Competition in Poznań in December 1952, where she played Karol Szymanowski's Concerto No. 1 for the first time (it became a favourite of hers). She shared second prize with Julian Sitkovetsky; the first prize winner was Igor Oistrakh. In 1953, she was awarded the Polish State Award for music in recognition of her "eminent violin artistry".

In 1955, Wanda Wiłkomirska performed at the inauguration of the rebuilt Warsaw Philharmonic Concert Hall, with the Warsaw National Philharmonic Orchestra, playing Karol Szymanowski's First Violin Concerto under Witold Rowicki. She became the orchestra's principal soloist that year and gave many performances with the orchestra around the world, with such conductors as Rowicki, Stanisław Wisłocki and Antoni Wit. She held the position for 22 years. In 1961, she made her debut in the United States with the orchestra, which became the beginning of an international career. The American impresario Sol Hurok (who managed such violinists as Isaac Stern and David Oistrakh) introduced her to enthusiastic audiences in the U.S. and Canada. She performed in over 50 countries, in all continents. In the 1960s and 1970s, she gave an average of 100 concerts per year.

In 1969, she gave 37 performances in Australia, a country she later emigrated to. These interpretations won her great acclaim and she received further recital and concert proposals from Australian orchestras. In 1973, she was the first violinist to perform a solo recital in the newly built Sydney Opera House (she was accompanied by Geoffrey Parsons).

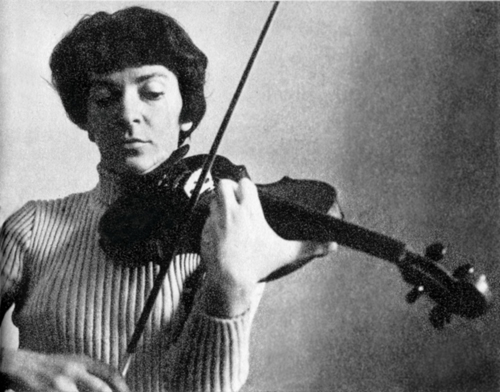
Wiłkomirska playing, 1977

In 1976 she helped inaugurate the Barbican Hall in London with a performance of Benjamin Britten's Violin Concerto, scheduled to be conducted by Sir John Barbirolli, but in the end by Erich Leinsdorf. Though married to a communist party official, in the 1970s Wiłkomirska became supportive of dissidents in Poland and in 1982, during the period of martial law in Poland, she announced during a concert tour in the West that she would not return to Poland at the end of the tour. One of her sons, Arthur, also defected to West Germany. In 1983, she accepted the chair of music professor at the Hochschule für Musik und Darstellende Kunst Mannheim. From that time, teaching became her great passion and an opportunity to share her instrumental skills and experience as a musician with the next generation of virtuosos.

In 1999 she joined the teaching staff of the Sydney Conservatorium of Music and since February 2001 also worked for the Australian National Academy of Music in Melbourne. She continued to be a part of musical life in Europe, flying between the two continents for concerts, master classes and competitions, while remaining involved in musical life in Australia.

Wiłkomirska was often a jury member at violin competitions, such as those held in Moscow, Tokyo, London, Munich, Vienna, Graz, Hanover, Gorizia, and in Poland, in Poznań, Kraków, Łódź and Lublin.

== Career ==
Wanda Wiłkomirska often performed in a piano trio, accompanied by her sister Maria at the piano and her brother Kazimierz on the cello, as the Wiłkomirska Trio. She also played with Krystian Zimerman, Daniel Barenboim, Gidon Kremer, Natalia Sheludiakova, Martha Argerich, Kim Kashkashian and Mischa Maisky. Wiłkomirska gave premiere performances of various Polish contemporary compositions, such as: Grażyna Bacewicz's Violin Concerto No. 5 (1951) and Violin Concerto No. 7 (1979), Tadeusz Baird's Expressions (1959), Augustyn Bloch's Dialogues (1966), Krzysztof Penderecki's Capriccio (1968), Zbigniew Bargielski's Violin Concerto (1977), Zbigniew Bujarski's Violin Concerto (1980), Roman Maciejewski's Sonata (1998) and Włodzimierz Kotoński's Violin Concerto (2000).

=== Recitals ===
Wanda Wiłkomirska gave recitals and performed symphonic concerts in many famous halls, including: Carnegie Hall, the Lincoln Center, Salle Pleyel in Paris, Leipzig Gewandhaus, the Royal Festival Hall, the Pyotr Tchaikovsky Hall in Moscow and the Berlin Philharmonie. She performed with the New York Philharmonic, the Cleveland Orchestra, the Hallé Orchestra, the Royal Philharmonic, the Sydney Symphony Orchestra, the Gewandhaus Orchestra, the Scottish Chamber Orchestra, the Royal Concertgebouw Orchestra and the Berliner Philharmonic, with such celebrated conductors as: Paul Kletzki, Pierre Boulez, Paul Hindemith, Otto Klemperer, Zubin Mehta, Sir John Barbirolli, Wolfgang Sawallisch, Kurt Masur and Erich Leinsdorf. She played only once with Leonard Bernstein, artistic differences leading to not repeating the experience.

=== Recordings ===
In 1968, she began regularly recording for the Connoisseur Society record company in New York, for which she made 12 albums, some with the pianist Antonio Barbosa. Two of these won awards, namely "Best of the Year" (1972) and the "Grand Prix du Disque" (1974). She also recorded with Deutsche Grammophon, EMI, Philips, Naxos, and Polskie Nagrania.

Her recordings include the works of Accolay, Bacewicz, Bach, Baird, Bargielski, Bartok, Beethoven, Augustyn Bloch, Brahms, Bujarski, Dancla, Franck, Handel, Karlowicz, Khachaturian, Kreisler, Martini, Mussorgsky, Pallasz, Prokofiev, Rachmaninoff, Ravel, Shostakovich, Szymanowski, Tchaikovsky, Viotti and Wieniawski.

Her recordings, mostly of chamber music, include:

- Wanda Wiłkomirska plays Polish Music, chamber music by Paderewski, Bacewicz, Zarzycki und Bargielski, with Paul Dam, Ambitus, amb97830
- Prokofieff: Two Violin Sonatas, with Ann Schein, piano, Connoisseur Society, CD 4079
- Works by Wieniawski, Lipinski and Bacewicz with Jadwiga Szamotulska, Gambit 1003–1
- Britten Violin Concerto, with the Warsaw Philharmonic Orchestra conducted by Witold Rowicki, 1967, Orchestral Concert CDs, CD12/2011
- Wanda Wilkomirska, chamber music by Moussorgsky, Kreisler, Wieniawski, Debussy, Bartok, Szymanowski and Sarasate, with David Garvey, piano. Connoisseur Society CS2070 (LP) Original release in SQ QuAdraphonic sound.
- Brahms: Violin Sonata No. 3 Op. 108; Beethoven: Sonata No. 5 "Spring" with Antonio Barbosa, piano. Connoisseur Society CS2080 Stereo
- Fritz Kreisler's Beloved Melodies, with Antonio Barbosa, piano. Connoisseur Society CS2022 Stereo
- Ravel: Habanera, Violin Sonata; Grieg: Violin Sonata No. 3, with Antonio Barbosa, piano. Connoisseur Society CS2038 Stereo
- Bach: Music for unaccompanied violin, Sonata No. 1; Partita No. 2 Connoisseur Society CS2040 Stereo
- Franck: Violin Sonata; Szymanowski: |Mythes, with Antonio Barbosa, piano. Connoisseur Society CS2050 Quadraphonic
- Delius: Three Violin Sonatas, with David Garvey, piano. Connoisseur Society CS2069 Quadraphonic (1987)
- Brahms: Violin Sonatas No. 1 and No. 2, with Antonio Barbosa, piano. Connoisseur Society CS2079 Quadraphonic

== Personal life ==
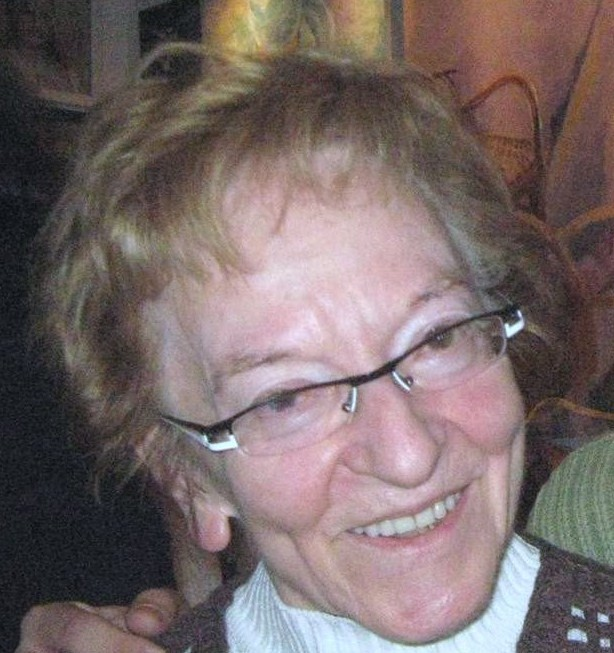
Wanda Wiłkomirska, 2010

Wanda Wiłkomirska married journalist Mieczysław Rakowski in 1952, editor-in-chief of Polityka since 1958. They divorced in 1977, two years after Rakowski joined the Central Committee of the communist Polish United Workers' Party (PZPR). Rakowski later became Prime Minister of Poland (1988–89) and First Secretary of the PZPR and established a reputation as a liberalizing reformist, influenced by Wiłkomirska and dissidents he met through her. They had two sons, one of whom emigrated to Australia.

Her mother, Dorota Wiłkomirska (née Dvoira Temkin, 1901–1986), was a pianist and music teacher, who also published several note collections for children.

Wiłkomirska died on 1 May 2018 in Warsaw, aged 89.

== Honours ==
- Polish State Awards (1953, 1964)
- Order of Polonia Restituta (1981)
- Commander Cross with a Star (2001)
- Medal for her work for the Polish community in Australia (2005)
- Award of the Karol Szymanowski Foundation (1997) for "a special emphasis on Karol Szymanowski's music; unique, ardent and expressive interpretation thereof; and propagation of his music worldwide."
- Honorary Doctorate from the Music Academy in Łódź (2006).
