= Janina Garscia =

Polish composer (1920–2004)

Janina Garścia
- Born: March 12, 1920; Kraków, Poland
- Died: March 1, 2004 (aged 83); Kraków
- Other names: Janina Gressel
- Occupations: Composer, teacher
- Era: 20th century music

Janina Gressel (born Janina Garścia; March 12, 1920 – March 1, 2004) was a Polish composer, pianist, and teacher.

== Career ==
In 1945, she graduated from the Władysław Żeleński State Secondary School of Music, in the class of piano professor Olga Stolfowa. She then studied at the State Higher School of Music in Kraków (composition with Stanisław Wiechowicz and conducting with Artur Malawski). From 1946 she worked as a piano teacher in Kraków schools, first at the Władysław Żeleński State Secondary School of Music (1946-1950), and later for many years at the S. Wiechowicza State Primary School of Music (1951–1995).

== Compositions ==
She composed roughly 700 pieces for children and teenagers, mainly for piano, as well as for cello, oboe, recorder, and percussion. She also composed works for four cellos, two pianos, and a folk band. Her works include musical illustrations, polyrhythmic pieces, pieces for piano and percussion for one performer, and pieces for piano with electronic music.

== Selected works ==
- The Easiest Pieces for Children (1946)
- Puzzle (1958)
- Little Suite for two pianos (1961)
- Zrytmizowany świat for piano and children's percussion instruments for one performer (1974)
- Cello Impressions (1981)
- Fairy Tales Written with Sound (1994)
- 6 Expressive Miniatures (1997)

== Arrangements ==
Some of her pieces have been arranged for accordion and harmonica. Many of her compositions have been included in method books in Austria, Japan, the Czech Republic, East Germany and the former Soviet Union. Her pieces are included in the Royal Conservatory of Music Piano Syllabus.

== Awards and decorations ==
She was the winner of the first degree departmental award (1973) and the award of the Prime Minister (1975). She was decorated with the Knight's Cross of the Order of Polonia Restituta (1983), the Medal of the Commission of National Education (1979), the Golden Badge of the City of Kraków (1972), and the Order of the Smile (2002).

== Commemoration ==
In Lubliniec, Chrzanów, Jelenia Góra, and Tczew, she is the patron of music schools.

Since 1993, the Janina Garścia International Contest has taken place in Stalowa Wola. She is also the patron of the Festival of Polish Contemporary Music for Pianists in Lubliniec.

== Bibliography ==
- Elżbieta Dziębowska, ed. (1987). Encyklopedia muzyczna PWM (in Polish). Vol. 3 (I ed.). Kraków: PWM. p. 238. ISBN 83-224-0344-5.
- Andrzej Chodkowski, ed. (1995). Encyklopedia muzyki (in Polish). Warsaw: PWN. p. 300. ISBN 83-01-11390-1.
- Kto jest kim w Polsce. Informator biograficzny, edition 3, Warsaw 1993.
