= Eugenia Umińska =

Polish violinist (1910–1980)

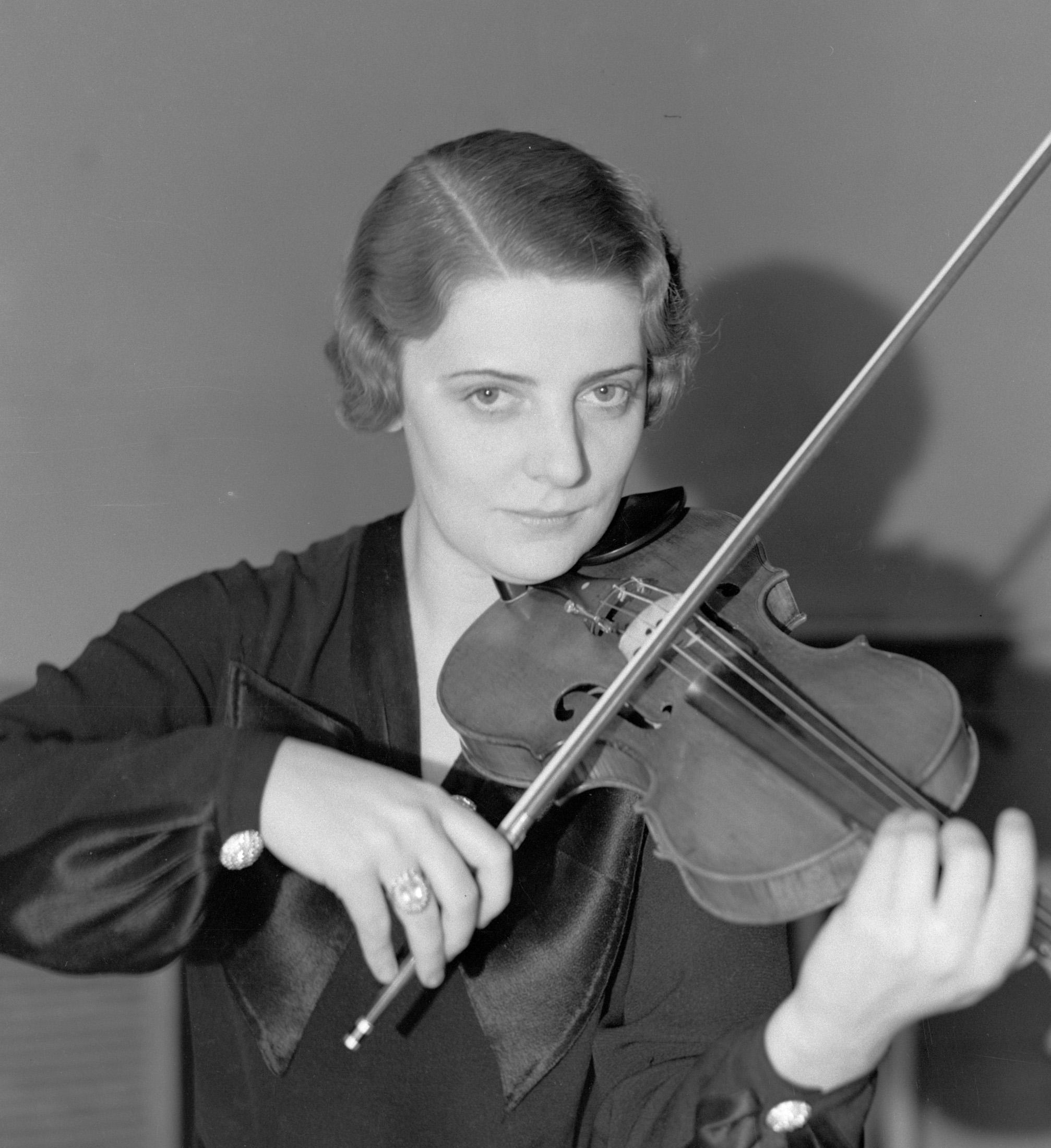
Eugenia Umińska in 1934

Eugenia Umińska (4 October 1910, Warsaw – 20 November 1980, Kraków) was a Polish violinist.

Student of the Warsaw Conservatory. From 1915 to 1918, she was a member of the Warsaw Music Society, where she was a student of Mieczysław Michałowicz. From 1919 till 1927 she studied at the Warsaw Conservatory with Józef Jarzębski. She completed her development with Otakar Ševčík (1927–1928) and George Enescu (1932–1934). In the years 1932–1934 she was the concertmaster of the Orchestra of the Polish Radio in Warsaw, and following this in 1937 became the second concertmaster of the Warsaw Philharmonic. At the same time, she was first violin in the string quartet of the Warsaw music society and member of the Polish string quartet. Playing in a duo with Karol Szymanowski she influenced similar compositions. During the 1940s she performed as soloist with orchestras in many countries. During the German occupation, a regular concert career was not possible, and instead she formed a piano trio with Kazimierz Wiłkomirski (cellist) and pianist Maria Wiłkomirska, which appeared regularly at a cafe-house in Zachęta-Gebäude. She took part in close to a hundred concerts before the start of World War II. In occupied Poland she refused an offer to play for the Nazi Germans, went into hiding and joined the Polish resistance (Armia Krajowa) as a medic. She took part in the Warsaw Uprising, was captured by the Germans but managed to escape during transit. After the war she became a professor at the Academy of Music in Kraków, and Academy's Rector between 1964 and 1966. She was active in various music-related organizations, and a judge in many musical competitions in Poland and abroad.
