= Żmudziński =

Żmudziński is a surname. Notable people with the surname include:

- Adam Żmudziński (born 1956), Polish bridge player
- Tadeusz Żmudziński (1924–1992), Polish pianist and educator
- Jakob Żmudziński (born 2009), Polish Chess and Basketball player
