= Władysława Markiewiczówna =

Władysława Markiewiczówna (5 February 1900 in Bochnia – 17 May 1982 in Katowice) was a Polish pianist and renowned educator.

She studied in the Conservatory of the Musical Society in Kraków (nowadays Academy of Music in Kraków) in the piano class of Severin Eisenberger as well as in the theory of music class of Zdzisław Jachimecki. 1922-27 she studied in Berlin (composition with Hugo Leichtentritt and piano with Bruno Eisner).

From 1929 she taught at the University of Music in Katowice, from 1958 as a Professor. From 1963 to 1968 she was head of the piano department. Her students include Tadeusz Żmudziński, Kazimierz Kord, Andrzej Jasiński and Wojciech Kilar.

== Notable works ==
Many of Markiewiczówna's works are published by Polskie Wydawnictwo Muzyczne (PWM).

- Variations on a Folk Theme for piano (1924)
- 2 Miniatures for piano (1926)
- Sonatina for oboe and piano (1935)
- Suite for two pianos (1936)
- Colored Pictures for flute, oboe, clarinet and bassoon (1937)
- Elementary Piano Course (1946)
- Colored Pictures for piano (1947)
- Toccata for bassoon and piano (1948)
- Sonata for clarinet, bassoon and piano (1952)
- Sonata for two pianos (1954)
- Sonatina for bassoon and piano (1954)
- 6 Preludes for piano (1955)
- Suite for soprano solo and chamber orchestra (text by Jan Brzechwa) (1958)
- Tema con variazione for piano (1965)
- Little Variations for piano (1966)
- 3 Bagatelles for bassoon and piano (1976)
- various songs
