= Krystyna Moszumańska-Nazar =

Polish composer, music educator and pianist

Krystyna Moszumańska-Nazar

Krystyna Moszumańska-Nazar (5 September 1924, Lviv, now Ukraine – 27 September 2008, Kraków) was a Polish composer, music educator and pianist. She was born in Lwów, Poland (now Lviv, Ukraine), and after World War II studied at the State Higher School of Music in Kraków with Stanisław Wiechowicz for composition and Jan Hoffman for piano. After completing her studies, she took a position as professor at the Academy of Music in Kraków and also served as Rector from 1987 to 1993. She died in Kraków after an extended illness.

== Honors and awards ==
- Winner of the Young Composers' Competition of the Polish Composers' Union (1954)
- International Competition for Women Composers in Mannheim (1961, 1966)
- First Prize/Gold Medal, International Competition for Women Composers in Buenos Aires (1962)
- Second Prize Karol Szymanowski Composers' Competition (1974)
- Award of the Polish Composers' Union
- Award of the Minister of Culture and Art (five times)
- Award of Merit for National Culture
- Prime Minister's Award
- Honoris Causa doctorate from the Music Academy in Kraków
- City of Kraków Award

== Works ==
Moszumanska-Nazar composed for orchestra, chamber ensemble, piano, vocal and electronic performance. Selected works include:

- Hexahedra jor Orchestr
- Suite of Polish Dances
- Exodus
- Music for Strings
- Polish Madonnas
