= Sylvia Čápová-Vizváry =

Sylvia Čápová-Vizváry M. A., ArtD. (Slovak pronunciation: [ˈsilʋɪɐ ˈtʂaːpɔʋaː ˈʋizʋaːri]; born 12 March 1947) is a Slovak pianist.

== Early life ==
Čápová was born on born 12 March 1947 in Szombathely, Hungary. She learned the basics of piano playing from her mother Gizela, a piano teacher. From childhood onwards, her abilities were recognised at numerous statewide competitions in Prague, where she received first prize on a number of occasions in succession. At the age of 7 she was admitted to the Conservatory and Academy of Music in Bratislava as a special student, and from 1965 to 1969 she studied at Bratislava VŠMU (University of Music and Performing Arts, Vienna), followed, in 1969, by further study in Leningrad. Subsequently, she studied at the Academy of Music in Kraków, before continuing studies again at Bratislava VŠMU. As a 15-year-old she had won first prize at the all-Czechoslovakia art schools' competition, and her earlier career also included successes in international competitions, including reaching the semi-finals of the Moscow Tchaikovsky Competition in 1966 and the George Enescu Competition the following year.

== Performances ==
Čápová regularly plays concerts in a variety of countries and has performed as a soloist with leading symphony orchestras. She has had CDs issued with a number of recording companies, and has appeared on Slovak and German radio as well as Slovak TV.
