= Andrzej Pikul =

Polish pianist (born 1954)

Andrzej Pikul (born 7 June, 1954, in Krosno) is a Polish pianist.

== Life and career ==
Pikul graduated from the Academy of Music in Kraków, where he studied under Tadeusz Żmudziński, and from the Hochschule für Musik und Darstellende Kunst in Vienna in the piano class of Paul Badura-Skoda (1981–83). He participated in masterclasses under Regina Smendzianka in Weimar (1975 and 1979), Alexander Jenner in Vienna (1981), Tamás Vásáry in Lenk (1982, 1983) and Asis (1988), Guido Agosti in Siena (1982) and Vlado Perlemuter in Paris (1983).

His recordings include works of Aleksander Tansman (Suite for 2 pianos & orchestra), Karol Szymanowski (Sinfonie concertante) and Alberto Ginastera (complete works for piano).

Pikul has given lectures and masterclasses throughout Europe, America and Asia (Universidade de Brasilia in Brazil, Universidad de La Serena in Chile, Osaka College of Music and Kobe College in Japan, University of Music and Theatre Leipzig, Hochschule für Musik Karlsruhe, State University of Music and Performing Arts Stuttgart in Germany, Universidade de Aveiro in Portugal). He was awarded honorary citizenship from La Serena in Chile (1994) and Iwonicz-Zdrój in Poland, where he initiated the Prince Michał Kleofas Ogiński Festival.

He has been a juror in various piano competitions: Concorso Internationale di Esecuzione Pianistica in Agropoli (1999), Concours de Piano „Premi Principiat d’Andorra” (1999), Maria Canals International Music Competition (2001, 2004, 2005, 2006, 2007, 2008, 2010, 2012, 2014), Osaka International Competition (2003, 2004), The Ruislip-Northwood Concerto Competition Harrow on the Hill (2007), The Fourth Chinese Works Piano Competition in Hong Kong (2008).

From 1982 he has taught in the Academy of Music in Kraków, where he has also been Dean of the Instrumental Faculty (1996–99) and Vice-Rector for International Affairs (1999-2002). 2002/2003 worked as a Visiting Professor in Kobe College, Japan. In 1999 he initiated International Summer Academy of Music in Cracow, an annual project consisting of masterclasses and concerts given by most eminent musicians. In 2010 he was named chairman of the Piano Department.

== Discography ==
- Alberto Ginastera. The Complete Music for Piano. [2CD] Dux Recording Producers 2007.
- Aleksander Tansman, Karol Szymanowski. Orkiestra Symfoniczna Filharmonii Lubelskiej, Andrzej Pikul - piano, Piotr Wijatkowski - conductor, Ewa Wolak-Moszyńska - piano.

== Bibliography ==
- Stanisław Dybowski, Słownik pianistów polskich ("Dictionary of Polish Pianists"), Przedsiębiorstwo Muzyczne "Selene", Warszawa 2003.
