= Alfred Wiłkomirski =

Polish violinist and pedagogue

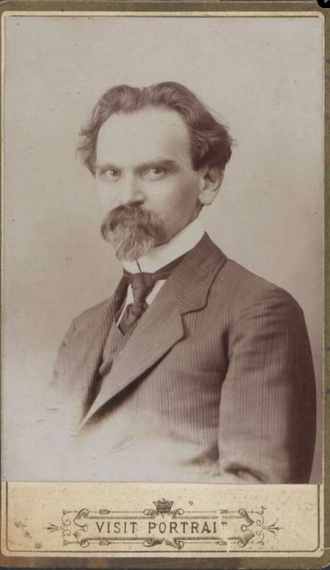

Background information
- Born: 20 January 1873; Azov, Don Host Oblast, Russian Empire
- Died: 30 July 1950 (aged 77); Łódź, Poland
- Genres: Classical music
- Occupation(s): Conductor, teacher
- Instrument: Violin

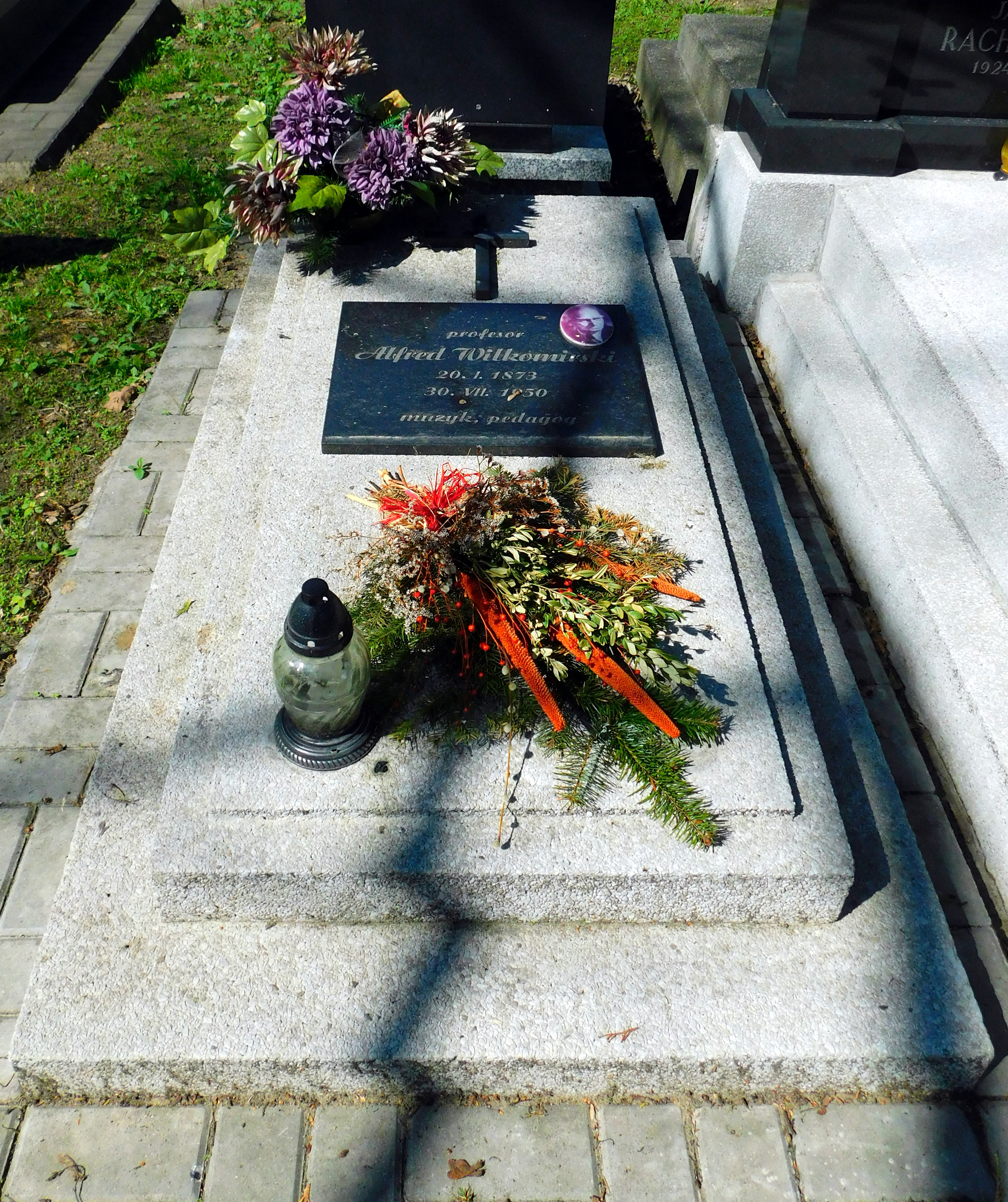
Grave of Alfred Wiłkomirski in Łódź.

Alfred Wiłkomirski (3 January 1873 - 31 July 1950) was a Polish violinist and pedagogue.

Born in Azov, Wiłkomirski studied under Jan Hřímalý at the Moscow Conservatory before embarking on a teaching career. Moving to Poland in 1920, he held positions in Kalisz (1920–26) and in Łódź (1929–39 and again in 1945–50). He was the father of the cellist Kazimierz Wiłkomirski, the pianist Maria Wiłkomirska, and the violinist Wanda Wiłkomirska, who performed as a trio around Europe and Asia; his son Józef was a composer and conductor, and his son Michał was a violinist.
