= Natalia Sheludiakova =

Natalia Sheludiakova is a Russian-Australian lecturer and concert pianist, currently teaching at the Sydney Conservatorium of Music.

== Biography ==
Natalia Sheludiakova studied piano in Moscow with Professor Oleg Boshniakovich at the Gnessin Institute. In 1981 she won the All-Russian Chamber Music Competition in Leningrad and was awarded the coveted prize for the best accompanist in the 1988 and 1989 All-Soviet Cello Competitions. She has accompanied cellists proficiently in the International Tchaikovsky Competition and performed as a chamber musician with many acclaimed artists including Igor Oistrakh (violin), Victor Simon (Principal Cello, Bolshoi), Douglas Cummings (Principal Cello, LSO), Anthony Camden (Oboe), Yuri Semenov (Principal Cello, Moscow Symphony), Dmitry Yablonsky (cello) and Alexander Kniazev (cello).

Her teachers are in the teaching lineages of Czerny, Beethoven, Haydn and Scriabin.

Sheludiakova was a member of the faculty at the Gnessin Institute from 1983 and Moscow Conservatory from 1989 and a member of the prestigious Moscow Philharmonic Society. Arriving in Australia in 1992, she was a member of the piano faculty at the Queensland Conservatorium of Music until coming to Sydney, where she has taught at the Sydney Conservatorium of Music since 1994.

Her students have gone on to postgraduate studies in France, Germany, England and Poland. They include Wojciech Wisniewski, Natalia Raspopova, York Yu and Julia Gu.

== Concerts and classes ==
Natalia Sheludiakova has performed chamber music with many of Australia's finest instrumentalists including Ronald Thomas, Wanda Wiłkomirska, Carmel Kaine, Mark Walton, Georg Pedersen, Frank Celata, Ester van Stralen and Maria Marsden. She has played extensively as a member of the Kur-rin-gai Virtuosi in recitals, broadcasts and recordings on both ABC Classic and 2MBS FM, and tours including Hong Kong, Denmark, at the Moscow Conservatory and throughout Australia.

In 2004 she performed Poulenc's Concerto for two pianos with Ellen Rapoport and the Sydney Youth Orchestra. In 2007 she played the Brahms F minor Quintet with Pietari Inkinen and members of the Queensland Orchestra in Brisbane.

Sheludiakova has given numerous masterclasses throughout Australia and overseas, for conservatoria in Brisbane, Perth, Sydney, Canberra, Adelaide, Wollongong, Wellington, Paris, Hong Kong and Copenhagen. She has taught at Yale College, Oxford University, the Sorbonne and the Chopin Conservatory.
