= Jadwiga Szamotulska =

Polish pianist and pedagogue

- Born: 28 May 1911; Warsaw, Poland
- Died: 14 November 1981 (aged 70); Warsaw, Poland
- Education: Warsaw Conservatory
- Occupations: Pianist; Academic; Translator; Librettist
- Organization: Academy of Music in Kraków

Jadwiga Szamotulska (28 May 1911 – 14 November 1981) was a Polish pianist, pedagogue, translator of art-song lyrics and librettos, university instructor at the Academy of Music in Kraków (then called Państwowa Wyższa Szkoła Muzyczna) in Kraków, performing artist with the National Philharmonic in Warsaw (Filharmonia Narodowa) in Warsaw, and voice coach for the soloists of the Grand Theatre, Warsaw (Teatr Wielki).

Szamotulska recorded for many years with violinist Wanda Wiłkomirska for the Polskie Nagrania record label, notably the music of Poland's leading classical composers Henryk Wieniawski, Karol Szymanowski and Grażyna Bacewicz.

== Career ==
Szamotulska was born and lived in Warsaw for most of her life. In the interwar period, she studied piano at the Warsaw Conservatory (now Fryderyk Chopin University of Music) with teachers Paweł Lewiecki and Marcelina Kimont-Jacynowa. After graduation, she worked as an accompanist at her alma mater. Following the invasion of Poland in 1939, she performed at clandestine concerts. After the conclusion of the war in 1945 she obtained the position of accompaniment class director at the PWSM in Kraków, which she held until 1965. In 1948, she performed in the premiere of Witold Lutosławski's Two Children's Songs, with Irena Wiskida.

She then relocated back to Warsaw, and joined the orchestra of National Philharmonic (Filharmonia Narodowa). At the same time, until 1972, she worked as voice teacher with the soloists of Grand Theatre, Warsaw, where she coached soprano Halina Łukomska among others, and translated several hundred art songs (including by Johannes Brahms and Franz Schubert). She translated librettos of operas, such as Handel's Giulio Cesare for its first performance at the theatre in 1962.

She lived at Marszałkowska 35 street in Warsaw, and died on 14 November 1981. Szamotulska is buried at the Powązki Cemetery (Stare Powązki) in Warsaw.

Her recordings include a 1957 collection of classical music for children, with violinist Wanda Wiłkomirska, presenting Giovanni Battista Viotti's Violin Concerto No. 23 in G major, Jean-Baptiste Accolay's Concerto in A minor, Pyotr Ilyich Tchaikovsky's Old French Song, Op. 39/16, and Wieniawski's Chanson polonaise, Op. 12/2, among others.

== Discography ==
- Wanda Wiłkomirska dzieciom (Wanda Wiłkomirska for children), Wanda Wilkomirska, Jadwiga Szamotulska. Data di pubblicazione: 1 gennaio 1957. Etichetta: Polskie Nagrania 2096.
- Wspomnienia Z Paryża, René Glaneau, Orkiestra Ryszarda Damrosza, Polskie Nagrania L 0319, 1960.
- Carnavalul Animalelor (as J. Sramolniska): The Carnival of the Animals by Camille Saint-Saëns, Debussy's Children's Corner – Orchestra simfonică a Filarmonicii Naționale din Varșovia, conducted by Witold Rowicki (LP, Mono), Electrecord, Electrecord ECE 0395, ECE-0395.
- Tematyka Dziecięca W Muzyce Symfonicznej (Children's Themes in Symphonic Music), The Carnival of the Animals, Children's Corner, Orkiestra Symfoniczna Filharmonii Narodowej, Polskie Nagrania Muza XL 0232.
- Händel, Ravel, Szymanowski, works by Handel (aria) and Ravel (Chansons madécasses); Wanda Bieniecka (soprano), Jerzy Chudyba (flute), Henryk Palulis (violin), Wanda Borucińska (cello), Veriton, SXV-788, SXV-788-P.
