= Mizerna cicha =

„Mizerna, cicha“ ("Miserable, Quiet") is a traditional Polish Christmas carol written by Teofil Lenartowicz in 1849. The original melody was composed by Jakub Wrzeciono in the 19th century, but nowadays the best-known version was composed by Jan Gall around the year 1900.

== Lyrics ==
The song originally had 11 verses of which people nowadays typically sing four or five, which are listed below.

Original Polish lyrics (1849 Lenartowicz)	Literal translation	English lyrics (2008 Jill Gallina) © ASCAP	English lyrics (2019 Ion Mittler); CC BY-SA 4.0	English lyrics (2023, Jakub Gad-Ślusarz)
Mizerna, cicha, stajenka licha pełna niebieskiej chwały. Oto leżący, przed nami śpiący w promieniach Jezus mały.	A poor and quiet humble stable full of heavenly glory: Here rests in front of us, sleepy and radiant, the small Jesus.	Only a manger bed for the stranger, rocked in a ...	Humble and quiet forgotten stable full of heavenly glory: At this late moment guests were able to rest from their journey.	Quiet and feeble, this meagre stable brimming with heavenly glory Here, He lies sleeping, peaceful, unweeping glittering Jesus Holy
Nad nim anieli w locie stanęli i pochyleni klęczą. Z włosy złotymi, z skrzydła białymi pod malowaną tęczą.	Angels above him stopped flying and bowed on their knees. With golden hair, with white wings, under a colourful rainbow.		Heavenly angels around the shepherds on their knees are bowing, golden hair shining, white wings glowing over the Child are bending.	Angels allying, stop in their flying, they kneel down in prayer Gold and white-feathered, banded together under a rainbow layer
I oto mnodzy, ludzie ubodzy radzi oglądać Pana. Pełni natchnienia, pełni zdziwienia upadli na kolana.	And here there are many poor people, who ask to look at the Lord. Full of surprise, full of astonishment they fell on their knees.		Out in the village people now gather, to come and see the Newborn. Seeing this mirage, they start to wonder, might this be Divine Lord?	Poor people gather, sister and brother all glad to see our Saviour What inspiration!, what animation!, all of them kneel in candour
Wielkie zdziwienie: wszelkie stworzenie cały świat orzeźiony. Mądrość Mądrości, Światłość Światłości; Bóg - człowiek tu wcielony!	A great surprise: all creation, the whole world gets renewed: Wisdom from wisdom, light from light, God born as man here.		Works of mercy, signs of glory everywhere will be heard: Wisdom, kindness, light in darkness He will bring to our world.	What great elation!, what great creation! all of the world has garnered Wisdom of Wisdom, Radiance of Radiance, here lies God incarnate!
Oto Maryja, czysta lilija przy niej staruszek drżący. Stoją przed nami, przed pastuszkami tacy uśmiechający.	Here is Mary, a pure lily, with her trembling old man: They stand before us, in front of the shepherds, smiling so.			Dear Virgin Mary, the purest lily, and by her side Joseph gleaming stand here before us – the shepherd chorus, both of their kind faces beaming
