= Jan Gall =

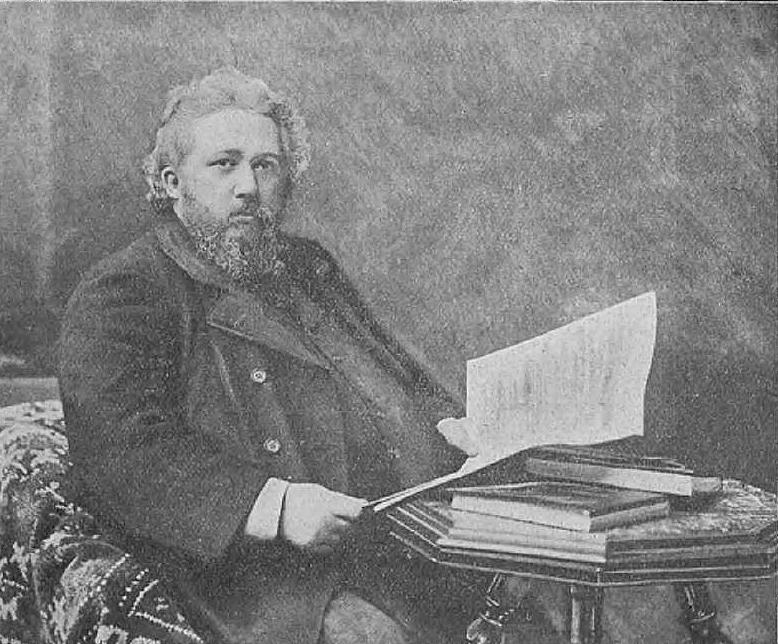
Jan Gall (1901)

Jan Karol Gall (August 18, 1856 – October 30, 1912) was a Polish vocal composer and music teacher.

Gall was born in Warsaw, and studied under Franz Krenn in Vienna, Josef Rheinberger in Munich, and Francesco Lamperti in Milan. In 1880, he became conductor of the Galician Music Society in Lemberg (modern-day Lviv, Ukraine); in 1886, professor of singing at the Kraków Conservatory; and from 1892, conductor of a choral society, "Echo", in Lwów [Lemberg].

He wrote about 400 songs, choruses, quintets, and so on, and his compositions were quite popular at the time, including a popular version of Mizerna cicha.
