= Marek Stachowski (composer) =

Polish composer

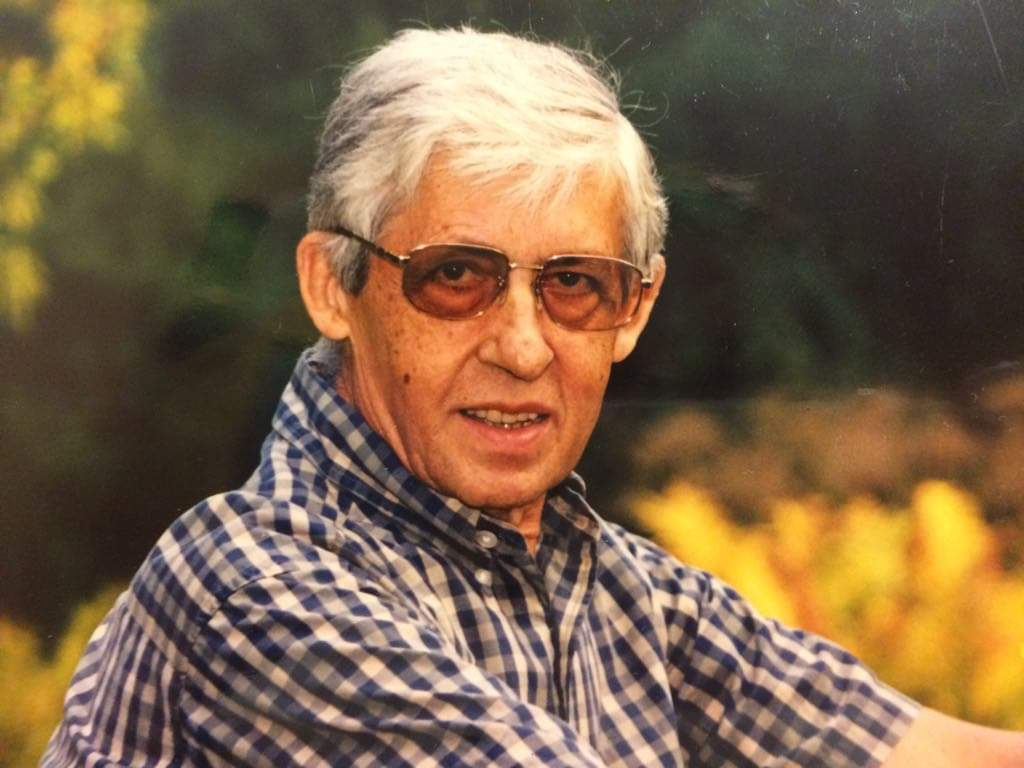

Marek Stachowski (21 March 1936 – 3 November 2004) was a Polish composer. He received many awards and won many competitions for composers, including first prize at the K. Szymanowski Competition in 1974.

== Personal life and education ==
Stachowski was born March 21, 1936, in Piekary Śląskie and died in Kraków on 3 December 2004.

Stachowski spent the first three years of life with his parents in the Silesia province of Poland. However, after the start of World War II, he traveled with his mother across Poland to Bydgoszcz, where the composer's father was hiding from the Nazis.

In 1952, Stachowski began attending the piano classes given by Stanisław Czerny at the State First Level Music School in Kraków. In 1959, at the State Second Level Music School he obtained a diploma in piano on a "fast-track" basis, and also in 1960 in the theory of music. In 1962 he married Maria Jabłońska.

From 1963 to 1968, Stachowski studied composition under Krzysztof Penderecki and music theory at the State Higher School of Music in Kraków (today known as Academy of Music in Kraków), from which he graduated with honours. During his studies at the State Higher School of Music in Kraków (today known as Academy of Music in Kraków) he achieved his first international successes: in 1968, the prize during the International Competition of the 'Gaudeamus' Foundation for the piece entitled Musica Con una Batuta del Tam-tam; the first prize during the Artur Malawski Competition for Composers for the piece Neusis I as well as the award for Sequenze Concerttatii received during the Competition for Young Musicians organised by the Polish Composers’ Union. The following year, he won second prize in the International Competition organised by the 'Solidarity Committee' in Skopje for his piece entitled Chant de l'espoir. In 1970 Audition for flute, cello and piano was Marek Stachowski's first piece which was performed during the Warsaw Autumn festival. In 1971, he was awarded the third prize during the National Competition for Composers for the cantata 'Słowa do wierszy W. Broniewskiego' ('Words for the W.Broniewski's Poems'). He was three times awarded during the International Tribune of Composers (UNESCO) in Paris: in 1974 for Neusis II, in 1979 he was again awarded for the Divertimento for string orchestra and in 1990 for III String Quartet written on the request of the BBC Bristol. In 1974 he received the first prize in the Karol Szymanowski Competition for the piece entitle Thakurian Chants. In 1975, he was giving lectures at the Yale University (USA). One year later he received the musical prize of the city of Mönchengladbach for the piece entitled Poeme sonore. In 1984 he received the prize of the Polish Composers’ Union.

Apart from his creative work, Marek Stachowski was also a highly respected educator. From 1967 he gave composition classes at the State Higher School of Music in Kraków, from 1981 as a full professor. In this role he taught many of the younger and middle generations of Polish composers. Between the years 1993-1999 and 2002-2004 he was rector of the Academy. He also lectured in composition at the Rubin Academy of Music and Dance in Jerusalem, during the summer courses at Durham University, and gave seminars as part of Gaudeamus Music Week. He served on many juries of competitions for composers and performers, including the Krzysztof Penderecki Competition in Kraków.

== Legacy ==
One of the streets in Kraków is named in Stachowski's honor.

== Works ==
- String Quartet No. 1 (1963)
- Five Senses and a Rose for voice and for four instruments (1964)
- Musica da camera for flute, cello, harp and drums (1965)
- Musica per quartetto d’archi (1965)
- The Bravest Knight, children's opera in 3 acts for soprano, tenor, 2 baritones, bass, mixed choir and orchestra (1965)
- Musica con una battuta del tam-tam for orchestra (1966)
- Ricercar 66 for concerting organ and chamber orchestra (1966)
- Sequenze concertanti for large symphony orchestra (1968)
- Neusis II for two vocal ensembles, percussion, cellos and double basses (1968)
- Chant de l’espoir for reciting voice, soprano, baritone, boychoir, mixed choir and large symphony orchestra (1969)
- Irisation for large symphony orchestra (1969–70)
- Audition for flute, cello and piano (1970)
- Extensions for piano (1971)
- Words... for solo voices, mixed choir and large symphony orchestra (1971)
- String Quartet No. 2 (1972)
- Musique solennelle for symphony orchestra (1973)
- Thakurian Chants for mixed choir and orchestra (1974)
- Poème sonore for symphonic orchestra (1975)
- Birds for soprano and instruments (1976)
- Divertimento for chamber string orchestra (1978)
- Odysseus amidst the White Keys for children for piano (1979)
- Quartetto da ingresso(1980)
- Choreia for symphony orchestra (1980)
- Symphony of Songs Sanctified by Nostalgia for soprano, mixed choir and orchestra (1981)
- Amoretti for voice, lute and viola da gamba (1981–82)
- Pezzo grazioso for wind quintet (1982)
- Madrigali dell’estate for voice and string trio (1984)
- Capriccio per orchestra (1984)
- Sapphic Odes, for mezzo-soprano and large symphony orchestra (1985)
- Musique en quatre scènes for clarinet and string quartet (1987)
- Concerto per violoncello ed orchestra d’archi (1988)
- Jubilate Deo for mixed choir and organ (1988)
- String Quartet No. 3 (1988)
- Chamber Concerto for flute, clarinet, violin, cello, percussion and piano (1989)
- Magic Chimes, a musical fairytale for children (1989)
- From the Book of Night I, II, III for symphony orchestra (1990–2000)
- Sonata per archi (1991)
- Tre intermezzi per trio d’archi (1993–94)
- Musica festeggiante per quartetto d’archi (1995)
- Quodlibet per trio a fiato (1995)
- Tastar e canzona per violoncello e pianoforte (1996)
- Cinq petites valses for piano (1997–98)
- Jeu parti for violin and piano (1998)
- Sinfonietta per archi (1998)
- Concerto per viola ed orchestra d’archi (1998)
- Trio for clarinet, cello and piano (1999)
- Recitativo e la preghiera [I version] for cello and string orchestra (1999)
- Adagio ricordamente [I version] for cello and piano (1999)
- Viva May! 3rd May! for mixed choir a cappella (1999)
- Freedom March for mixed choir a cappella (1999)
- Trio for clarinet, cello and piano (1999–2000)
- Recitativo e la preghiera [II version] for cello and piano (2000)
- Campanae Cracovienses for twenty-five cracovian churches' bells (2000)
- String Quartet No. 4 „Quando resta l’estate” (2001)
- Three interludes for clarinet and piano (2001)
- Felicitamento for string quartet (2001)
- Concertino claricellato for clarinet, cello and string orchestra (2001)
- Adagio ricordamente [II version] for cello and string orchestra (2001)
- Concerto per percussioni ed orchestra (2002)
- Miroir du Temps (Hommage à Olivier Messiaen) for violin, clarinet, cello and piano (2002–2003)

== Honors and awards ==
- 1979 - Prize of the City of Kraków
- 1981 - Second Degree Prize from the Minister of Culture and Arts
- 1984 - Prize of the Polish Composers’ Union
- 1989 - Prize from the Minister of Culture and Arts for his work devoted to children
- 1990 - Prize of the Alfred Jurzykowski Foundation in New York
- 1996 - Prize of the Provincial Governor of the Cracow Province
- 1997 - Prize of the Ruth and Ray Robinsone Foundation 'Excellence in Teaching'
- 1999 - Officer's Cross of the Order of Polonia Restituta
- 2000 - Prize from the Minister of Culture and Arts
- 2001 - Gold Medal from the Minister of National Defence for his 'services for the country's defences'
- 2005 - Medal for Merit to Culture Gloria Artis (posthumously)
