= Zbigniew Bujarski =

Polish composer

- Born: 21 August 1933; Muszyna, Poland
- Died: 13 April 2018 (aged 84); Kraków, Poland
- Occupation: Composer

Zbigniew Bujarski (21 August 1933 – 13 April 2018) was a Polish composer.

== Biography ==
Bujarski was born on 21 August 1933 and died on 13 April 2018 in Kraków. He was born in Muszyna, Poland about 120 kilometres south-west of Kraków, and very close to the border with what is now Slovakia, and studied composition at the State College of Music in Kraków with Stanisław Wiechowicz. He was awarded an honorary mention at the Young Polish Composers' Competition organized by the Polish Composers' Union in 1961, and three years later won 2nd Prize at the Grzegorz Fitelberg Composers' Competition. He went on to teach composition at the Academy of Music in Kraków.

In 2011 Bujarski was awarded the Silver Medal of Medal for Merit to Culture – Gloria Artis by Polish Minister of Culture and National Heritage, Bogdan Zdrojewski.

== Bibliography ==
- Perkowska Małgorzata: Bujarski Zbigniew w: Elżbieta Dziębowska (red.) Encyklopedia muzyczna PWM, cz. biograficzna t. I, Kraków 1979, ISBN 83-224-0113-2
