= Tadeusz Żmudziński =

Polish pianist (1924–1992)

Tadeusz Żmudziński (9 July 1924, in Chorzów – 17 October 1992, in Katowice) was a Polish pianist, and educator.

== Biography ==
In 1946, Żmudziński graduated with highest honours from the University of Music in Katowice, where he studied under Prof. Władysława Markiewiczówna. The following year he took lessons from Imre Ungar, Walter Gieseking and Alfred Cortot. In 1949 he won 12th place at the IV International Chopin Piano Competition.

He gave world premieres of several piano concertos, including those of Bolesław Szabelski (1976), Robert Nessler (1961) and Krzysztof Meyer (1984). He was also famous for playing both Brahms' piano concertos at one recital.

From 1961 he taught at the Academy of Music in Kraków, where his students included Andrzej Pikul and Mariola Cieniawa, from 1973 also in his alma mater in Katowice. Four times (1975, 1980, 1985, 1990) he was a member of the jury in the Chopin and Ferruccio Busoni International Piano Competitions.

== Bibliography ==
- Chopin Institute
- Anna Woźniakowska, Tadeusz Żmudziński. Pianista i nauczyciel ("Tadeusz Żmudziński. Pianist and teacher"). Kraków 2002. ISBN 83-87182-36-2
