= Stanisław Wiechowicz =

Polish composer (1893–1963)

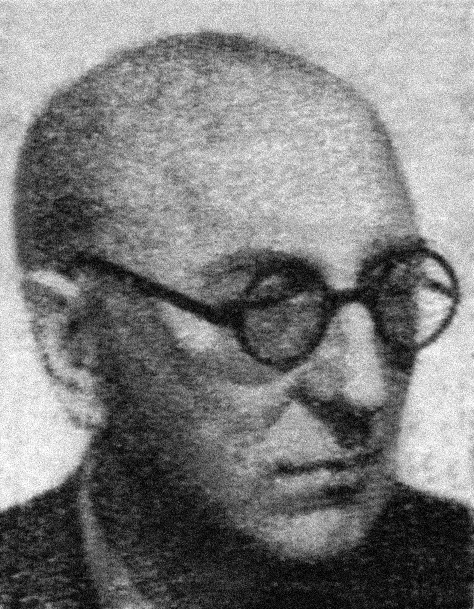
Stanisław Wiechowicz (1893-1963)

Stanisław Wiechowicz (Polish: [staˈɲiswaf vjɛˈxɔvit͡ʂ]; 27 November 1893 – 12 May 1963) was a Polish composer, music conductor, music educator and music critic.

== Biography ==
Stanisław Wiechowicz was born in Kroszyce, near Kielce, Poland. He studied organ at the Conservatory of Music in Kraków and composition at the Institut Jaques-Dalcroze near Dresden. He continued his studies at the Saint Petersburg Conservatory, but his education was interrupted by military service. After demobilization, he worked from 1921 to 1939 as a music teacher and choral conductor in Poznań. From 1926 to 1927 he continued his musical studies at Schola Cantorum in Paris. From 1920 to 1926 and from 1930 to 1939, he was a professor at the Conservatory in Poznań. After 1945, Wiechowicz held the Composition Chair at the State Higher School of Music (now the Academy of Music) in Kraków. Wiechowicz authored a number of works on vocal pedagogy, and wrote for publications including Przegląd Muzyczny and Muzyka Polska. He received a number of composition prizes, and was awarded the Order of Merit of the Republic of Poland in 1952. His work was also part of the music event in the art competition at the 1948 Summer Olympics.

Wiechowicz married Valentina Szaposznikow, and during World War II, he worked as a lawyer. He died in Kraków.

== Works ==
Wiechowicz was a prominent composer of choral music, and often drew inspiration from Polish folk music. Selected works include:

- Babie lato (1922)
- Chmiel na orkiestrę (1927)
- Pastorałki (1927)
- Dzień słowiański (1929)
- Kantata romantyczna (1930)
- Ulęgałki (1944)
- Kasia (1946)
- Na glinianym wazoniku (1947)
- Kantata żniwna (1948)
- Kantata mickiewiczowska (1950)
- Koncert staromiejski (1954)
- Passacaglia i fuga (1960)
- List do Marc Chagalla (1961)
