= Zdzisław Jachimecki =

Polish historian of music and composer (1882–1953)

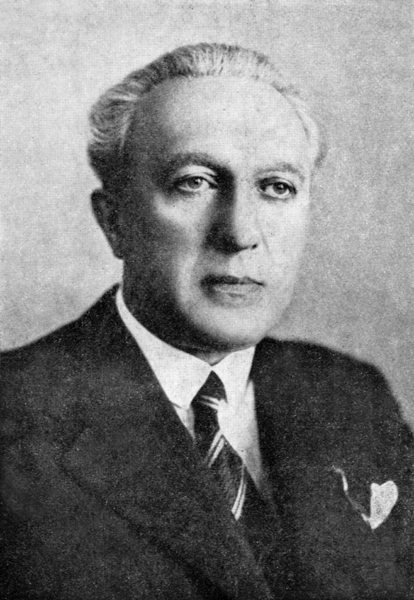
Zdzisław Jachimecki

Zdzisław Jachimecki (Lwów, 7 July 1882 – 27 October 1953, Kraków) was a Polish historian of music, composer, professor at the Jagiellonian University and the Kraków Music Academy, and member of the Polish Academy of Learning.

== Life ==
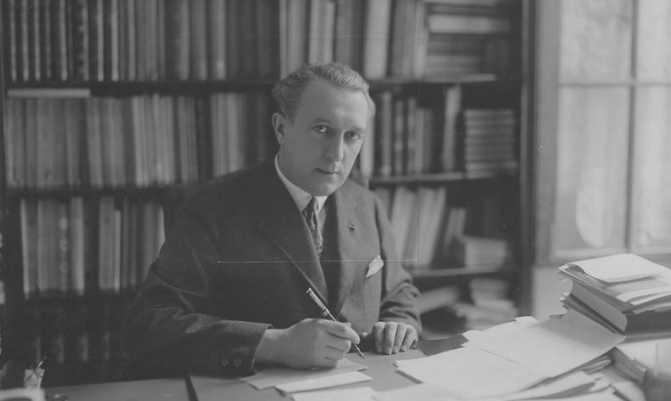
Zdzisław Jachimecki in his study

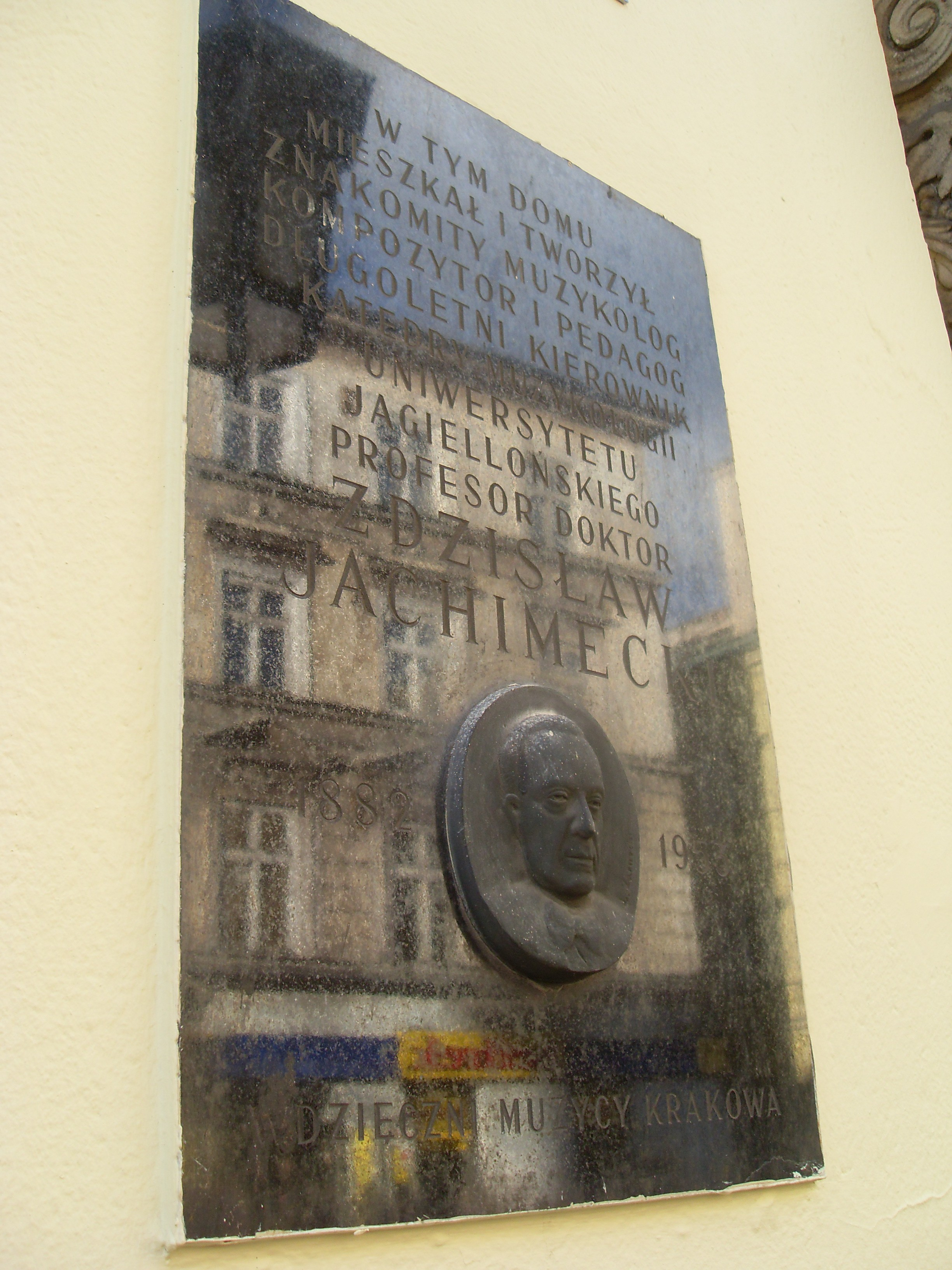
Plaque at ulica Grodzka 47, Kraków, commemorating Jachimecki's residence there

Born in Lwów in 1882, in 1904–5 he studied counterpoint with Arnold Schönberg in Vienna.

== Partial bibliography ==
- Mozart. W 150 rocznicę urodzin (1906)
- Hugo Wolf (1908)
- Józef Haydn (1910)
- Ryszard Wagner (1911)
- Wspomnienia Kurpińskiego (1911)
- Artega i Wagner jako teoretycy dramatu muzycznego (1912)
- Muzyka na dworze króla Władysława Jagiełły, 1424–1430 (1915)
- Moniuszko (1921)
- Fryderyk Chopin (1927)
- Na marginesie pieśni studenckiej z XV-go wieku (1930)
- Nieuwzględnione dotychczas źródło melodii Bogurodzicy (1930)
- Średniowieczne zabytki polskiej kultury muzycznej (1930)
- "Chopin, Fryderyk Franciszek," Polski słownik biograficzny, vol. III, Kraków, Polska Akademia Umiejętności, 1937, pp. 420–26.
- Mikołaj Gomółka i jego poprzednicy w historii muzyki polskiej (1946)
- Muzykologia i piśmiennictwo muzyczne w Polsce (1948)
- Chopin, rys życia i twórczości (1947)
- Z pism (1957–1961, 3 volumes)
- Władysław Żeleński (1959)

== See also ==
- List of Poles
- Chopin
