= Adam Kopyciński =

Polish conductor and composer

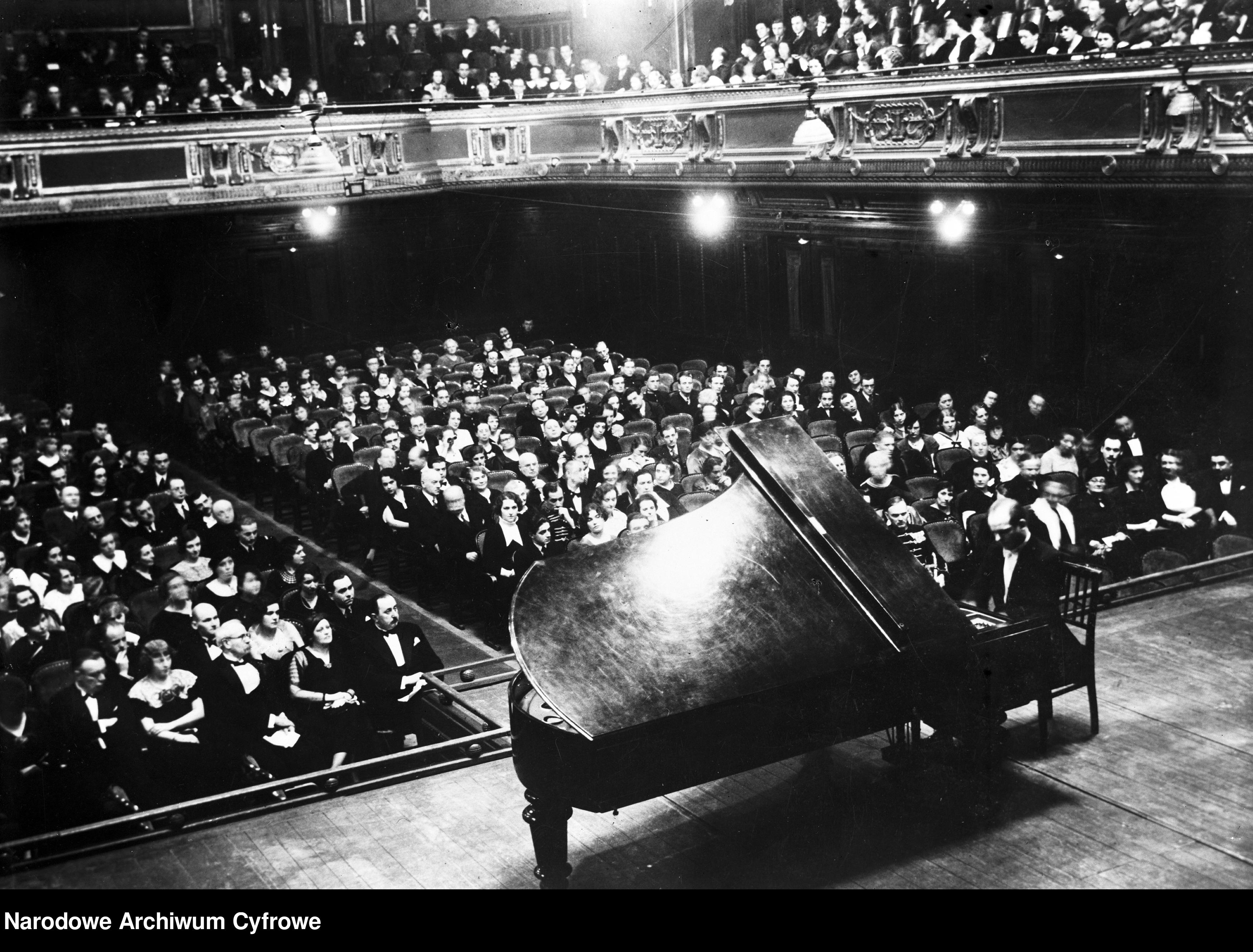

Adam Kopyciński (Polish pronunciation: [ˈadam kɔpɨˈt͡ɕiɲskʲi]; b. 5 August 1907 in Osielec near Maków Podhalański – 3 October 1982 in Wrocław, Poland) was a Polish conductor and composer.

During the Second World War, he was a prisoner in the German concentration camp Auschwitz.
