= Peter Holtslag =

Peter Holtslag (born 1957 in Amsterdam) is a Dutch recorder and flauto traverso virtuoso.

Holtslag studied recorder at the Sweelinck Conservatorium in Amsterdam (now Conservatorium van Amsterdam), Frans Brüggen being his great inspiration, graduating with distinction in 1980. He has toured worldwide as a recorder and flauto traverso player, performing with musicians such as Gustav Leonhardt, William Christie and Roy Goodman, as well as with ensembles such as The English Concert, Orchestra of the 18th Century, Akademie für Alte Musik Berlin, La Fontegara Amsterdam and Trio Noname. He has recorded numerous CDs for major labels, including Hyperion, DGG/Archiv, Globe, Aeolus and Chandos.

In 2011, he recorded a CD on the Aeolus label entitled Awakening Princesses, using original 18th-century recorders from the Bate Collection of Musical Instruments of the University of Oxford as a documentary-research project. In 2016 a Bach CD was released (also on Aeolus), using an original transverse flute from Bach's times.

From 1984 to 1988, Holtslag taught at the Guildhall School of Music in London and was a lecturer at the City University, London. In 1988, he was appointed a professor both at the Royal Academy of Music in London and the Hochschule für Musik und Theater, Hamburg. He was awarded an Honorary Member of the Royal Academy of Music (HonRAM) in 2013.
