= Maria Wiłkomirska =

Polish pianist

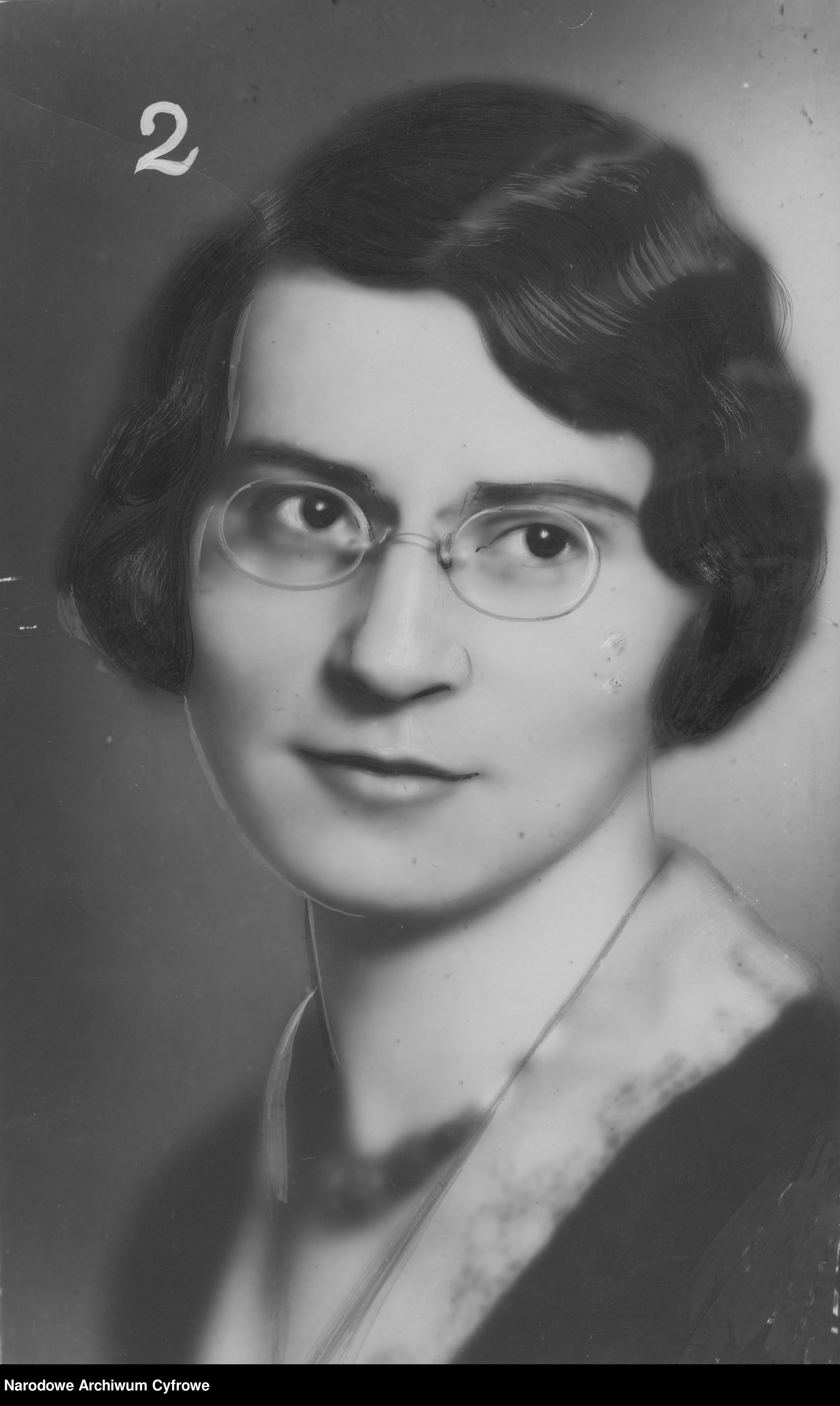
- Maria Wiłkomirska in 1932

Background information
- Born: April 3, 1904; Moscow, Russian Empire
- Died: 19 June 1995 (aged 91) Warsaw, Poland
- Genre: Classical music
- Occupations: Pianist, teacher
- Instrument: Piano
- Formerly of: Trio Wiłkomirskich

Maria Wiłkomirska was a Polish pianist.

Born in Moscow, Wiłkomirska was the daughter of violinist Alfred Wiłkomirski; her half-sister Wanda was a violinist, her half-brother Józef was a conductor, and her brother Kazimierz was a cellist. From 1913 until 1917 she studied at the Moscow Conservatory under Nadezhda Briusova and Boleslav Yavorsky; in 1920 she moved to Warsaw where she became a pupil of Józef Turczyński. She held positions as an instructor in Kalisz, Gdańsk, and Łódź, and in 1951 began teaching at the Chopin University of Music in Warsaw. Wiłkomirska formed a piano trio with Wanda and Kazimierz and toured in Europe and Asia.

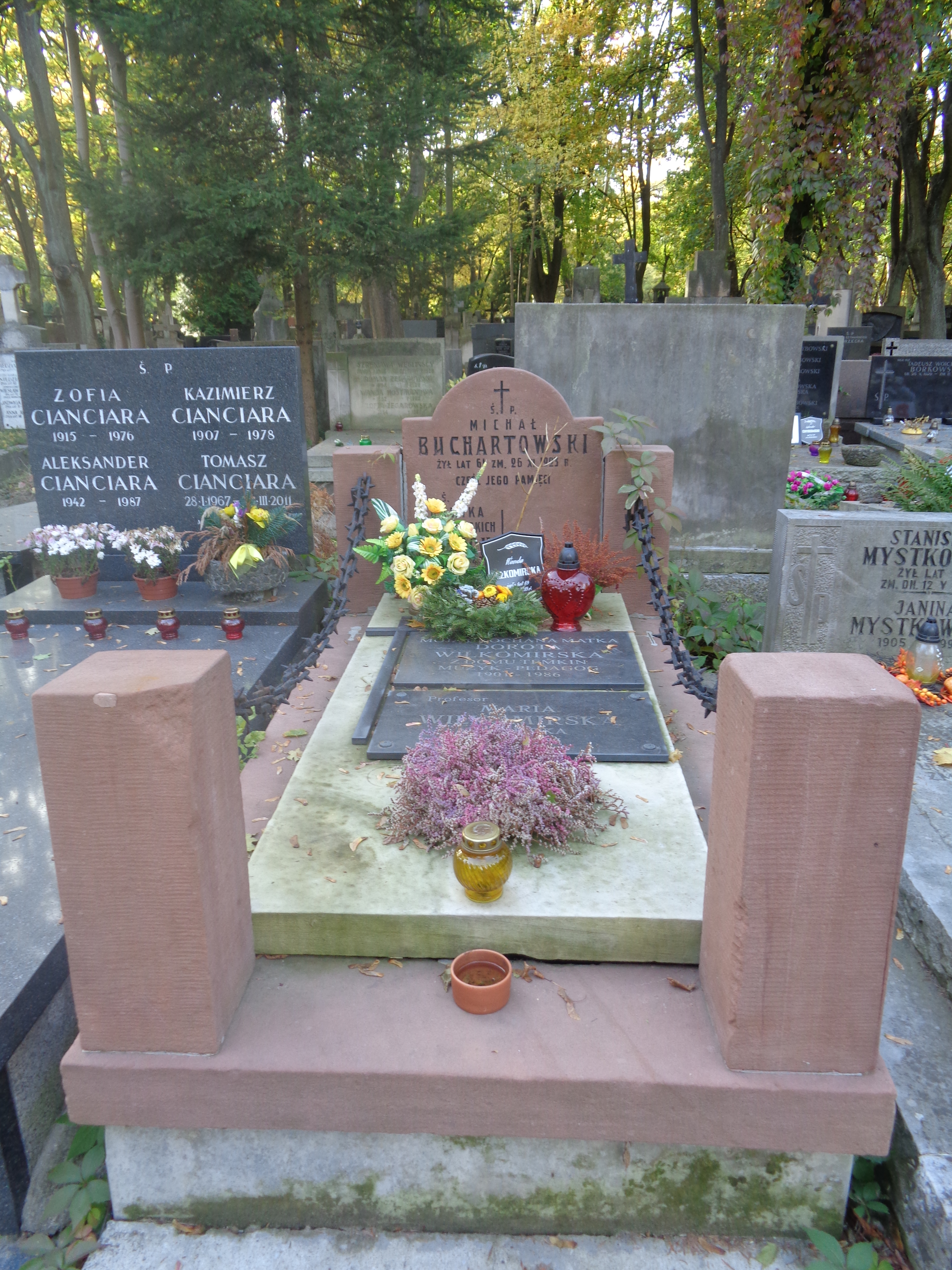
The grave of Maria Wiłkomirska at Powązki Cemetery
