= Jan Hoffman =

Polish pianist & music educator (1906–1995)

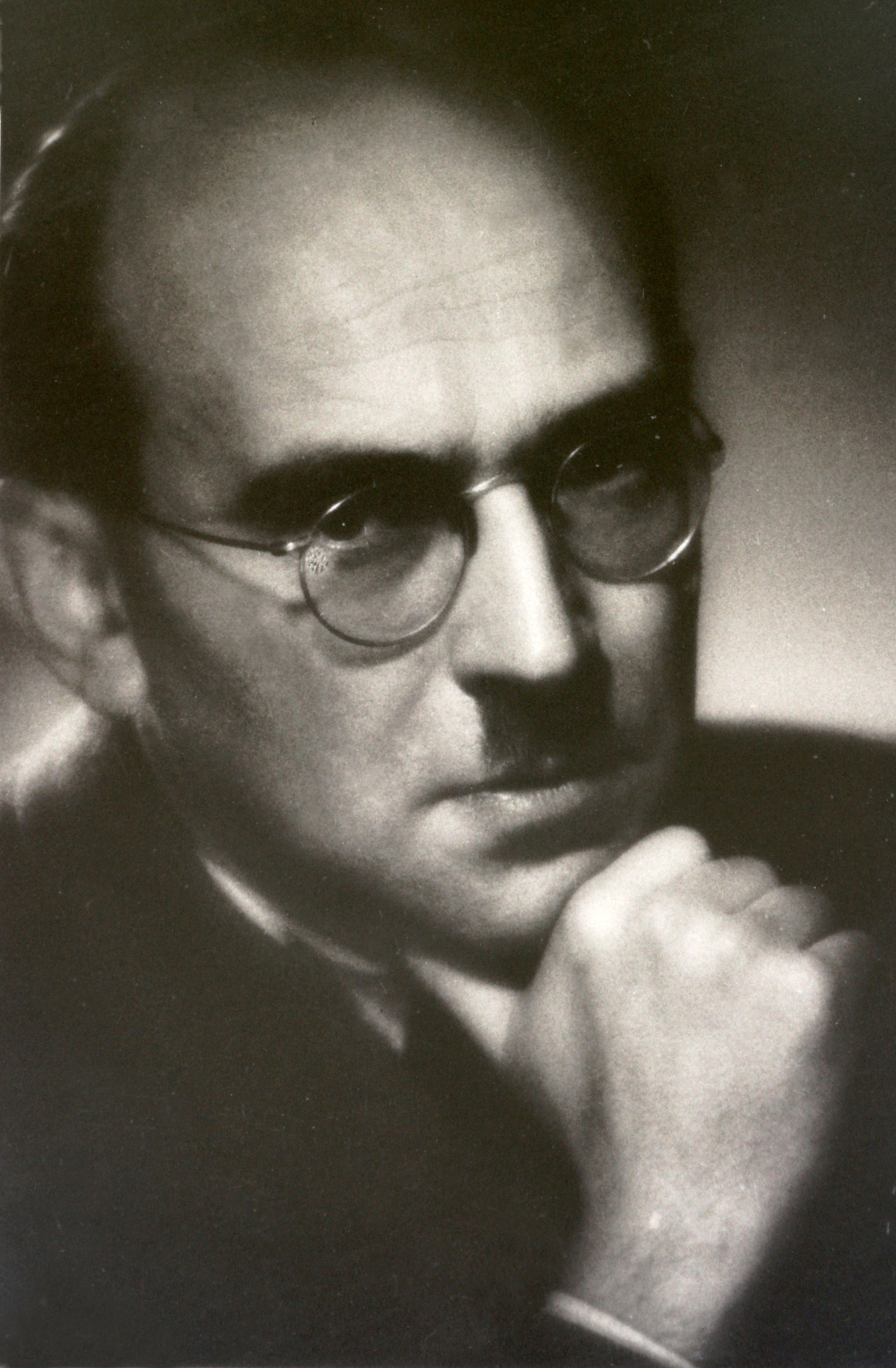
Jan Hoffman

Jan Hoffman (born and died in Kraków, Poland, 11 June 1906 – 25 October 1995) was a Polish pianist and music educator.

== Life ==
Jan Hoffman was born in Kraków, Poland, and studied with Józef Śliwiński and Wiktor Łabuński at the Kraków Conservatory, receiving a diploma in 1928.

He continued his studies in Berlin with Egon Petri and, in Lwów, taught music at the Sabina Kasparek Music School.

After completing his studies, from 1931 to 1933 he was a professor at the Kraków Conservatory. Before World War II, he gave private lessons in Kraków, Bielsko, and Lwów.

In 1941 he was an associate professor at the Krakow Conservatory. During the war years, in secret from the Nazis, he taught, performed, and conducted works by contemporary Polish composers.

After the war, Hoffman cofounded the State Higher School of Music in Kraków (from 1979, the Kraków Academy of Music), serving in a number of positions including dean, department head, vice rector, and—from 1966 to 1968—president. He retired in 1978, but continued teaching, including master classes.

He also served as juror at international piano competitions, was active in the Association of Polish Artists and Musicians, and served on the board of directors of the Fryderyk Chopin Society.

From 1926 to 1968, Hoffman worked at Polish Radio. He also edited a number of publications, including a selection of songs.

He died in 1995 in Kraków.

== Awards ==
- Officer and Commander's Cross with Star of the Order of Polonia Restituta (1950)
- Order of the Banner of Labour
- Distinguished Teacher of the PRL
- Minister of Culture and Art Award (1964, 1968, 1986)

== See also ==
- List of Poles#Music
