= Irena Dubiska =

Polish violinist

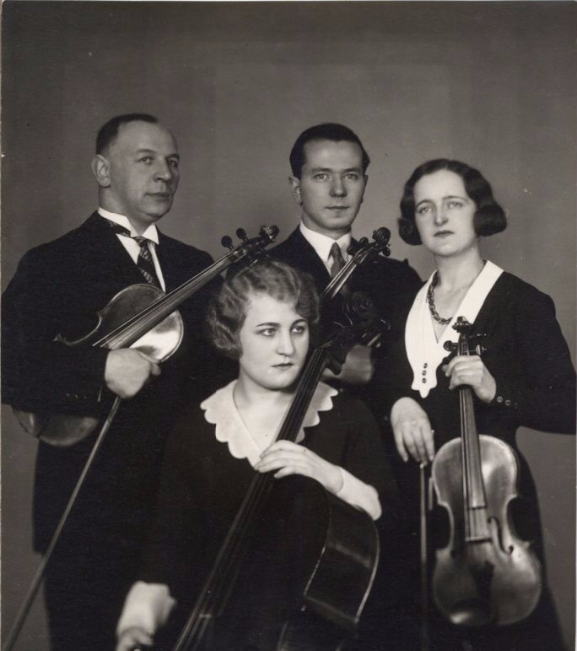
Mieczysław Fliederbaum, Mieczysław Szaleski, Irena Dubiska, Zofia Adamska, 1931

Irena Dubiska (26 September 1899 in Inowrocław – 1 June 1989, Warsaw) was a Polish violinist.

Irena Stanisława Aniela Dubiska was born in Inowrocław to Edmund and Władysława (née Jewasińska); she and her siblings, Ludomira and Aleksander, all had a musical education. Dubiska began studying violin at age 5 with her first teacher, the Bernese violinist Oskar Anderlik, who suggested that she continue studying in Berlin. At age nine she debuted in Wittenberg and later performed in Inowrocław, accompanied by her sister, who had graduated from the Berlin Conservatory and taught at the school, on the piano. Dubiska graduated from the conservatory at age thirteen. She began performing with Polish violinist Bronisław Huberman and they played throughout Germany, Poland, France, and the Netherlands.

Dubiska had begun giving private lessons in 1913 and then taught the violin class at the Warsaw Conservatory. In 1930, Dubiska founded the Polish Quartet (later named the Kwartet im. Karol Szymanowski) with fellow musicians Mieczysław Fliederbaum (violin), Mieczysław Szaleski (viola), and Zofia Adamska (cello). The quartet gave concerts until the outbreak of World War II, during which Dubiska remained in Warsaw, refusing to perform for the occupying Germans, including Hans Frank, then governor of occupied Poland. She played in the hospitals for the wounded during the Warsaw Uprising and later took refuge in Kraków after the uprising, taking her violin, a Guarneri, with her. Dubiska's brother Aleksander continued playing music as an amateur while working as a doctor and hospital director. In 1939, he was murdered by the Nazis for his involvement in the underground. Her sister Ludomisa's son died in the Mauthausen concentration camp.

Following the end of the war, she continued to teach, from 1945 to 1951 at the Academy of Music in Łódź and in parallel at Warsaw, as a full professor from 1956. In 1957 she became the head of the Department of String Instruments at Warsaw, a position she held until 1969. One of her most famous students was violinist Wanda Wiłkomirska.

Dubiska died suddenly on 1 June 1989, shortly after she was brutally attacked in her own home.
