= Academy of Music in Kraków =

The Krzysztof Penderecki Academy of Music in Kraków
- Akademia Muzyczna im. Krzysztofa Pendereckiego w Krakowie
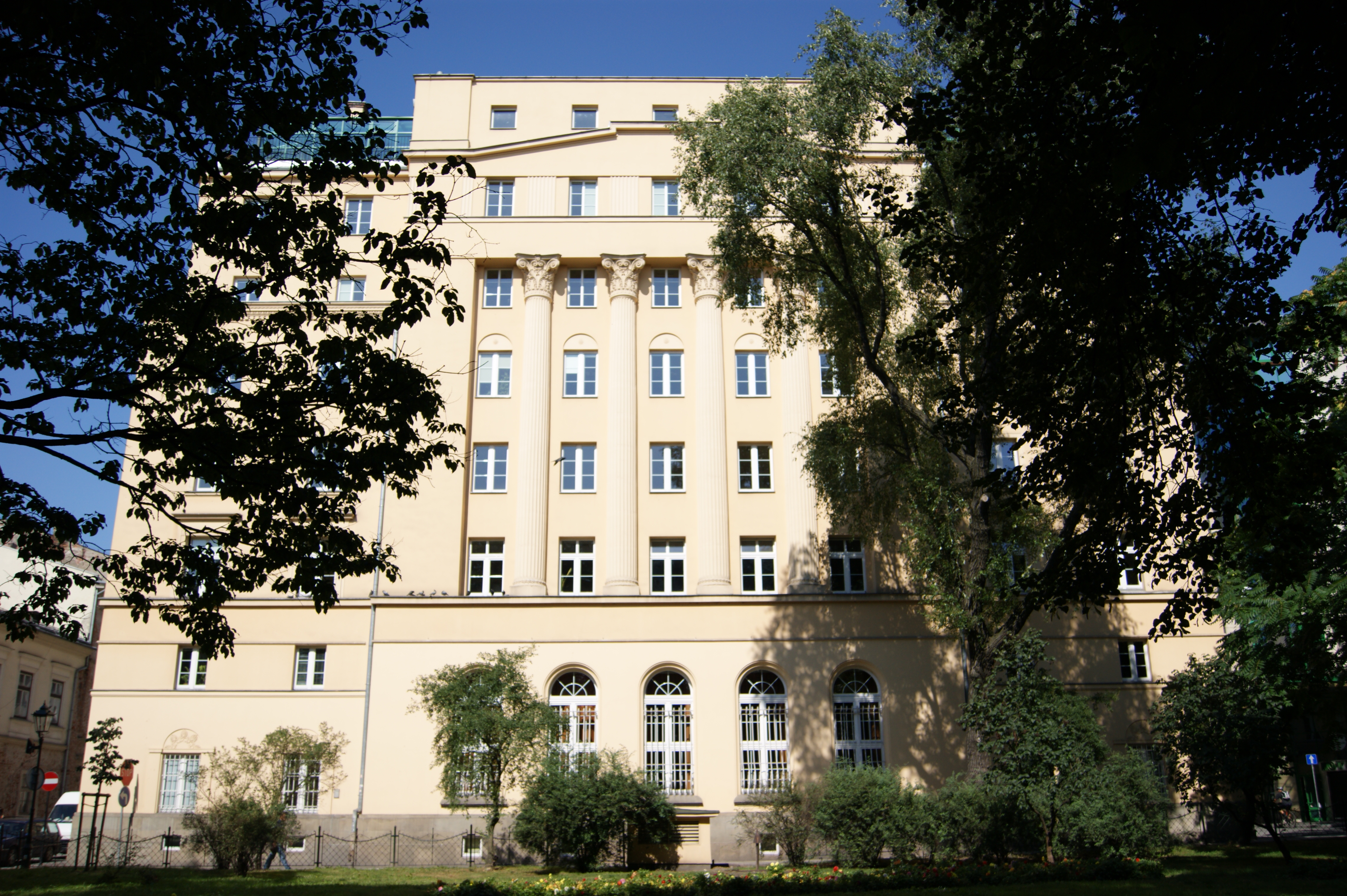
- Academy's main building, on St. Thomas Street in Kraków Old Town (view from Planty Park)

Location
- ul. św. Tomasza 43; Lesser Poland; Kraków, 31-515; Poland; 50°03′42.1″N 19°56′35.9″E

Information
- Motto: "Per Academiam ad astra"
- Founded: 1888
- Founder: Władysław Żeleński
- Status: Public
- Rector: Prof. dr hab. Wojciech Widłak
- Affiliations: The European Association of Conservatoires, Association of Baltic Academies of Music, CEEPUS, Socrates-Erasmus
- Website: www.amuz.krakow.pl

The Krzysztof Penderecki Academy of Music in Kraków (Polish: Akademia Muzyczna im. Krzysztofa Pendereckiego w Krakowie) is a conservatory located in central Kraków, Poland. It is the alma mater of the renowned Polish contemporary composer Krzysztof Penderecki, who was also its rector for 15 years. The academy is the only one in Poland to have two winners of the International Chopin Competition in Warsaw (Halina Czerny-Stefańska and Adam Harasiewicz) as well as a few further prize-winners among its alumni.

== Historical background ==
The academy was founded in 1888 by the eminent Polish composer Władysław Żeleński thanks to his artistic connections and patronage of Princess Marcelina Czartoryska, a concert pianist and former pupil of Frédéric Chopin. Until 1945 it operated as a conservatory under the name of Conservatory of the Music Society or the Cracow Conservatory. During the partitions of Poland, as the region of Lesser Poland and Kraków was ruled by the Austrian Empire – in the late 18th century, it was necessary to gain the consent of the Austrian administration and meet the imperial requirements set for all conservatoires. The newly opened school was inspected by Joseph Dachs and Johann Fuchs, both professors of the Vienna Conservatoire, and received their enthusiastic opinion. It enjoyed a period of great growth in the twenty years between the two wars under directors Wiktor Barabasz and Boleslaw Wallek-Walewski.

The professorial staff included such names as Zbigniew Drzewiecki, Jan Gall, Zdzisław Jachimecki, Egon Petri and Severin Eisenberger.

Closed during the Nazi occupation of 1939–1945, especially after Sonderaktion Krakau in 1939, the conservatoire continued its activity underground and finally reopened on 1 September 1945, becoming the State Higher School of Music as of 1 February 1946 under its first rector, Prof. Zbigniew Drzewiecki. In 1979 it gained the rank of an Academy of Music. On 1 October 2000 the academy inaugurated its new premises at 41–43, St. Thomas Street (ul. Sw. Tomasza).

== Structure ==
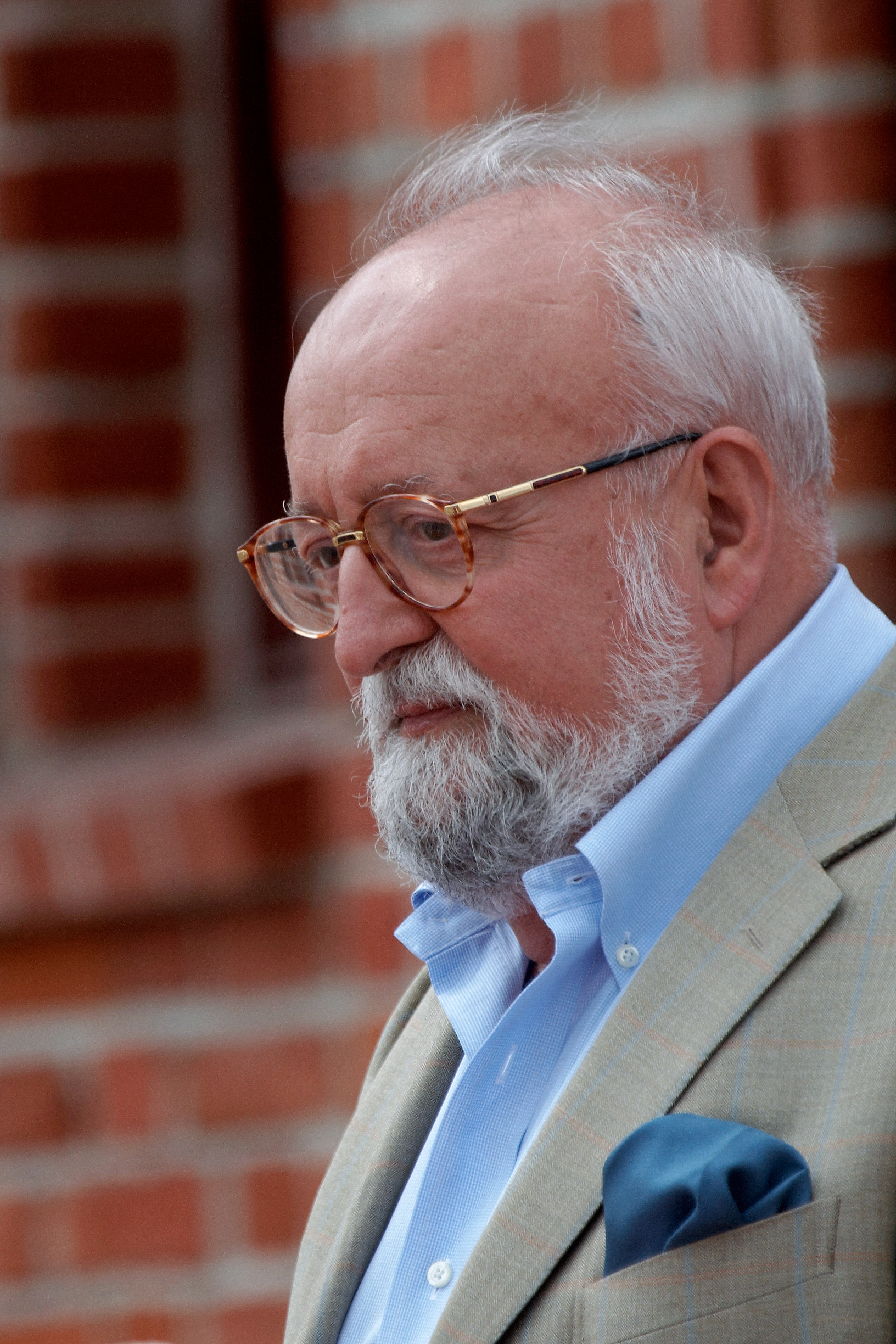
Composer Krzysztof Penderecki (1933-2020)

=== Composition, Interpretation and Music Education Faculty ===
- Composition Department
- Conducting Department
- Music Theory and Interpretation Department
- Music and Education Research Department
- Choral Department
- Religious Music Department
- Electroacoustic Music Studio

=== Instrumental Faculty ===
- Piano Department
- Organ Department
- Early Music Department
- Guitar and Harp Department
- Violin and Viola Department
- Cello and Double Bass Department
- Woodwinds and Accordicon Department
- Brass Department
- Jazz Department
- Percussion and Contemporary Music Department
- Chamber Music Department

=== Voice and Drama Faculty ===
- Voice Department

== People associated with the academy ==
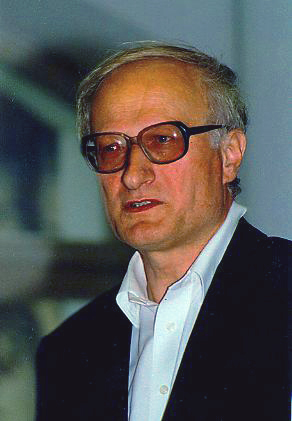
Composer Krzysztof Meyer (b. 1943)

=== Notable alumni ===
The list does not include graduates who later became staff of the Academy.

- Sylvia Čápová-Vizváry, pianist
- Halina Czerny-Stefańska (pianist)
- Janina Garscia (composer)
- Adam Harasiewicz (pianist)
- Jan Hoffman (pianist)
- Kazimierz Kord (conductor)
- Adam Kopyciński (conductor)
- Abel Korzeniowski (film music composer)
- Waldemar Maciszewski (pianist)
- Władysława Markiewiczówna (pianist)
- Elżbieta Szmytka (soprano)
- Wacław Kiełtyka (accordionist, guitarist)

From postgraduate studies

- Lidia Grychtołówna (pianist)
- Wojciech Kilar (composer)
- Marzena Diakun (conductor)

=== Notable faculty ===
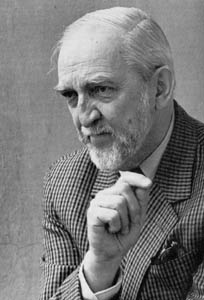
Composer Bogusław Schaeffer (1929-2019)

==== Academics before World War II ====
- Zbigniew Drzewiecki
- Jan Gall
- Zdzisław Jachimecki
- Egon Petri
- Severin Eisenberger

==== Academics after 1945 ====
Also graduated from the academy:

- Marcel Chyrzyński (composer)
- Jerzy Katlewicz (conductor)
- Krzysztof Meyer (composer)
- Krzysztof Penderecki (composer)
- Andrzej Pikul (pianist)
- Paweł Przytocki (conductor)
- Bogusław Schaeffer (composer)
- Stanisław Skrowaczewski (conductor)
- Regina Smendzianka (pianist)
- Jadwiga Szamotulska (pianist)

Non-graduates

- Peter Holtslag (recorder and flauto traverso player)
- Stefan Kisielewski (composer)
- Bolesław Kon (pianist)
- Roman Palester (composer)
- Katarzyna Popowa-Zydroń (pianist)
- Ada Sari (singer)
- Jadwiga Szamotulska (pianist)
- Henryk Sztompka (pianist)
- Eugenia Umińska (violinist)
- Bolesław Woytowicz (composer and pianist)
- Tadeusz Żmudziński (pianist)

=== Doctors honoris causa ===
- 1994 – Krzysztof Penderecki
- 1997 – Paul Sacher
- 2001 – Mieczysław Tomaszewski
- 2003 – Helmuth Rilling
- 2005 – Peter Lukas Graf
- 2007 – Krystyna Moszumańska-Nazar
- 2008 – Henryk Mikołaj Górecki
- 2013 – Paul Badura-Skoda
- 2015 – Pope Benedict XVI
- 2016 – Kaja Danczowska
- 2017 – Iwan Monighetti
- 2019 – Barbara Świątek-Żelazna
- 2022 – Anne-Sophie Mutter

== See also ==
- Culture of Kraków
