= VI Queen Elisabeth Music Competition =

1955 music competition

The sixth edition of the Queen Elisabeth Music Competition took place in 1955 and was the third one devoted to violin. The Soviet violin school couldn't attain a third victory after the successes of David Oistrakh in 1937 and Leonid Kogan in 1951 as Berl Senofsky managed to beat Julian Sitkovetsky. Senofsky remains the only American who has won the violin competition to date.

== Palmares ==
	Winner
1st Prize	(United States) Berl Senofsky
2nd Prize	(Soviet Union) Julian Sitkovetsky
3rd Prize	(France) Pierre Doukan
4th Prize	(France) Francine Dorfeuille-Boussinot
5th Prize	(Soviet Union) Viktor Pikaizen
6th Prize	(Argentina) Alberto Lysy
7th Prize	(Soviet Union) Marina Iashvili
8th Prize	(United Kingdom) Tessa Robbins
9th Prize	(Bulgaria) Luben Yordanoff
10th Prize	(Canada) Clemens Quataker
11th Prize	(Soviet Union) Igor Politkovsky
12th Prize	(Belgium) Marcel Debot

== Jury ==
  - (Turkey) Necil Kazım Akses
  - (France) Yvonne Astruc
  - (Netherlands) Oskar Back
  - (Belgium) Marcel Cuvelier (chairman)
  - (Belgium) Désiré Defauw
  - (France) Zino Francescatti
  - (Japan) Sadanori Maki
  - (United Kingdom) Yehudi Menuhin
  - (United Kingdom) Philip Newman
  - (Argentina) Ricardo Odnoposoff
  - (Soviet Union) David Oistrakh
  - (Switzerland) Alfred Pochon
  - (Belgium) Maurice Raskin
