= Gilels =

Gilels is a surname. Notable people with the surname include:

- Elena Gilels (1948–1996), Russian pianist
- Elizabeth Gilels (1919–2008), Soviet violinist and professor, sister of Emil
- Emil Gilels (1916–1985), Soviet pianist
- Zinaida Gilels (1924–2000), Soviet violinist and pedagogue
