= Sitkovetsky =

Sitkovetsky (Russian: Ситковецкий), feminine: Sitkovetskaya is a Russian-language surname. Alexander Sitkovetsky stated that the surname is most probably of Polish origin. Notable people with this surname include:

- Alexander Sitkovetsky (born 1983), Russian-born British violinist
- Alexander Sitkovetsky (guitarist) (born 1955), Soviet and Russian rock guitarist, singer, and founder of Autograph
- Dmitry Sitkovetsky (born 1954), Soviet and American violinist and conductor
- Julian Sitkovetsky (1925–1958), Soviet violinist
