= II Queen Elisabeth Music Competition =

The second edition of the Queen Elisabeth Music Competition, then known as Eugène Ysaÿe Competition, took place in Brussels from May 15 - May 31, 1938, and was the inaugural edition of its piano competition. It was won by Emil Gilels, whose sister Elizabeth had been awarded the 6th prize the previous year.

Jean Absil composed his Piano Concerto op.30 for the competition.

A third edition devoted to orchestral conducting was scheduled for the following year, but due to the outbreak of World War II the competition's third edition didn't take place until 1951. Eventually, no conducting competition has taken place to date.

== Palmares ==
	Winner
1st Prize	(Soviet Union) Emil Gilels
2nd Prize	(England) Mary Johnstone (Moura Lympany)
3rd Prize	(Soviet Union) Jakov Flier
4th Prize	(England) Lance Dossor
5th Prize	(Uruguay) Nivea Marino-Bellini
6th Prize	(Norway) Robert Riefling
7th Prize	(Italy) Arturo Benedetti Michelangeli
8th Prize	(Belgium) André Dumortier
9th Prize	(Nazi Germany) Rose Schmidt
10th Prize	(France) Monique Yver de la Bruchollerie
11th Prize	(Italy) Marcella Barzetti
12th prize	(France) Colette Gaveau

=== Other competitors ===
- (Georgia (country)) Nikita Magaloff
- (France) Maurice Ohana

== Jury ==
- (Lithuania) Vytautas Bacevicius
- (Soviet Union) Samuil Feinberg
- (England) Arthur Bliss
- (France) Robert Casadesus
- (France) Marcel Ciampi
- (France) Jean Doyen
- (Norway) Arne van Erpekum Sem
- Paul Frenkel
- (Switzerland) Émile Frey
- (Poland) Ignaz Friedman
- (Nazi Germany) Walter Gieseking
- (Nazi Germany) Siegfried Grundeis
- (Australia) Bernard Heinze
- (Belgium) Léon Jongen
- (Poland) Raoul Koczalski
- (Estonia) Artur Lemba
- (Belgium) Marcel Maas
- (Belgium) Carlo Van Neste
- (Soviet Union) Nikolay Orlov
- Pierre Petrides
- (Latvia) Jekabs Poruks
- (Poland) Arthur Rubinstein
- (France) Walter Rummel
- (Nazi Germany) Emil von Sauer
- (Denmark) Victor Schiøler
- (Bulgaria) Andrei Stoyanov
- (Sweden) Olof Wibergh
