= IV Queen Elisabeth Music Competition =

The fourth Queen Elisabeth Music Competition took place in Brussels in 1952. It was the second post-war edition of the competition, which had been resumed the previous year, and the second one devoted to piano, 14 years after the first one took place.

It was won by Leon Fleisher.

== Palmares ==
| | Winner |
|---|---|
| 1st Prize | (United States) Leon Fleisher |
| 2nd Prize | (Switzerland) Karl Engel |
| 3rd Prize | (Italy) Maria Tipo |
| 4th Prize | (Belgium) Frans Brouw |
| 5th Prize | (Australia) Lawrence Davis |
| 6th Prize | (United States) Lamar Crowson |
| 7th Prize | (United States) Theodore Lettvin |
| 8th Prize | (Bulgaria) Yuri Bukov |
| 9th Prize | (France) Jacques Coulaud |
| 10th Prize | (France) Philippe Entremont |
| 11th Prize | (Austria) Hans Graf |
| 12th Prize | (Belgium) Janine Kinet |

== Jury ==
  - (Netherlands) Willem Andriessen
  - (Poland) Stefan Askenase
  - (Belgium) Emile Bosquet
  - Marcelle Cheridjian
  - (England) Harriet Cohen
  - (Italy) Marta de Conciliis
  - (Belgium) Marcel Cuvalier (chairman)
  - (Belgium) René Defossez
  - (United States) Olin Downes
  - (Czechoslovakia) Rudolf Firkušný
  - (Austria) Walter Kerschbaumer
  - (England) Kathleen Long
  - (France) Marguerite Long
  - (Belgium) Carlo Van Neste
  - (Netherlands) Theo van der Pas
  - (Spain) Eduardo del Pueyo
  - (Poland) Arthur Rubinstein
  - Naum Sluszny
  - (Brazil) Magda Tagliaferro
