= Dumortier =

Dumortier is a surname of French origin. People with that name include:

- André Dumortier (1910-2004), Belgian pianist
- Augustin Dumon-Dumortier (1791-1852), Belgian industrialist, diplomat and liberal politician
- Barthélemy Charles Joseph Dumortier (1797-1878), Belgian botanist and Member of Parliament (standard botanical abbreviation Dumortier)
- Eugène Dumortier (1802-1876), French paleontologist
- François-Xavier Dumortier (born 1948), French Roman Catholic priest
