= VIII Queen Elisabeth Music Competition =

The eighth edition of the Queen Elisabeth Music Competition took place in 1957 and was the second one devoted to composition. A specific format in two categories was implanted, and Polish composer Michał Spisak, who had won the inaugural edition, successfully defended the title in the chamber orchestra category.

== Palmares ==
	Works for symphonic orchestra		Works for chamber orchestra	
	Winner	Composition	Winner	Composition
1st Prize	(Italy) Orazio Fiume	Concerto for Orchestra	(Poland) Michał Spisak	Concerto Giocoso
2nd Prize	(Belgium) Marcel Quinet	Variations for Orchestra	(France) Ginette Keller	Fresque
3rd Prize	(Italy) Giorgio Cambissa	Concerto for Orchestra	(Belgium) Albert Delvaux	Esquisses

== Jury ==
- (Belgium) Jean Absil
- (France) Tony Aubin
- (Belgium) Raymond Chevreuille
- (Belgium) Marcel Cuvalier (secretary)
- (Spain) Óscar Esplá
- (Germany) Karl Amadeus Hartmann
- (Netherlands) Guillaume Landré
- (Belgium) Vic Legley
- (Italy) Gian Francesco Malipiero
- (Russia) (United States) Nicolas Nabokov
- (Belgium) Robert Oboussier
- (Belgium) Marcel Poot
- (France) Francis Poulenc
- (United States) Virgil Thomson
