= Pavel Vernikov =

Pavel Vernikov Павло Верніков
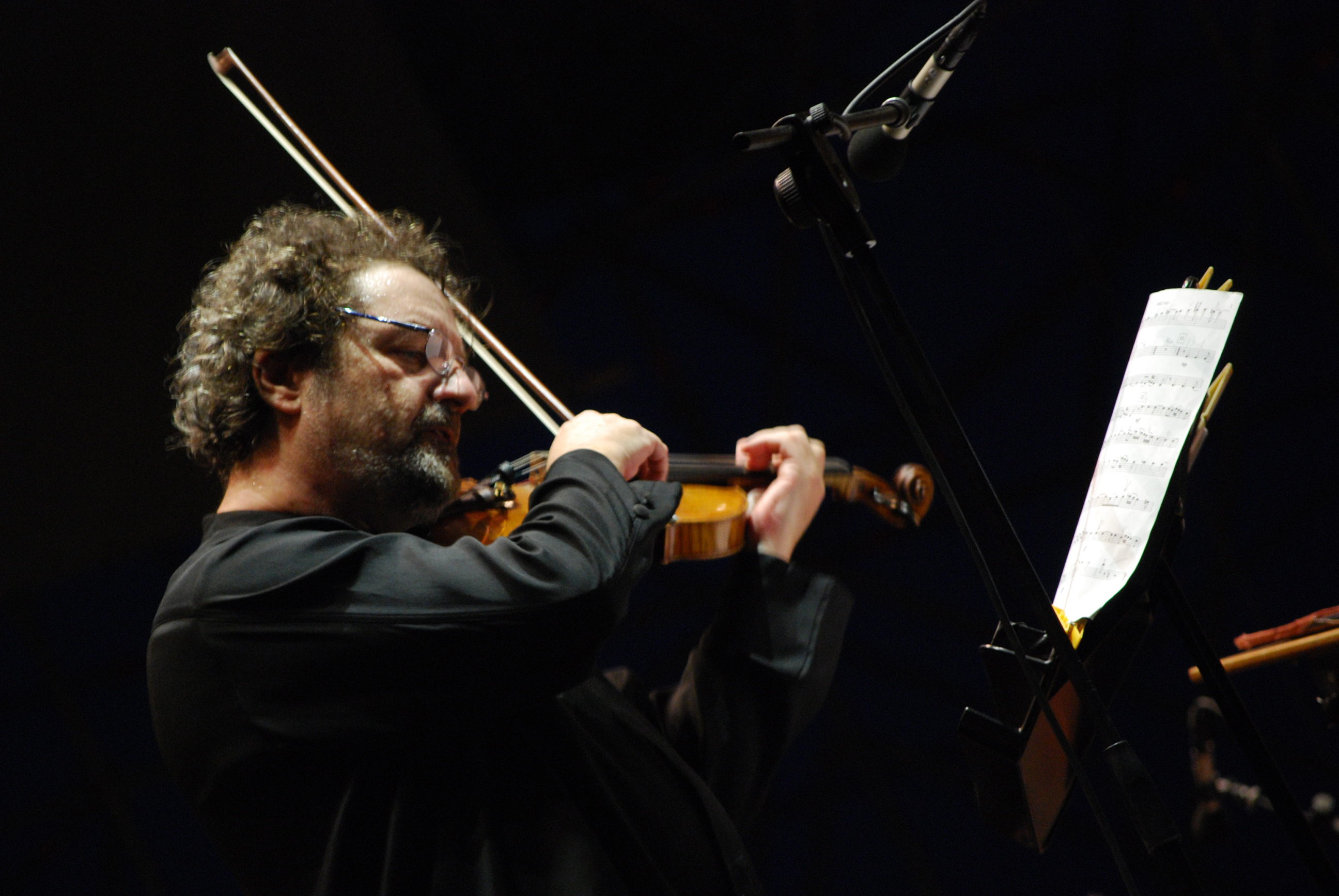

Background information
- Birth name: Pavlo Vernikov
- Born: 1953 (age 71–72); Odessa, Ukrainian SSR, Soviet Union
- Genres: Classical
- Occupation: Violinist
- Instrument: Violin

Pavel Vernikov (Note: Ukrainian: Павло Верніков, romanized: Pavlo Vernikov, russified: Pavel) (born 1953) is a Ukrainian violinist, a member of Vienna University and a winner of Munich International Competition.

== Biography ==
Vernikov was born in Odesa where he graduated from the Stolyarsky Music School where he studied with the Mordkovich brothers under the mentorship of Semyon Snitkovsky at the Tchaikovsky Conservatory. Later on, he participated in various Violin Competitions in both Germany (Munich) and Italy (Florence) and since then appeared worldwide in such places as both Carnegie Hall and Kennedy Center in New York, London's Wigmore Hall and many others.

He is partner with such violinists and pianists as Sviatoslav Richter, James Galway, Maria Tipo, Oleg Kagan, Julian Rachlin, Janine Jansen, Andres Mustonen, Frans Helmerson, and many others. During his life he served as an artistic director at various Chamber Music Festivals such as in Eilat, Israel; Dubrovnik, Yugoslavia and Gubbio, Italy. Currently he teaches violin at the Queen Sofía College of Music in Madrid, Spain, Keshet Eilon in Israel, Kronberg Academy in Germany and others.

He also participated in many international violin competitions and later on became a professor at the Conservatoire national supérieur de musique et de danse de Lyon where he teaches at the Vienna-based Music and Arts University of the City of Vienna and Swiss University of Lausanne. Pavel Vernikov is currently playing Guadagnini in Piacenza. On Thursday December 8, 2016, his Guadagnini was stolen from Pavel while he was disembarking from a train in Geneva, Switzerland. As of December 29, 2016 it has not been recovered. He also was a leader of the Chamber Orchestra of Europe and is a winner of many prizes from various violin competitions.
