= Stanislav Igolinsky =

Russian pianist

Stanislav Grigoryevich Igolinsky (Russian: Иголинский, Станислав Григорьевич, born 1954, in Saratov) is a Russian pianist.

He is a Honored Artist of Russia.

Record of piano prizes
Year	Competition	Prize	Ex-aequo with...	1st prize winner
1972	(Soviet Union) All-Union Competition, Minsk'72	1st prize		
1974	(Soviet Union) V P. I. Tchaikovsky, Moscow	2nd prize	(South Korea) Myung-Whun Chung	(Soviet Union) Andrey Gavrilov
1975	(Belgium) VIII Queen Elisabeth, Brussels	2nd prize		(Soviet Union) Mikhail Faerman
