= Plamena Mangova =

Bulgarian pianist

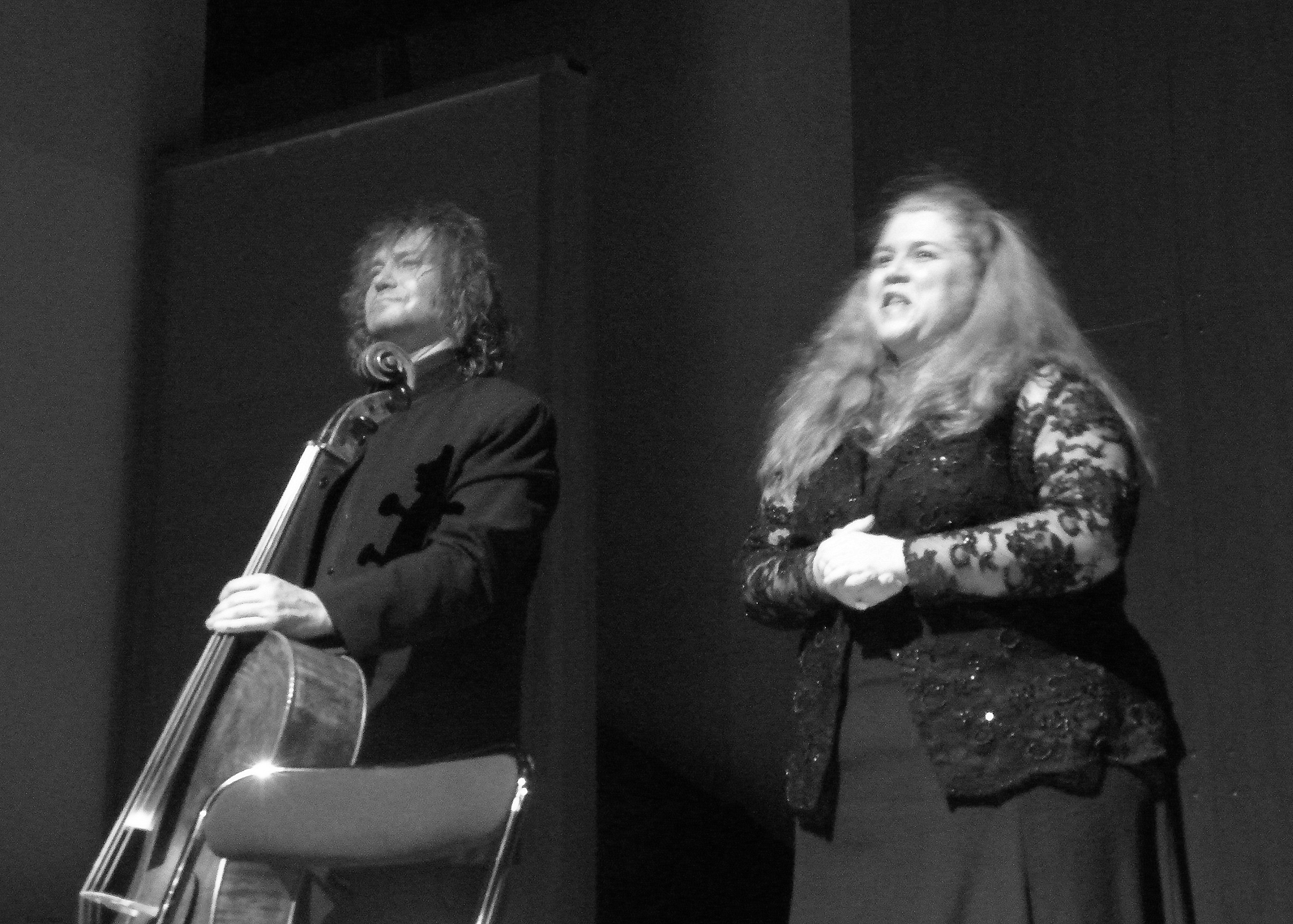
- Mangova with Alexander Kniazev during la Folle Journée 2009.

Background information
- Born: 1980 (age 44–45); Pleven, Bulgaria
- Genres: Classical
- Occupation: Pianist
- Instrument: Piano

Plamena Mangova (born in Pleven, Bulgaria, 1980) is a classical pianist.

Mangova studied with Marina Kapatsinskaya at the State Music Academy in Sofia. She went on to study with Dmitri Bashkirov at the Reina Sofía School of Music in Madrid, and with Abdel Rahman El Bacha at the Queen Elisabeth Music Chapel.

At 18, she was awarded the XIV Paloma O'Shea Santander International Piano Competition's third prize. Nine years later she took part at the XVI Queen Elisabeth International Music Competition, where she was second to Anna Vinnitskaya.

Mangova has been active as a concert pianist at an international level since 2000, when she debuted at Paris' Théâtre du Châtelet. Her first CD, a Dmitri Shostakovich monographic, was awarded a Diapason d'Or. As a chamber musician she has recorded Sergey Prokofiev's complete works for violin and piano, plus Shostakovich's Piano Quintet, featured in the aforementioned recording.

Mangova's recording of Beethoven's Appassionata were used in the third season of the television series Fargo.
