= Arturo Benedetti Michelangeli =

Italian pianist

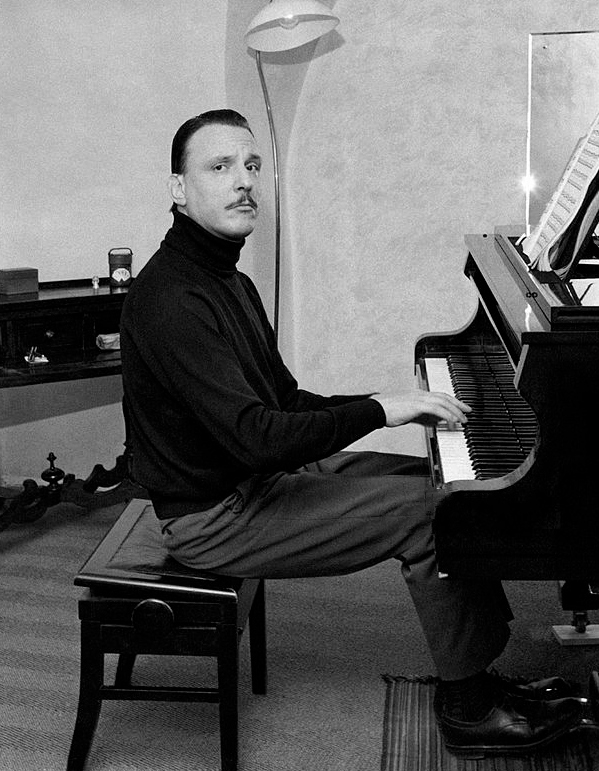
Arturo Benedetti Michelangeli at the piano (1960)

Arturo Benedetti Michelangeli (Italian: [arˈtuːro beneˈdetti mikeˈlandʒeli]; 5 January 1920 – 12 June 1995) was an Italian classical pianist. He is considered one of the greatest pianists of the twentieth century. According to The New York Times, he was perhaps the most reclusive, enigmatic and obsessive among the handful of the world's legendary pianists.

== Early life and studies ==
Benedetti Michelangeli was born near Brescia, in Italy. His date of birth is usually given as 5 January 1920. He himself once said that he was born 'during the first hour of the morning of 6 January 1920'. His father, who was a count and a lawyer by profession, was also a musician and a composer and began teaching music to Benedetti Michelangeli before he was four years old. Benedetti Michelangeli learned to play the violin at the age of three and would later study the instrument at the Venturi Institute in Brescia before switching to piano under Dr. Paolo Chimeri, who accepted him into his class following an audition. He also studied organ and composition. When he was nine, he began having private lessons with Giovanni Anfossi in Milan.

At ten years old, Benedetti Michelangeli began his formal music education at the Milan Conservatory, where he graduated with honours at the age of 14. Although Benedetti Michelangeli's parents were passionate about music, they did not want Arturo to become a pianist. In view of his family's attitude Benedetti Michelangeli studied medicine for several years although he never set music aside and continued to play regularly.

== Professional career ==
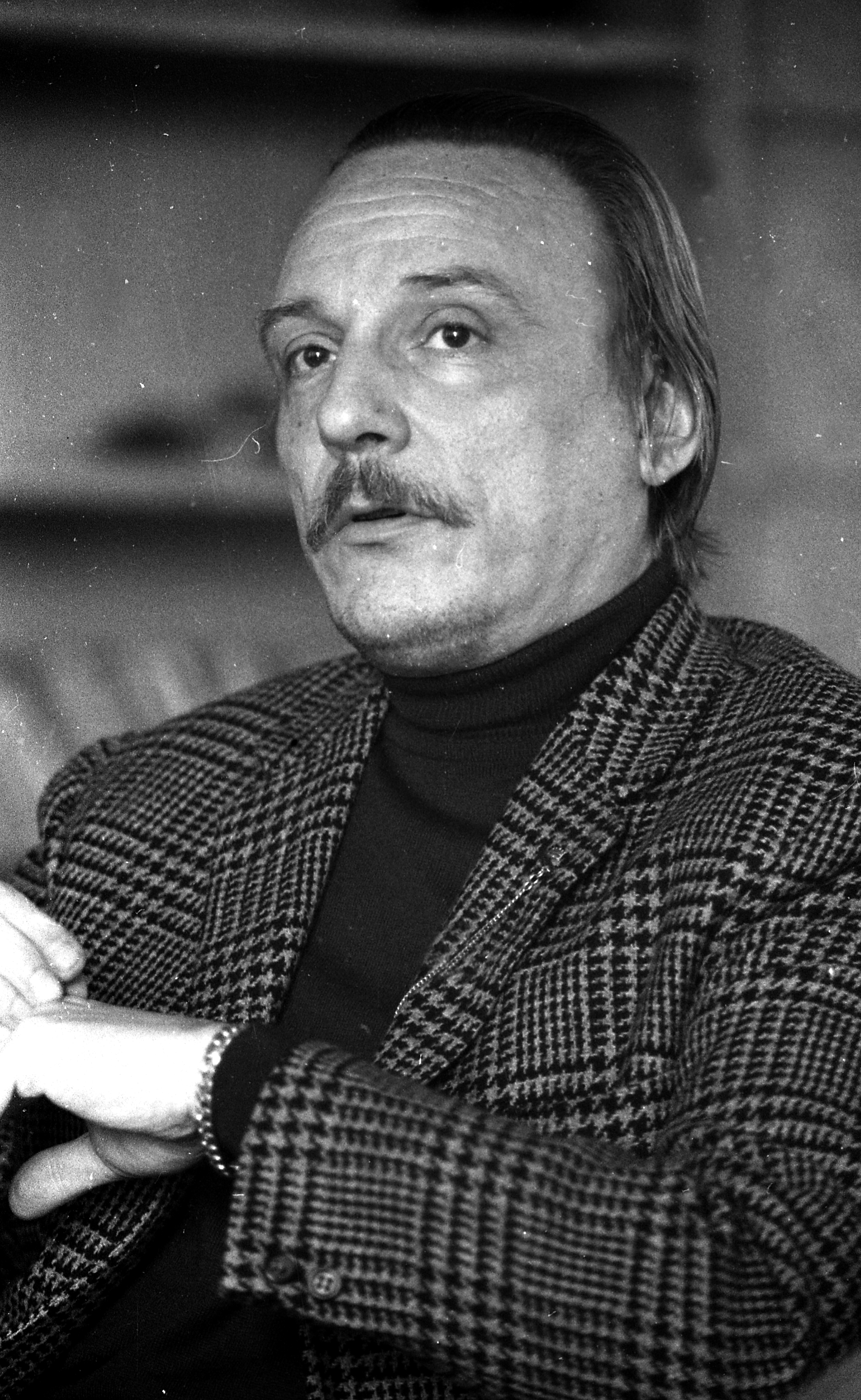
Michelangeli (1969)

In May 1938, at the age of eighteen, Michelangeli began his international career by entering the Ysaÿe International Festival in Brussels, Belgium, where he finished seventh. A brief account of the competition, at which Emil Gilels took first prize and Moura Lympany second, is given by Arthur Rubinstein, who was one of the judges. According to Rubinstein, Benedetti Michelangeli gave "an unsatisfactory performance, but already showed his impeccable technique." A year later he won the first prize in the Geneva International Music Competition, where he was acclaimed as "a new Liszt" by pianist Alfred Cortot, a member of the judging panel, which was presided over by Ignacy Jan Paderewski. After Michelangeli won the competition, Benito Mussolini gave him a teaching position at the Martini Conservatory in Bologna, Italy.

The outbreak of World War II interrupted Michelangeli's career just as it had begun. Despite future Queen of Italy Maria José Savoia's efforts to exonerate him from the army, Michelangeli was drafted. He joined the Italian airforce, and as soon as the war was over, returned to music. After a long break, his first appearance was in Warsaw during the 5th Chopin Festival, where he dropped out of the competition in protest as Vladimir Ashkenazy, who he believed should have won, finished second to Adam Harasiewicz by a small margin. In 1948 Michelangeli toured the United States for the first time, making his orchestral debut at Carnegie Hall in November, performing Schumann's Piano Concerto in A minor Op. 54 with the New York Philharmonic and Dimitri Mitropoulos. In January 1949 he made his solo debut at Carnegie Hall. Following his spell at Conservatorio in Bologna, Michelangeli's teaching activity continued in Venice, Berlin, Geneva and Budapest. His concept of training students to become professional piano concertists was unorthodox but successful, and he taught for several years in Bozen, and from 1952 to 1964 in Arezzo (with a break caused by ill health between 1953 and 1955). The courses eventually resulted in the foundation of the Arturo Benedetti Michelangeli International Piano Academy, which was to be organized by the city and provincial authorities in Arezzo, in cooperation with the 'Amici della Musica' Society. Unfortunately, the project did not come to fruition. He ran further courses in Moncalieri, Siena, and Lugano, and from 1967 he gave private tuitions at a Rabbi in his Alpine villa in the province of Trento.

External videos
- Michelangeli performing Maurice Ravel's Piano Concerto in G major (London, Apr 1982) accompanied by Sergiu Celibidache and the London Symphony Orchestra.

In 1988, Michelangeli suffered a ruptured abdominal aneurysm during a concert in Bordeaux. After more than seven hours of surgery, he overcame this health issue. A few months later, on 7 June 1989, he played Mozart concertos Nos. 20 and 25 with the Symphony Orchestra of Norddeutscher Rundfunk (NDR) conducted by Cord Garben. In 1990, he again recorded two Mozart concertos, KV. 415 and KV. 503 in Bremen. Michelangeli's last public performance was held in Hamburg on 7 May 1993.

As a composer, Benedetti Michelangeli arranged 19 Italian folk songs a cappella for the Coro della Società Alpinisti Tridentini and a men's chorus from Trento (Italy). A recording of these pieces are available on the DIVOX music label.

Benedetti Michelangeli's students included Maurizio Pollini, Martha Argerich, Ivan Moravec, Paul Stewart, Aldo Antognazzi, Vladimir Krpan, Lucia Passaglia and Carlo Dominici.

Sergiu Celibidache considered Benedetti Michelangeli a fellow conductor, and not merely a pianist: "Michelangeli makes colors; he is a conductor." Celibidache also described Michelangeli as one of the "greatest living artists".

Teacher and commentator David Dubal argued that Benedetti Michelangeli was at his best when he performed the earlier works of Beethoven but seemed insecure with Chopin. He added that Benedetti Michelangeli was "demonic" in works such as the Bach-Busoni Chaconne and Brahms's Paganini Variations.

Benedetti Michelangeli's highlights include the (authorized) live performances in London of Ravel's Gaspard de la nuit, Chopin's Mazurkas and Sonata No. 2, Schumann's Carnaval, Op. 9 and Faschingsschwank aus Wien, Op. 26 as well as various recordings of Beethoven's Piano Concerto No. 5, Liszt's Piano Concerto No. 1 and Totentanz, Ravel's Piano Concerto in G major, and the piano concertos of Robert Schumann, and Edvard Grieg.

== Personal life ==
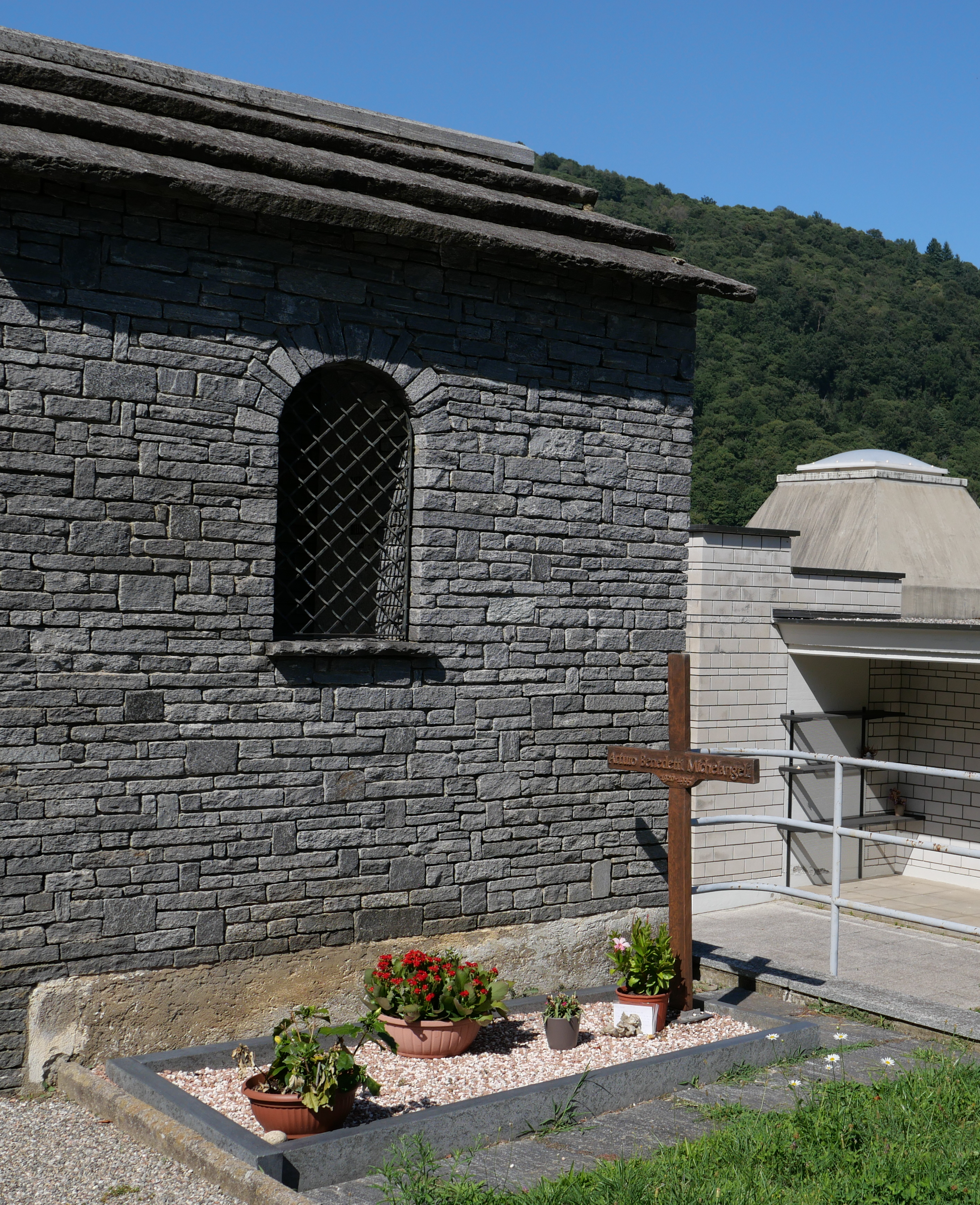
The grave in 2025.

On 20 September 1943 Benedetti Michelangeli married pianist Giulia Linda Guidetti, who was a pupil of his father. They lived in Bornato, near Brescia, Bolzano and Arezzo. They separated in 1970. In the 1970s Michelangeli lived in Switzerland and refused to live or perform in his native Italy for over a decade.

Following his divorce, his secretary, and later his agent and partner, Marie-José Gros-Dubois organized concerts and dates for him, and also presided over his financial affairs.

In an interview, Gros-Dubois recalled that Benedetti Michelangeli could not believe his musical career was so financially successful. After a concert, she reported that he gloomily said: "You see, so much applause, so much public. Then, in half an hour, you feel alone more than before."

Benedetti Michelangeli was obsessed with piano mechanics and insisted that his concert instruments be in perfect condition. His last concert took place on 7 May 1993 in Hamburg, Germany. After a long illness he died on 12 June 1995 in Lugano, Switzerland. He is buried in nearby Pura.

== Racing career ==
Michelangeli was a three-time competitor in the Mille Miglia road race.

== Awards and recognition ==
- Queen Elisabeth Competition: Seventh Prize (1938)
- Geneva International Competition: First Prize (1939)
- 15th Annual Grammy Awards Best Classical Performance – Instrumental Soloist or Soloists (Without Orchestra): Nomination (1972)

Debussy: Images, Books 1 And 2 and Children's Corner Suite (Album)

- 18th Annual Grammy Awards Best Classical Performance – Instrumental Soloist or Soloists (Without Orchestra): Nomination (1975)

Schumann: Carnaval, Op. 9 (Album)

Michelangeli was chosen by an international panel as the official pianist for the 100th anniversary of Chopin's death (1949).

== The International Piano Festival of Brescia and Bergamo ==
In 1962, the 'Amici della Musica' Society in Arezzo organized the first Benedetti Michelangeli Festival. Michelangeli's pupils took part, giving concerts in various locations in Tuscany. The festival concluded with a performance in Arezzo by Michelangeli himself. A similar event took place the following year.

In 1964, Benedetti Michelangeli founded the International Piano Festival of Brescia and Bergamo – one of the major world events dedicated to piano music, intended both as a solo instrument and as an orchestra interlocutor.

From 1964, the festival moved to Brescia and Bergamo, and Michelangeli remained its artistic director for about three years. Pianists appearing at the festival include Magaloff, Richter, Arrau, Pollini, Ashkenazy, Radu Lupu, Zimerman, Brendel, Martha Argerich, Evgeny Kissin, Grigory Sokolov, and instrumentalists, singers and conductors such as Mstislav Rostropovich, Mischa Maisky, Uto Ughi, Luciano Pavarotti, Riccardo Muti, Claudio Abbado, Gergiev, Giulini, Sawallisch, Solti, Maazel and Chung.

== Recordings ==
External audio
- You may hear Michelangeli performing Sergei Rachmaninoff's Piano Concerto No. 4 (London, November 1957) accompanied by Ettore Gracis and the Philharmonia Orchestra Here on archive.org

Date of Recording	Album Details	Collaborating Artists	Record Label	Catalogue No.
1957	Ravel: Piano Concerto in G major, M. 83; Rachmaninoff: Piano Concerto No. 4 in G minor, Op. 40	Ettore Gracis	EMI	
1966	Bach-Busoni: Chaconne from Partita for Solo Violin No. 2, BWV 1004; Brahms: Variations on a theme of Paganini, Op. 35; Mozart: Piano Concerto No. 15 in B♭ major, K. 450	Ettore Gracis	EMI	
1971	Beethoven: Piano Sonata No. 4 in E flat major, Op. 7		Deutsche Grammophon	
1971	Debussy: Images Volumes 1-2, Children's Corner		Deutsche Grammophon	
1972	Chopin: Mazurkas (10), Preludes Op. 45, Ballade No. 1, Scherzo No. 2		Deutsche Grammophon	
1975	Haydn: Piano Concerto No. 4 in G major, Hob. XVIII:4; Piano Concerto No. 11 in D major, Hob. XVIII:11	Edmond de Stoutz	EMI	
1978	Debussy: Préludes Volume 1		Deutsche Grammophon	
1980	Beethoven: Piano Concerto No. 1 in C major, Op. 15	Carlo Maria Giulini	Deutsche Grammophon	
1981	Brahms: Ballades, Op. 10; Schubert: Piano Sonata in A minor, D. 537		Deutsche Grammophon	
1981	Schumann: Carnaval, Faschingsschwank aus Wien		Deutsche Grammophon	
1982	Beethoven: Piano Concerto No. 5 in E flat major, Op. 73, "Emperor"	Carlo Maria Giulini	Deutsche Grammophon	
1987	Beethoven: Piano Concerto No. 3 in C minor, Op. 37	Carlo Maria Giulini	Deutsche Grammophon	
1988	Debussy: Préludes Volume 2		Deutsche Grammophon	
1989	Mozart: Piano Concerto No. 20 in D minor, K. 466; Piano Concerto No. 25 in C major, K. 503	Cord Garben	Deutsche Grammophon	
1990	Mozart: Piano Concerto No. 13 in C major, K. 415; Piano Concerto No. 15 in B♭ major, K. 450	Cord Garben	Deutsche Grammophon	
