= Anna Vinnitskaya =

Russian pianist

- Born: 4 August 1983 (age 41); Novorossiysk, Soviet Union
- Genres: Classical
- Occupation: Classical concert pianist
- Instrument: Piano
- Years active: 1997-present

Anna Vinnitskaya (Russian: Анна Валерьевна Винницкая; born 4 August 1983, in Novorossiysk) is a Russian pianist who won the 2007 Queen Elisabeth Music Competition.

== Biography ==
Anna Vinnitskaya was born in Novorossiysk. She began piano lessons at age 6. From 1995 to 2001, she studied at the Rachmaninoff Conservatory in Rostov-on-Don with Sergei Ossipenko, then at the Hochschule für Musik und Theater in Hamburg, where she studied with Evgeni Koroliov. As a soloist, she has appeared with such ensembles as the Gewandhaus Orchestra, Moscow Symphony Orchestra, the Budapest Festival Orchestra, the Boston Symphony, the NHK Symphony Orchestra Tokyo, l'Orchestre Philharmonique de Radio France, and the Berliner Philharmoniker, and has given recitals all around Europe.

She entered the competition circuit at age 13, winning first prize at the International Junoshenki competition. In 2000 she achieved a third place at the Monza Competition and two years later first place at the Jaèn Competition, where she also won the Audience Award. This was followed with a first prize at the Elise Meyer Competition in Hamburg in 2004, and the fourth prize in the Ferruccio Busoni International Competition in Bolzano in 2005.

On 2 June 2007, she won first prize in the Queen Elisabeth Music Competition in Brussels. After a memorable Gaspard de la nuit (Ravel) in the first rounds, she impressed the audience and jury in the final round with Beethoven's Sonata No.13 in E flat "Quasi una fantasia", Op. 27 No.1; the compulsory work La Luna y la Muerte by Miguel Gálvez-Taroncher; and the Piano Concerto No.2 by Sergei Prokofiev. Vinnitskaya was only the second woman in the history of the competition for piano to win the first prize, after Ekaterina Novitskaya in 1968.

Anna Vinnitskaya was appointed professor of piano at her alma mater at the Hochschule für Musik und Theater, Hamburg, in 2009.

== Prizes ==
- International Junoshenki competition – First prize (1995)
- Monza Competition – Third prize (2000)
- Jaèn Competition – First prize/Audience Award (2002)
- Elise Meyer Competition (Hamburg) – First prize (2004)
- International Ferruccio Busoni Competition (Bolzano) – Fourth prize (2005)
- Queen Elisabeth Music Competition for Piano (Brussels) – First prize (2007)
