= Orchestre de l'Opéra national de Paris =

French symphonic orchestra

- Orchestra
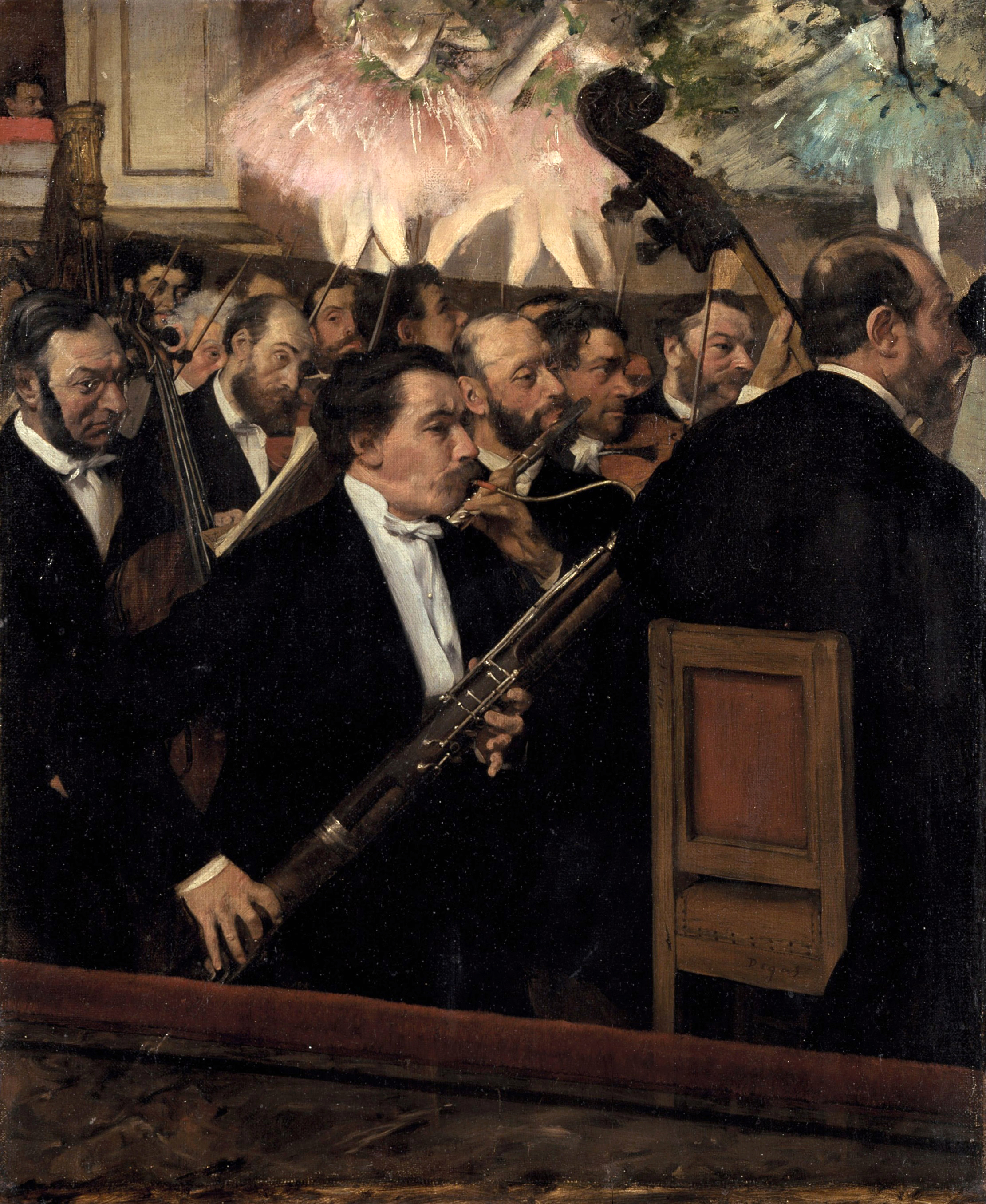
- L'Orchestre de l'Opéra (1868–69), Edgar Degas, Musée d'Orsay, Paris
- Founded: 1672
- Location: Paris, France
- Concert hall: Opéra national de Paris
- Music director: vacant

The Orchestre de l'Opéra national de Paris is a French Symphonic Orchestra dating from 1672. Since the opening of the Opéra Bastille in 1989, the orchestra has also been called the Orchestre de l'Opéra Bastille.

== History ==
In 1672, the Parisian opera and its orchestra were founded by Jean-Baptiste Lully. In the 1670s, the orchestra under his direction played 1 premiere and 1 to 2 revivals per season. In the 18th century the orchestra played 2 to 8 premieres and a dozen different productions per season. In the case of reprises, the compositions were often changed because works were not protected at that time. In 1752 the first performance by a foreign company took place: les Bouffons. In 1774, for the first time, a foreign work was presented in a French translation: Gluck's Orfeo ed Euridice.

In the nineteenth century, much of the work of foreign composers was performed. The State determined the number of versions and exercised censorship. There were 1 to 7 premieres and 30 productions per season. In 1870 the company moved to the new Opera Building, now Palais Garnier. A library was set up. In the twentieth century, more attention was paid to foreign music, more and more often in the original language, and foreign companies and musicians were more often invited. The repertoire from Baroque music was rediscovered, but adapted to the modern orchestra. In 1987 the orchestra performed Händel's Giulio Cesare for the first time on authentic instruments, led by Jean-Claude Malgoire. In 1997, the orchestra played 1 to 2 premieres and 30 productions per season, under the auspices of the Paris Opera.

The orchestra played from 1870 onwards in the Palais Garnier, the old Opera, and since its opening in 1989 in the Opéra Bastille, both locations of the Paris Opera. In 2011 there were 174 musicians in the orchestra.

Many orchestral musicians taught at the Conservatoire de Paris, such as Pierre Thibaud (trumpet), Pierre Pierlot (oboe), Maurice Allard, (bassoon), Guy Deplus and Pierre Doukan.

In the 2009–2013 seasons, the young conductor and musical director of the opera Philippe Jordan performed the four parts of Wagner's Der Ring des Nibelungen for which the orchestra's line-up was expanded; on the occasion of Wagner's 200th birthday, the four parts of the so-called Festival du Ring were given again over eight days from 18 to 26 June 2013. On this occasion, Linda Watson, who played Brünnhilde's role, was appointed to the French board of the Legion of Honour on 23 June 2013.

== Musical directors ==
- Myung-Whun Chung: 1989–1994
- James Conlon: 1996–2004
- Philippe Jordan: 2009–2021
- Gustavo Dudamel: 2021–2023

== Bibliography ==
- Orchestre de l'Opéra de Paris de 1669 à nos jours, Agnès Terrier, Paris, La Martinière Groupe, 2003, 327 p., ISBN 2-7324-3059-5.
