= Faschingsschwank aus Wien =

1839 solo piano work by Robert Schumann

- by Robert Schumann
- Score
- English: Carnival Scenes/Jest from Vienna
- Opus: 26
- Composed: 1839
- Duration: c. 20 minutes
- Movements: 5
- Scoring: Solo piano

Faschingsschwank aus Wien (Carnival Scenes from Vienna or Carnival Jest from Vienna), Op. 26, is a solo piano work by Robert Schumann. He began composition of the work in 1839 in Vienna. He wrote the first four movements in Vienna, and the last on his return to Leipzig.

Eric Sams has noted that the word "Faschingsschwank" contains the letters ASCH SCHA in that order of appearance, and that Schumann used these notes in sequence as melodic material for this work. Robert Morgan has noted Schumann's use of Ludwig van Beethoven's Op. 26 as a model in this work, and also Schumann's use of musical symmetry. David Neumeyer has noted the similarity of the first section to the Valse Noble, Op. 77, No. 7 (D. 969) of Franz Schubert.

A typical performance would last roughly twenty minutes.

== Form ==
The work is in five movements:

1. Allegro: (Sehr Lebhaft), B♭ major
2. Romanze: (Ziemlich Langsam), G minor
3. Scherzino, B♭ major
4. Intermezzo: (Mit Größter Energie), E♭ minor
5. Finale: (Höchst Lebhaft), B♭ major

Marked (Sehr Lebhaft) (very lively), the first movement is the longest and one of the more virtuosic movements, notable for its innovative rhythms and its brief quote of "La Marseillaise." Of all the pieces of Faschingsschwank, this one is the least single-minded in its structure, introducing entirely new themes occasionally, only to be brought back repeatedly to two repeated motifs from the beginning. The piece comes to a crashing close with almost dissonant septuplet arpeggios.

Probably the least virtuosic of the works, the second movement takes only a page of music. Despite its shortness and apparent ease, this is undoubtedly the saddest piece in the set. Despite the fact that most of the work is in G minor, the final measure brings a resolution into G major.

Much as the title suggests, the third movement is a playful respite between two somber movements. A syncopated rhythm, with a melody based almost entirely on notes of the major chord, keeps the movement light and bouncing throughout, with the possible exception of the last run, a progression of octaves into a quick and bright cadence.

The Intermezzo is marked by its flowing sound, created by keeping a steady stream of right-hand notes in the background, interspersed with melody notes. The piece, almost entirely based on transpositions, appears difficult at first due to its speed (some musicologists have remarked that Schumann's metronome was calibrated such that it went faster than it should have, due to extreme tempi such as this one). While the background notes in the right hand do indeed move extremely fast, the melody is more singing. The background notes are mostly suited to the shape and position of the hand, despite a few leaps of the melody; in the end, the left hand takes a modified, E♭ major version of the E♭ minor melody, under the right hand. The work is a melancholy and emotionally charged display of a pianist's capability to convey feeling.

The "extremely lively" Finale begins with triumphant announcements in B♭ octaves, interspersed with brilliant moving thirds. This section is the second longest, lasting about half the length of the first movement. The patterns seen in the Finale are somewhat reminiscent of Beethoven's compositional style, using a melody that moves in both hands, while both hands also play unchanging notes beneath the melody. The energetic runs of the final bars bring the set to a dramatic close.

== Reception and performance ==
The Faschingsschwank aus Wien has been recorded many times, including performances by Arturo Benedetti Michelangeli in 1957, Annie Fischer in 1960, Sviatoslav Richter in 1962 and Radu Lupu in 1983. The Intermezzo serves as the theme music of the Lawfare podcast, performed by journalist Sophia Yan.
