= Teodora Gheorghiu =

Romanian soprano (born 1978)

Teodora Gheorghiu (born 8 May 1978 in Brașov) is a Romanian soprano who has performed in opera, concert and recital across Europe.

== Early life and training ==
Gheorghiu was born in Brașov, where she studied the flute before focussing on singing. She pursued vocal studies at the Academia de Muzică Gheorghe Dima in Cluj-Napoca and went on to participate in several competitions, including the Queen Elisabeth Music Competition and the Julián Gayarre International Singing Competition. Upon hearing Gheorghiu sing, the Spanish tenor José Carreras offered her a personal scholarship to continue with her studies.

== Career ==
Gheorghiu made her debut in 2003 at the Romanian National Opera, Bucharest, singing the role of the Queen of the Night in Mozart's Die Zauberflöte. Soon after, she was invited to appear at several European opera houses, such as La Monnaie in Brussels, the Opéra national de Lorraine in Nancy, the Théâtre des Champs-Élysées in Paris, and various Swiss theatres, including the Luzerner Theater, the Grand Théâtre de Genève and the Opéra de Lausanne.

In 2007, Gheorghiu was engaged as a member of the ensemble of the Wiener Staatsoper, and continued to sing there regularly until 2010. Her roles in Vienna included Adele in Die Fledermaus, Nanetta in Falstaff, Fiakermilli in Arabella, Adina in L'elisir d'amore, Elvira in L'italiana in Algeri, Sophie in Werther and Eudoxie in La Juive.

Gheorghiu recorded her first album, Arias for Anna de Amicis, in 2011. Her second, of Lieder was released in 2012. Gheorghiu made her UK debut at Glyndebourne in 2014, singing the role of Sophie in Der Rosenkavalier.
