= Henry Raudales =

Henry Raudales is Guatemalan-Belgian concertmaster for the Brussels Philharmonic, a position he has held since 2005. He plays a Guadagnini violin from 1787.

Raudales played his first public concert at age seven in North Carolina, which resulted in Yehudi Menuhin recommending him for a scholarship. He came in third at the Queen Elisabeth Competition in 1985.

Raudales served from 1989 to 1993 as first concertmaster of the Orchestra of the Vlaamse Opera in Antwerp and Ghent. Following this he held the same position with the Essen Philharmonic. Since September 2001 he has been concertmaster of the Munchner Rundfunk-Orchester.
