= Shoshana Rudiakov =

Latvian pianist and music teacher

Shoshana Rudiakov (1948–2012) was a Latvian pianist and music educator. She was professor of piano at the State University of Music and Performing Arts Stuttgart from 1981.

== Biographical notes ==
Shoshana Rudiakov was born on 25 June 1948 in Riga, Latvia (then within the USSR). She was the cousin of the cellist Michael Rudiakov and was married to Dimitry Rudiakov, bassoonist with the Jerusalem Symphony Orchestra. She died on 21 November 2012 in Stuttgart.

== Career ==
Rudiakov studied at the Moscow Tchaikovsky Conservatory with professors Yakov Flier and Bella Davidovich. After moving to Israel in 1973 she was engaged as soloist with major orchestras including the Israel Philharmonic. Her first appearance in Western Europe was in 1975 at the Royal Albert Hall in London with the New Philharmonia Orchestra.

She moved to Germany in 1977, and performed as soloist with the Berliner Philharmoniker, Württemberg Chamber Orchestra, and Nürnberg Philharmoniker. She appeared in many chamber music festivals alongside such leading instrumentalists as Gina Bachauer, Isaac Stern and Eugene Istomin, and gave recitals with Michael Rudiakov in the United States.

She was appointed professor of piano at the State University of Music and Performing Arts Stuttgart in 1981, and vice-rector in 2002. She gave many master classes at the State University and within the Magister Musicae project.Her student was Yumi Kiyamura.

== Discography ==
Rudiakov recorded about 15 albums, issued under the Golden Crest, Tacet, Nonesuch, Stradivari, and Nimbus labels. Among them are:

- Piano Works by Rachmaninov and Chopin. Jerusalem Records (ATD 8207), 1983
- Piano Works by Chopin, Scriabin, Rachmaninoff. Eroica Distribution, 1989
- Piano Works by Rachmaninov, Skryabin and Chopin. Danacord, 1989
- Shoshana Rudiakov: Piano Recital. Eroica Distribution, 1995
- Works for Bassoon & Piano (with Dimitry Rudiakov). Eroica Distribution, 1995
- Manchester Music Festival - Barber, Beethoven, Thuille. Eroica Classical Recordings
- Koechlin: Oeuvres Pour Hautbois, Etc. / Lajos Lencsés. Audite
- The 1993 Manchester Music Festival. Eroica Classical Recordings
- Manchester Music Festival - Rachmaninov, Dvorák: Concertos. Eroica Classical Recordings
