= Andrei Nikolsky =

Russian pianist

Andrei Vladimirovich Nikolsky (Russian: Андрей Владимирович Никольский; 1959 in Moscow - 3 February 1995 near Waterloo) was a Russian pianist.

After receiving his first piano lessons at the age of five, Nikolsky entered the Moscow Tchaikovsky Conservatory in 1976, where his teachers included Stanislav Neuhaus and Lev Naumov. He also studied with Hans Leygraf at the Mozarteum in Salzburg. Nikolsky won second prize at the Concours Long-Thibaud in 1979, as well as first prize at the Queen Elisabeth Music Competition in 1987. He died in a car accident in 1995.

Some of his recordings include the Chopin preludes, Sonata No. 2 and Rachmaninoff Sonata No. 2.
