= Hayoung Choi =

American violinist, born 1996

- Born: February 6, 1998 (age 28)
- Genres: Classical
- Occupation: Musician
- Instrument: Cello
- Years active: 2011–present
- Website: www.hayoungchoi.com

Hayoung Choi (Korean: 최하영; born February 6, 1998) is a South Korean-German concert cellist. She is the first prize winner of the Queen Elisabeth Competition in Brussels, Belgium in 2022 and first prize winner of the Krzysztof Penderecki Cello Competition in Kraków, Poland in 2018.

== Biography ==
Choi was born in Bielefield, Germany on February 6, 1998, to South Korean background. Choi started her musical education at the Korean National University of Arts in 2009 studying with Myung-Wha Chung and Hyongwon Chang. At the age of twelve, Choi debuted playing Haydn Cello Concerto No. 1 with the Camerata Salzburg. At the age of thirteen, Choi had won the Johannes Brahms International Competition in Austria becoming the youngest winner in the competition's history. In 2011, she switched into the study of Alexander Boyarsky at the Purcell School for Young Musicians in Hertfordshire, England.

In 2016, Choi earned her Bachelor of Music and in 2017 earned her Master of Music under Frans Helmerson at the Kronberg Academy in Germany. Then at the Kronberg Academy, Choi then completed into her Professional Studies with Wolfgang Emanuel Schmidt, who was also her teacher at the Berlin University of the Arts until 2022. Choi is now studying at Reina Sofía School of Music under Ivan Monighetti in Madrid, Spain.

Choi currently performs on 1707 "ex-Starker" cello made by Giuseppe filius Andrea Guarneri on loan from an anonymous patron.

On 23 June 2022, Choi performed the Haydn Cello Concerto No. 1 at the Queen Elisabeth of Belgium competition with the Orchestre Royal de Chambre de Wallonie, conducted by Vahan Mardirossian.

On 25 July, 2024, Choi performed in the Beethoven Triple Concerto together with pianist Sunwook Kim and violinist Clara-Jumi Kang and the Los Angeles Philharmonic conducted by David Robertson.

On 12 July 2025 Choi performed the Rachmaninoff Sonata for Cello and Piano with pianist Joachim Carr.

On 13 July 2025 Choi performed the Schubert Arpeggione Sonata for cello and piano with Joachim Carr pianist.

== Awards ==
- 2008: First prize winner, Antonio Janigro International Cello Competition
- 2009: First prize winner, Justus Dotzauer Competition
- 2011: First prize winner, International Johannes Brahms Competition
- 2018: First prize winner, Krzysztof Penderecki Cello Competition
- 2022: First prize winner, Queen Elisabeth Competition
