= Ilian Gârnet =

Moldovan violinist

Ilian Gârnet is a Moldovan violinist.

He was born in St. Petersburg, Russia and grew up in Moldova. His mother is a pianist, and his father is a choreographer. First studying at the Chisinau Academy with B. Dubosarsky, he later relocated to Finland to study at the Sibelius Academy under Alexander Vinnitsky. Finally he studied with Igor Oistrakh in Brussels.

He began competing at age 9, and has been a prize winner at the David Oistrakh Competition (fourth prize in 2006, third prize in 2008). He won 1st prize at the 2008 Tibor Varga Competition. At the 2009 Queen Elisabeth Music Competition, Gârnet won 3rd prize.

He has performed in Romania, Belarus, Ukraine, Russia, Poland, Bulgaria, Germany, Spain, France, Austria, Finland, Switzerland, the Netherlands, Kazakhstan, China, Japan and in the US. He has been a soloist with the National Orchestra of Belgium, the Cluj Philharmonic, the Istanbul Philharmonic, and the Zurich Philharmonics.

Since 2016 Ilian Gârnet has been First Concertmaster of the Bamberg Symphony.
