= Eliane Rodrigues =

Brazilian pianist (born 1959)

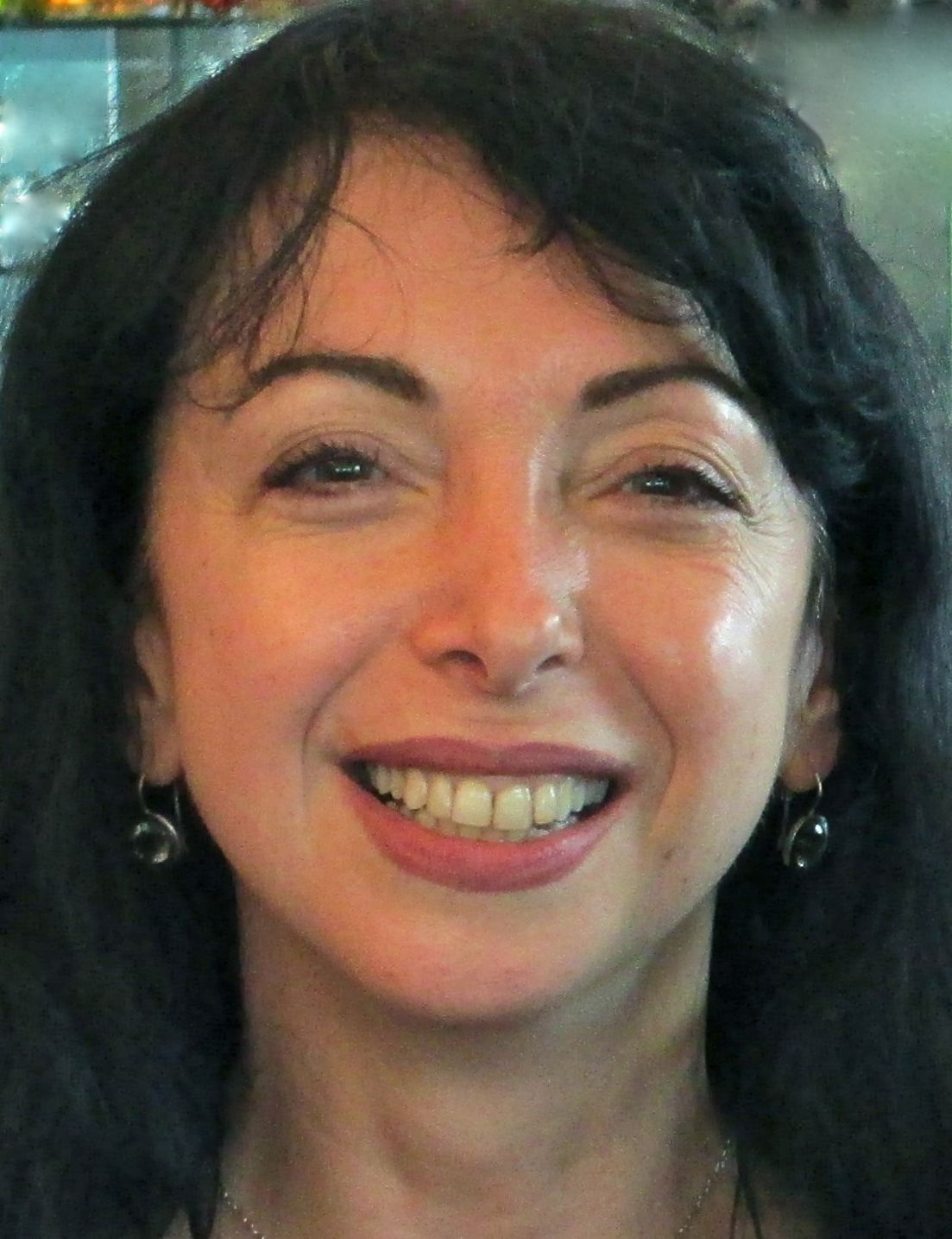
- Born: 7 October 1959 (age 66); Rio de Janeiro, Brazil

Eliane Rodrigues (born 7 October 1959) is a Brazilian pianist, songwriter, and conductor based in Belgium.

== Early life and education ==
Rodrigues was born in Rio de Janeiro on 7 October 1959. She studied with Arnaldo Estrella, Herbert Slegers, Alexander Dmitriev, Edward Serov, Dmitri Liss and Juozas Domarkas (practice). She was also guided by her mother, Gloria Rodrigues da Silva, who was a prima ballerina at the Municipal Theater of Rio de Janeiro. At the age of six, she made her first television appearance as a pianist with the National Symphony Orchestra.

== Career ==
In 1977, Rodrigues won the Special Jury Prize at the Van Cliburn International Piano Competition in the United States. In 1983, she achieved international recognition when she was awarded the Queen Elisabeth Competition in Belgium. In the following years, she performed at the Amsterdam Concertgebouw, the Leipzig Gewandhaus, in Paris and Hamburg and in other major concert halls. In 1985, she performed at Carnegie Hall in New York City and at the Mozarteum in Salzburg, Munich and Marseille.

In 2009, Rodrigues performed in Rio de Janeiro after 28 years of hiatus, at Sala Cecília Meireles, with a repertoire of Bach, Schubert, Beethoven and Chopin. She is also a composer, in particular a concerto for piano and orchestra called Rio de Janeiro, of almost an hour, which had its world premiere on 9 August 2000. Currently, Rodrigues teaches piano at the Royal Conservatoire Antwerp.

== Personal life ==
Eliane is the mother of three children.
