= Elena Gilels =

Russian pianist (1948–1996)

- Born: Elena Emilevna Gilels; September 5, 1948
- Died: June 17, 1996 (aged 47)
- Genres: Classical
- Occupation: Pianist
- Instrument: Piano

Elena Emilevna Gilels (Russian: Елена Эмильевна Ги́лельс; September 5, 1948 – June 17, 1996) was a Soviet and Russian pianist.

The daughter of pianist Emil Gilels, Elena Gilels studied at the Moscow Conservatory under Vera Gornostayeva and Yakov Flier, then with Pavel Serebryakov at the Leningrad Conservatory. Her repertoire focused on the works of Haydn, Beethoven, Mendelssohn, Chopin, Liszt, Schumann, Mussorgsky, Tchaikovsky, Rachmaninoff and Prokofiev. Elena Gilels is perhaps best remembered for her performances of Mozart's piano concertos. She frequently performed with her father Emil Gilels, with whom she recorded Mozart's Concerto for Two Pianos, KV. 365.

== Literature ==
- Grigoryev L. Platek J. "Modern pianists." Moscow, "Soviet composer", 1990
