= Tristan-Patrice Challulau =

French composer

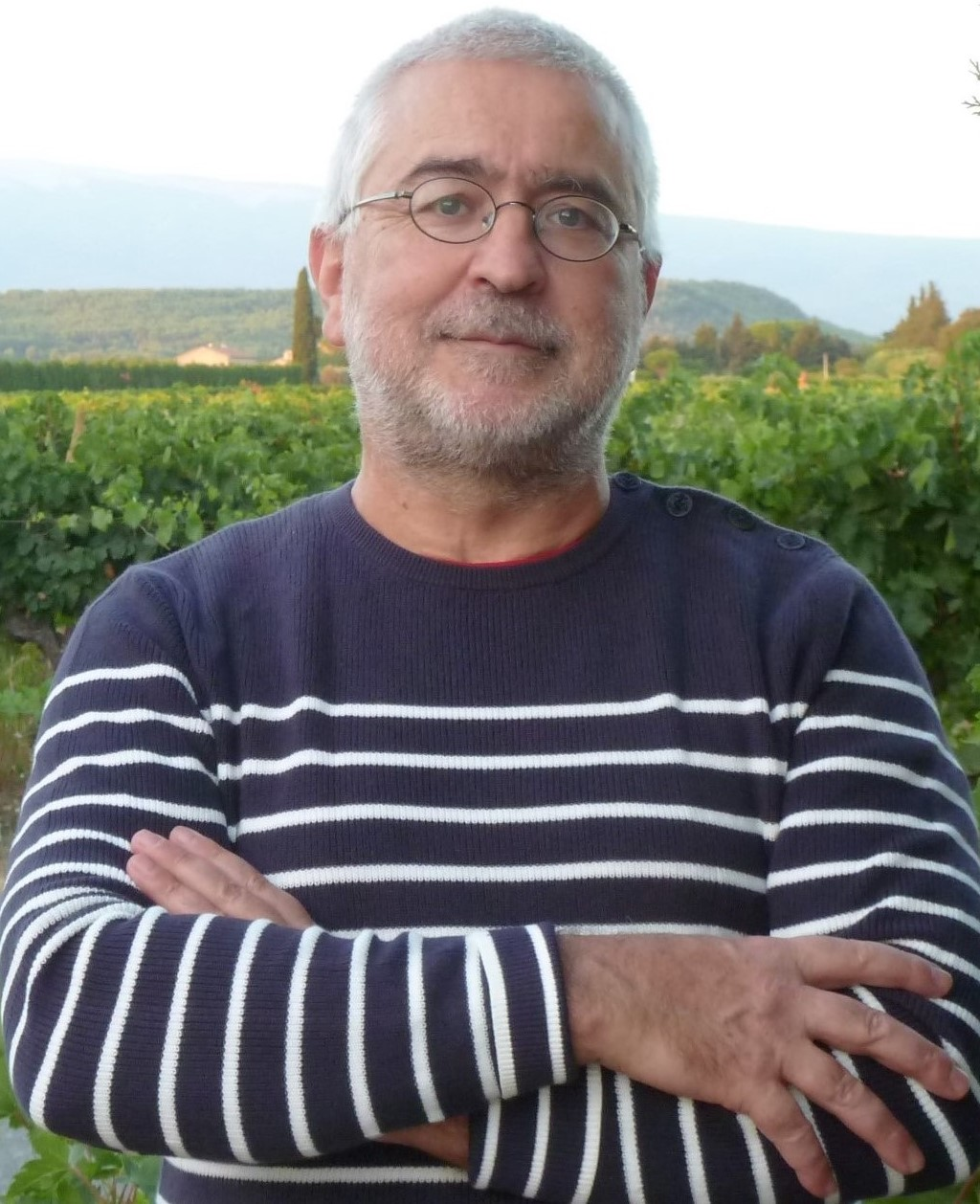

Background information
- Born: November 13, 1959 (age 65); Aix-en-Provence, France
- Occupation(s): composer, pianist
- Instrument: piano
- Website: www.challulau.net

Tristan-Patrice Challulau (born 13 November 1959 in Aix-en-Provence) is a French composer.

In 1991, he won the first composition prize at the Queen Elisabeth Competition.

In 1996 he was a resident of the Laurent Vibert Foundation at the Château de Lourmarin.

In 1996/1997 he was a member of the Casa Velázquez in Madrid. Among other things, he wrote his REQUIEM in memoriam Baudoin 1er (recorded on CD)

In 1977/2018 he was an independent composer (member of the Polymus group, the MIM -Laboratoire Musique Informatique de Marseille- and the Decadanse Ensemble). He was also a guest at the Round Top Festival Institute (Texas) where he wrote Round Top eagles - a piece for piano M.G. alone, set as a piano/orchestra concerto about ten years later.
