= Henry Kramer =

American pianist

== Background ==
Henry Kramer graduated from the Juilliard School where he worked with Julian Martin and Robert McDonald. He received his Doctorate of Musical Arts from the Yale School of Music under the guidance of Boris Berman. Kramer is a Steinway Artist.

== Awards ==
Henry won top prizes at the National Chopin Competition in 2010, the Montreal International Competition in 2011 and the China Shanghai International Piano Competition in 2012. In 2014 he was added to the roster of Astral Artists, an organization that annually selects a handful of rising stars among strings, piano, woodwinds, and voice candidates. The following year, he earned a top prize in the 2015 Honens International Piano Competition.

In 2016, he garnered international recognition with a second prize win in the Queen Elisabeth Competition in Brussels. Most recently, he was awarded the 2019 Avery Fisher Career Grant by Lincoln Center, an honor bestowed to young American soloists.

== Performances and solo recitals ==
Henry has performed several solo recital debuts, most notably at Alice Tully Hall as the recipient of the Juilliard School’s William Petschek Award in 2015. In 2012 he had his European debut at the Concertgebouw in Amsterdam.

Henry has soloed in concertos with the Bilkent Symphony Orchestra, Shanghai Philharmonic Orchestra, Indianapolis Symphony and the Calgary Philharmonic Orchestra, among many others, collaborating with conductors such as Marin Alsop, Gerard Schwarz, Stéphane Denève, Yan Pascal Tortelier and Hans Graf. Upcoming performances in the 2019-20 season include a return engagement with the National Orchestra of Belgium performing Beethoven’s Concerto No. 4, as well as debuts with the Columbus, Hartford Symphony Orchestras playing Rachmaninoff’s Piano Concerto No. 3 and the Chamber Orchestra of Philadelphia.

As a concert collaborator he has appeared in recitals at the Chamber Music Society of Lincoln Center, the Mainly Mozart Festival, the Mostly Mozart Festival, and La Jolla Music Society’s Summerfest. Henry has also performed alongside Emmanuel Pahud, the Calidore String Quartet, the Pacifica Quartet, Miriam Fried, as well as members of the Berlin Philharmonic and Orchestra of St. Luke’s.

== Teaching ==
Kramer joined the music faculty of Université de Montréal in the fall of 2022. Henry previously held the L. Rexford Distinguished Chair in Piano at the Schwob School of Music at Columbus State University in Columbus, Georgia from 2018 until his departure in 2022. He has also held positions at Smith College and the University of Missouri Kansas City Conservatory of Dance and Music.

== Recordings ==
Henry’s discography includes recordings on Naxos, Queen Elisabeth Competition, Champs Hill Records, and Cedille.

== Discography ==
- Liszt Complete Piano Music 47 (2017 Naxos)
- Queen Elisabeth Competition: Piano 2016 (Live) (2016 Queen Elisabeth Competition)
- Mythes (2018 Champs Hill Records)
- Ascent (2019 Cedille)
