= Michel Petrossian =

French-Armenian composer

Michel Petrossian (born 1973) is a French-Armenian composer of classical music.

== Career ==
Born in Yerevan, Armenia, Petrossian studied cello and guitar and then studied composition at the Conservatoire National Supérieur de Musique et de Danse in Paris, from which he graduated in 2001. He has given duo performances on guitar with the Egyptian percussionist Gad Hesham and in 1998, with Jérôme Combier, co-founded Cairn, a contemporary music ensemble of fellow students from the conservatoire. As of May 2013, he was working on an opera with the American librettist Leslie Dunton-Downer.

He also has an interest in philology and ancient languages, and studied Ancient Hebrew, Ugaritic, Aramaic, Akkadian, Ancient Greek and Old Armenian at the École des langues et des civilisations de l'Orient ancien (part of the Catholic University of Paris) and at the Sorbonne, where he earned a master's degree.

Petrossian won the 2012 Queen Elisabeth Prize for Composition. His concerto for piano and orchestra In the Wake of Ea, inspired by his interest in ancient languages, will be performed at the Centre for Fine Arts, Brussels, by the twelve finalists in the piano competition and the National Orchestra of Belgium conducted by Marin Alsop from 27 May (the world première) to 1 June 2013.

== Selected works ==
=== Solo ===
- Overcoming Trakart, for cello
- La lutte ardente du vert et de l'or, for piano
- Manuela with the broken finger, for clarinet

=== Ensemble ===
- Feu pale, for 6 instruments
- Autel des parfums, for 9 instruments

=== Voice ===
- Le miroir et le masque, three melodies for voice and instrumental ensemble

"Huitan"
"Rose sombre"
"Lysanxia"

- En Ein Anéin, for soprano and recorder

=== Orchestra ===
- Iris lunaire, for choir and orchestra
- Château du double de Ptah
- Epiphaneia, for six singers and orchestra
- Sur la surface de l'abîme, for string orchestra
- In the wake of Ea, for piano and orchestra
