= Gábor Gabos =

Hungarian musician

Gábor Gabos (4 January 1930 – 27 August 2014) was a Hungarian pianist.

Born in Budapest, in 1960 he was awarded a 5th prize at the Queen Elisabeth competition, and one year later he won the Liszt-Bartók competition; an intercontinental concert career ensued. In 1976 he was decorated a Merited Artist of the Hungarian People's Republic.
