= André Dumortier =

20th century Belgian pianist

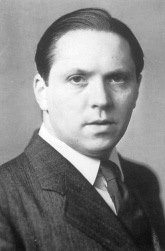
André Dumortier

André Dumortier (1 October 1910, in Comines, Belgium – 3 September 2004, in Tournai) was a Belgian pianist.

He participated in the Concours Eugène Ysaÿe (future Queen Elisabeth Music Competition) in 1938, and it has been said that he is firmly entrenched in the public memory of Tournai. After the Second World War, he became a professor at the Conservatoire Royal de Bruxelles in Belgium, and later the director of the Conservatoire de Tournai. At the same time, he pursued a career as a soloist and chamber musician of international renown.

Belgian composer Jean Absil's "Grande Suite, Op. 62" is dedicated to Dumortier.

Dumortier was active even in his retirement, launching master classes in Tournai in 1988, during the course of which young pianists from various countries came together each year. He also completed several recordings. Perhaps his greatest legacy remains that of a teaching placed under the signs of "my beauty" and "the essential."
