= V Queen Elisabeth Music Competition =

5th edition of the Queen Elisabeth Music Competition

The fifth edition of the Queen Elisabeth Music Competition took place in 1953. It was the inaugural edition of its composition competition.

== Palmares ==
	Winner	Composition
1st Prize	(Poland) Michał Spisak	Serenade for Orchestra
2nd Prize	(France) Jean-Michel Defaye	Symphonic Dances
3rd Prize	(Italy) Carlo Franci	Concerto for Orchestra
4th Prize	(United States) Alvin Etler	Symphony
5th Prize	(Netherlands) Matthijs Vermeulen	Symphony No. 2 Prélude a la Nouvelle Journée
6th Prize	(France) Michel Ciry	Le Mystère de Jésus
7th Prize	(Japan) Makoto Moroi	Composition No. 1
8th Prize	(Greece) Yiannis Papaioannou	Symphony No. 3
9th Prize	(United States) James Cohn	Symphony No. 2
10th Prize	(Switzerland) Luctor Ponse	Symphony No. 1

== Jury ==
  - (Belgium) Jean Absil
  - (France) Nadia Boulanger
  - (Belgium) Marcel Cuvelier (chairman)
  - (Netherlands) Sem Dresden
  - (Brazil) Camargo Guarnieri
  - (Belgium) Léon Jongen
  - (Italy) Gian Francesco Malipiero
  - (Switzerland) Frank Martin
  - (Switzerland) Aloys Mooser
  - (Poland) Andrzej Panufnik
  - (Belgium) Marcel Poot
  - (Chile) Domingo Santa Cruz
