= Arne van Erpekum Sem =

Arne Ole van Erpekum Sem (May 19, 1873 – 1951) was a Norwegian singer, vocal teacher and music critic. He made his debut as Max in Der Freischütz, by Carl Maria von Weber.

== Biography ==
=== Early years ===
Erpekum Sem was born in Oslo, but grew up in county Vest-Agder, southern Norway.
