= Dmitry Sitkovetsky =

Soviet and American violinist (born 1954)

Dmitry Yulianovich Sitkovetsky (Russian: Дмитрий Юлианович Ситковецкий; born September 27, 1954) is a Soviet and American violinist, conductor, and arranger.

== Early life ==
Dmitry Sitkovetsky was born in Baku, Azerbaijan, to violinist Julian Sitkovetsky and pianist Bella Davidovich. His mother, the winner of the 1949 Chopin Competition, came from a family of three generations of musicians; his father won several International competitions and had already established himself as a violinist and artist of exceptional quality by his death at age 32, when Sitkovetsky was three years old. After his father's death, the family moved to Moscow, where Sitkovetsky entered the Moscow Conservatory. In 1977, aged 22, he decided to leave the Soviet Union. Sitkovetsky arrived in New York City on September 11, 1977, and immediately began studying at the Juilliard School.

== Career ==
Sitkovetsky has a successful career as a violinist, conductor, arranger, chamber musician and festival director.

Over the four decades since the launch of his career in Vienna's Musikverein in 1979, Sitkovetsky has worked with many of the world's great conductors and orchestras, including Sir Neville Marriner, Mariss Jansons, Sir Colin Davis, Yuri Temirkanov; the Berlin Philharmonic, Royal Concertgebouw Orchestra, London Symphony, Philharmonia, Chicago Symphony, Cleveland Orchestra, New York Philharmonic, Los Angeles Philharmonic, Philadelphia Orchestra, Leipzig Gewandhaus, Bayerischer RF, Munich Philarmonicc, Sofia Philharmonic and the NHK Symphony. He has made more than 40 recordings as a violinist, with repertoire from Bach to Rodion Shchedrin.

Sitkovetsky also is a conductor, and has worked with orchestras such as Academy of St-Martin-In-The-Fields, London Philharmonic, Orchestre de Chambre de Paris, Orchestra della Toscana, San Francisco Symphony, Dallas Symphony, Shanghai Symphony, and Tokyo Metropolitan Orchestra. In 1990, he founded the New European Strings Chamber Orchestra (NES), bringing together distinguished string players from the top European ensembles of both Russian and Western musical backgrounds (reflecting his own life story). Since 2003, Sitkovetsky has served as the Music Director of the Greensboro Symphony Orchestra, North Carolina, to which he has brought such soloists as Emmanuel Ax, Yefim Bronfman, Lynn Harrell, and Pinchas Zukerman. Previous positions of artistic leadership have included the Orquesta Sinfónica de Castilla y Leon (Artist in Residence, 2006-2009), Russian State Symphony Orchestra ‘Evgeny Svetlanov’ (Principal Guest Conductor, 2002-2005), and the Ulster Orchestra (Principal Conductor & Artistic Advisor, 1996-2001).

As violinist and guest conductor, Sitkovetsky's 2019/2020 season was busy and varied until the COVID-19 pandemic. As live performance came to an end in 2020, Sitkovetsky turned to creating an online presence with the New European Strings. He brought together remotely a distinguished ensemble of musicians, playing the transcriptions he calls his "Opus Coronavirus". He took Leonid Desyatnikov's piano cycle The Bukovina Preludes, transcribed them, and recorded them distantly with his NES Virtual Ensemble. These as well as the new Bach Dance Suite transcriptions had a virtual audience of 250,000 on social media.

Sitkovetsky's debut TEDx Talk, "The Power of Curiosity", focused on the importance and unexpected joy of thinking outside the box, as well as the need always to reinvent yourself. His 10-part interview series on Medici.tv ("It Ain’t Necessarily So"), featuring such stars as Evgeny Kissin, Mischa Maisky, Leonidas Kavakos and Yefim Bronfman, was reaired and inspired a new series, "Sitkovetsky & Friends", in which Sitkovetsky interviews the soloists for the upcoming season of the Greensboro Symphony. He recently launched a new programme, "Transformation: the Art of reinvention at the time of the Pandemic”, live on his YouTube channel every Sunday and features conversations with his friends and colleagues such as Sir Antonio Pappano, Viktoria Mullova, Barry Douglas, and Roger Vignoles.

Sitkovetsky has developed and led a number of festivals, including the Korsholm Music Festival, Finland (1983-1993, and 2002), the Seattle International Music Festival (1992-1997), the Silk Route of Music, Azerbaijan (1999), and the Festival del Sole, Tuscany (2003-2006). In 2018/2019, he was invited as Artist-in-Residence of Vadim Repin's Trans-Siberian Festival. He is a close partner and a regular guest at other distinguished festivals, including the Verbier Festival, Festival Ljubljana, and the George Enescu Festival.

Sitkovetsky has contributed greatly to the art of transcription. His orchestral and string trio versions of Bach's Goldberg Variations continue to be heard regularly in performances and recordings by many performers. Following their success, Sitkovetsky has gone on to arrange over 50 works of major repertoire by composers such as Bartók, Beethoven, Brahms, Haydn, Schnittke, and Shostakovich. In 2015, he unveiled his transcription of Stravinsky's Le baiser de la fée, commissioned by the Orpheus Chamber Orchestra, and premiered by Augustin Hadelich at Carnegie Hall; in the 2017/2018 season, a new multi-genre/multimedia work, Devil, Soldier & Violin (inspired by Stravinsky's L'histoire du soldat) premiered in Moscow's Tchaikovsky Concert Hall with sold-out performances across Russia. In the summer 2018, the Verbier Festival commissioned and gave the world premiere of Sitkovetsky's transcription of Sarasate's Navarra Fantasy. This performance, which marked the festival's 25th anniversary, was broadcast live worldwide on Medici.tv, with an all-star lineup of musicians including Lisa Batiashvili, Leonidas Kavakos, Mischa Maisky, Vadim Repin, Maxim Vengerov, Tabea Zimmermann, and Pinchas Zukerman.

== Personal life ==
Since 1987 Sitkovetsky has resided in London with his wife, Susan, and their daughter, Julia, a professional opera singer.
