= Berl Senofsky =

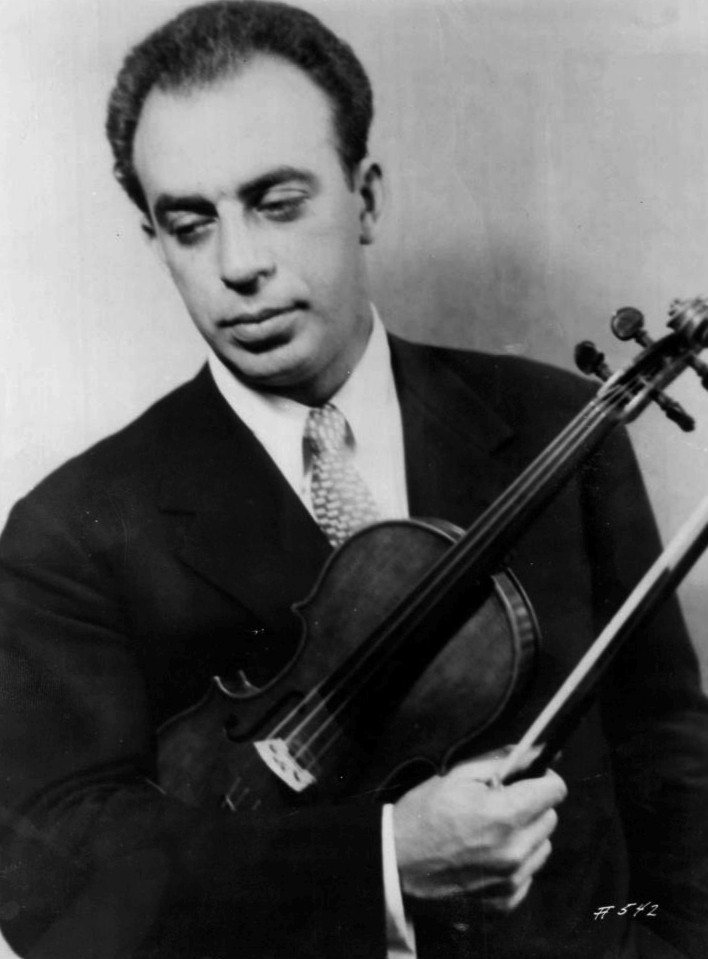
- Senofsky in 1956
- Born: April 19, 1926; Philadelphia, Pennsylvania, U.S.
- Died: June 21, 2002 (aged 76); Baltimore, Maryland, U.S.
- Education: Juilliard
- Occupation(s): Violinist, teacher
- Years active: 1946−1996
- Organization: Peabody Conservatory
- Spouse(s): Shirley Trepel (div.); Ellen Mack (div.); Kyung Moon Ahn (dec. 2000)
- Children: 2

Berl Senofsky (April 19, 1926 − June 21, 2002) was an American classical violinist and teacher, active during the twentieth century.

== Biography ==
Senofsky was born in Philadelphia in 1926. His parents were violinists and had moved to the United States from the Soviet Union. He started on violin at age three and was taught by his father. His talent was noted early on. At age six he won a scholarship to study with Louis Persinger. At age twelve he won a scholarship to study at Juilliard with Ivan Galamian, which turned into a twelve-year association.

Senofsky served in the milliary during World War II. Following the war he debuted in New York City and won the William Naumburg Competition in 1946. Soon after, he started to perform with the Cleveland Orchestra under George Szell. He was the assistant concertmaster of the Cleveland Orchestra from 1951 to 1955. In 1955 he became the first American to win the Queen Elisabeth Competition, an international competition in Belgium. Subsequently, he became a jury member of the competition and toured extensively and internationally, including in Australia, Africa, Europe, South America, United States, Soviet Union and East Asia. In the United States he performed with the New York Philharmonic, American Symphony Orchestra, Chicago Symphony, Los Angeles Philharmonic, Pittsburgh Symphony and others.

Senofsky was a faculty member at the Peabody Conservatory in Baltimore and taught from 1965 to 1996. During this period, he gave a performance at the Library of Congress which was recorded and subsequently released. He founded the American Artists International Foundation which prepared young violinists for competition. In 1983 he was invited to China by the Shanghai Conservatory to teach, perform, and start a music program.

In a 1979 interview, Senofsky said: "to me music is a higher calling than just a profession". In 1999 he was featured in a documentary about renowned musicians whose later careers were spent away from the spotlight. He was a well-respected teacher and was called an American musical hero by Newsweek. His students perform in major symphony orchestras. He played a 1771 Balestrieri violin and a 1757 Landolfi violin. As a young man Senofsky was athletic and played football. In later years he enjoyed gatherings with friends and had a sense of humor.

Senofsky died of complications from heart and lung disease on June 21, 2002, at age 76 in his home in Baltimore, Maryland.

== Personal ==
Senofsky was married three times. His first wife, cellist Shirley Trepel, and his second wife, pianist Ellen Mack, were fellow musicians whom he performed and recorded with during his career. His third wife, Kyung Moon Ahn, died in 2000. He was survived by a son and a daughter.
