= Frans Brouw =

Belgian-Canadian pianist (1929–2025)

Florent Robert Frans Brouw
- Born: 31 January 1929; Veurne, Belgium
- Died: 8 July 2025 (aged 96)
- Occupation: pianist

Florent Robert Frans Brouw (31 January 1929 – 8 July 2025) was a Belgian pianist. He became a Canadian citizen in 1975.

== Life and career ==
Brouw finished his studies in Brussels' Royal Conservatory in 1952, taking part immediately after in the resumed Queen Elisabeth Music Competition, where he was awarded the 4th prize. An intense concert career ensued throughout the 1950s. Brouw taught in the Ghent Conservatory for a few years before settling in Quebec City in 1964. He was an Honoured Citizen of Veurne.

Brouw is the dedicatee of Jean Absil's Trois Pieces de Piano (pour la main droite seule) Op. 32.

Brouw died on 8 July 2025, at the age of 96.
