= Mikhaïl Faerman =

Mikhail Faerman (born 29 April 1955 in Bălți, Moldavian SSR, Soviet Union) is a Soviet and Belgian classical pianist.

== Career ==
Faerman started to study the piano at the age of three. In 1962, he was sent to sit for entrance examinations at the Central Music School of Moscow. Faerman was admitted to the class of Evgenia Yarmonenko. He entered the Moscow State Conservatory of Music at the age of 17 and studied there from 1972 to 1977 with distinguished Professor Jacob Flier.

In 1975, Faerman won the First Prize at the Queen Elisabeth Music Competition in Brussels.

In October 1978, as a Refusenik, Faerman tried to defected the Soviet Union. After winning the Queen Elisabeth Competition, he asked Belgium the permission to stay "for artistic freedom".

In 1979, Faerman became a professor at the Royal Conservatory of Mons in Belgium.

Since 1979, Faerman was regularly a member of the Jury at the Conservatories of Brussels, Liège, Luxembourg, Paris etc.

In March 1985, Faerman participated in the Jury of the International Competition in Épinal, France.

In September 1985, Faerman was invited to play the piano at the International Festival of Seoul in South Korea, where he gave a concert.

In November 1987, Faerman served as president of the Jury of the First European Piano Competition.

Since 1997, Faerman has been a professor of piano at the Royal Conservatory of Music in Brussels.
