= Miguel Gálvez-Taroncher =

Miguel Gálvez-Taroncher (born 1974 in Valencia) is a Spanish cultural manager and musician, trained in Madrid and Vienna.

Gálvez-Taroncher is director of the Chopin International Piano Competition in Granada. He was awarded the X Queen Elisabeth competition for his composition La luna y la muerte, which therefore was a mandatory work at the piano competition's finals.

== Selective list of works ==
- Alea, for clarinet, 1995.
- Nodos, for marimba, 1996.
- Gestus, for piano, 1996.
- El Velo, for piano, 1997.
- Poemas de la ladera este, for barytone and piano, 1998.
- Cercles, for piano, 1999.
- Ficciones, for violin and percussion, 2000.
- Strahlung, for bass clarinet and ensemble, 2000.
- Telar, for symphony orchestra, 2001.
- Konzert für Bassklarinet und Ensemble, 2002.
- El sueño eterno, for string quartet, 2003.
- Eclipse, for flute, violin and viola, 2003.
- Mondszene, for piano with electronics, 2004.
- El gran inquisidor, for tenor, barytone and percussion, 2004.
- Noche de sollozos, for mezzo-soprano and symphony orchestra, 2005.
- La Luna y la Muerte, for piano and orchestra, 2006.
- Des Près-Variations, for six instruments.
- Blick in die Wirrnis, for string quartet, 2007
- Kammerkonzert, 2007.
- Paisaje sonoro (homenaje a Jaime Sabines), for eight instruments, 2008.
- Llama de amor viva, Konzert für Violine, 2008.
- Konzert für Orchester, for symphony orchestra, 2008.
- "In Memoriam", for symphony orchestra, 2010.
- "Del Dolor Doblegado", for ensemble, 2010.
- "Interludios de la Canción Triste de la Mujer Maya", for clarinet and percussion, 2011.
- "U Payalchí'ob J'meno'ob", for two singers, baroque flute, percussions and electronics, 2012.
- "Concierto de Cámara nº 2" In Memoriam Carlos García Hirschfeld, for violin, cello, timpani and string orchestra, 2012.
- "En Busca del Tao en las Montañas de Otoño", for ensemble, 2012.
- "Preludio a Hendecameron", for mandoline, guitar and harp, 2012.
- "...que velo tus sueños y tu vigilia...", for vocal quartet and string quartet, 2013
