= Ekaterina Novitskaya =

Russian pianist (born 1951)

- Born: 24 October 1951 (age 75); Moscow, USSR
- Citizenship: Russia; Belgium
- Occupation: Pianist
- Spouse: François-Emmanuel Hervy
- Children: 5

Ekaterina Novitskaya-Hervy, née Ekaterina Novitskaya (or Yekaterina Novitskaya, Russian: Екатерина Георгиевна Новицкая; born 24 October 1951), is a Russian pianist, now living in Belgium.

Her international recognition came at the age of 16, when she won the 1968 Queen Elisabeth Competition in Brussels.

== Biography ==
Born in Moscow, Russia, Novitskaya started playing piano at the age of 4. Having demonstrated promise, at 6 she enrolled in the Moscow State Tchaikovsky Conservatory's Central Music School for gifted children, where she studied for eight years in Evgeny Timakin's piano class. Then she continued under the tutelage of Lev Oborin.

In 1968, at the age of 16, she won the Belgian Queen Elisabeth Competition, becoming its first female winner in the piano department. Actually, only those who had turned 17 were eligible to compete, but the organizers made an exception for her.

After graduating from the Moscow Conservatory with honors, Novitskaya continued her studies in its graduate school. After completing the graduate school, she started serving at the conservatory teaching piano.

In 1971, Novitskaya made an American recording debut with an album of Prokofiev, a re-edition of her 1969 Melodiya album. Billboard wrote in its review: "This LP shows why [Novitskaya won the top prize in 1968 Queen Elizabeth contest]. She's only 17 but has the skill, technique and determination, as evidenced here, to make it all the way." The New York Times applauded her "burnished precision", "flair" and "imagination". There were also positive reviews in magazines like High Fidelity and Stereo Review. Stereo Review marked Novitskaya's performance as "stunning". "Against the stiff recorded competition of Richter, Rubinstein, and Sandor, Novitskaya manages to do better than just hold her own in her performance of Visions," wrote one of the reviewers.

In 1978, Novitskaya emigrated from the Soviet Union to marry Belgian François-Emmanuel Hervy, whom she first met back in 1968 during the Queen Elisabeth Competition that she won. For many years, they had exchanged letters, rarely being able to meet in person. Soviet authorities had "hinted" to Novitskaya that if she stays in the West, there would be no going back to the USSR for her, but she still chose to "defect".

In 1985, Novitskaya made her New York concert debut. The New York Times published a cautious review, stating that Novitskaya "didn't make a strong impression" and that "(knowing of her earlier successes) one began speculating on reasons". The reviewer stated that "she showed good basic technical proficiency", but employed "some cautious tempos" and "it was hard to account for the static quality of her phrasing."

Back in the Soviet Union, where she had been very popular, her "defection" was kept secret. When she emigrated, her name quietly disappeared from the media and from concert posters. She would not perform in Russia until 1996, when Mstislav Rostropovich organized her Russian comeback tour. Her concerts in the Great Hall of the Moscow Conservatory, St. Petersburg and Nizhny Novgorod were a success. The Russian magazine Ogoniok wrote: "She is covered with flowers. People shout to her: ′Katya!' They wait for her at the service entrance in the hope of getting an autograph."

Novitskaya is now a Belgian citizen and lives in Mons. She and François-Emmanuel Hervy have 5 children.
