= Queen Elisabeth Competition =

Belgian musical competition

Official logo, English version.

The Queen Elisabeth Competition (Dutch: Koningin Elisabethwedstrijd, French: Concours musical international Reine Élisabeth) is an international competition for career-starting musicians held in Brussels. The competition is named after Queen Elisabeth of Belgium (1876–1965). It is a competition for classical violinists (since 1937), pianists (since 1938), singers (since 1988) and cellists (since 2017). It also used to hold international competitions for composers from 1953 to 2012. The patron is Queen Mathilde of Belgium.

Since its foundation it has been considered one of the most challenging and prestigious competitions for instrumentalists. In 1957 the Queen Elisabeth Competition was one of the founding members of the World Federation of International Music Competitions.

== History ==
Eugène Ysaÿe, Belgian concert violinist, wanted to set up an international music competition for young virtuosi showcasing their all-round skill, but died before he could do so. Queen Elisabeth, patroness of the arts and good friend of Ysaÿe, set up the competition in his memory in 1937. The prestige of Ysaÿe and Belgium's Royal Court (King Albert and Queen Elisabeth were admired heroes of the First World War) assured that the first competition would draw great entrants.

=== 1937–1950 ===
The first two editions of the competition, in 1937 for violin and in 1938 for piano, were named after Ysaÿe. World War II and other impediments prevented the competition from taking place from 1940 to 1950.

	1937	1938
Violin	X	
Piano		X

=== 1951–1986 ===
In 1951, the competition was renamed for its patroness, Queen Elisabeth, and has taken place under that name since then. It is one of three musical institutions (the others being the Queen Elisabeth Music Chapel and Antwerp Symphony Orchestra, residence orchestra of the Queen Elisabeth Hall) dedicated to the former Queen.

Entrants are expected to learn a compulsory work written especially for the competition. (The work is picked during the composition competition.) Usually there is also a section where contestants are expected to perform a work by a Belgian composer. From 1963 to 1980, Marcel Poot of the Brussels Conservatory chaired the jury of the competition and wrote several commissioned works to mark the occasion, that were used as competition-required pieces.

The competition restarted with four-year cycles, starting with two consecutive years for violin and piano respectively, followed by a year for international composition competitions. The fourth year of each cycle had no competition. The years 1973 to 1974 were a transition to cycles with instrument competitions in even years, and the internationional composition competition in the year between the violin and the piano competitions, until the early 1980s when the cycles were re-arranged again.

Year	Violin	Piano	Composition
1951	X		For Belgian composers
1952		X	For Belgian composers
1953			International
1955	X		For Belgian composers
1956		X	For Belgian composers
1957			International
1959	X		For Belgian composers
1960		X	For Belgian composers
1961			International
1963	X		For Belgian composers
1964		X	For Belgian composers
1965			International
1967	X		For Belgian composers
1968		X	For Belgian composers
1969			International
1971	X		For Belgian composers
1972		X	For Belgian composers
1975		X	For Belgian composers
1976	X		For Belgian composers
1977			International
1978		X	For Belgian composers
1980	X		For Belgian composers
1982			International
1983		X	For Belgian composers
1985	X		For Belgian composers

=== 1987–2006 ===
With the competition for voice (singing) introduced in 1988 the four-year cycles were piano → voice → violin → year without performer competition. Before 2002 there were no composition competitions in even years.

	1987	1988	1989	1990	1991	1992	1993	1994	1995	1996
Piano	X				X				X	
Voice/singing		X				X				X
Violin			X				X			
Composition					X		X		X	
Composition for Belgian composers	X		X		X		X		X	

	1997	1998	1999	2000	2001	2002	2003	2004	2005	2006
Piano			X				X			
Voice/singing				X				X		
Violin	X				X				X	
Composition	X		X		X	X		X		X
Composition for Belgian composers	X		X		X		X		X	

=== 2007–2014 ===
From 2007 there were no longer years without competition for performers: with three disciplines (piano, voice, violin), each of these returned in a three-year cycle.

There were competitions for composition in 2008, 2009, 2011 and 2012, each of these for the performance piece of the instrumentalist finale of the next year.

	2007	2008	2009	2010	2011	2012	2013	2014
Piano	X			X			X	
Voice		X			X			X
Violin			X			X		
Composition		X	X		X	X		

=== 2015 and beyond ===
From 2015 there are again four-year cycles, with, for the first time in 2017, a cello competition added after the year with the piano competition. The public composition competitions stopped. The 2020 competition was postponed to 2021 due to the COVID-19 pandemic.

	2015	2016	2017	2018	2019	2020	2021	2022	2023	2024	2025	2026
Violin	X				X					X		
Piano		X					X				X	
Cello			X					X				X
Voice				X					X			

== Patronage and prizes ==
The Queen Elisabeth Competition generates income from its own activities, from private patronage and from sponsoring. Resources are varied: part of the funding for the prizes laureates receive is provided by public authorities and patrons, corporate sponsors, donors contributions, ticket and programme sales, advertising in the programmes and the sale of recordings. The Competition also benefits from the volunteer assistance of families who open their homes to candidates for the duration of the competition.

Prizes for the laureates of the competition (amounts as awarded in the 2015 violin competition):

- First prize, International Queen Elisabeth Grand Prize – Prize of the patron Queen (as of 2015: Queen Mathilde Prize): 25,000 euro, numerous concerts, recording on CD; for the violin competition also: loan of the 'Huggins' Stradivarius violin from the Nippon Music Foundation until the next violin competition.
- Second Prize, Belgian Federal Government Prize: 20,000 euro, concerts, recording on CD
- Third Prize, Count de Launoit Prize: 17,000 euro, concerts
- Fourth Prize, Prize awarded alternately by each of the communities of Belgium (2015: awarded by the Government of the Federation Wallonia-Brussels): 12,500 euro, concerts
- Fifth Prize, Brussels Capital Region Prize: 10,000 euro, concerts
- Sixth Prize, City of Brussels Prize: 8,000 euro, concerts
- For the other six laureates, sums donated by the Belgian National Lottery: 4,000 euro each

== Laureates ==
Competitions for performing musicians have 12 finalists performing as a soloist before a full symphonic orchestra. Originally and until 1993, all finalists became ranked laureates, later only the first six laureates were ranked. The first editions of the competition were dominated by candidates from the USSR: the 1937 violin competition was won by David Oistrakh and the next year Emil Gilels won the piano competition. The piano competition of 1952 and the violin competition of 1955 were the first to see winners from the United States. By the time of the 50th competition in 2012, an increasing number of Asian contestants reached the finals.

Source.

=== Violin ===
Year	1st	2nd	3rd	4th	5th	6th
1937	David Oistrakh (Tchaikovsky)	Ricardo Odnoposoff	Elizabeth Gilels	Boris Goldstein	Marina Kozolupova	Mikhail Fichtengolz
1951	Leonid Kogan (Paganini 1)	Mikhail Vayman	Elise Cserfalvi	Theo Olof	Alexei Gorokhov	Hedi Gigler
1955	Berl Senofsky (Brahms)	Julian Sitkovetsky	Pierre Doukan	Francine Dorfeuille-Boussinot	Victor Pikayzen	Alberto Lysy
1959	Jaime Laredo (Sibelius)	Albert Markov	Joseph Silverstein	Vladimir Malinin	Boris Kouniev	Georgui Mintchev Badev
1963	Aleksey Mikhlin (Shostakovich 1)	Semyon Snitkovsky	Arnold Steinhardt	Zarius Shikhmurzayeva	Charles Castleman	Masuko Ushioda
1967	Philippe Hirschhorn (Paganini 1)	Stoïka Milanova	Gidon Kremer	Roman Nodel	Hidetaro Suzuki	Jean-Jacques Kantorow
1971	Miriam Fried (Sibelius)	Andrey Korsakov	Hamao Fujiwara	Ana Chumachenco	Edith Volckaert	Joshua Epstein
1976	Mikhaïl Bezverkhny (Saint-Saëns 3)	Irina Medvedeva	Dong-Suk Kang	Grigori Zhislin	Shizuka Ishikawa	
1980	Yuzuko Horigome (Sibelius)	Peter Zazofsky	Takashi Shimizu	Ruriko Tsukahara	Mihaela Martin	
1985	Hu Nai-yuan (Elgar)	Ik-hwan Bae	Henry Raudales	Hu Kun	Mi Kyung Lee	
1989	Vadim Repin (Tchaikovsky)	Akiko Suwanai	Evgeny Bushkov	Erez Ofer	Ulrike-Anima Mathé	
1993	Yayoi Toda (Sibelius)	Liviu Prunaru	Keng-Yuen Tseng	Martin Beaver	Natalia Prischepenko	
1997	Nikolaj Znaider (Sibelius)	Albrecht Breuninger	Kristóf Baráti	Andrew Haveron	Natsumi Tamai	
2001	Baiba Skride (Tchaikovsky)	Kam Ning	Barnabás Kelemen	Alina Pogostkin	Ning Feng	
2005	Sergey Khachatryan (Shostakovich 1)	Yossif Ivanov	Sophia Jaffé	Saeka Matsuyama	Mikhail Ovrutsky	
2009	Ray Chen (Tchaikovsky)	Lorenzo Gatto	Ilian Gârnet	Suyoen Kim	Nikita Borisoglebsky	
2012	Andrey Baranov (Shostakovich 1)	Tatsuki Narita	Hyun Su Shin	Esther Yoo	Tseng Yu-Chien	
2015	Lim Ji-young (Brahms)	Oleksii Semenenko	William Hagen	Tobias Feldmann	Stephen Waarts	
2019	Stella Chen (Tchaikovsky)	Timothy Chooi	Stephen Kim	Shannon Lee	Júlia Pusker	
2024	Dmytro Udovychenko (Shostakovich 1)	Joshua Brown	Elli Choi	Kevin Zhu	Julian Rhee	Minami Yoshida

=== Piano ===
Year	1st	2nd	3rd	4th	5th	6th
1938	Emil Gilels	Mary Johnstone (Moura Lympany)	Jakov Flier	Lance Dossor	Nibya Mariño Bellini	Robert Riefling
1952	Leon Fleisher	Karl Engel	Maria Tipo	Frans Brouw	Laurence Davis	Lamar Crowson
1956	Vladimir Ashkenazy	John Browning	Andrzej Czajkowski	Cécile Ousset	Lazar Berman	Tamas Vasary
1960	Malcolm Frager	Ronald Turini	Lee Luvisi	Alice Mitchenko	Gábor Gabos	Shirley Seguin
1964	Evgeny Mogilevsky	Nikolai Petrov	Jean-Claude Vanden Eynden	Anton Kuerti	Richard Syracuse	Michael Ponti
1968	Ekaterina Novitskaya	Valère Kamychov	Jeffrey Siegel	Semion Kroutchine	André De Groote	François-Joël Thiollier
1972	Valery Afanassiev	Jeffrey Swann	Joseph Alfidi	David Lively	Svetlana Navasardyan	Ikuyo Kamiya
1975	Mikhaïl Faerman	Stanislav Igolinsky	Youri Egorov	Larry Michael Graham	Sergueï Iuchkevitch	Olivier Gardon
1978	Abdel Rahman El Bacha	Gregory Allen	Brigitte Engerer	Alan Weiss	Douglas Finch	Robert Groslot
1983	Pierre-Alain Volondat	Wolfgang Manz	Boyan Vodenitcharov	Daniel Blumenthal	Eliane Rodrigues	Sergei Edelmann
1987	Andrei Nikolsky	Akira Wakabayashi	Rolf Plagge	Johan Schmidt	Ikuyo Nakamichi	Mi-Joo Lee
1991	Frank Braley	Stephen Prutsman	Brian Ganz	Hae-sun Paik	Alexander Melnikov	Igor Ardasev
1995	Markus Groh	Laura Mikkola	Giovanni Bellucci	Yuliya Gorenman	Jong Hwa Park	Victor Lyadov
1999	Vitaly Samoshko	Alexander Ghindin	Ning An	Shai Wosner	Roberto Cominati	Vladimir Sverdlov
2003	Severin von Eckardstein	Wen-Yu Shen	Unawarded after Dong-Hyek Lim refused it	Roberto Giordano	Kazumasa Matsumoto	Valentina Igoshina
2007	Anna Vinnitskaya	Plamena Mangova	Francesco Piemontesi	Ilya Rashkovsky	Lim Hyo-Sun	Liebrecht Vanbeckevoort
2010	Denis Kozhukhin	Evgeni Bozhanov	Hannes Minnaar	Yury Favorin	Kim Tae-Hyung	Da Sol Kim
2013	Boris Giltburg	Rémi Geniet	Mateusz Borowiak	Stanislav Khristenko	Zhang Zuo	Andrew Tyson
2016	Lukáš Vondráček	Henry Kramer	Alexander Beyer	Chi-Ho Han	Aljoša Jurinić	Alberto Ferro
2021	Jonathan Fournel	Sergei Redkin	Keigo Mukawa	Tomoki Sakata	Vitaly Starikov	Dmitry Sin
2025	Nikola Meeuwsen	Wataru Hisasue	Valère Burnon	Arthur Hinnewinkel	Masaya Kamei	Sergey Tanin

=== Voice / Singing ===
Year	1st	2nd	3rd	4th	5th
1988	Aga Wińska	Jeanette Thompson	Huub Claessens	Jacob Will	Yvonne Schiffelers
1992	Thierry Félix	Reginaldo Pinheiro	Wendy Hoffman	Regina Nathan	Cristina Gallardo-Domâs
1996	Stephen Salters	Ana Camelia Ștefănescu	Eleni Matos	Mariana Zvetkova	Ray Wade
2000	Marie-Nicole Lemieux	Marius Brenciu	Olga Pasichnyk	Pierre-Yves Pruvot	Lubana Al Quntar
2004	Iwona Sobotka	Hélène Guilmette	Shadi Torbey	Teodora Gheorghiu	Diana Axentii
2008	Szabolcs Brickner	Isabelle Druet	Bernadetta Grabias	Anna Kasyan	Yury Haradzetski
2011	Haeran Hong	Thomas Blondelle	Elena Galitskaya	Anaïk Morel	Konstantin Shushakov
2014	Sumi Hwang	Jodie Devos	Sarah Laulan	Yu Shao	Hera Hyesang Park
2018	Samuel Hasselhorn	Eva Zaïcik	Ao Li	Rocío Pérez	Héloïse Mas
2023	Taehan Kim	Jasmin White	Julia Muzychenko-Greenhalgh	Floriane Hasler	Inho Jeong

=== Cello ===
Year	1st	2nd	3rd	4th	5th	6th
2017	Victor Julien-Laferrière (Shostakovich 1)	Yuya Okamoto	Santiago Cañón	Aurélien Pascal	Ivan Karizna	Brannon Cho
2022	Hayoung Choi (Lutosławski)	Yibai Chen	Marcel Johannes Kits	Oleksiy Shadrin	Petar Pejcic	Bryan Cheng
2026	Ettore Pagano (Prokofiev Sinfonia Concertante)	Tae-Yeon Kim	Leland Ko	Álvaro Lozano Cames	Yo Kitamura	Maria Zaitseva

=== Composition ===
The first international Queen Elisabeth Competition for composition was held in 1953. Composition competitions had less laureates or finalists, with usually only the winners who see their winning piece performed in the final of the competitions for instrumentalists receiving broad media attention.

Year	Category	1st	Work
1953	Composition for symphony orchestra	Michał Spisak	Serenade
1957	Composition for symphony orchestra	Orazio Fiume	Concerto per orchestra
1957	Composition for chamber orchestra	Michał Spisak	Concerto giocoso
1961	Composition for symphony orchestra	Albert Delvaux	Sinfonia burlesca
1961	Composition for chamber orchestra	Giorgio Cambissa	Concerto per ochestra da camera n. 3
1965	Composition for symphony orchestra	Rudolf Brucci	Synfonia lesta
1965	Composition for violin and orchestra	Wilhelm Georg Berger	Concert
1969	Composition for symphony orchestra	Nicolae Beloiu	Symphonie en deux mouvements
1969	Composition for piano and orchestra	Ray E. Luke	Concerto for piano
1977	Composition for symphony orchestra	Hiro Fujikake	Rope Crest
1977	Composition for string quartet	Akira Nishimura	Heterophony
1982	Composition for symphony orchestra	John Weeks	Five Litanies for Orchestra
1991	Composition	Tristan-Patrice Challulau	Ne la città dolente
1993	Composition	Piet Swerts	Zodiac
1995	Composition	John Weeks	Requiescat
1997	Composition	Hendrik Hofmeyr	Raptus
1999	Composition	Uljas Pulkkis	Tears of Ludovico
2001	Composition	Søren Nils Eichberg	Qilaatersorneq
2002	Composition	Ian Munro	Piano Concerto Dreams
2004	Composition	Javier Torres Maldonado	Obscuro Etiamtum Lumine
2006	Composition	Miguel Gálvez-Taroncher	La luna y la muerte
2008	Composition	Cho Eun-hwa	Agens
2009	Composition	Jeon Minje	Target
2011	Composition	Kenji Sakai	Concerto pour violon et orchestre
2012	Composition	Michel Petrossian	In the wake of Ea pour piano et orchestre

== Media coverage and prizes awarded by audiences ==
The competition was covered on the Belgian radio from its first edition, the press writing about contestants and their performances. Broadcasting via television expanded in the 1960s. French-language and Dutch-language Belgian broadcasting organizations started to award prizes based on the preferences of their audiences from 1975 and 1991 respectively. Abdel Rahman El Bacha, Pierre-Alain Volondat, Severin von Eckardstein and Denis Kozhukhin were among the few contestants that were as convincing to the competition jury as to the general audience. Recorded performances were commercialised from 1967. In the 21st century recordings of the competitors' performances were streamed live on the internet and/or made available as video or audio downloads, followed by social media discussions.

== See also ==
- List of classical music competitions
- Queen Elisabeth Music Chapel
- Queen Fabiola Competition
