= Semyon Snitkovsky =

Soviet violinist and professor

- Born: August 9, 1933; Odessa, Soviet Union
- Died: April 4, 1981 (aged 47) Moscow, Soviet Union
- Genres: Classical
- Occupations: Violinist, Soloist, Pedagogue

Semyon Snitkovsky (Rus: Семён Снитковский; August 9, 1933 in Odessa – April 4, 1981 in Moscow) was a Ukrainian Soviet classical violinist and a professor.

== Biography ==
Semyon (Semion) Snitkovsky's formal music education began in 1940 at Stolyarsky Music School. After an ensuing hiatus that was brought on by World War II, he was accepted into a class of Veniamin Zinovievich Mordkovich. In three years he performed his first solo recital, and in 1951 entered Odessa Conservatory, where he also studied with professor Mordkovich. In the early fifties Snitkovsky was already a soloist with the Odessa Philharmonic Orchestra.

In 1956, after his performance at the recital of the best Ukrainian music colleges' graduates, he became a soloist of the Lviv Philharmonic and a teacher at the Lviv Conservatory. In 1957 Snitkovsky was accepted into the Moscow Conservatory as a postgraduate student. He started studying there with David Oistrakh, and almost immediately became Oistrakh's assistant. A few years later he received a doctorate and full professorship at the Conservatory.

In 1957 he became a laureate of the All-Union competition, subsequently winning a bronze medal at the World Festival of Youth and Students in Moscow. 1958 brought his first international success, at the competition for young musicians in Bucharest – within the framework of the International Festival named after Romanian musician, George Enescu. Snitkovsky won 1st prize, which he shared with Romanian born Hungarian violinist Stephan Ruha. He also, along with the pianist Olga Stupakova, won the second prize for the best performance of Enesco’s Third Sonata for violin and piano.

In 1963 Snitkovsky received second prize at the Queen Elisabeth Competition. After the competition the newspaper "Le Soir" wrote: "Snitkovsky brings to the composer’s concept a soaring luminosity ...a technical aspect making a brilliant impression". In 1967, the International Foundation of Eugène Ysaÿe in Belgium awarded Snitkovsky a gold medal – an honor bestowed only once every five years.

Snitkovsky died in 1981, age 47, at the height of his creative abilities.

== Creative achievements ==
At first, bright gift of Semyon Snitkovsky was highly praised by critics at the George Enescu International Competition:"...his seemingly effortless technique combined with a profound comprehension of modern music has allowed Snitkovsky to achieve outstanding success", wrote the various Romanian newspapers. Snitkovsky’s performance of Glazunov’s violin concerto at the competition’s finale was labeled "perfect".

During the 1960s and 1970s, Snitkovsky’s mastery reached heights. Aficionados and experts alike were conquered by the depth and uniqueness of his interpretation, the highly charged emotional content, "speech expressiveness", and the flexibility of his phrasing. His repertoire quickly expanded and, as musicians then would proclaim, Snitkovsky excellently plays anything and all composed for violin in the past 300 years – from Corelli and Lekler to then young Rodion Shchedrin". Snitkovsky’s program included his performance of Bach, Mozart, Beethoven or 19th century romantics, Tchaikovsky or Glazunov was always an art event.

Snitkovsky played the music of 20th century classics including Stravinsky, Shostakovich, Prokofiev, Bartok, Hindemith, Britten, Villa-Lobos – their innovative opuses which at this time not widely understood. Music of the soviet composers such as A. Khachaturian, D. Kabalevsky, M. Vainberg and V. Salmanov, also the newest and specially written for Snitkovsky pieces were included in his repertoire as well.

Snitkovsky performed with many large orchestras and famous conductors, such as Nathan Rakhlin, André Cluytens, Gennady Rozhdestvensky, and Karel Ančerl. André Cluytens said once after performing with Snitkovsky, "It is a great pleasure to play with such an outstanding artist as Semyon Snitkovsky. I will always be happy to make music with this brilliant musician".

Snitkovsky regarded his teaching career with the same inspiration and devotion as his performing one. Snitkovsky brought new input to violin teaching, there were many serious musicians among his students. While a professor at the Moscow Conservatory, from 1976 he was also a professor of violin class at the Liszt Music Academy in Budapest. Snitkovsky taught many master-classes and instructional courses in different countries with great success. Quoting one of the articles about his participation in the concerts and master-classes in Tour (France): "Snitkovsky is not only an outstanding virtuoso, but is a great teacher".

Soviet and foreign press excitingly praised him. There are short quotations from the hundreds of publications: "Soviet music" magazine notes his honorable style, excellent technique, beautiful sound and uniqueness of the phrasing. In 1977 after Snitkovsky triumphantly performed in Zurich, German newspaper "Tages Anzieger" stated that Snitkovsky is one of the greatest violin players of his generation, calling his performance of excerpts from Stravinsky’s "Petrushka" "the fireworks of violin virtuosity that impresses with almost inhuman perfection". "Le Figaro" called Snitkovsky’s Parisian concerts an "eye opener".

To commemorate Snitkovsky’s seventy-fifth birthday, recording company "Melodia" issued a set of CDs containing his recordings of Bach, Paganini, Schumann, Shubert, Liszt, Bartok, Stravinsky, Khachaturian, Ysaÿe, Debussy, etc.
