= Yakov Flier =

Jewish Russian concert pianist (1912–1977)

- Яков Флиер
- Born: October 21, 1912; Orekhovo-Zuyevo, Russian Empire
- Died: December 18, 1977 (aged 65); Moscow, Russian SFSR, Soviet Union
- Occupations: Classical pianist; Academic teacher

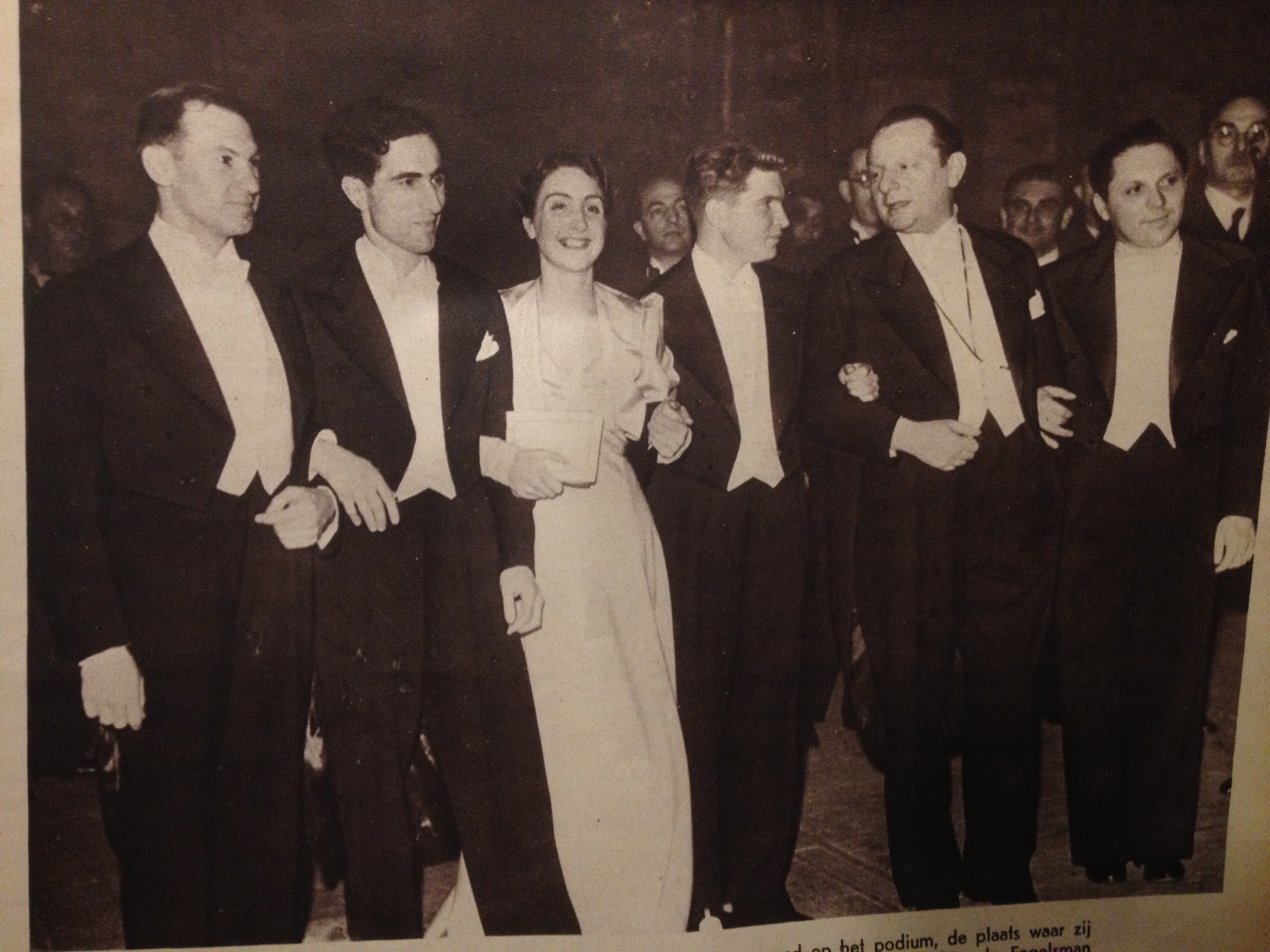
Left to right: Lance Dossor, Yacob Flier, Moura Lympany, Emile Gilels, André Dumortier, and Arturo Michelangeli at the 1938 Queen Elisabeth Competition in Brussels.

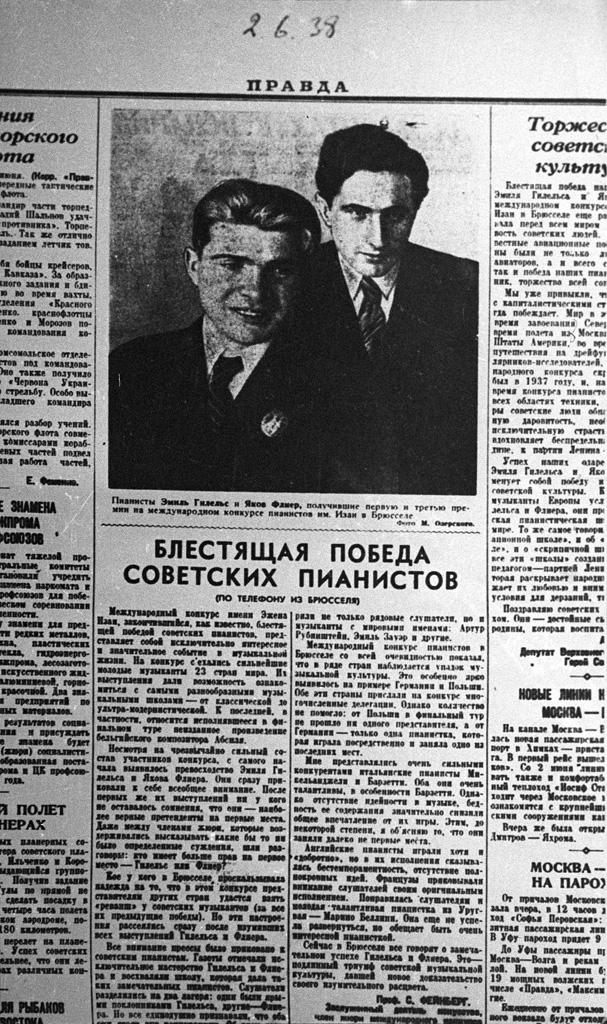
Photo of pianists Emil Gilels and Yakov Flier (right) who took first and third prizes at the Queen Elizabeth international contest in Brussels. Pravda newspaper (Soviet Union). May 1938.

Yakov Vladimirovich Flier (Note: Russian: Яков Владимирович Флиер, romanized: Yakov Vladimirovich Fliyer) (October 21 [O.S. October 8], 1912 – December 18, 1977) was a Soviet concert pianist and teacher.

Flier was born in Orekhovo-Zuyevo, Russia. Growing up, he first began teaching himself piano but soon began formal study with the pianist Sergei Nikanorovich Korsakov. Because of his expedited development, at the age of 11, he entered the Central Music School of the Moscow Conservatory, studying with Grigory Prokofiev, pianist and music psychologist, and then later with Sergey Kozlovsky. In 1928, he advanced and entered into study at the larger conservatory, studying under Konstantin Igumnov. His graduating performance in 1934 was extremely well attended, and soon after his career leading him to enroll in high-profile competitions. In 1935 Flier won the All-Union Piano Competition in Leningrad and became known throughout the country. In 1936 he took part in the Vienna International Piano Competition, where he won first place ahead of Emil Gilels, and in 1938 he took third place at the Queen Elisabeth Competition in Brussels.

By the 1930s, he had become one of the most prominent Russian concert pianists. He mainly performed Romantic music, although he also played some works by contemporary Russian composers Dmitry Kabalevsky, Dmitri Shostakovich, German Galynin, Sergei Prokofiev and Rodion Shchedrin.

He taught piano for many years at the Moscow Conservatory from 1937, although beginning in 1965, Flier was appointed head of one of the conservatory's several piano departments. He would continue his teaching duties until 1959. However, as a performer he stopped public concert in 1949 due to personal illness.

He was a contemporary of and sometime rival to Emil Gilels. In the 1960s and 1970s, Flier began to perform in Europe. During his concert tour in the USA he performed Sergei Rachmaninoff's Third Piano Concerto with the New York Philharmonic conducted by Leonard Bernstein.

He died in 1977 in Moscow, aged 65.

== Students ==
- Rodion Shchedrin
- Viktoria Postnikova
- Mikhail Pletnev
- Lev Vlassenko
- Natasha Vlassenko
- Tatiana Ryumina
- Mikhaïl Faerman
- Bella Davidovich
- Sergey Musaelyan
- Regina Shamvili
- Shoshana Rudiakov
- Mikhail Rudy
- Mark Zeltser
- Vladimir Feltsman
- Samvel Alumyan
- Mūza Rubackytė
- Ilze Graubina
- Arnis Zandmanis
- Luba Edlina

== Awards ==
- 1935: First Place in The 2nd All-Union Competition of Performing Musicians (Leningrad)
- 1936: First Place in The Vienna International Competition
- 1938: Third Place in The Eugene Ysaÿe Brussels International Competition
- 1946: Order of the Red Banner of Labor
- 1947: Honored Artist of the RSFSR
- 1966: People's Artist of the USSR
