= Julian Sitkovetsky =

Soviet violinist (1925–1958)

- Born: 7 November 1925; Kiev
- Died: 23 February 1958 (aged 32) Moscow
- Genres: Classical music
- Instrument: violin
- Years active: 1933–1956

Julian (or Yulian) Grigoryevich Sitkovetsky (7 November 1925 – 23 February 1958) was a Soviet violinist.

== Biography ==
Sitkovetsky was born in Kiev. He started violin lesson at age 4, first with his father, then with David Bertie at the Central School in Kiev (Ukrainian SSR, Soviet Union). As a child prodigy, he was chosen to play for Jacques Thibaud at age 8. One year later, he played the Mendelssohn concerto with the Kiev Symphony. In 1939, he enrolled in the Moscow Central Music School, class of Abram Yampolsky, whose students included Leonid Kogan, Igor Besrodny and Rostislav Dubinsky.

In 1945 Julian Sitkovetsky won the All Soviet Union Young Performers Competition of piano, cello and violin (Sviatoslav Richter and Mstislav Rostropovich were the winners in piano and cello). In 1947, he shared First Prize at the Prague Festival with Leonid Kogan and Igor Besrodny.

He married pianist Bella Davidovich in 1950 and their son Dmitry Sitkovetsky (who became an eminent violinist and conductor) was born four years later.

In 1952, he shared second prize in the Henryk Wieniawski Violin Competition with Wanda Wiłkomirska (first prize was Igor Oistrakh). In 1955 he won Second Prize at the Queen Elizabeth Music Competition. (Of which Yehudi Menuhin said: "...David Oistrakh and I were on the jury...he should have had First Prize...").

Sitkovetsky never toured much, as he was diagnosed with lung cancer in 1956. He died in Moscow in 1958 at age 32.

== Legacy ==
Joseph Magil in the American Record Guide said of Sitkovetsky : "...David Oistrakh said that, had he lived, Sitkovetsky would have eclipsed him and Kogan... He had a broad, firm, focused tone in all registers; flawless intonation; a rapid, even trill; a swift, perfectly controlled staccato; strong, immaculate harmonics; an even, clear sautillé..."
