= Emil Gilels =

Soviet pianist (1916–1985)

Emil Gilels Эмиль Гилельс
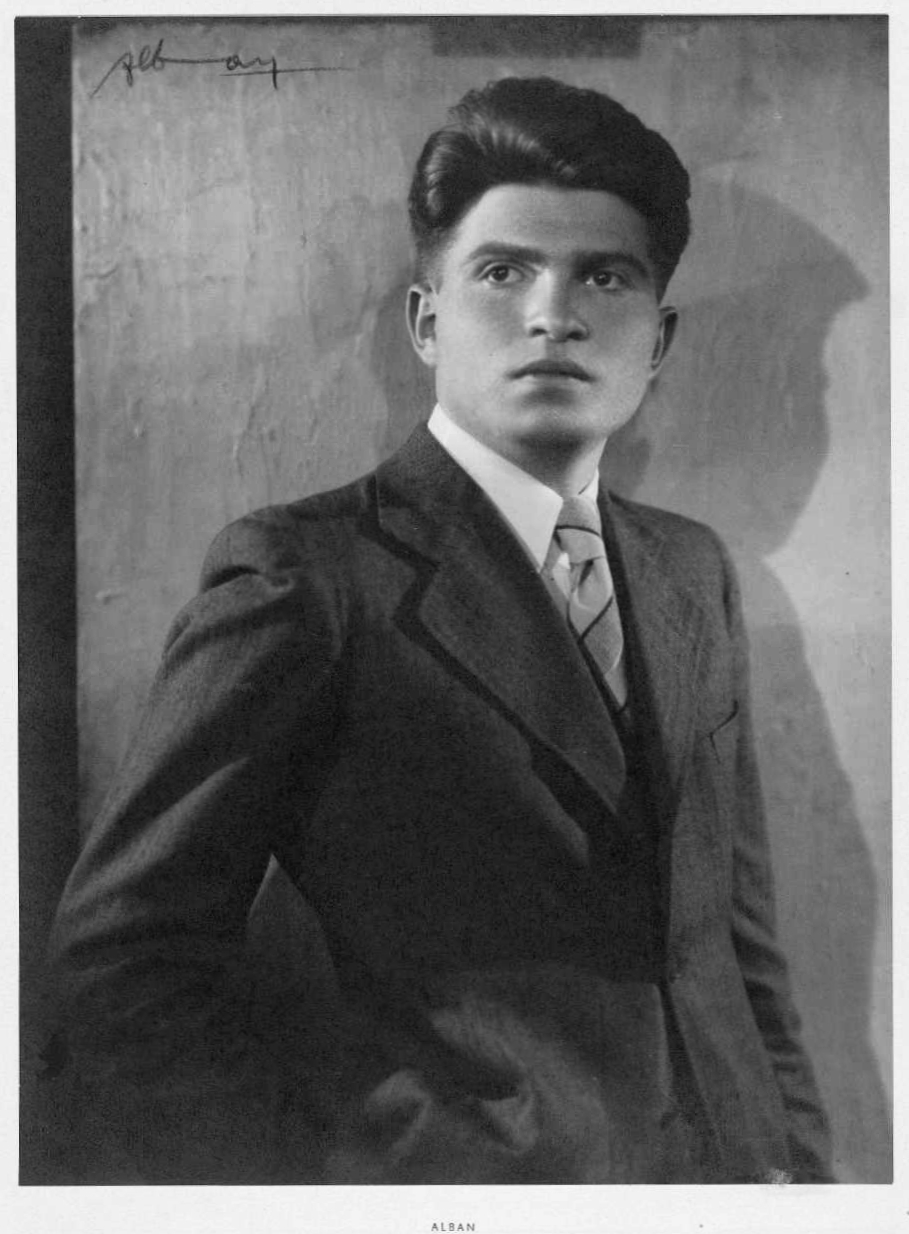
- Gilels in 1939

Background information
- Born: Samuil Grigoryevich Gilels; October 19, 1916; Odessa, Russian Empire
- Died: October 14, 1985 (aged 68) Moscow, Russian SFSR, Soviet Union
- Genre: Classical
- Occupation: Pianist
- Instrument: Piano

Emil Grigoryevich Gilels (Note: Russian: Эмиль Григорьевич Гилельс, romanized: Emil Grigoryevich Gilels; Ukrainian: Еміль Григорович Гілельс, romanized: Emil Hryhorovych Hilels) (19 October [O.S. 6 October] 1916 – 14 October 1985; born Samuil) (Note: Russian: Самуил, romanized: Samuil) was a Russian and Soviet pianist. He is widely regarded as one of the greatest pianists of all time. His sister Elizabeth, three years his junior, was a violinist. His daughter Elena became a pianist.

== Early life and education ==
Gilels was born to a Jewish family on 19 October [O.S. 6 October] 1916 in Odessa in the Russian Empire (present-day Ukraine) to Gesya and Grigory Gilels. His father worked as a clerk in a sugar refinery.

Gilels had perfect pitch, and at the age of five-and-a-half, he began lessons with Yakov Isaakovich Tkach, a piano pedagogue in Odessa. A quick learner, he was playing all three volumes of Loeschhorn's studies within a few months, and soon afterwards Clementi and Mozart sonatinas. Gilels later credited this strict training with Tkach for establishing the foundation of his technique. In turn, Tkach commented of Gilels, using a diminutive, "Milya Gilels possesses the abilities of one who is born solely for the purpose of becoming a pianist, and that with the required attention to his development, the USSR would in the future enrich itself with the acquisition of a world-renowned pianist."

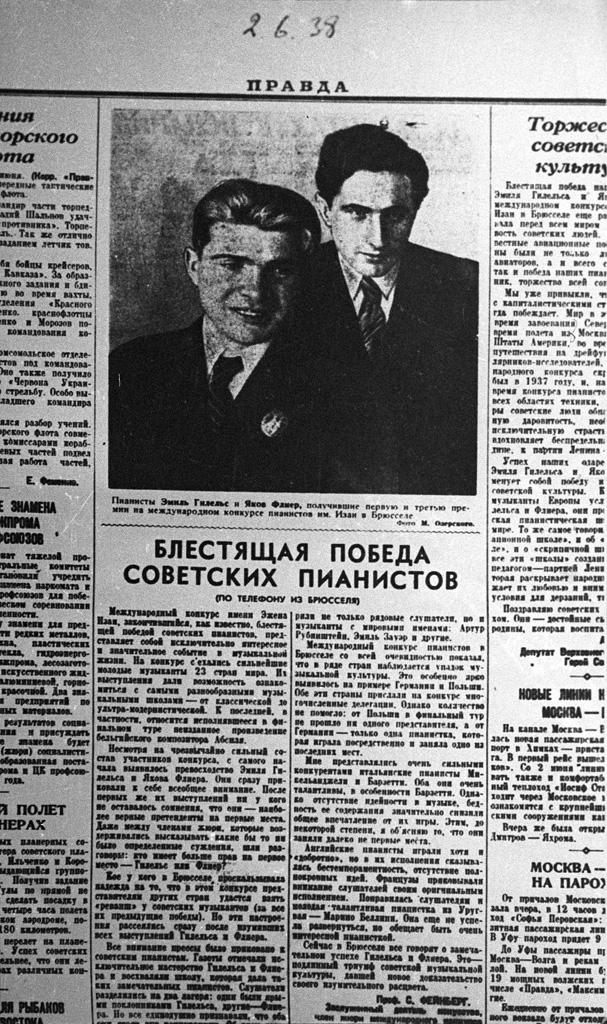
Pianists Emil Gilels (left) and Yakov Flier who took first and third prizes respectively at the Queen Elisabeth International Music Competition in Brussels, Belgium. Pravda newspaper (Soviet Union). May 1938.

In May 1929, aged 12, Gilels gave his first public concert. In 1929, Gilels was accepted to the Odessa Conservatory into the class of Bertha Reingbald. Under the tutelage of Reingbald, Gilels broadened his range of cultural interests, with a particular aptitude for history and literature. In 1932, Arthur Rubinstein visited the Odessa Conservatory and met Gilels, and the two of them remained friends through the remainder of Rubinstein's life. Like Tkach, Reingbald carefully guided Gilels in terms of allowing him to give live concerts, and protected her student from excessive concert performances. He competed in the All-Soviet piano competition, despite being below the age limit to participate, but won a scholarship from the jury.

In 1932, Gilels first visited Heinrich Neuhaus. In 1933, Gilels participated in the First All-Union Competition of Performers in Moscow, and won first prize by unanimous decision. This win made Gilels famous throughout the USSR, and led to a nationwide concert tour. However, the stresses of touring led Gilels to curtail his touring and to return to Odessa, to conclude his studies, even declining an invitation to transfer to the Moscow Conservatory. Gilels subsequently regarded Reingbald as his true teacher, mentor and lifelong friend.

Gilels graduated from the Odessa Conservatory in the autumn of 1935. Subsequently, he was accepted into the class of Heinrich Neuhaus as a postgraduate student at the Moscow Conservatory, and Gilels renewed his commitment to giving concerts. In 1936, he participated in his first international competition, the International Vienna Music Academy Competition. Gilels took the second place award, while his friend and fellow student Yakov Flier was the first prize winner. Two years later, in 1938, both Gilels and Flier participated in the Ysaÿe International Festival (Queen Elisabeth Competition) in Brussels. Gilels was awarded first prize, and Flier took third prize. Gilels completed his studies in Moscow in 1938.

== Career ==
Following his activities in Brussels, a scheduled tour and American debut at the 1939 New York World's Fair was aborted because of the outbreak of the Second World War. Sergei Rachmaninoff, living in exile from Russia, had heard of the reputation of Gilels, and began to listen to Gilels' radio performances. Rachmaninoff subsequently regarded Gilels as his pianistic successor, and sent him his medal and diploma. This medal, engraved with the profile of Anton Rubinstein, and the diploma were once presented to Rachmaninoff to symbolize his succession from Rubinstein, and Rachmaninoff himself added Gilels’ name to the document. Gilels treasured these relics all his life.

In 1944, Gilels premiered Prokofiev's 8th Piano Sonata. During World War II, Gilels entertained Soviet troops with morale-boosting open-air recitals on the frontline, of which film archive footage exists. In 1945, he formed a chamber music trio with the violinist Leonid Kogan (his brother-in-law) and the cellist Mstislav Rostropovich. Gilels was awarded the Stalin Prize in 1946. After the war, he toured the Soviet Bloc countries of Eastern Europe as a soloist. He also gave two-piano recitals with Yakov Flier, as well as concerts with his violinist sister, Elizaveta. In 1952, he became a professor at the Moscow Conservatory, where his students included Valery Afanassiev, Irina Zaritskaya, Marina Goglidze-Mdivani, Irina Smorodinova (a Laureate of the International Marguerite Long-Jacques Thibaud piano competition in Paris), Igor Zhukov, Vladimir Blok and Felix Gottlieb. He was chair of the jury of the International Tchaikovsky Competition at the inaugural competition in 1958, which awarded first prize to Van Cliburn. He presided over the competition for many years.

Gilels was one of the first Soviet artists, along with David Oistrakh, allowed to travel and give concerts in the West. His American debut was in October 1955, with the Philadelphia Orchestra and Eugene Ormandy. His British debut was in Coventry in 1951, where he performed alongside Igor Oistrakh, Galina Vischnevskaya, Mark Reizen and the composer Kabalevsky. In 1952 he played at the Royal Albert Hall. Gilels made his Salzburg Festival debut in 1969 with a piano recital of Weber, Prokofiev and Beethoven at the Mozarteum concert hall, followed by a performance of Beethoven's Third Piano Concerto with George Szell and the Vienna Philharmonic Orchestra.

In 1981, Gilels suffered a heart attack after a recital at the Concertgebouw in Amsterdam and suffered declining health thereafter. He died unexpectedly during a medical checkup in Moscow on 14 October 1985, only a few days before his 69th birthday. Sviatoslav Richter, who knew Gilels well and was a fellow student in the class of Heinrich Neuhaus at the Moscow Conservatory, believed that Gilels was killed accidentally when a drug was wrongly injected during a routine checkup, at the Kremlin hospital. However, Danish composer and writer Karl Aage Rasmussen, in his biography of Richter, denies this possibility and contends that it was just a false rumour.

Gilels was married twice. He was first married to pianist Rosa Tamarkina in 1940. His second wife was Fariset (Lala) Hutsistova, a graduate of Moscow Conservatoire, whom he married in 1947. They had a daughter, Elena, a pianist who graduated from Flier’s class at the Moscow Conservatoire, and who performed and recorded with her father.

== Recordings ==
Gilels is universally admired for his superb technical control and burnished tone. Gilels had a repertoire ranging from baroque to late Romantic and 20th century classical composers. His interpretations of the central German-Austrian classics formed the core of his repertoire, in particular Beethoven, Brahms, and Schumann; but he was equally illuminative with Scarlatti and 20th-century composers such as Debussy, Rachmaninoff, and Prokofiev. His recordings of Liszt's Hungarian Rhapsody No. 9 and Sonata in B minor have acquired classic status in some circles.

Gilels' recordings for most of his recording history were for the state record company for classical music repertoire, Melodiya. These recordings, in turn, were licensed in the west under EMI Records, and in the United States under Angel Records (and EMI's budget Seraphim Records). In 2013 Warner Classics absorbed EMI Classics, thereby acquiring the bulk of Gilels' recordings.

Gilels was in the midst of completing a recording cycle of Beethoven's piano sonatas for the German record company Deutsche Grammophon when he died unexpectedly in a hospital in Moscow. His recording of the "Hammerklavier" Sonata received a Gramophone Award in 1984. Gilels recorded with his daughter, including Mozart's double piano concerto with Karl Böhm and the Vienna Philharmonic and Schubert's Fantasie in F minor for piano duet. He also made some chamber-music recordings with the violinist Leonid Kogan and the cellist Mstislav Rostropovich.

=== Notable recordings ===
- 1935 – Liszt: Fantasia on Themes from Mozart's Marriage of Figaro
- 1951 – Liszt: Hungarian Rhapsody No. 9
- 1954 – Saint-Saëns: Piano Concerto No. 2 in G minor, Op. 22 (cond. Cluytens)*
- 1954 – Medtner: Piano Sonata No. 5 in G Minor, Op. 22
- 1955 – Tchaikovsky: Piano Concerto No. 1 [cond. Fritz Reiner]
- 1955 – Rachmaninoff: Piano Concerto No. 3 in D minor, Op. 30 (cond. Cluytens)
- 1957 – Beethoven: Piano Concerto No. 4 (cond. Ludwig)
- 1957 – Scriabin: Piano Sonata No. 4 in F sharp major, Op. 30*
- 1957 – Weinberg: Piano Sonata No. 4 in B Minor
- 1968 – Beethoven: Piano Concertos 1–5; solo piano pieces (Beethoven) (Cleveland Orchestra cond. George Szell)
- 1958 – Brahms: Piano Concerto No. 2 in B flat major, Op. 83 (cond. Reiner)
- 1961 – Bach: Prelude in B minor (BWV 855; arr. Siloti) (Moscow)*
- 1968 – Medtner: Piano Sonata No. 10 in A minor, Op. 38 No. 1 ("Sonata Reminiscenza") (Moscow)*
- 1968 – Liszt: Rhapsodie espagnole (Leningrad)*
- 1971 – Brahms: Piano Concerto No. 2 in B flat major, Op. 83 (cond. Mario Rossi) (Köln)*
- 1970 – Beethoven: Piano Concerto No. 3 in C Minor, Op. 37, Live Recording Lausanne, (Orchestre National de l'ORTF), (Claves Records)
- 1971 – Mozart: Piano Sonata No. 8 in A minor, KV 310 (Ossiach)*
- 1972 – Tchaikovsky: Piano Concerto No. 2 in G major, Op. 44 (cond. Maazel)
- 1972 – Beethoven Piano Sonata No. 21 in C major, Op. 53 Waldstein
- 1972 – Brahms: Piano Concerto No. 1 in D minor, Op. 15 and Piano Concerto No. 2 in B flat major, Op. 83 (cond. Jochum)
- 1973 – Beethoven: Piano Sonata No. 23 in F minor, Op. 57 ("Appassionata")
- 1973 – Debussy: Images, Book 1*
- 1973 – Mozart: Piano Concerto No. 27 in B flat major, K595 (cond. Boehm)
- 1974 – Grieg: Lyric Pieces
- 1974 – Prokofiev: Sonata No. 3 in a minor, Op. 28 (Köln)*
- 1974 – Prokofiev: Sonata No. 8 in B flat major, Op. 84
- 1976 – Schubert: Forellenquintett ("Trout Quintet") Quintet for Piano, Violin, Viola, Violoncello, and Contrabass in A major D667 (with Amadeus Quartet)
- 1977 – Rachmaninoff, Prelude in C-sharp minor Op. 3 No. 2 (Moscow)*
- 1978 – Chopin: Piano Sonata No. 3 in B minor, Op. 58
- 1979 – Tchaikovsky: Piano Concerto No. 1 (New York)*
- 1982 – Beethoven: Piano Sonata No. 29 in B flat major, Op. 106 Hammerklavier (Berlin)
- 1984 – Beethoven: Piano Sonata No. 29 (Moscow)*
- 1984 – Scriabin: Piano Sonata No. 3 in F-sharp minor, Op. 23 (Moscow)*
- 1984 – Schumann: Symphonic Studies (Live in concert in Japan)
- 1985 – Beethoven: Piano Concerto No. 5 in E flat, Op. 73

== Prizes, awards and honors ==
Soviet Union

- 1st Prize, All-Soviet Union Piano Competition, 1933;
- 2nd Prize, Vienna International Piano Competition, 1936;
- 1st Prize, Concours Eugène Ysaÿe, Brussels, 1938;
- Stalin Prize, USSR, 1946;
- People's Artist of the USSR, 1954;
- Three Orders of Lenin, USSR, including 1961;
- Lenin Prize, 1961, 1966;
- Hero of Socialist Labour, 1976;
- Order of the Red Banner of Labour;
- Order of the Friendship of Peoples, 1981;
- Order of the Badge of Honour.

Foreign

- Commandeur, Ordre de Mérite Culturel et Artistique de Paris, 1967;
- Gold Medal of the City of Paris, France;
- Order of Leopold, Belgium, 1968;
- Honorary Member, Accademia Nazionale di Santa Cecilia, Rome;
- Honorary Member, Royal Academy of Music, London;
- Honorary Professor, Franz Liszt Academy of Music, Budapest.

== Sources ==
- Morrison, Bryce (2001). "Gilels, Emil". Grove Music Online (8th ed.). Oxford University Press. doi:10.1093/gmo/9781561592630.article.11135. ISBN 978-1-56159-263-0. (subscription, Wikilibrary access, or UK public library membership required)
