= Pierre Doukan =

French composer and music educator (1927–1995)

Pierre Doukan (16 October 1927 - 12 October 1995) was a French classical violinist as well as a composer and a pedagogue.

He died on October 12, 1995.

== Biography ==
Born in Paris, Doukan won the first prizes for violin, chamber music and history of music at the Conservatoire de Paris (1946–1947). In 1955, he won the third prize of the Queen Elisabeth Competition and in 1957 also a prize at the Paganini Competition.

He mainly devoted himself to chamber music and several of his recordings were crowned by the Académie du disque.

In 1969, he became professor of violin at the Conservatoire de Paris at the same time as Michèle Auclair.

In 1984, he was appointed artistic director of the Orchestral Academy and in charge of the advanced course for solo violins at the Conservatoire à rayonnement régional de Paris. In 1993, he became music director of the CNR's department for preparation for orchestral careers.

Doukan composed numerous works for violin and published a violin method in several volumes.

He was married to pianist Thérèse Cochet, with whom he often played in concert and with whom he made several recordings.. Doukan died in Suresnes on 12 October 1995 at age 67.

== Bibliography ==
- Pâris, Alain (1995). Dictionnaire des interprètes et de l'interprétation musicale au XX. Bouquins (in French). Paris: Éditions Robert Laffont. p. 1278. ISBN 2-221-08064-5.
