= Devil's Trill Sonata =

Solo violin sonata by Giuseppe Tartini

- Violin sonata by Giuseppe Tartini
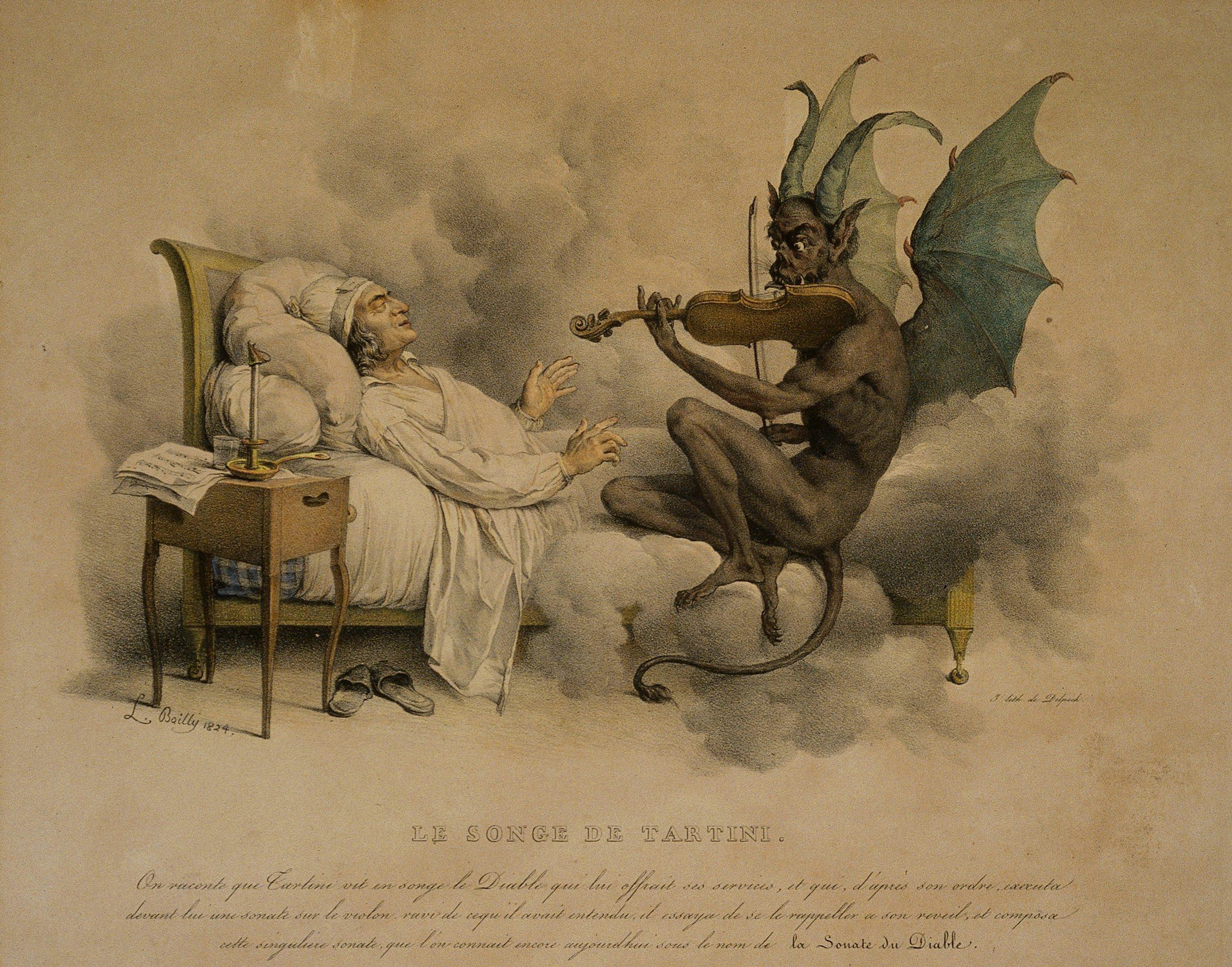
- Tartini's Dream by Louis-Léopold Boilly (1824)
- Key: G minor
- Catalogue: B.g5
- Published: 1799 in L'Art du Violon by Jean-Baptiste Cartier
- Movements: 4

The Violin Sonata in G minor, GT 2.g05; B.g5, more familiarly known as the Devil's Trill Sonata (Italian: Il trillo del diavolo), is a work for solo violin (with figured bass accompaniment) by Giuseppe Tartini (1692–1770). It is Tartini's best-known composition, notable for its technically difficult passages. A typical performance lasts 15 minutes.

== Background ==
Tartini allegedly told the French astronomer Jérôme Lalande that he had dreamed that the devil had appeared to him and had asked to be Tartini's servant and teacher. At the end of the music lesson, Tartini handed the devil his violin to test his skill, which the devil began to play with virtuosity, delivering an intense and magnificent performance. So singularly beautiful and executed with such superior taste and precision was the Devil's performance, that the composer felt his breath taken away. The complete story is told by Tartini himself in Lalande's Voyage d'un François en Italie:

One night, in the year 1713 I dreamed I had made a pact with the devil for my soul. Everything went as I wished: my new servant anticipated my every desire. Among other things, I gave him my violin to see if he could play. How great was my astonishment on hearing a sonata so wonderful and so beautiful, played with such great art and intelligence, as I had never even conceived in my boldest flights of fantasy. I felt enraptured, transported, enchanted: my breath failed me, and I awoke. I immediately grasped my violin in order to retain, in part at least, the impression of my dream. In vain! The music which I at this time composed is indeed the best that I ever wrote, and I still call it the "Devil's Trill", but the difference between it and that which so moved me is so great that I would have destroyed my instrument and have said farewell to music forever if it had been possible for me to live without the enjoyment it affords me.

Mesmerized by the devil's brilliant and awe-inspiring playing, Tartini attempted to recreate what he had heard. However, despite having said that the sonata was his favorite, Tartini later wrote that it was "so inferior to what I had heard, that if I could have subsisted on other means, I would have broken my violin and abandoned music forever." While he claimed he composed the sonata in 1713, scholars think it was likely composed as late as the 1740s, due to its stylistic maturity – the music is galant in idiom, that is, transitional between the Baroque and Classical periods. It was not published until 1798 or 1799, almost thirty years after the composer's death.

The sonata would become the basis for Cesare Pugni's 1849 ballet Le Violon du diable, as well as Chopin's Prelude No. 27.

== Structure ==
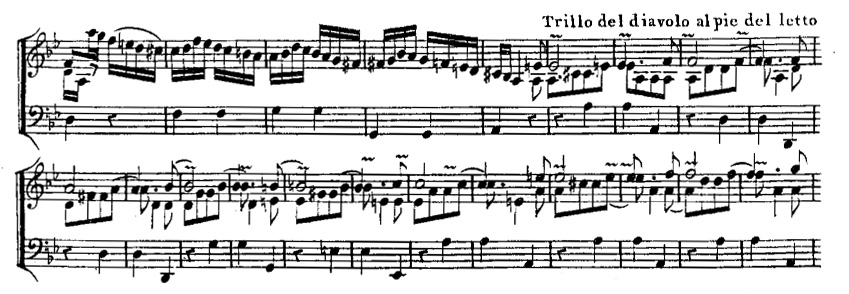
"Trill of the devil at the foot of the bed".

The sonata, written for violin with basso continuo (figured bass), is written in four movements:

1. Larghetto ma non troppo
2. Allegro moderato
3. Andante
4. Allegro assai — Andante — Allegro assai

The first movement, in 12/8 time, begins gently and reflectively, with languid double stops and a flowing violin melody line filled with tasteful embellishments. The melody, which moves from the tonic to the mediant key in the middle of the movement includes several deceptive cadences, before returning once again to a tonic theme similar to the beginning. A crisp, quick, highly decorated bravura follows, preceding a brief cantabile slow movement, said to signify Tartini's dream state.

The last movement, technically difficult, begins fast, before dissolving into repeated, modular violin melody over an intensifying accompaniment. This leads to a slow chromatic theme, followed by more sequences of the two themes. The source of the sonata's nickname is a passage where the violinist trills while simultaneously playing arpeggiated triads. The bravura cadenza that is frequently played was composed by Fritz Kreisler. The accompaniment joins the violin again for the last few dramatic measures. The trill in the last movement is one of the earliest examples of a trill illustrating a musical theme.

== See also ==
- Deal with the Devil
- Lipinski Stradivarius
- Robert Johnson

== Sources ==
Auer, Leopold, 1925, Violin Master Works and Their Interpretation, Carl Fischer, New York, repub. Dover, 2012
