= Giuseppe Tartini =

Italian composer and violinist (1692–1770)

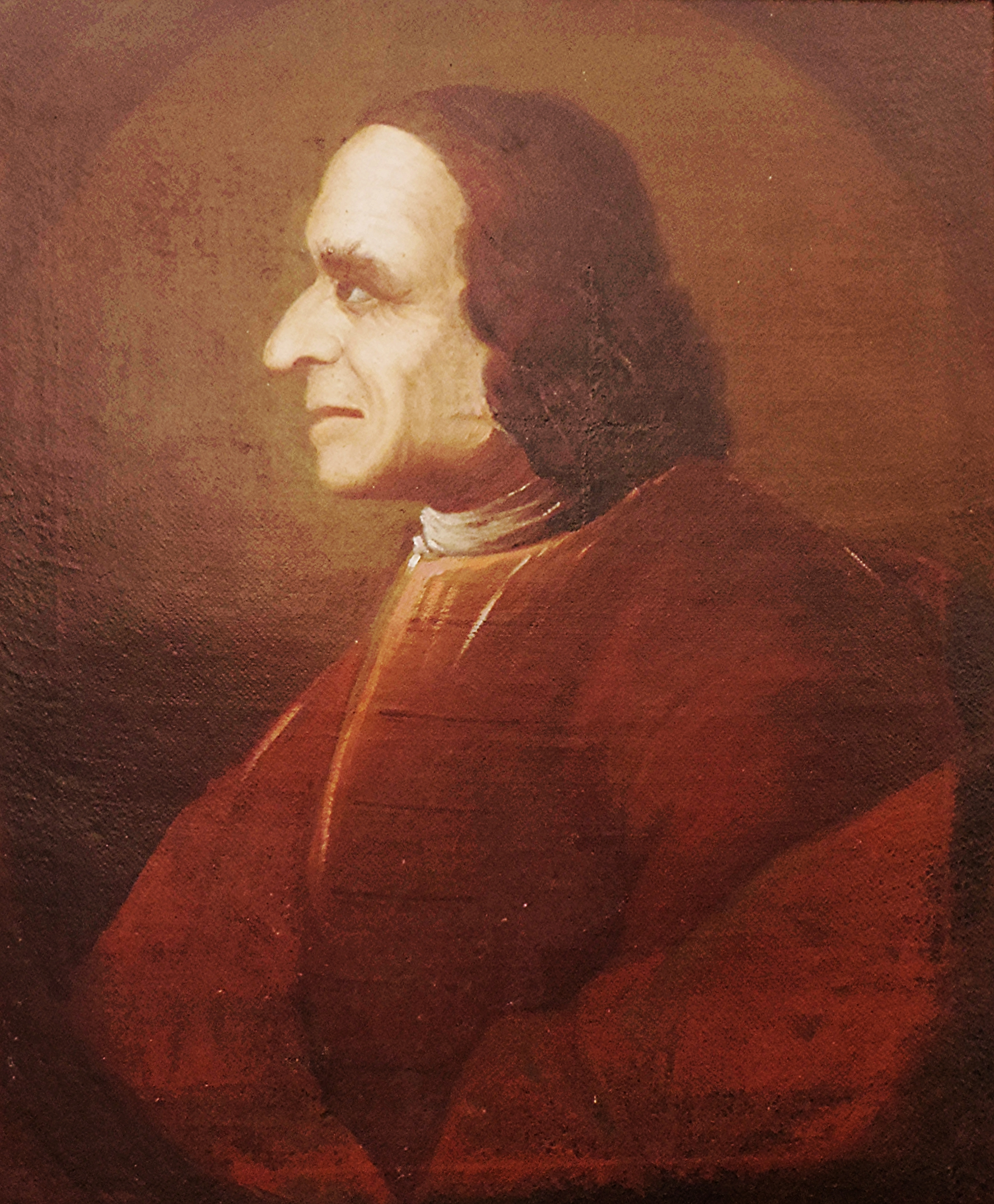
- Born: 8 April 1692; Pirano, Republic of Venice
- Died: 26 February 1770 (aged 77); Padua, Republic of Venice
- Education: University of Padua
- Occupations: Composer; director of music; violinist
- Organizations: Basilica di Sant'Antonio in Padua
- Works: Devil's Trill Sonata

Giuseppe Tartini (8 April 1692 – 26 February 1770) was an Italian composer and violinist of the Baroque era born in Pirano in the Republic of Venice (now Piran, Slovenia). Tartini was a prolific composer, composing more than a hundred pieces for the violin, the majority of them violin concertos. He is best remembered for his Violin Sonata in G Minor (the Devil's Trill Sonata).

== Early life ==
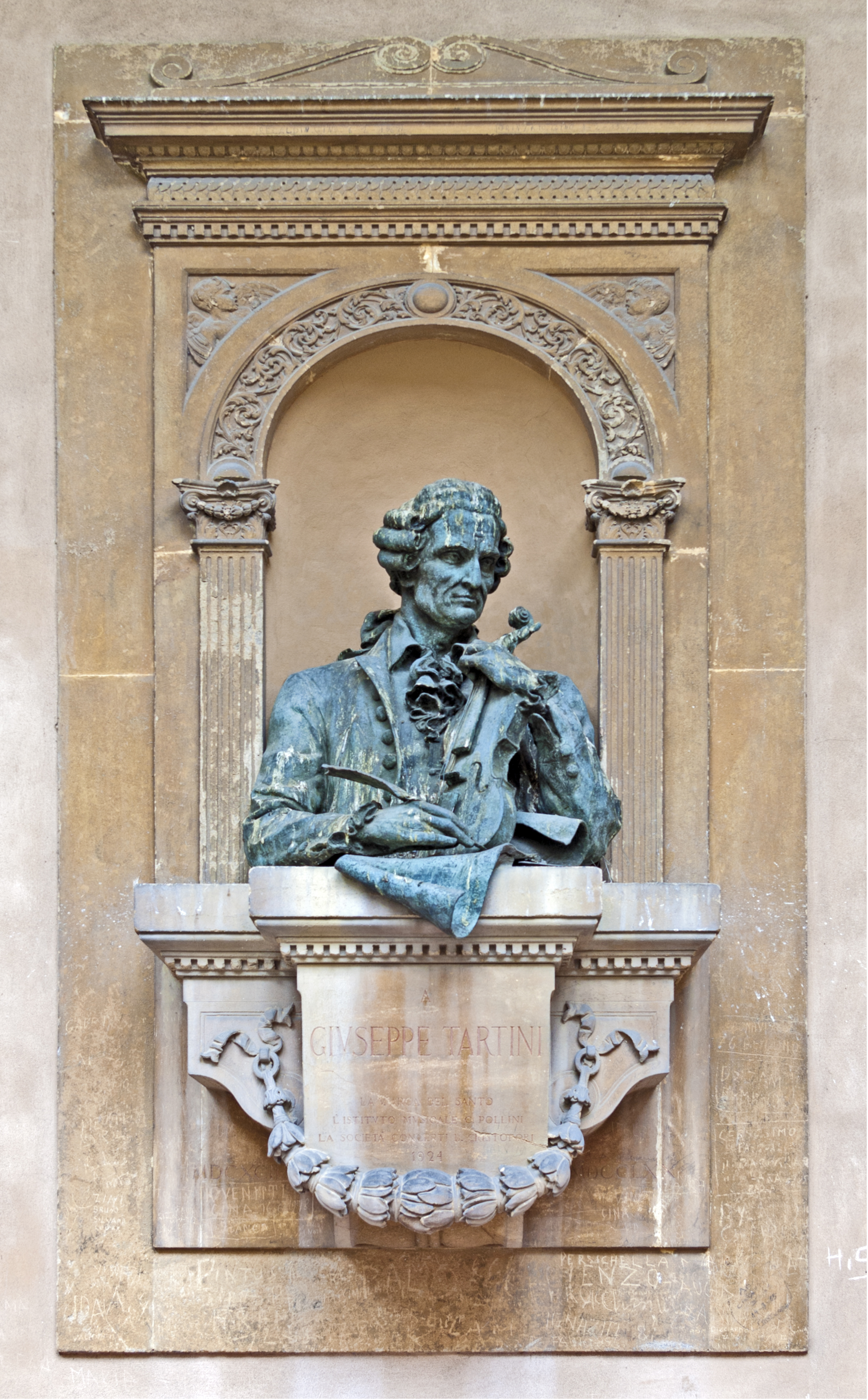
Monument in the Basilica of St Anthony in Padua

Tartini was born on 8 April 1692 in Pirano (today Piran in Slovenia), a town on the peninsula of Istria, in the Republic of Venice to Gianantonio – native of Florence – and Caterina Zangrando, a descendant of one of the oldest aristocratic Piranese families.

It appears Tartini's parents intended him to become a Franciscan friar and, in this way, he received basic musical training. Tartini studied violin first at the collegio delle Scuole Pie in Capodistria (today Koper).

He studied law at the University of Padua, where he became skilled at fencing. After his father's death in 1710, he married Elisabetta Premazore, a woman his father disapproved of because of her poverty, unknown father and greater age (she was 20, he was 18). Unfortunately, Elisabetta was a favourite of the powerful Cardinal Giorgio Cornaro, who promptly charged Tartini with abduction. Tartini fled Padua to go to the monastery of St. Francis in Assisi, where he could escape prosecution. In Assisi he studied under Bohuslav Matěj Černohorský.

== Career ==
Legend says when Tartini heard Francesco Maria Veracini's playing in 1716, he was impressed by it and dissatisfied with his own skill. He fled to Ancona and locked himself away in a room to practice, according to Charles Burney, "in order to study the use of the bow in more tranquility, and with more convenience than at Venice, as he had a place assigned him in the opera orchestra of that city".

Tartini's skill improved tremendously and, in 1721, he was appointed Maestro di Cappella at the Basilica di Sant'Antonio in Padua, with a contract that allowed him to play for other institutions if he wished. In Padua, he met and befriended fellow composer and theorist Francesco Antonio Vallotti. Between 1723 and 1725, he was in Prague, where he was master of the chapel of the Count Kinsky.

Tartini was the first known owner of a violin made by Antonio Stradivari in 1715, which Tartini bestowed upon his student Salvini, who in turn gave it to the Polish composer and virtuoso violinist Karol Lipiński upon hearing him perform: the instrument is thus known as the Lipinski Stradivarius. Tartini also owned and played the Antonio Stradivarius violin ex-Vogelweith from 1711.

In 1726, Tartini started a violin school which attracted students from all over Europe. Gradually, Tartini became more interested in the theory of harmony and acoustics and from 1750 to the end of his life he published various treatises, in which he also treated problems of music theory on a mathematical basis.

== Death ==
Tartini died of gangrene on 26 February 1770 in Padua.

== Memorials ==
Tartini's home town, Piran (now in Slovenia), has a statue of him in the square, which was the old harbour, originally Roman, named Tartini Square (Slovene: Tartinijev trg, Italian: Piazza Tartini). Silted up and obsolete, the port was cleared of debris, filled, and redeveloped. One of the old stone warehouses is now the Hotel Giuseppe Tartini.

His birthday is celebrated by a concert in the main town cathedral.

== Compositions ==
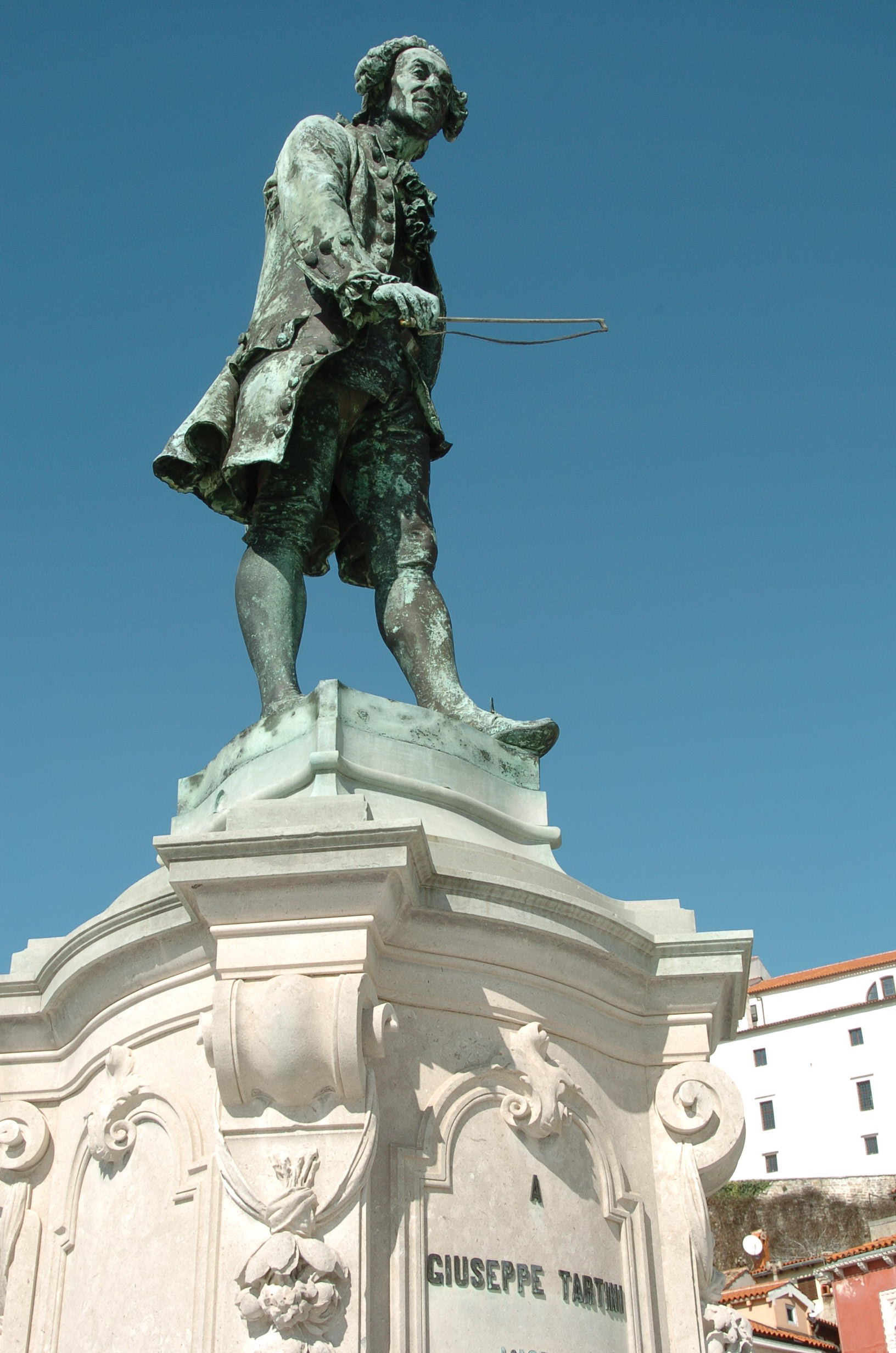
Statue of Tartini in Piran, Slovenia

Today, Tartini's most famous work is the Devil's Trill Sonata, a solo violin sonata that requires a number of technically demanding double stop trills and is difficult even by modern standards. According to a legend embroidered upon by Madame Blavatsky, Tartini was inspired to write the sonata by a dream in which the Devil appeared at the foot of his bed playing the violin.

Almost all of Tartini's works are violin concerto (at least 135) and violin sonatas (at least 100). Tartini's compositions include some sacred works such as a Miserere, composed between 1739 and 1741 at the request of Pope Clement XII, and a Stabat Mater, composed in 1769. He also composed trio sonatas and a sinfonia in A. Cataloguing Tartini's compositions is a challenge for scholars and editors. Tartini never dated his manuscripts, and revised works that had been completed or even published long before, making it difficult to determine when a work was written, when it was revised, and the extent of the revisions. The scholars Minos Dounias and Paul Brainard have attempted to divide Tartini's works into periods based entirely on the stylistic characteristics of the music.

Sixty-two manuscripts with compositions of Tartini are housed at the Biblioteca comunale Luciano Benincasa in Ancona.

Luigi Dallapiccola wrote a piece called Tartiniana based on various themes by Tartini.

== Theoretical work ==
In addition to his work as a composer, Tartini was a music theorist, of a very practical bent. He is credited with the discovery of sum and difference tones, an acoustical phenomenon of particular utility on string instruments (intonation of double-stops can be judged by careful listening to the difference tone, the "terzo suono"). He published his discoveries in a treatise "Trattato di musica secondo la vera scienza dell'armonia" (Padua, 1754). His treatise on ornamentation was eventually translated into French — though when its influence was rapidly waning, in 1771 — by a certain "P. Denis", whose introduction called it "unique"; indeed, it was the first published text devoted entirely to ornament and, though it was all but forgotten, as only the printed edition survived, has provided first-hand information on violin technique for modern historically informed performances, once it was published in English translation by Sol Babitz in 1956. Of greater assistance to such performance was Erwin Jacobi's published edition. In 1961, Jacobi published a tri-lingual edition consisting of the French (basis of the following two), English (translation by Cuthbert Girdlestone), plus Jacobi's own translation into German (Giuseppe Tartini. "Traité des agréments de la musique", trans. and ed. Erwin Jacobi. Celle: Hermann Moeck Verlag, 1961). Of significant import, Jacobi's edition also includes a facsimile of the original Italian found in Venice in 1957, copied in the hand of Giovanni Nicolai (one of Tartini's best-known students) and includes an opening section on bowing and a closing section on how to compose cadenzas not previously known. Another copy (though less complete) of the Italian original was found among manuscripts purchased by the University of California, Berkeley in 1958, a collection that also included numerous ornamented versions of slow movements of concertos and sonatas, written in Tartini's hand. Minnie Elmer analyzed these ornamented versions in her master's thesis at UC, Berkeley in 1959 (Minnie Elmer. "The Improvised Ornamentation of Giuseppe Tartini". Unpublished M.A. thesis. Berkeley, 1959).

== Publications ==
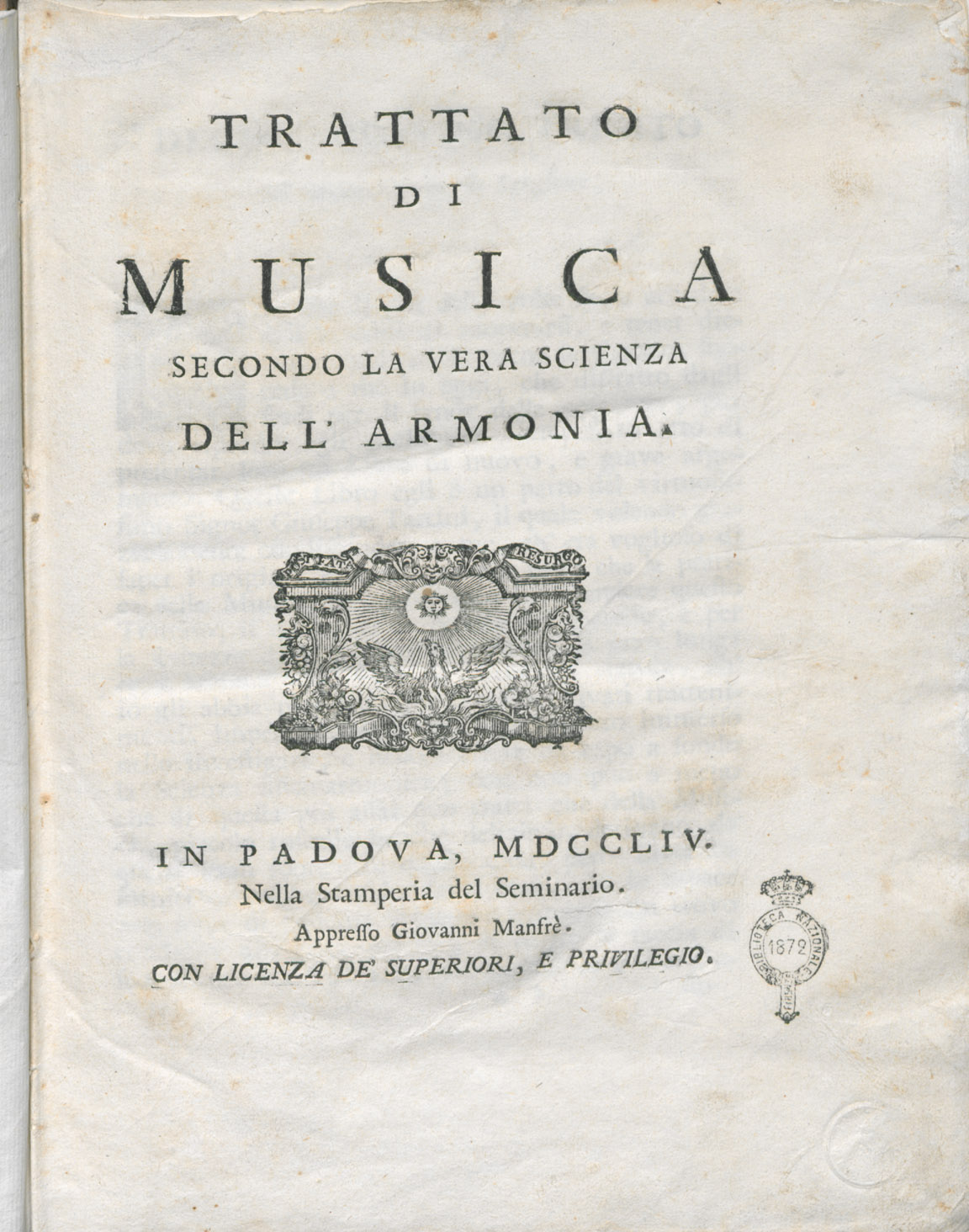
Trattato di musica secondo la vera scienza dell'armonia, 1754

- Giuseppe Tartini (1754). Trattato di musica secondo la vera scienza dell'armonia (in Italian). Padova: Giovanni Manfrè.

== Fictional portrayal ==
Tartini is mentioned in Madame Blavatsky's "The Ensouled Violin", a short story included in the collection Nightmare Tales.

Tartini, the great composer and violinist of the seventeenth [sic] century, was denounced as one who got his best inspirations from the Evil One, with whom he was, it was said, in regular league. This accusation was, of course, due to the almost magical impression he produced upon his audiences. His inspired performance on the violin secured for him in his native country the title of "Master of Nations". The Sonate du Diable, also called "Tartini's Dream" — as every one who has heard it will be ready to testify — is the most weird melody ever heard or invented: hence, the marvellous composition has become the source of endless legends. Nor were they entirely baseless, since it was he, himself; who was shown to have originated them. Tartini confessed to having written it on awakening from a dream, in which he had heard his sonata performed by Satan, for his benefit, and in consequence of a bargain made with his infernal majesty.

The folklore of the "Devil's violin", classically exemplified by a similar story told of Niccolò Paganini, is widespread; it is an instance of the deal with the devil. A modern variant is the country song The Devil Went Down to Georgia; the PBS segment on violin in its series "Art" was titled "Art of violin: the devil's instrument".

Tartini's The Devil's Trill is the signature work of a central character in Daniel Silva's The English Assassin. Anna Rolfe, the daughter of a Swiss banker, is a famous violinist and the sonata features prominently in the novel. The story of Tartini's inspirational dream is told. The story also forms the basis of the mystery novel The Devil's Trill, by violinist and author Gerald Elias, published by St. Martin's Press (2009), reissued by Level Best Books (2021), and made into an audiobook produced by Alison Larkin Presents (2017) with Elias performing the sonata.{Gerald Elias, 2026} 300914.

Tartini's The Devil's Trill is also featured in the Japanese anime Descendants of Darkness (Yami no Matsuei). The three-part story is also named after the composition.
