= Alfred A. Farland =

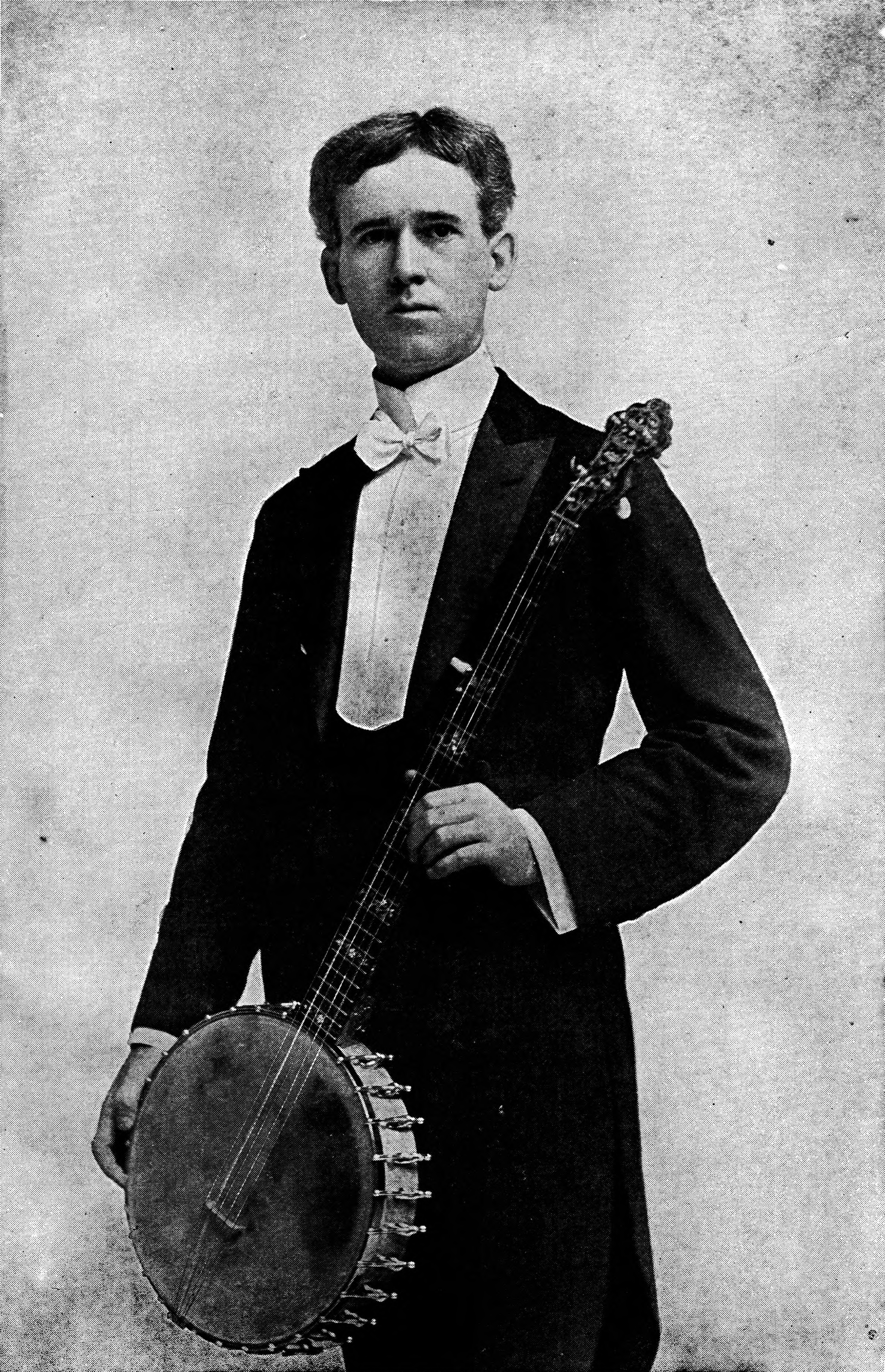
- Portrait of A. A. Farland in 1902, holding one of his Artist's Grand banjos.

Background information
- Also known as: Alfred A. Farland, A. A. Farland
- Born: Alfred Adolphus Farland; April 10, 1864; Lachine, Canada East
- Died: May 5, 1954 (aged 90) Plainfield, New Jersey, U.S.
- Genres: Parlor music, classic-banjo instrumentals, European classical
- Occupations: Musician, composer, performer, musical instrument manufacturer, music teacher
- Instrument: Banjo
- Years active: 1884–1939
- Spouse: Carrie Myers

Alfred Adolphus Farland Sr. (April 10, 1864 – May 5, 1954) was a Canadian-American banjoist, playing in the classic banjo style for more than 40 years. He played the banjo wearing a tuxedo, bringing an air of sophistication to the instrument, when the 19th-century image for a banjo player tended toward the comic, the racist and the crude. He had a reputation for entertaining "cultivated audiences" with banjo adaptations of European classical music. Farland's adaptations included Bach violin sonatas, Beethoven violin sonatas, a Mendelssohn violin sonata, Brahms dances, and some of Chopin's nocturnes and waltzes. His performances of this kind of music on the banjo were seen in 1900 as successfully "stretching the limits of the instrument."

Farland based his performances initially out of Pittsburgh, but later moved to New York, in order to be closer to potential students during his off season. He wrote a banjo method and composed music for students to practice.

Farland was also an inventor and designed his own line of banjos with wooden rims. He held patents for banjo-related inventions, including an all-metal banjo head and an adapter to produce harp-like tones from a banjo.

== Background ==
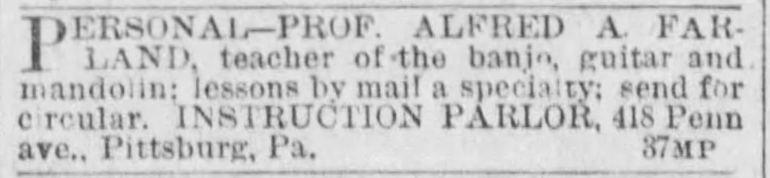
Alfred A. Farland, 1888, advertising as music teacher

Alfred A. Farland, 1891 advertisement, music teacher 14 years experience

Alfred Farland was the youngest of nine children, 5 boys and 4 girls, his parents natives of Canada. His family moved to the United States about 1865, with some members being born in the U.S. They were involved in the clothing-making industry. His father was a tailor, and Alfred and his brothers (and sometimes his sisters) worked in the woolen mills that turned sheep's wool into cloth. Although he lived and died in the United States, he remained Canadian through at least 1920, becoming a citizen by 1940.

In 1880 when he was 14 years old, Alfred Farland worked as a weaver in a woolen mill in Westerly, Rhode Island. His brother, Joseph, lived nearby and also worked in the woolen mill. About 14 years later, Alfred would receive acclaim in his music-playing profession, playing the banjo, accompanied on piano by his niece Annie, Joseph's daughter.

He began to take lessons from music teachers in about 1877, when he was 13 years old. He was good enough that five years later in 1882 he was able to work professionally, working within "concert companies." In 1888 he moved to Pittsburgh, Pennsylvania to teach, and by 1891 had taught more than 500 students.

== Professional life ==
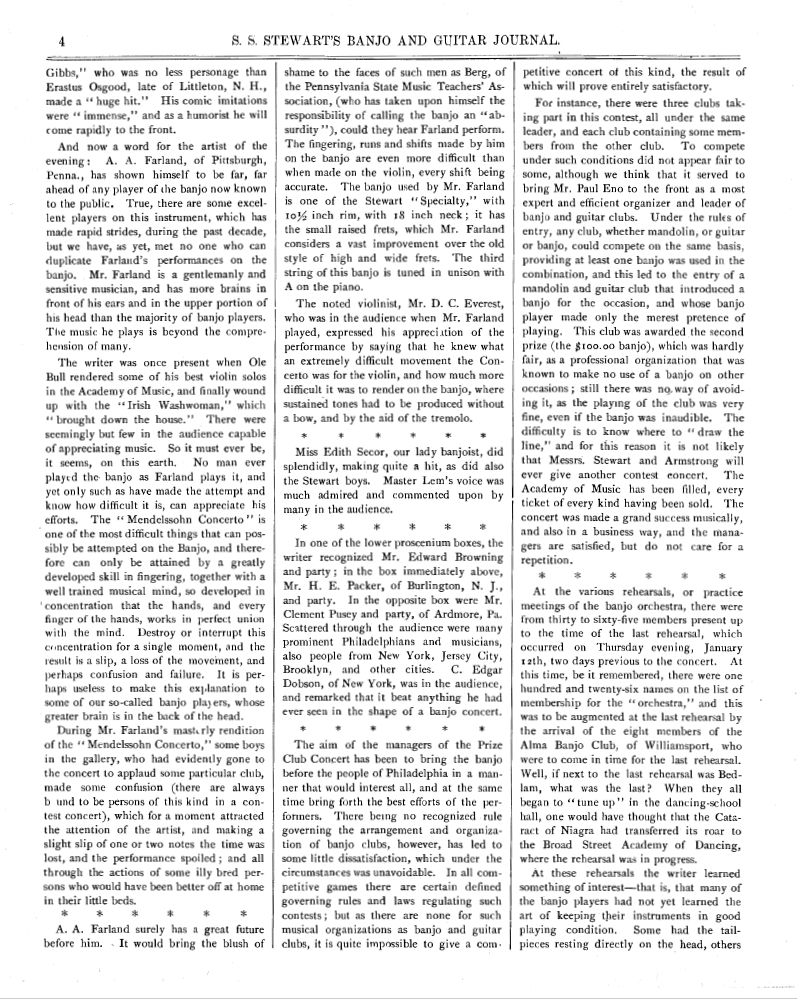
Stewart talks about Alfred A. Farland as a musician, after Farland surprised him in a contest-performance that Stewart sponsored. S. S. Stewart's Banjo and Guitar Journal, February–March 1893

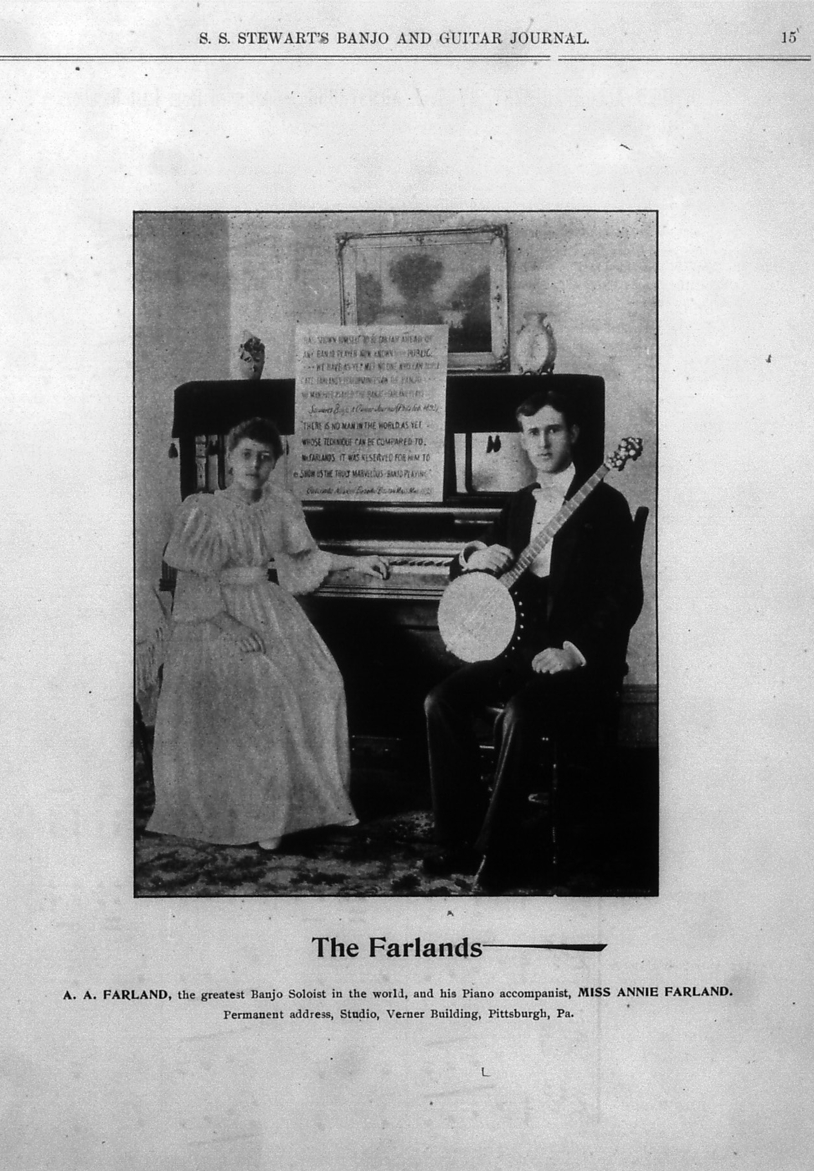
Alfred A. Farland and Annie Farland, S. S. Stewart's Banjo and Guitar Journal, October–November 1893. Annie was his niece.

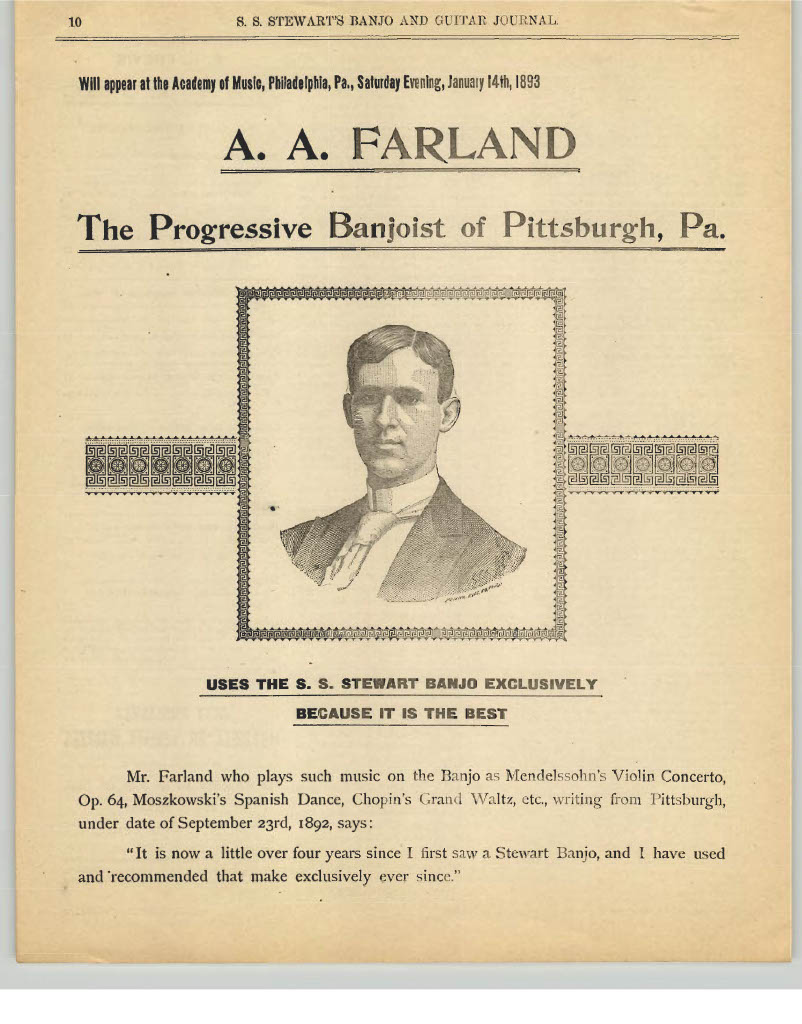
After Farland's performance in Stewart's contest, Stewart ran a full page advertisement promoting them both, in S. S. Stewart's Banjo and Guitar Journal, December 1892.

Farland entered show business in 1884, the "minstrel days", as a "blackface comedian and song and dance man." The minstrel show was a form of popular music for its day, and the banjo played a prominent role in the shows. However, the music was seen as vulgar by men such as S. S. Stewart, whom Farland would work with for years. It was music of drinking and partying, not to be listened to in the parlor. Farland didn't stick with the minstrel music, but turned to European classical. He was able to break away from the minstrel acts following a banjo concert that he gave in 1893, a contest and concert sponsored by S. S. Stewart. He impressed Stewart, who wrote, "We have, as yet, met no one who can duplicate Farland's performance on the banjo. What had really impressed Stewart was Farland's adaptation of a Mendelssohn concerto, which Stewart knew to be a difficult piece on the violin, and even more difficult on the banjo.

In embracing classical music on the banjo, he was joining men like Samuel Swaim Stewart, William A. Huntley and George W. Gregory, all of whom embraced playing the banjo on the stage, separating it from the minstrel-show repertoire. After a career in blackface, Huntley broke ground by performing in "whiteface" on the stage in 1884, eliciting the newspaper comment, "Mr. Wm. A. Huntley is the only banjo artist in the country that has ever made a success in white face." Early in his career, Stewart had included lessons for performing in blackface, but it was a small part of his larger business and magazine, both centered around a refined banjo image. Gregory was the son of the president of a philharmonic society and had applied his classical-music knowledge to the banjo, beginning about 1892.

Farland would become prominent in S. S. Stewart's Banjo and Guitar Journal, and his repertoire focused on arrangements of European classical music (then contemporary music coming out of Europe) and a high level of technical skill. His performances would inspire newspapers to label him "virtuoso." Playing until he was about 70 years old, he would "average more than 100 banjo recitals per season for more than 40 years," playing across the United States and in England.

== Classical-music artist ==
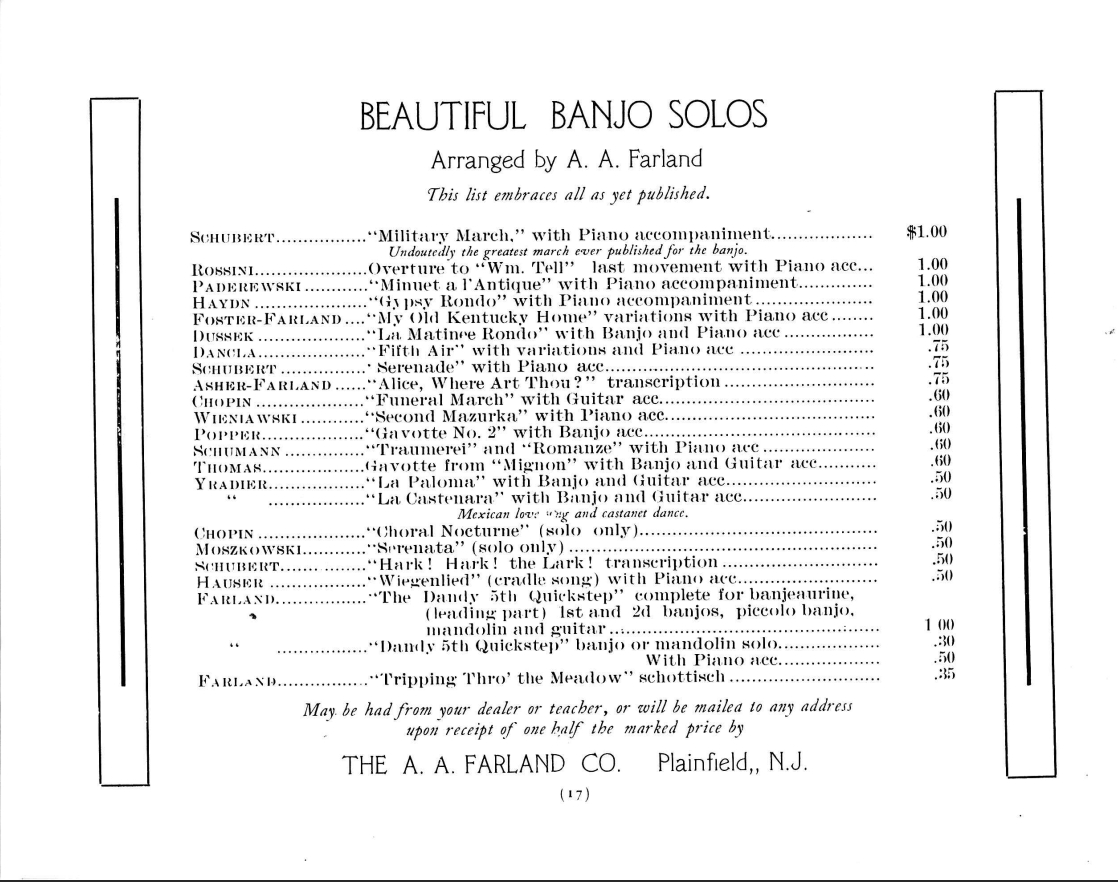
A. A. Farland's published compositions and arrangements, 1902.

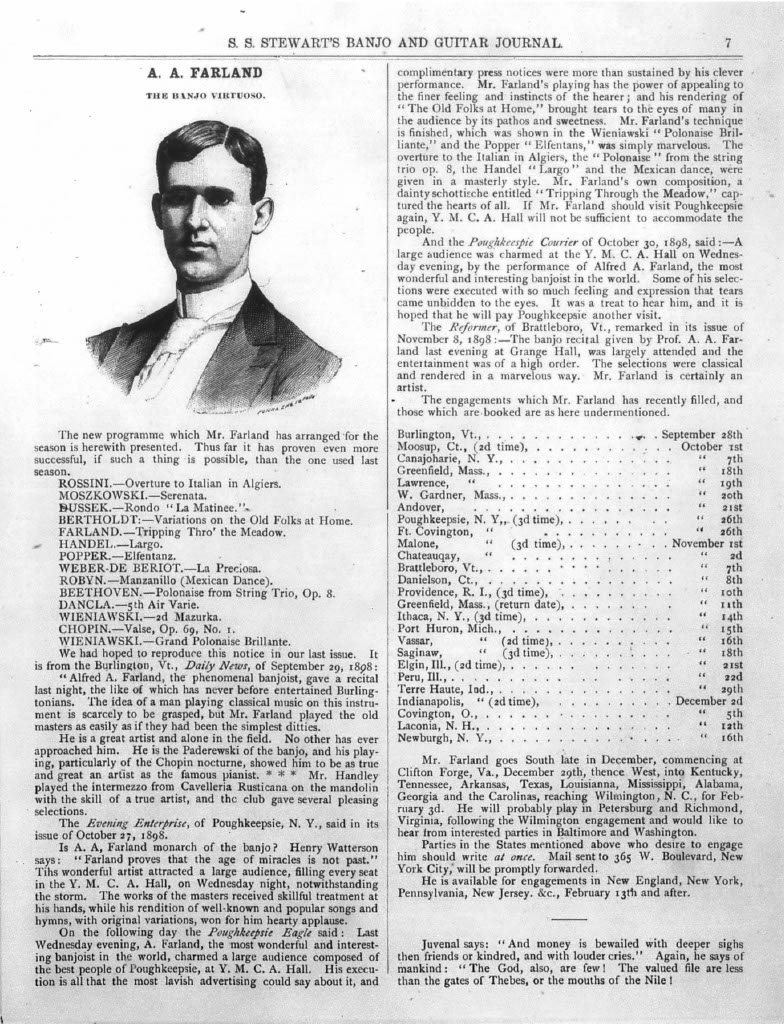
Description of Alfred A. Farland's 1898 concert season, from S. S. Stewart's Banjo and Guitar Journal, December 1898.

Farland adapted works by European composers to the banjo and played them across the United States.

Examples cited at concerts during the summer of 1894 include the "Miserere" from Verdi's Il trovatore, Mendelssohn's Violin Concerto, Op. 64, Rossini's Overture to William Tell, Beethoven's sonatas and concertos including Sonata No. 30.

Other works played in 1894 included: Beethoven 8th Sonata; Handel "Largo"; Chopin Polonaise, Op. 40, No. 1, Nocturne, Op. 9, No. 2, Valse, Op. 64, No. 2; Moszkowski Spanish Dances, Nos.1, 2 and 3, Sonata; Schubert, Serenade; Bach, Sixth Sonata, Preludio, Minuet, Gigue; Wieniawski Second Polonaise Brilliant; Paderewski Minuet a l'Antique; Haydn Gypsy Rondo; and Mendelssohn, A Midsummer Night's Dream incidental music, Op. 61: Allegro Molto Vivace.

He also played some contemporary or folk music, including Home, Sweet Home.

== Marketing with his name ==
Stewart and Farland, supporting one another

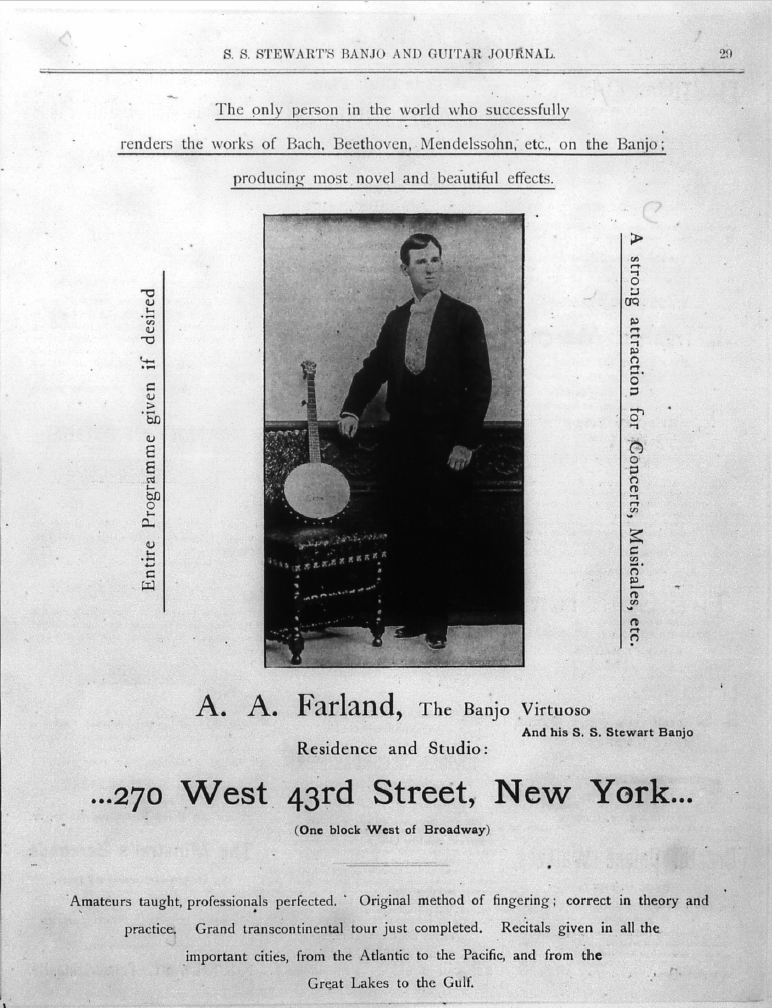
S. S. Stewart promotes Alfred A. Farland, February 1895 in S.S. Stewart's Banjo and Guitar Journal.

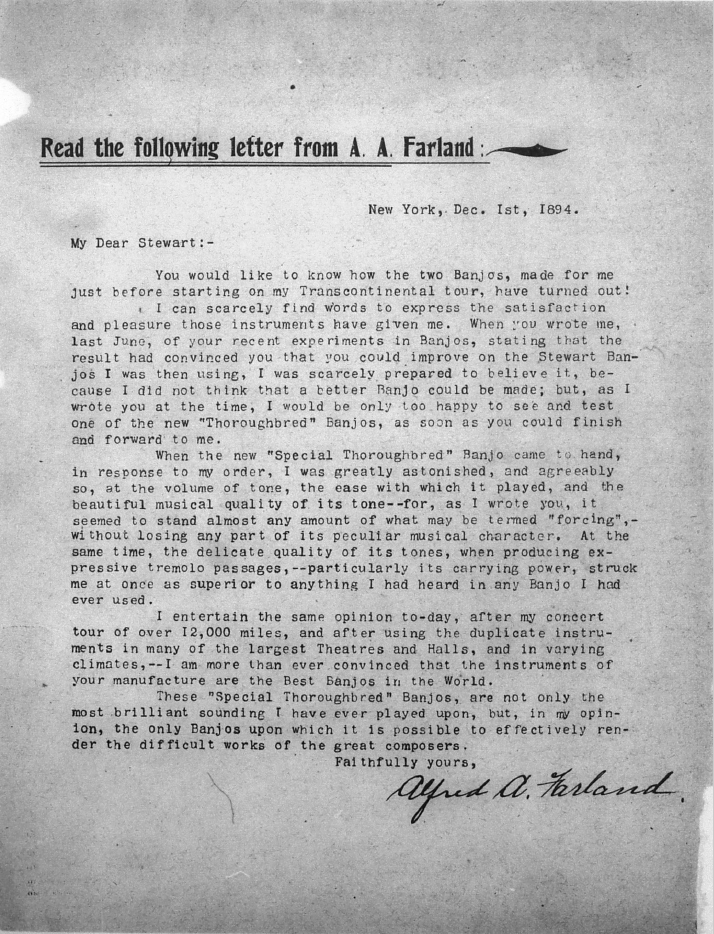
On the final page of that journal, Alfred A. Farland endorses S. S. Stewart's Thoroughbred banjo.

Farland had a business relationship with S. S. Stewart, endorsing Stewart's banjos and appearing in photographs in Stewart's Guitar and Banjo Journal holding Stewart's banjos. For about 10 years, Farland toured the United States, traveling as much as 1000 miles in a day and playing classical music on one of Stewart's banjos. He played Steward's Thoroughbred banjos, instruments which were hand-picked at the factory for their superior sound. Some of Farland's audience was aware of the elite instrument, commenting on it in a letter to Stewart, which was published in his journal.

Stewart in turn endorsed Farland in his journal, printing excerpts and whole pages about him, as well as Farland's concert schedule and upcoming concerts.

Stewart died in 1898, and by 1902, Farland moved on, creating his own banjo and founding the A. A. Farland Company of Plainfield, New Jersey, to market his instruments and publish music. He had his instruments made by such companies as Rettburg & Lange.

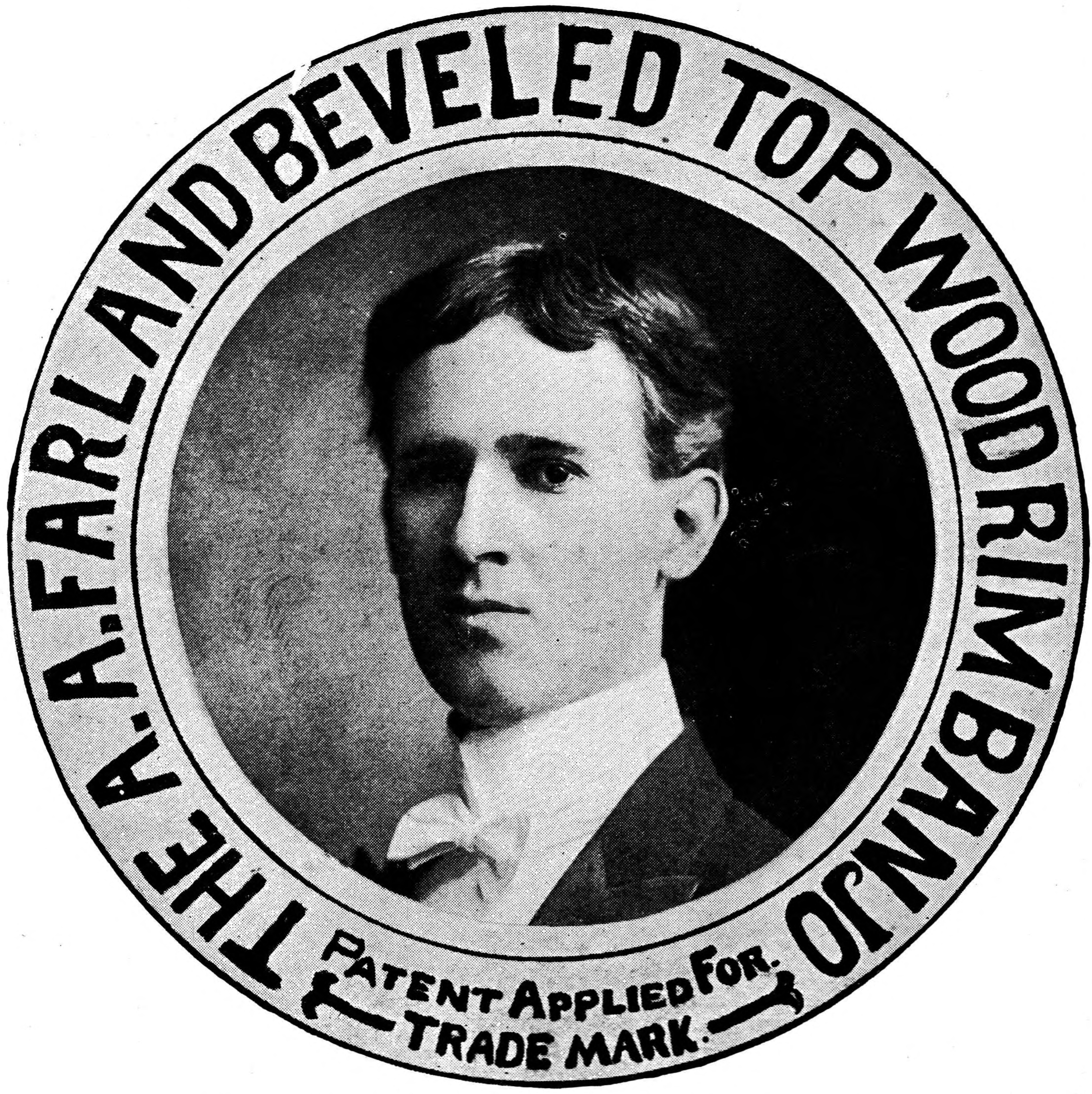
Farland marketing his own banjo line.

In creating his own banjo, he said that he was looking for a particular tone, one that was "mellow." Unlike Stewart, who idealized banjos with wooden rims covered with German silver as having the ideal banjo sound, Farland expressed that banjos sounded better with no metal in the rims at all. In his 1902 catalog, he pointed out that the majority of metal banjo rims did not fit perfectly against the wood that lined them, and that the fit would change over time. He said further that a wood-only rim increased resonance and volume, and eliminated the "hard metallic quality" of sound produced on a banjo rimmed with metal.

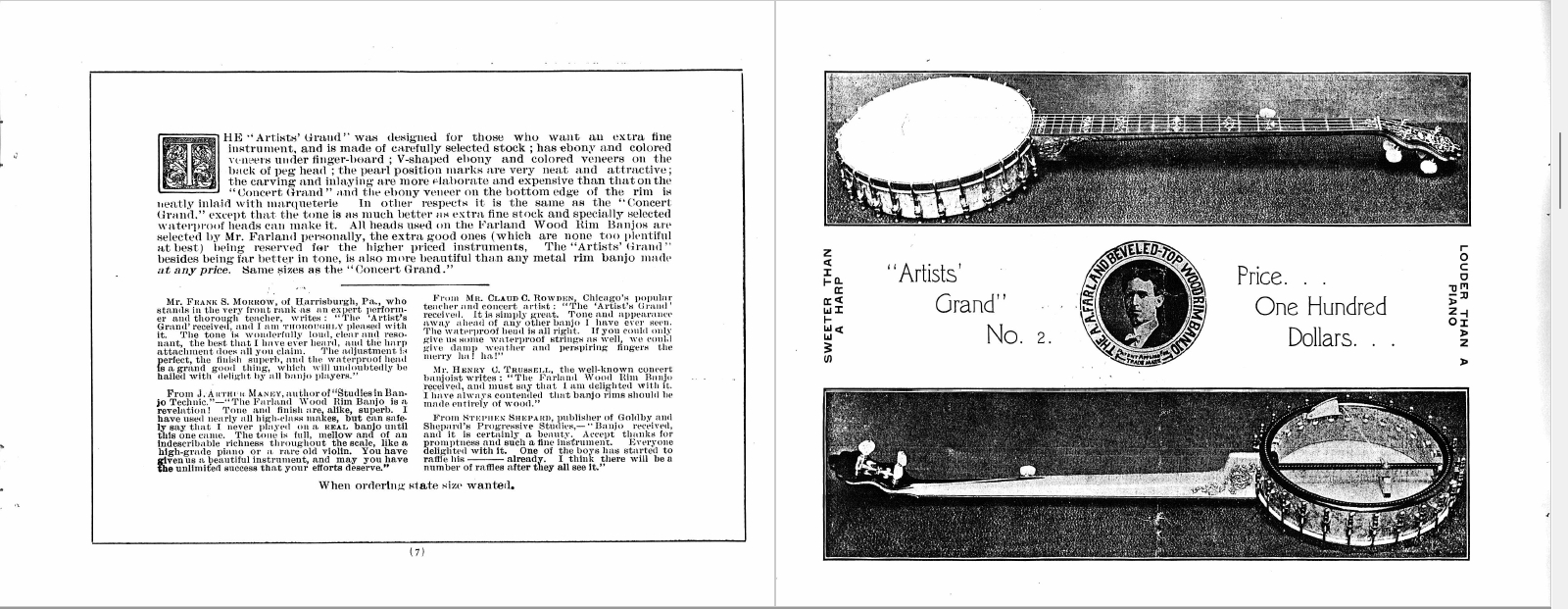
A A Farland Artists Grand No 2 from A. A. Farland 1902 catalog

His 1902 catalog included a Concert Grand banjo for $50, Artist's Grand for $75, Artist's Grand No. 2 (more ornate) for $100, Baby Grand for $35, Black Beauty and Black Baby for $30. He also marketed banjo cases, strings, tail pieces, bridges and a "harp attachment". The latter changed the banjo's tone to be more harp-like. He also offered variations of finish for the Baby Grand which made it as expensive as the Artist's Grand series.

While he and Stewart differed on what made the perfect banjo, both were part of a movement to "elevate" the banjo with European music, and both had a program of educating the public to read sheet music to play on the banjo.

Farland's method was called the National School for Banjo, and he composed music for the method to instruct students. He also felt that advanced players and professionals would benefit from the books and find the music useful.

While Farland played classical music, other classic style banjo players stayed away from classical music. Fred Van Eps and Vess Ossman disagreed with Farland's repertoire; they shied away from Farland's classical music emphasis, because the music lacked "proper banjo-like rhythm."

== American Banjo Fraternity ==
Farland was a member of the American Banjo Fraternity and its first vice president. The organization promotes and preserves knowledge of the classic banjo style of playing that Farland used.

== Works ==
Carnival of Venice, variations on the folk song composed by Julius Benedict, arranged for banjo and played on banjo by Alfred A. Farland. This song is an example of Farland using tremolo to get long notes from the instrument (much as the cornet or violin can naturally play.)

Carnival of Venice, variations on the folk song composed by Julius Benedict, arranged/played on violin by Jan Rudenyi.

Carnival of Venice - played by Herbert L. Clarke on cornet, solo with orchestra - arranged by Arban

=== Educational ===
- National School for the Banjo

=== Sheet music ===
- 1891 National Parade March
- 1892 Aldred A Farland, Tripping Through the Meadow
- 1895 Haydn, Gypsy Rondo Arranged by Alfred A.Farland.
- 1895 Menuet A L'antique
- 1895 Serenade
- 1897 My Old Kentucky Home Varied With Piano
- 1902 5th Air Varied Op. 89 No. 5
- 1902 La Castenara (Mexican Love Song, Castenet Dance)
- La Matinee Rondo
- 1902 La Paloma
- 1902 Overture To William Tell (Last Movement)
- 1902 Traumerei Op. 15 No. 7

== Gallery ==
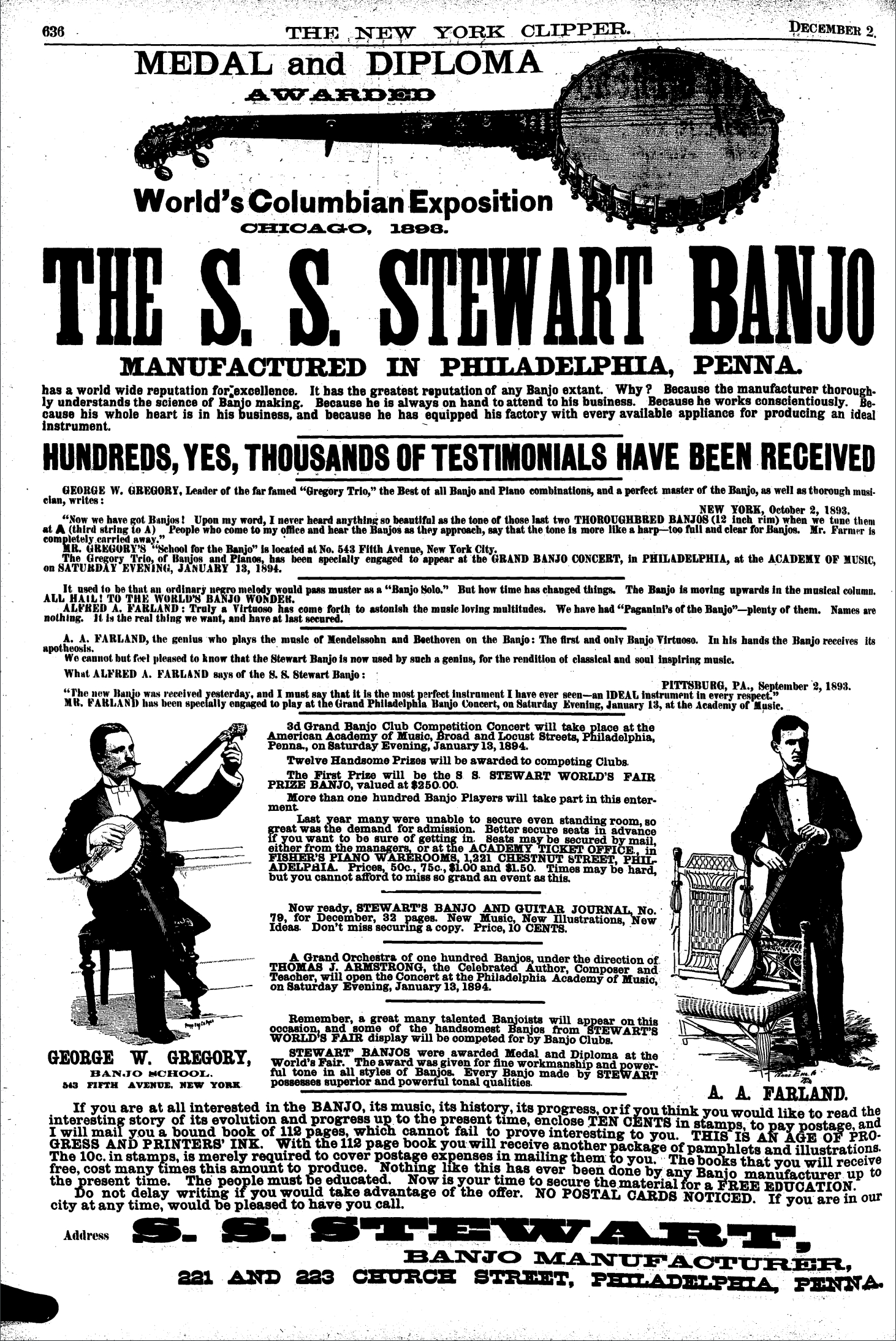
Alfred A Farland and George W Gregory in a full-page advertisement in the New York Clipper by S. S. Stewart, 2 Dec 1893

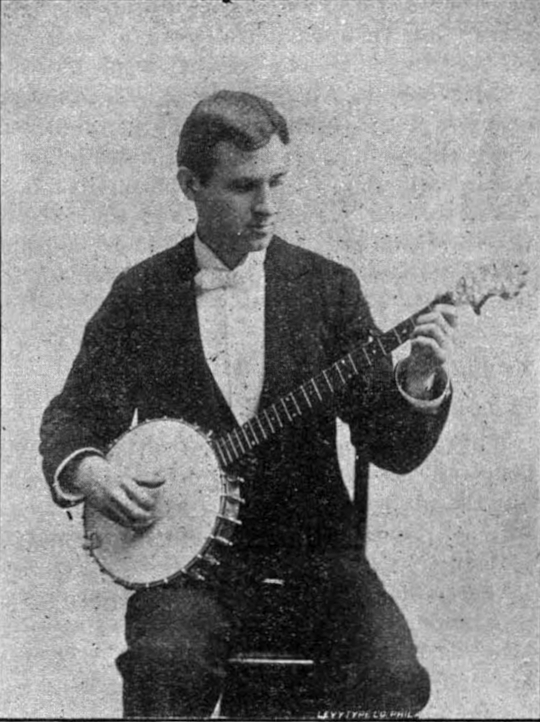
Alfred A. Farland, banjoist, 1894, from S. S. Stewarts's Banjo and Guitar Journal, June and July 1894.

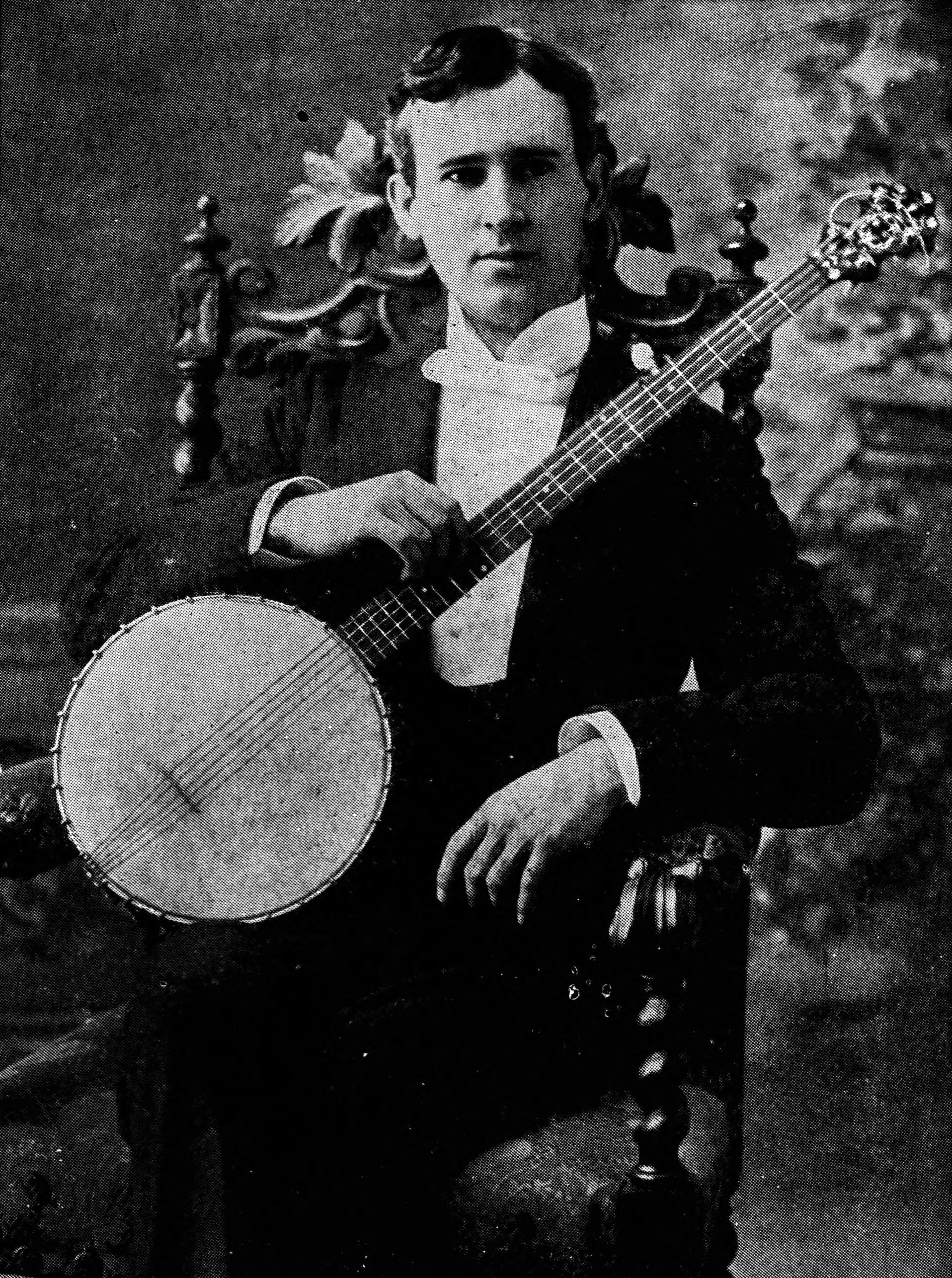
Portrait of A. A. Farland from Menuet A L'antique sheet music, 1895. According to contemporary source, Farland played an S.S. Stewart Thoroughbred.

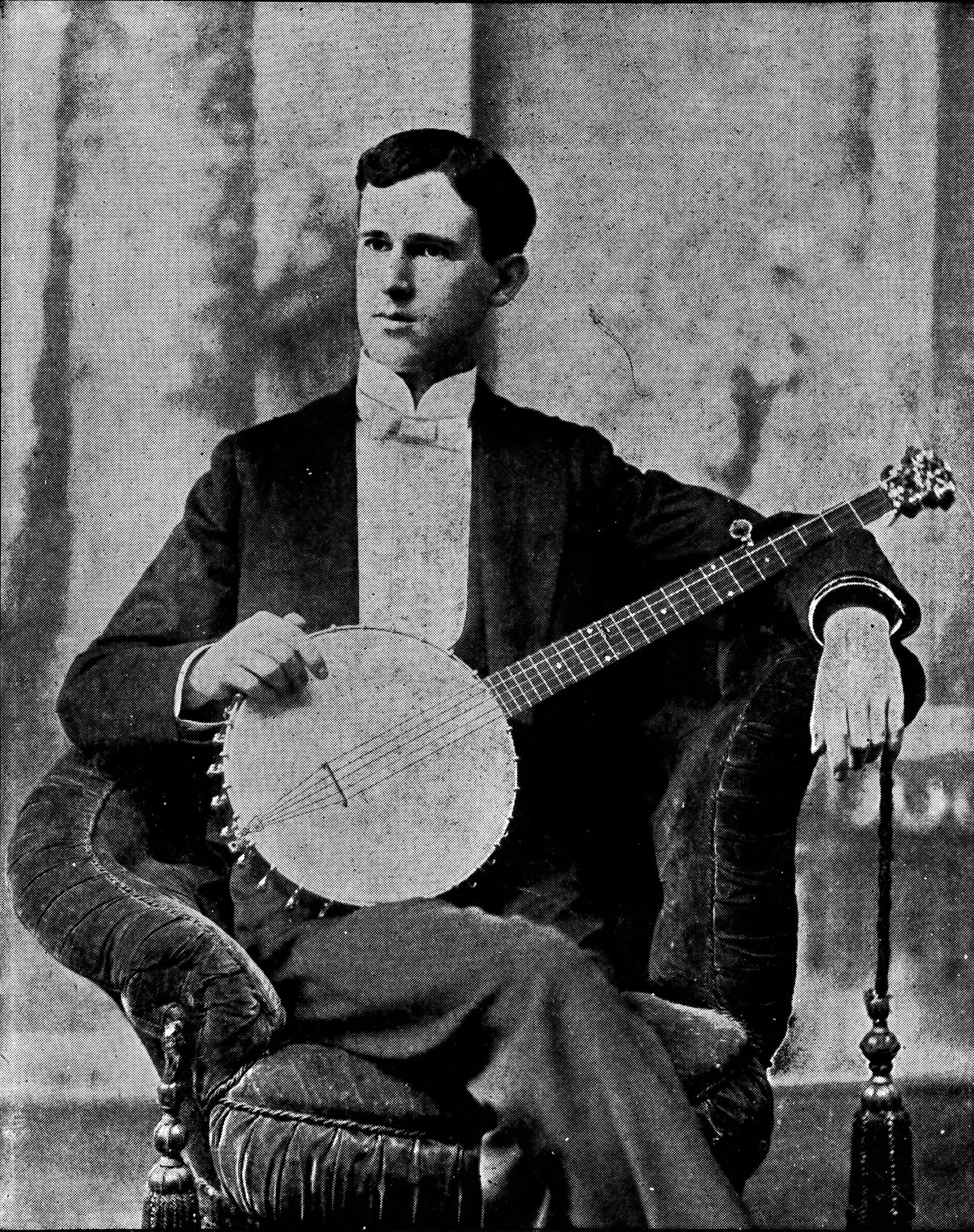
Portrait of A. A. Farland from Menuet A L'antique sheet Banjo, 1895. S.S. Stewart banjo.

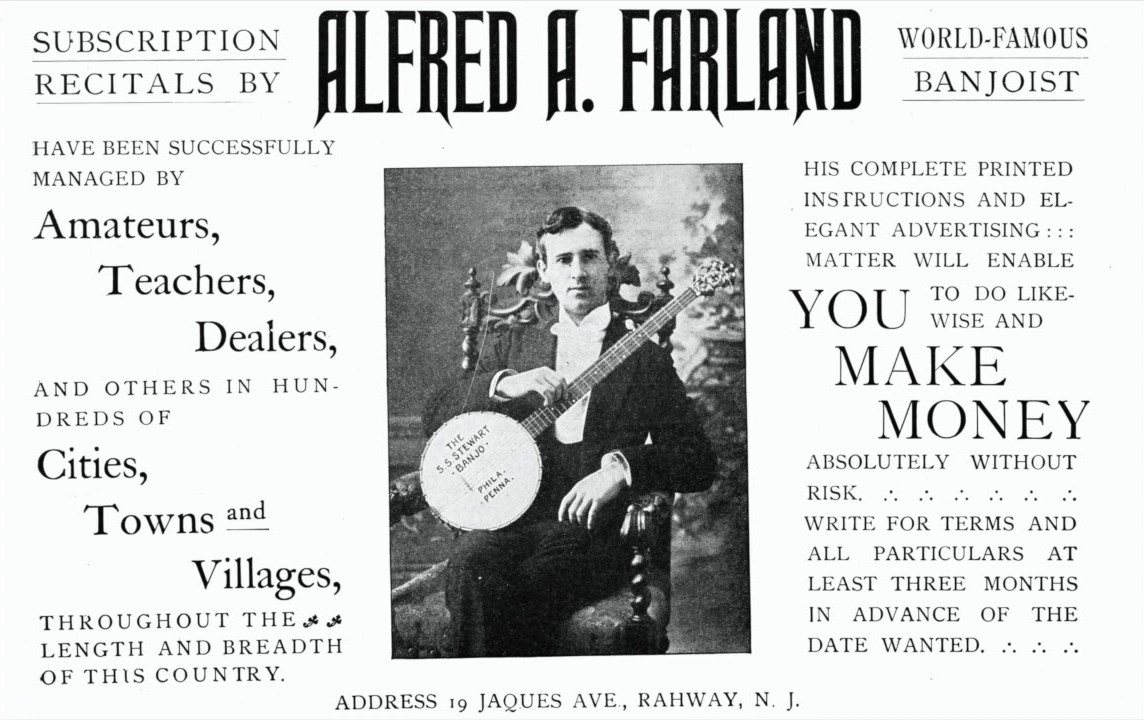
Alfred A. Farland advertisement August 1900, from S. S. Stewarts Banjo, Guitar and Mandolin Journal, August 1900.

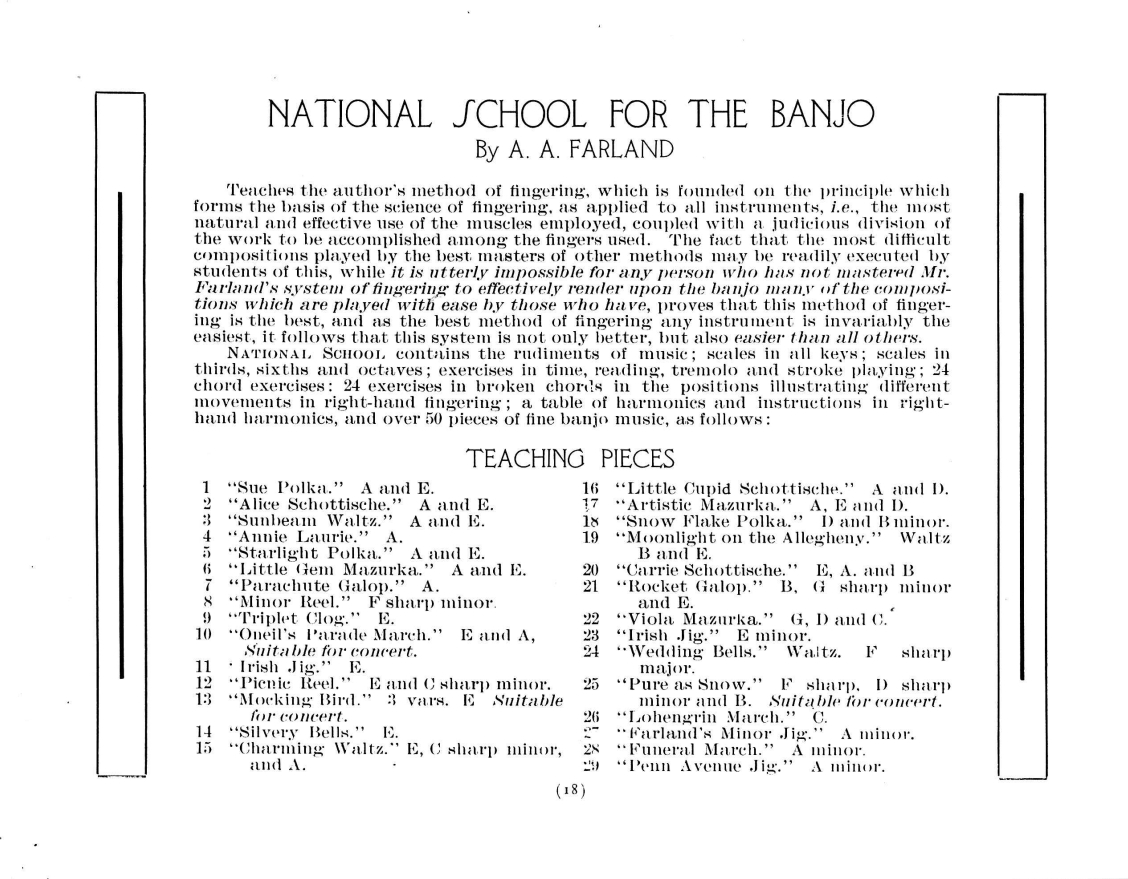
Compositions in A. A. Farland National School for the Banjo

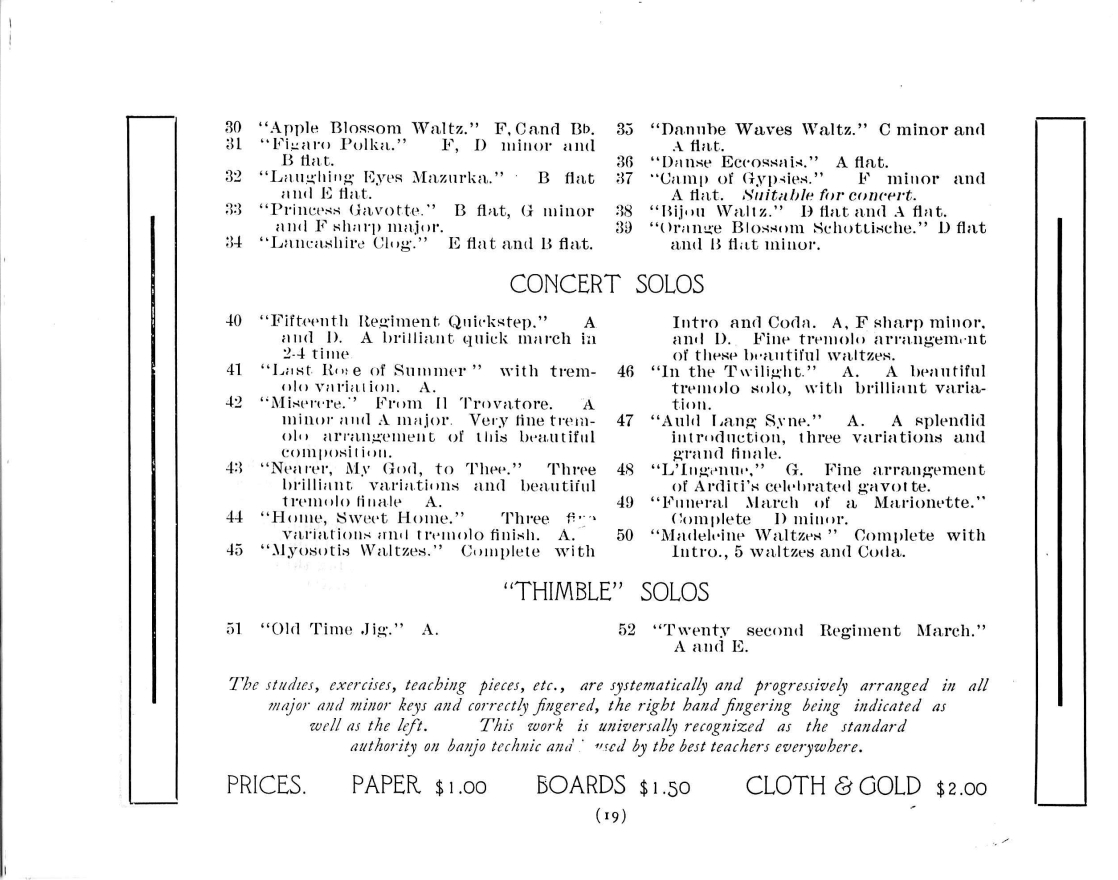
Compositions in A. A. Farland National School for the Banjo

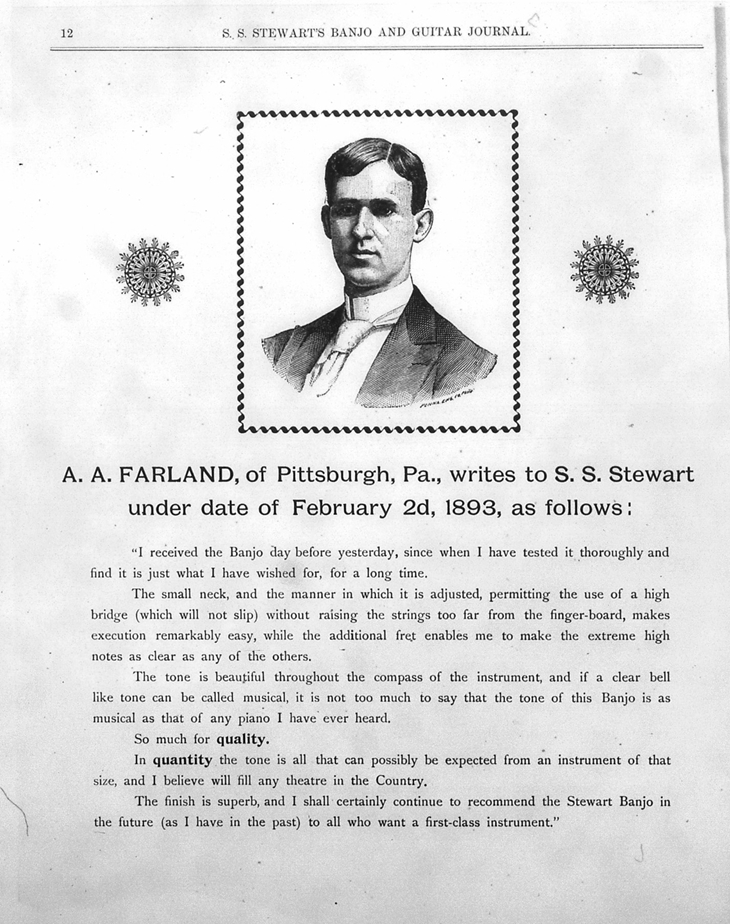
Alfred A Farland endorses SS Stewart banjos, April 1893.

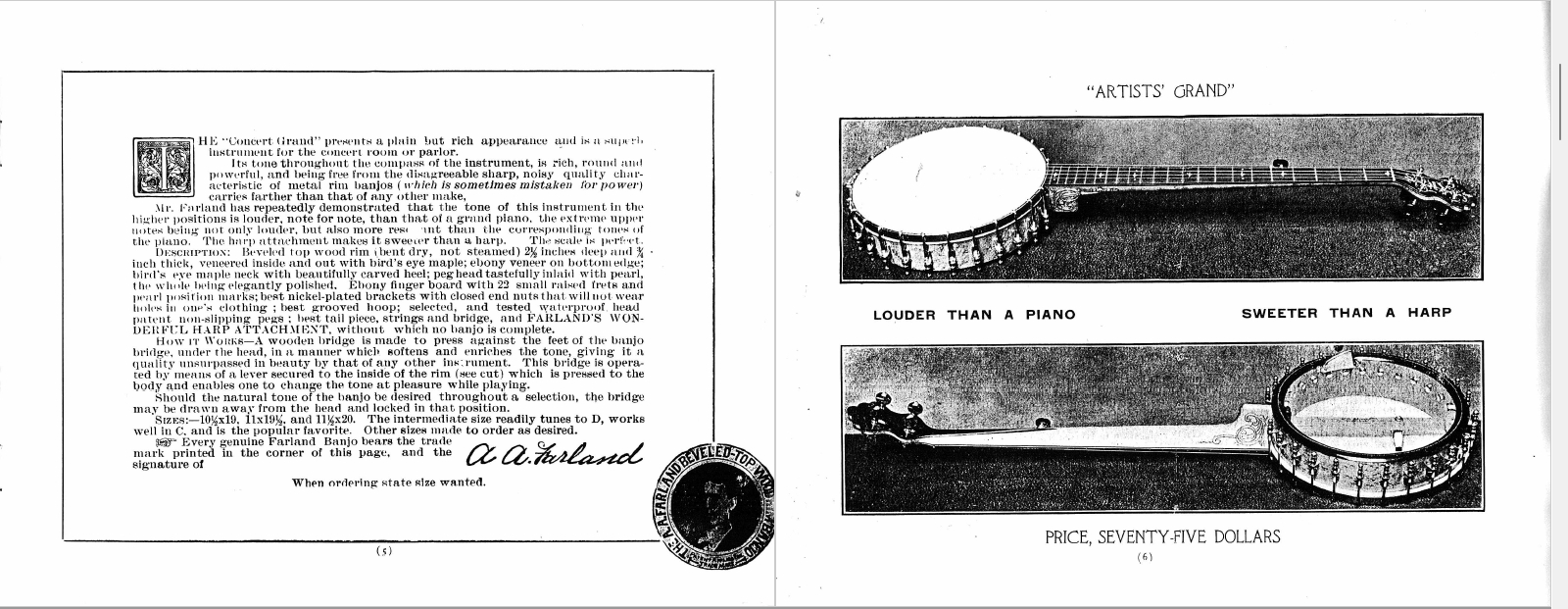
A A Farland Artists Grand from A. A. Farland 1902 catalog

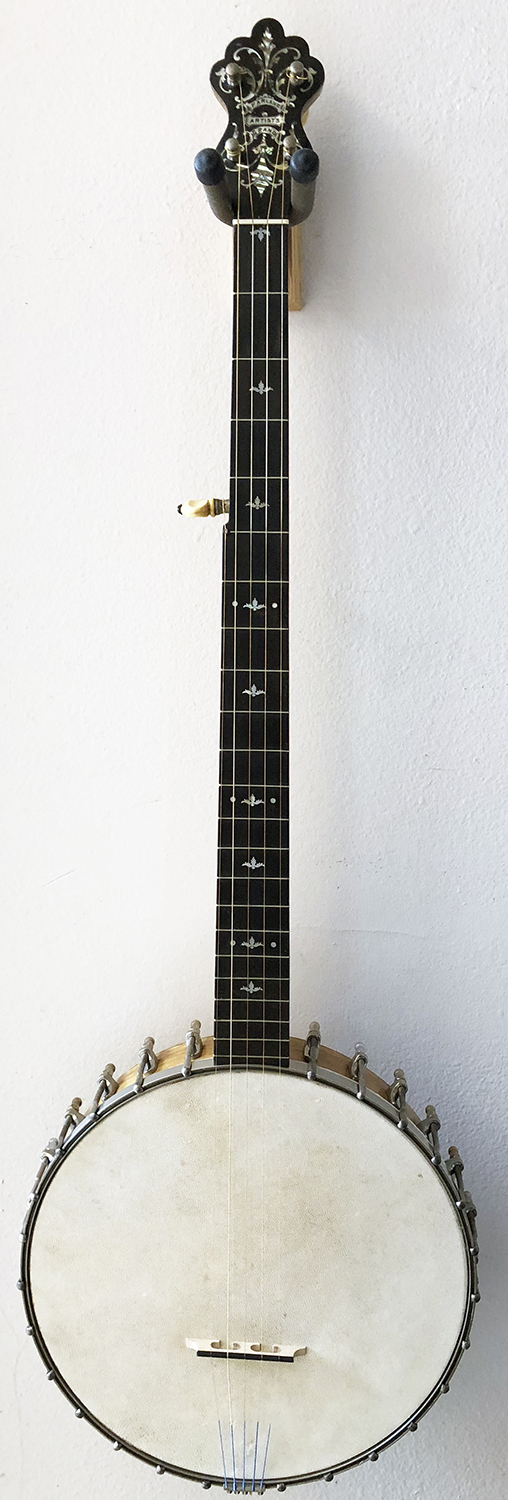
An A. A. Farland Artist's Grand banjo, in the collection of Rives McDow.

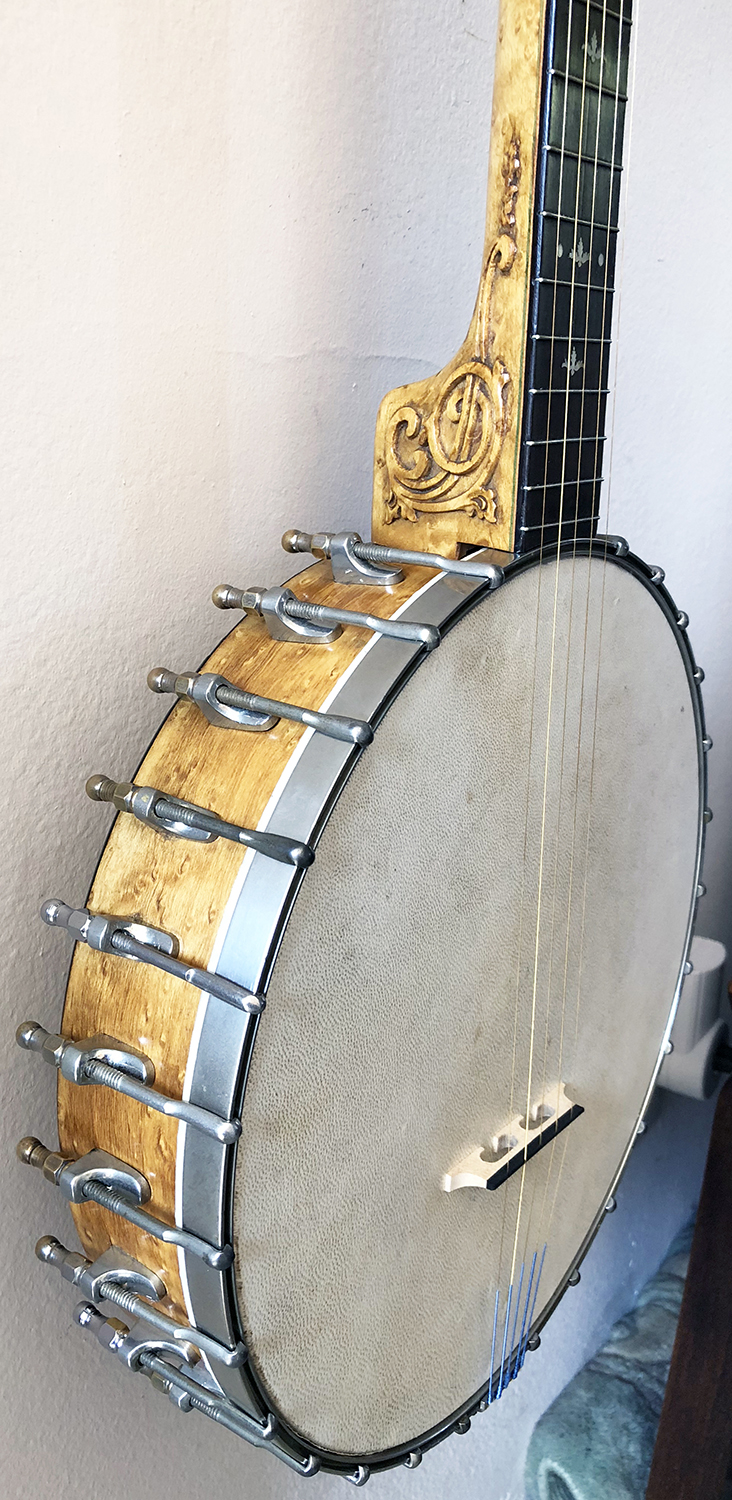
Side view of A. A. Farland Artist's Grand banjo. The rim of the body is wood; the mechanisms to stretch the soundboard are metal. The neck on this model was decorated with carving.

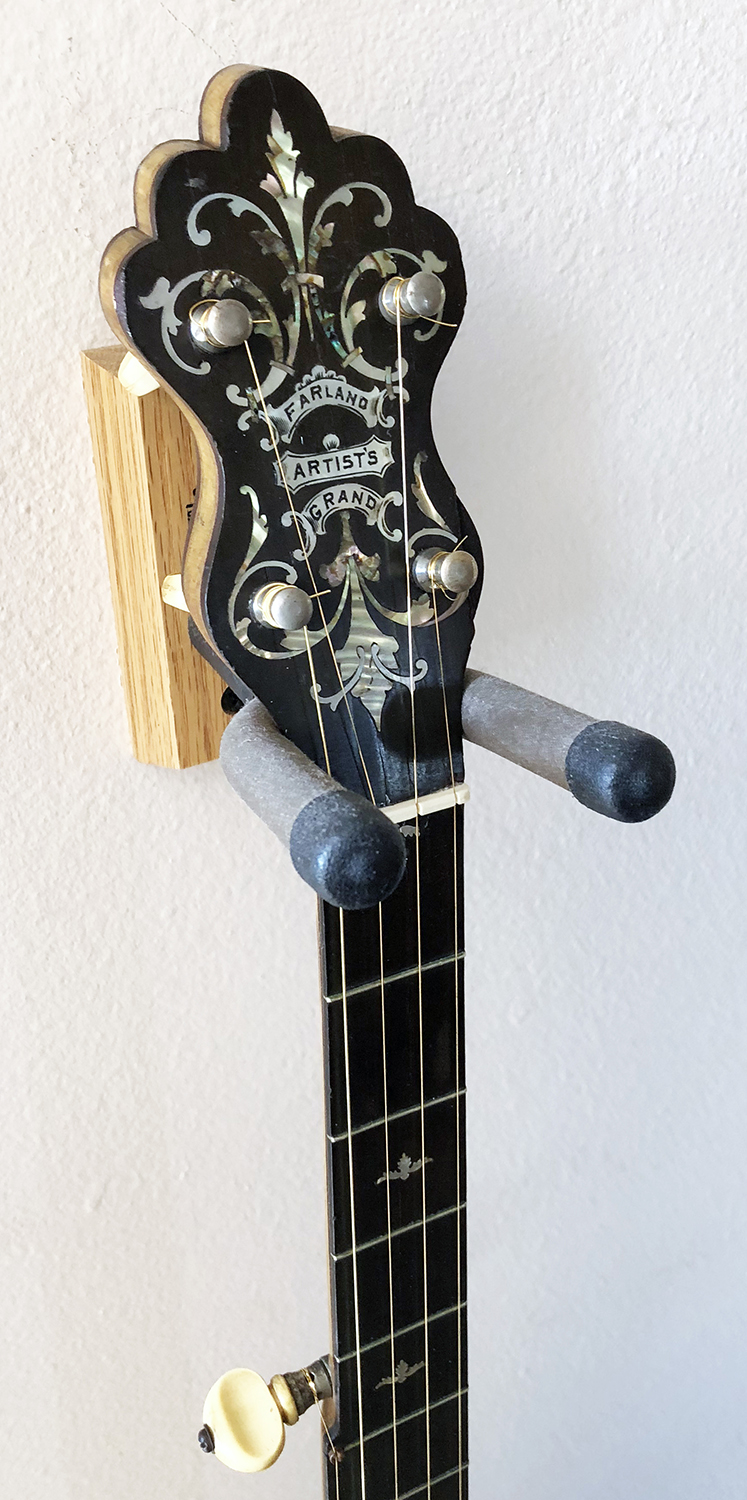
Peghead on A. A. Farland Artist's Grand banjo.

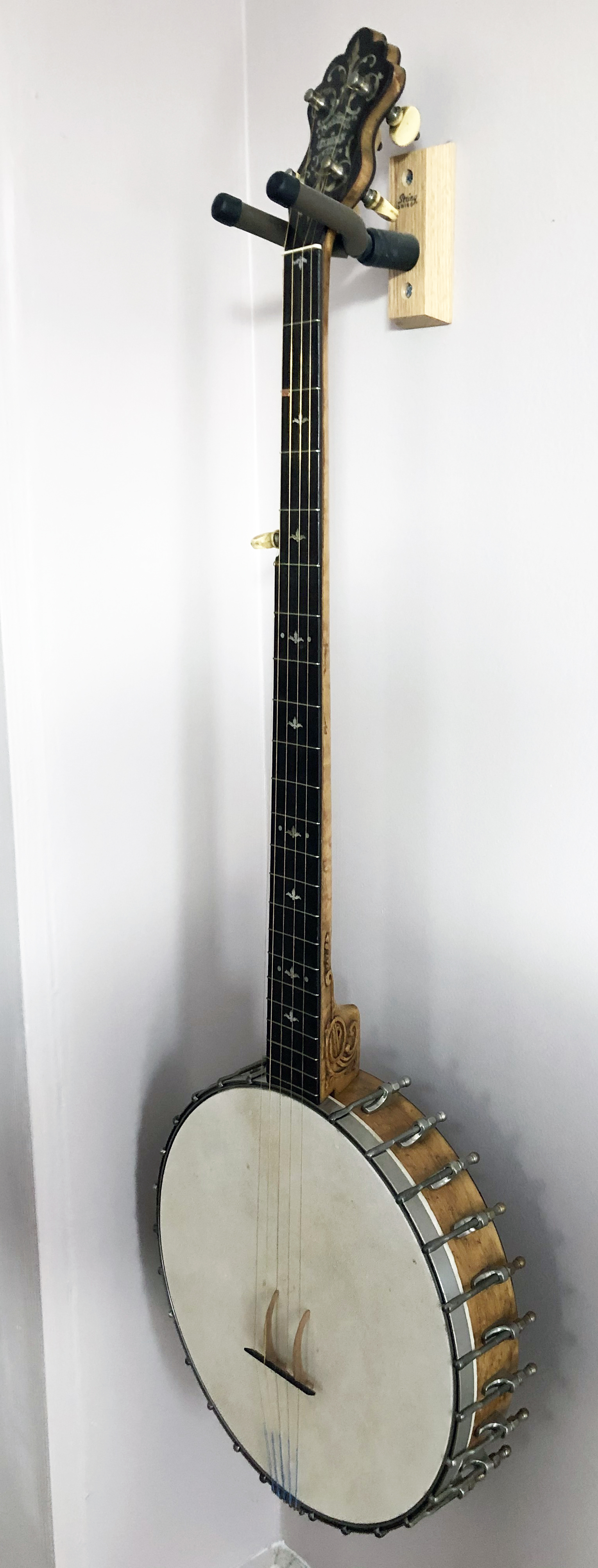
An A. A. Farland banjo, in the collection of Rives McDow

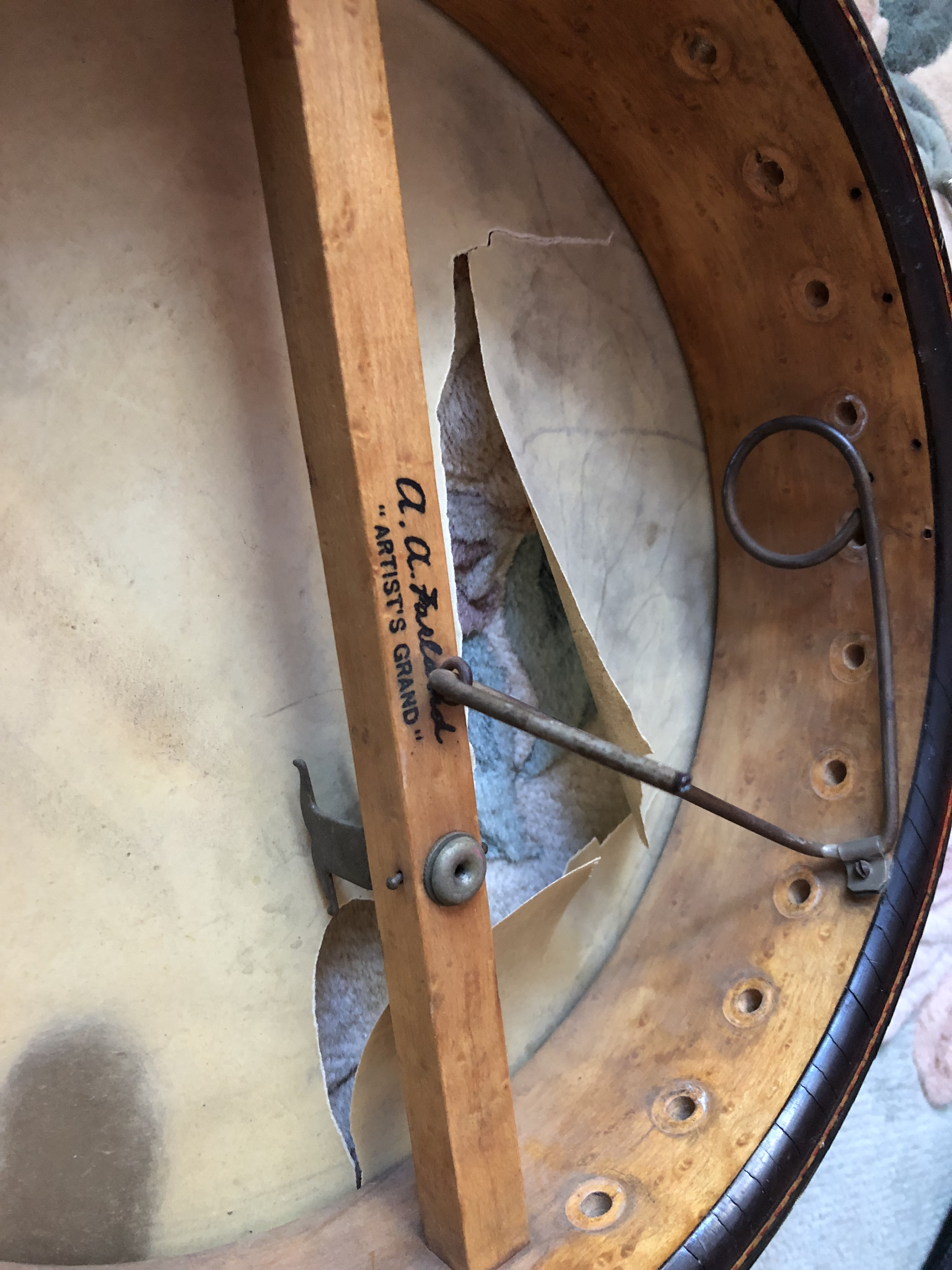
Mute mechanism of A. A. Farland banjo.

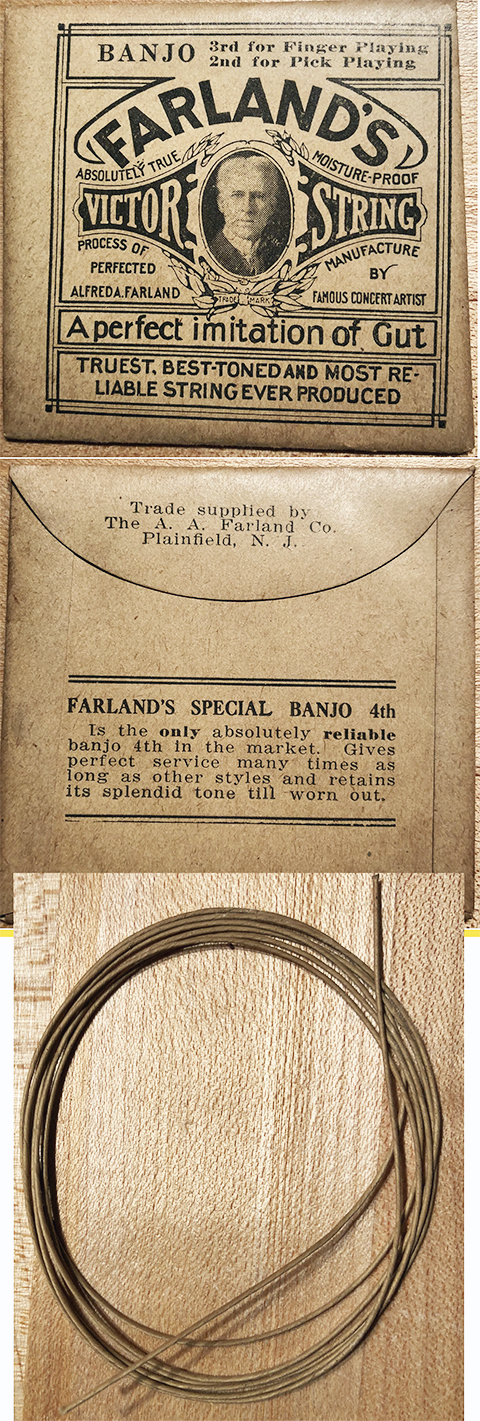
A. A. Farland Banjo strings. These were synthetic, made to simulate the gut-string sound without being as sensitive to humidity and temperature.

== Examples in S.S. Stewart's Banjo and Guitar Journal ==
The following are examples from S. S. Stewart's Banjo and Guitar Journal in which Stewart promoted Farland by publishing advertisements, concert schedules, letters from the banjo world about performances, and in which Farland promoted Stewart's banjos with photographs, publicity on the road, and written statements about his use of Stewart's instruments exclusively. This sampling of articles represents a one-year period, about 4 years before Stewart's death in 1898.

- 1894, Feb-March, inside cover, Grand Musical Triumph
- 1894, Feb-March, page 6, Farland and his banjo.
- 1894, Feb-March, page 9, Excellent Performance.
- 1894, April–May, page 1, Alfred A. Farland
- 1894, April–May, page 8, untitled.
- 1894, April–May, page 25, To whom it may concern.
- 1894, April–May, page 28, Alfred A. Farland.
- 1894, June–July, pages 5–7
- 1894 June–July, pages 10–12, The Banjo World.
- 1894 June–July, page 13, Correspondent's column.
- 1894, August–September, page 6, Teachers, Attention!.
- 1894, August–September, page 8, Take the elevator.
- 1894, August–September, page 11, The Banjo World.
- 1894 August–September, page 13, untitled.
- 1894 August–September, pages 13–14, Farland and his banjo.
- 1894 October–November, page 12, Progress.
- 1894 October–November, page 13, The Banjo World.
- 1894 October–November, page 15, Alfred A. Farland the marvelous banjo artist.
- 1894 October–November, page 34, To whom it may concern.
- 1894 December-1895 January, pages 5–7, A. A. FARLAND The Banjo Virtuoso.
- 1894 December-1895 January, page 11, The Banjo World.
- 1895 February–March, pages 1–2, The Progressive Banjoist.
- 1895 February–March, page 4, A violinist on Farland.
- 1895 February–March, page 4, Farland concerts.
