= Lipinski Stradivarius =

Antique violin

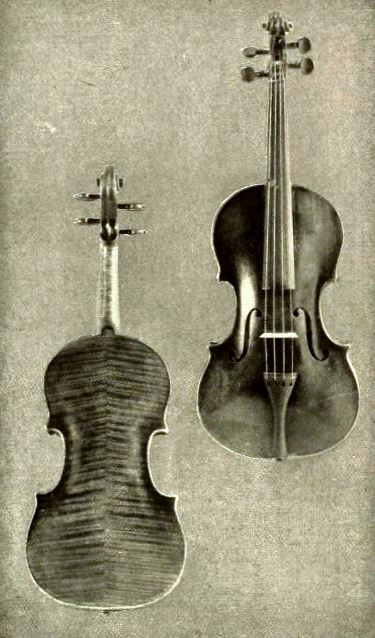
The Lipinski Stradivarius, from a 1923 magazine

The Lipinski Stradivarius is an antique violin constructed in 1715 by the Italian luthier Antonio Stradivari of Cremona, during Stradivari's "golden period" between 1700 and 1725. There are fewer than 650 extant Stradivarius violins in the world today, and the Lipinski is considered to be a particularly fine example. In 2012, it was appraised at US$5 million.

== History ==
The earlier history of The Lipinski is unclear; Italian violinist and composer Giuseppe Tartini is the first reputed owner. Tartini, who in 1713 experienced a dream in which he allowed the devil to play his violin, heard a beautiful sonata which he was unable to compare with anything he had ever heard. Tartini, two years later, tried to reproduce the sound in his Devil's Trill Sonata.

=== Lipinski ===
Tartini presented the violin to his pupil, Signor Salvini. According to a reminiscence of a certain von Krockow, who met the Polish violinist Karol Lipiński in Dresden in 1849, the young Lipinski, provided with a letter of recommendation from Louis Spohr, met Salvini in Milan, probably at the end of his concert tour (1817–18). After Lipinski performed for Salvini, the teacher asked to see his violin, which he then smashed to pieces against the corner of a table. Salvini handed the shocked Lipinski the Stradivarius: "...as a gift from me, and, simultaneously, as a commemoration of Tartini."

=== Post-Lipinski ===
Following Lipinski's death, the violin passed through numerous collections enumerated by Herbert Goodkind, until it came into the possession of Dr José Martinez Cañas, Havana, Cuba.

=== Contemporary ownership ===
In 1962, the Lipinski Stradivarius was sold to Rosalind Elsner Anschuetz of New York City, for US$19,000. Anschuetz gave the violin to her daughter-in-law, Estonian violinist Evi Liivak, and upon her death in 1996, Liivak's husband, Richard Anschuetz, took possession of the instrument. After Anschuetz moved to the Milwaukee, Wisconsin area, the violin was stored in a local bank vault. Upon Anschuetz' death in February 2008, ownership of the violin passed to an anonymous family member, who lent the Lipinski to Milwaukee Symphony Orchestra concertmaster Frank Almond.

On Monday 27 January 2014 at around 10:20 pm (22:20 CST), Almond was assaulted with a Taser, and the violin, including two bows, was stolen during an armed robbery in a parking lot in the rear of Wisconsin Lutheran College on West Wisconsin Avenue where he had just performed at Wisconsin Lutheran as part of his "Frankly Music" series. A US$100,000 reward was announced for the return of the violin. Milwaukee police worked with international police organizations on recovery efforts. The original getaway vehicle and violin case were both found a short time after the original attack, which appeared to have been carefully planned in advance.

Three suspects were arrested by Milwaukee police on 3 February 2014. On 6 February 2014, Milwaukee Police Chief Edward Flynn announced that the violin had been recovered.

On 13 October 2018, in a piece titled A Violin's Life Almond told the story of his encounters with the violin including its theft and recovery live on stage at an event in New York City for The Moth.

== Provenance ==
- Giuseppe Tartini
- Signor Salvini, Milan
- Karol Lipiński
- Richard Weichold, instrument dealer, Dresden, 1861
- Engelbert Röntgen, Leipzig
- owner not known
- W. E. Hill & Sons, instrument dealers, London, 1899
- Unknown amateur musician, Holland
- Hill & Sons, instrument dealers, London
- owner not known
- Hamma, instrument dealers, Germany
- Unknown
- Wurlitzer, New York, 1922
- Alfredo de Saint Malo, 1927
- Roger Chittolini
- José Martínez Cañas, Havana, 1941
- Wurlitzer, instrument dealers, New York, 1960
- Rosalind Elsner Anschuetz / Richard Anschuetz, Evi Liivak, 1962
- Anonymous Anschuetz family member, Milwaukee, 2008

Joseph Joachim, Liivak, Malonzenoff, and Persinger are also known to have possessed the Lipinski Stradivarius.

== See also ==
- List of Stradivarius instruments
