= Evi Liivak =

Estonian violinist (1924–1996)

Evi Liivak (7 May 1924 – 1 November 1996) was an American violinist of Estonian origin.

== Life ==
Born in Viljandi, Liivak was born the daughter of the music-loving lawyer Henn Liivak and his wife Johanna. She took violin lessons at an early age and studied at the Estonian Academy of Music and Theatre. At the age of eleven, she played with Mendelssohn's Violin Concerto with the Helsinki Philharmonic Orchestra. The following year, she performed Tchaikovsky's Violin Concerto with the Estonian National Symphony Orchestra in Tallinn. In 1937, she was a member of the Estonian delegation to the Queen Elisabeth Competition in Brussels.

After graduating in 1939, the Estonian dictator Konstantin Päts gave her a Maggini violin and a state scholarship to study violin with Ede Zathureczky at the Franz Liszt Academy of Music in Budapest. In the meantime, her home country was first annexed by the Soviet Union and then occupied again after the German Operation Barbarossa in 1941. Her father was killed by the NKVD and she returned to Estonia in her second year of studies. In Berlin, where she actually wanted to obtain papers to continue her studies in Hungary, she got stuck and enrolled at the Universität der Künste Berlin. She attended Max Strub's violin class for several months.

After the bombing of Berlin in World War II in 1944, she moved to Marienwerder near Berlin and to Bad Landeck in Lower Silesia, where Max Strub was able to continue teaching her. She fled from the approaching Red Army to the Franconian town of Fürth. Over the next three years, she performed as a soloist with the Munich Philharmonic, the Frankfurter Opern- und Museumsorchester and the hr-Sinfonieorchester as well as with the symphony orchestras of various larger cities. She played under the direction of conductors Rolf Agop and Hans Rosbaud.

From 1948, she studied with Jules Boucherit in Paris and performed in Sweden, the Netherlands, Italy, France and elsewhere. In 1952, she moved to New York City with her husband, the American concert pianist Richard Anschuetz, who worked as a translator at the Nuremberg trials in the post-war period. Together with the pianist Artur Balsam, she gave her first major concert in 1954 in the Town Hall in Manhattan. She played Jean Rivier's violin concerto, among others. In the US, a Guadagnini violin became her new instrument. From 1962 until her death in 1996 she played on a Stradivari violin from 1715 (the Lipinski Stradivarius).

Concerts abroad followed in Greece, Spain, Portugal and Italy. For Estonian exiles she performed in Canada. She included composers from her home country in her repertoire such as Eduard Tubin, Artur Lemba and Heino Eller. She also worked with the conductor and pianist Olav Roots, who was music director of the Columbia Symphony Orchestra for a long time.

After her death in 1996, Liivak was buried in New York City at the age of 72 at Concordia Cemetery in St. Louis, Missouri.

In 1998, the documentary Armastuse Poeem by Airi Kasera was released in her honour.
