= Kłótnia przez zakład =

Comic opera by Karol Lipiński

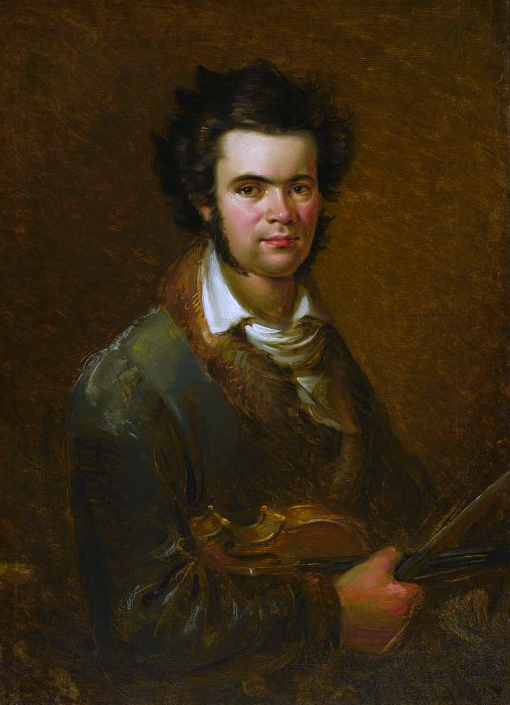
Karol Lipiński (1822)

Kłótnia przez zakład (Polish for A Dispute over a Bet) is a one-act comic opera by Karol Lipiński for a Polish libretto by Jan Nepomucen Kamiński. It was written by Lipiński at an early point of his career, when he was a resident of Lwów (now Lviv, Ukraine), and staged at the city theater before 1814.

== Background ==
=== Text and music ===
The libretto was written by Jan Nepomucen Kamiński, who was the director of the Lviv Polish theatre since 1809. It is based on a Russian comedy The Sable Fur Coat (Соболья шуба, или Спорь до слез, а об закладе не бейся) by Nicolai Kugushev published in 1803. In a handwritten text of the libretto preserved at the National Ossoliński Institute in the Polish city of Wrocław it has two different title pages with two different subtitles referring to its genre: Sceniczna fraszka and Komedyo-opera.

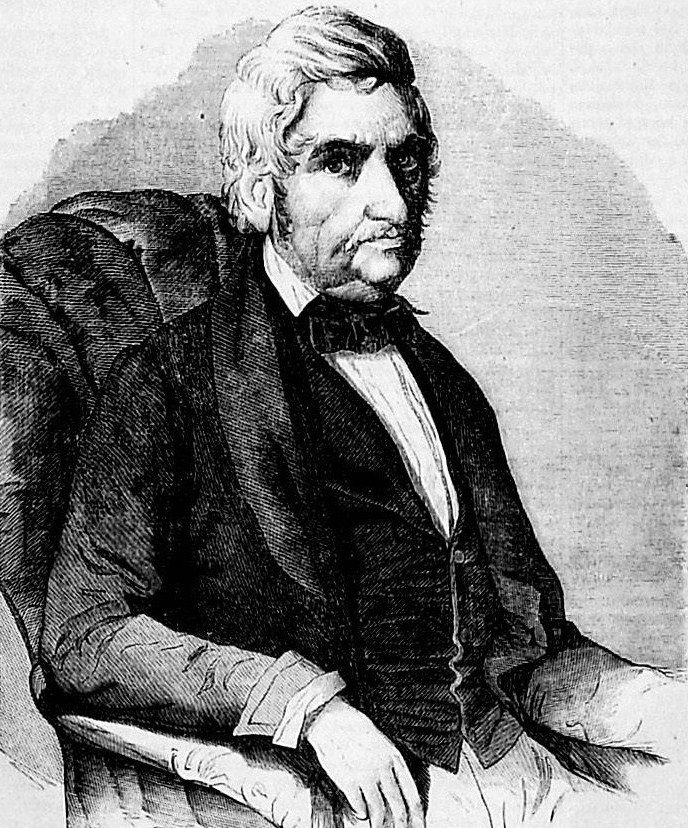
Jan Nepomucen Kamiński

Karol Lipiński was appointed for the post of the first violin and concertmaster at the Lemberg theater in 1810, aged only 20. Two years later he was appointed its conductor. Thus it was for his own use he composed his three only operas, one of them being Kłótnia przez zakład. Around the same time he finished his three symphonies. He left Lviv in 1814.

The overture made use of the famous Polish national tune Jeszcze Polska nie zgineła, a fact that astonished listeners. Another piece of the opera, Starogdyrski's polonaise (Gdzież się podział...), became extremely popular in Lviv for many years.

The manuscript of the libretto and an incomplete set of orchestral parts of the opera is held at the Jagiellonian Library in Kraków. Several texts for the music numbers were printed in 1815 (Rocznik Teatru Polskiego we Lwowie, 1814).

=== Performances ===
The opera was definitely staged in Lviv in 1814, but the first performance took place earlier. It was well received by the public. The role of Sowizdrzalski was played by Antoni Benza, who joined the theatre in 1811.

A much later performance in Poznań (23 August 1838) is also known, with the original title added (Szuba sobolowa czyli Kłótnia przez zakład). The opera was also known as Szuba sobolowa lub brylantowy pierścień albo Zakład o kłótnię (The Sable Fur Coat, or, The Brilliant Ring, or, A Dispute over a Bet).

== Roles ==
- Pan Wąsokrętosz
- Jego żona (his wife)
- Sowizdrzalski, ich domowy przyjaciel (their family friend)
- Gazeciarz (newsboy)
- Żyd (A Jew)
- Postylion (postman)
- Kapitan Burda (Captain Burda)
- Starogdyrski
- Panna Tryndalewiczowna
- Kupczyk (merchant boy)
