= Polonaise de Concert, Op. 4 (Wieniawski) =

Polonaise by Henryk Wieniawski

Polonaise Brillante (Polonaise de Concert) Op. 4 is the first of two polonaises composed by the Polish violin virtuoso Henryk Wieniawski. It was written in two versions: for violin with piano accompaniment, and for violin and orchestra. The version known to us today was published in Germany in 1853 as Polonaise de Concert in D major. However it was originally sketched out in 1848, by a thirteen year old Wieniawski. It was dedicated to the Polish virtuoso violinist Karol Lipiński. It was renamed to Polonaise Brillante when it was re-published in Paris in 1858.

The piece is widely played for its lyrical melodies and demanding technical difficulty.
