= Violin sonata =

Musical composition for violin

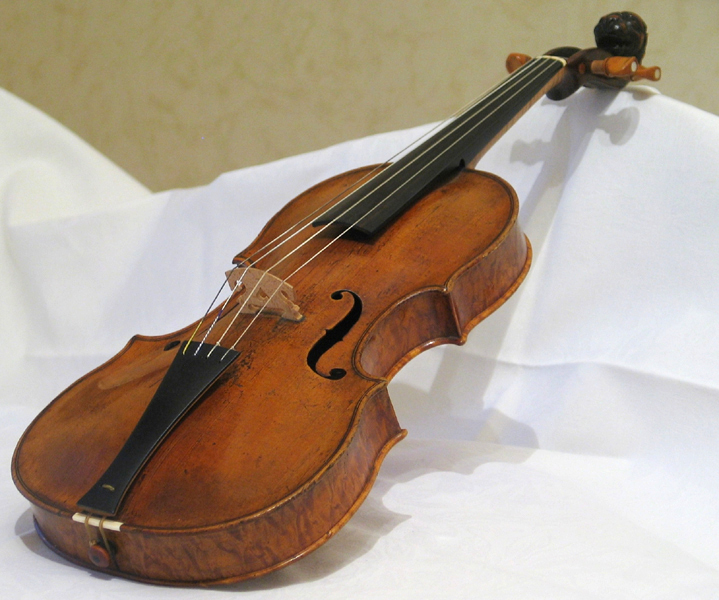

A violin sonata is a musical composition for violin, often accompanied by a keyboard instrument and in earlier periods with a bass instrument doubling the keyboard bass line. The violin sonata developed from a simple baroque form with no fixed format to a standardised and complex classical form. Since the romantic age some composers have pushed the boundaries of both the classical format as well as the use of the instruments.

== The early violin sonata ==
In the earliest violin sonatas a bass instrument and the harpsichord played a simple bass line (continuo) with the harpsichord doubling the bass line and fixed chords while the violin played independently. The music was contrapuntal with no fixed format. Georg Philipp Telemann wrote many such sonatas as did Johann Sebastian Bach. Bach also wrote sonatas with harpsichord obbligato, which freed the keyboard instrument from playing only a bass line accompaniment and allowed in to enhance the part of the soloist. He also wrote sonatas for solo violin without any kind of accompaniment.

== The classical sonata form ==
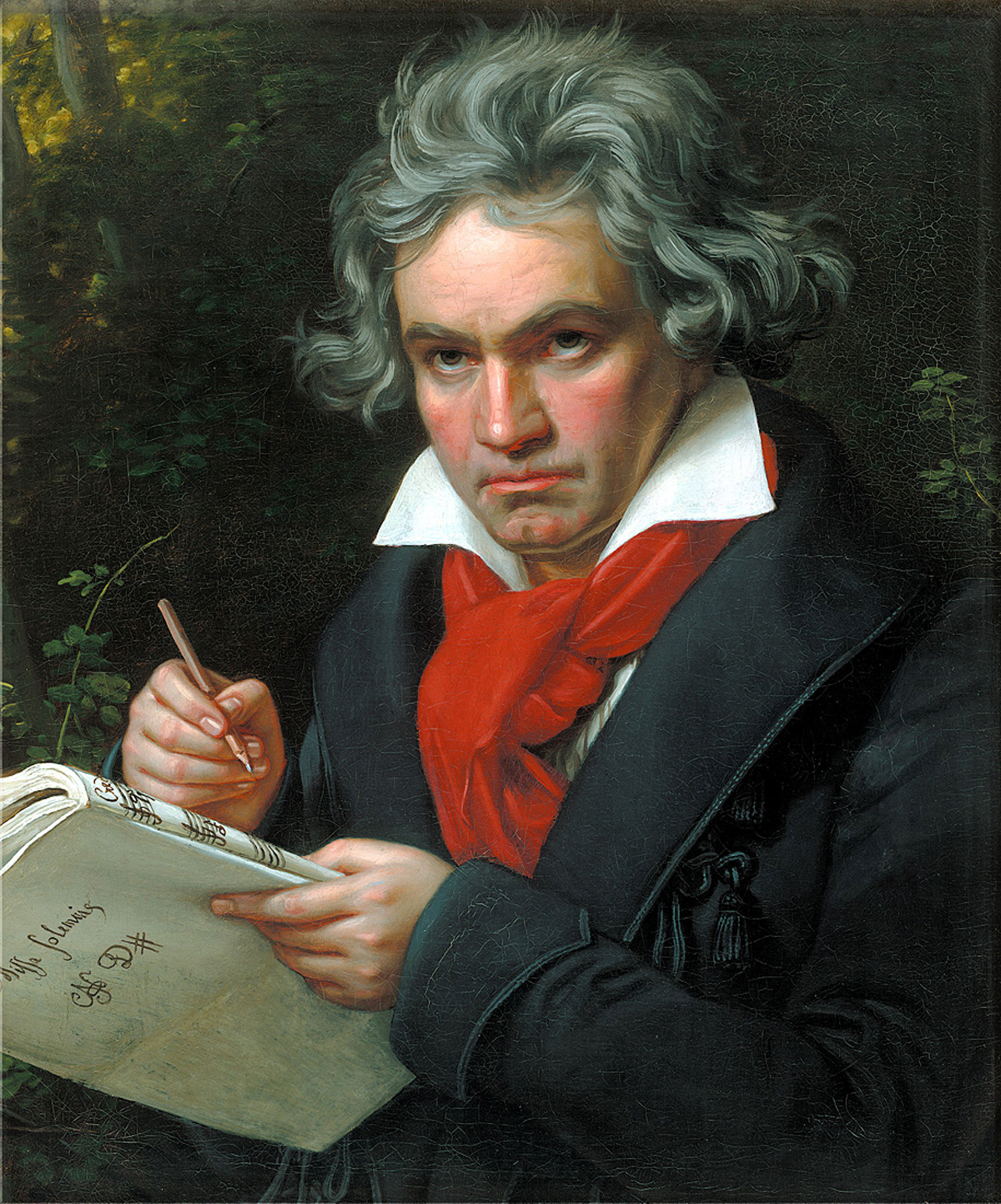
Beethoven's 'Kreutzer' sonata is frequently performed.

Mozart was instrumental in the development of the classical violin sonata of which at least 36 are known. Mozart wrote mostly two movement sonatas, generally a fast movement in sonata form and a second, slower movement in various formats. In his later sonatas he added a third fast movement in various formats. Several of his violin sonatas feature a movement in theme and variation format.

Beethoven wrote ten violin sonatas throughout his composing career. His sonatas matured in both style and complexity; the Kreutzer Sonata is a work of extreme contrast. A rendition typically lasts forty minutes and is very demanding on both players.

Mendelssohn, Schumann, Brahms, Schubert, Weber, Liszt, Richard Strauss, Franck, Fauré, Debussy, Ravel, Prokofiev and Shostakovich amongst other later composers added to the repertoire pushing the form to its limits, or writing rules of their own.

== The modern violin sonata ==
Schnittke (with his polystylistic technique), and Henze are noted modern composers of the violin sonata who have all brought about radical reformation of the classical sonata form as well as new technical demands on the performers.

== See also ==
- List of violin sonatas
- Sonata form
- Violin
- Violin concerto
- Sonata
