= Klara Berkovich =

Ukrainian violinist (1928–2024)

Klara Yefimovna Berkovich
- Клара Ефимовна Беркович
- Born: Klara Yefimovna Gordion; May 19, 1928; Odesa, Ukrainian SSR, Soviet Union (present-day Ukraine)
- Died: July 22, 2024 (aged 96); United States
- Occupations: Violinist, violin teacher

Klara Yefimovna Berkovich (Note: Russian: Клара Ефимовна Беркович, romanized: Klara Yefimovna Berkovich) (née Gordion; (Note: Russian: Гордион, romanized: Gordion) 19 May 1928 – 22 July 2024) was a Soviet and American violinist and master violin teacher who divided her career between the Soviet Union and the United States.

== Early life ==
Klara Berkovich was born in Odesa, Ukraine (then part of the Soviet Union), the only child of Yefim Josefovich Gordion, a machinist, and Adele Raphaelovna Tesler, a teacher of Russian language and literature. A cosmopolitan city, Odesa was becoming a hotbed of Soviet violinists, thanks largely to Pyotr Stolyarsky and his disciples, who perfected a pedagogical method for teaching children from ages as young as four. Nathan Milstein, David Oistrakh, Boris Goldstein, Elizabeth Gilels, and Mikhail Fikhtengoltz would all emerge from Odesa, along with many others.

In 1934, Klara at age seven began to study violin at Special Music School No. 1 with Viktor Karakes, a former student of Stolyarsky who in addition to teaching played in theatre orchestras. Alongside her musical studies, Klara pursued regular academic studies in the public schools of Odesa.

== During World War II ==
World War II threw Odesa into turmoil. When Klara was 13, the German army invaded the Ukrainian SSR and the Soviet Union was drawn into World War II on the side of the Allies. Needing soldiers, the Soviet army conscripted many ordinary citizens from Odesa, among them Yefim Gordion, Klara's father, who was 49 years old. The family never saw him again.

As Nazi forces closed on Odesa, Klara and her mother—knowing the danger they faced as Jews—fled by ship on 12 August 1941, across the Black Sea. Seeking sanctuary, they wound up in the village of Kafkas, where they stayed for a year. During that time Klara taught her first violin student.

In August 1942, with the Germans advancing more deeply into the Soviet Union, Klara and her mother left Kafkas on foot. Moving to the east and north and traveling alone, they walked, hitchhiked, jumped freight trains, and slept in train stations and city squares. As they moved, part of a great tide of travelers, they survived by taking odd jobs and by selling Mrs. Gordion's wedding ring and all else they could spare. In two months on the road, they covered more than 1500 miles. They arrived in the Siberian town of Novosibirsk in October, just before winter 1942. It was already so cold that the milk froze on the streets.

Mother and daughter remained in Novosibirsk until the end of World War II, a period of nearly three years. Klara attended public high school in Novosibirsk for her academic work and resumed musical studies in the Novosibirsk Special Music School. There her new violin professor was Josef Gutmann, a fine and experienced teacher who had fled Kyiv for Siberia to escape the Germans. Gutmann refined her playing along lines of greater ease and relaxation and prepared her for conservatory studies.

== In post-war Odesa ==
In 1945 the war ended and Klara graduated from high school in Novosibirsk. With the Nazis defeated and departed, she and her mother returned to find a devastated Odesa. Klara, now 17, auditioned for the Odesa Conservatory. She was admitted as a student of Leonid Lembersky, a renowned pedagogue and former student of Stolyarsky who concertized widely as a soloist and chamber musician in the Ukraine. In addition to his conservatory students, Lembersky also taught several students in the elite Stolyarsky Academy. (Lembersky's daughter, Suzanna Lemberskaya, was for a time a student of Klara's; she later became a pianist and opera coach with the San Francisco and Pittsburgh operas.)

Under Lembersky, Gordion pursued a five-year program that led to her master's degree in Chamber Music and Teaching in 1951 at the age of 23. The year she graduated, she won a section position as first violinist in the Orchestra of the Odesa Theatre of Opera and Ballet.

== In Leningrad ==
After two years in the Odesa opera orchestra, Klara met Adam Adolfovich Berkovich, a 25-year-old army engineer who was visiting his parents in Odesa. They had known each other slightly as children, and soon they married. Adam was based in Leningrad, so Klara and her mother left Odesa and joined him there.

Arriving in the city in 1953, Klara Berkovich wanted to teach, but she lacked connections in the music community. When she applied to the civic authorities for a position in the city's music schools, she was told there were no local openings for inexperienced candidates. There was, however, a vacancy in Vyborg, a formerly Finnish town six hours to the north by train. She took the job. Every Wednesday she caught the midnight train to Vyborg, taught children Thursday through Saturday, and returned to Leningrad on the Saturday overnight. At the end of the school year her work was examined by the musical authorities in Leningrad, and she was awarded a permanent teaching position at the Special School for the Musically Gifted in the Leningrad borough of Petrograd.

At that Special School, from 1954 to 1978, Klara Berkovich focused on students in grades 1–8, preparing them for admission to the elite preparatory high school of the Leningrad Conservatory. Over that time she became one of the most esteemed teachers of young violinists in the city. Among her many students in Leningrad were Katia Borkhsenius, Olga Mardkovich, Yudif Yofah, Marina Klurfeld, and Leonid Berkovich.

== Decision to emigrate ==
In April 1978, Adele Gordion, Klara's mother, died at the age of 84. This happened at a time when the Soviet Union was briefly loosening its emigration restrictions for Jews. The Berkoviches had long thought that their two boys would have greater opportunities if they started a new life elsewhere. After looking into the support available outside the Soviet Union for emigrating Jews, they decided to emigrate. To sidestep being dismissed for disloyalty, Berkovich, with 25 years of teaching experience and eligible for a pension, quietly retired from her job in December 1978. Immediately thereafter Adam, as the head of the family, applied to emigrate with his wife and their two sons—and received the routine harangue at work before being fired.

After a four-month wait in Leningrad, in March 1979 the Berkoviches obtained visas and left for Vienna, Austria. They were permitted to carry out of the Soviet Union three suitcases for their family of four. Berkovich's violin was judged too valuable to be permitted to leave the country, so she gave it to her student Lena Ilyichova. Her son's violin, however, was deemed cheap enough to go with him. After two months in Vienna, where Jewish aid organizations assisted them, the Berkoviches traveled to a suburb of Rome, Italy, where they waited weeks more for entry visas to arrive from the United States.

== In Baltimore ==
In June 1979, the Berkovich family flew to Baltimore, Maryland. Berkovich and her husband were 51; their sons were 20 and 24. Her entire vocabulary in English consisted of three sentences: "My name is Klara." "I come from Leningrad." "I am a violin teacher."

With no musical contacts in the Baltimore community, Berkovich began to study English and taught violin to the children of other Soviet immigrants in the Jewish community for free. When she thought they were ready, she formed her studio into a performing group that played together in synagogues, schools, at open-air fairs—anywhere they could get a hearing. After nine months of teaching in Baltimore, Berkovich invited the director of the Peabody Conservatory's preparatory division, Lynn Taylor Hebden, to come to a performance. After the concert, Hebden offered scholarship aid at the Peabody Preparatory to the students and a part-time teaching job to Berkovich, with her initial responsibility being to continue teaching those students under the auspices of the Prep.

In September 1980, Berkovich was assigned her first English speaking students and became a regular part-time instructor at the Peabody Preparatory. Shortly thereafter, she found a second part-time position, this one giving violin lessons to talented students from several public schools in Baltimore at two locations: City College High School and Roland Park Elementary School. This teaching was part of the program of the Baltimore Talent Education Center (BTEC), a city-wide magnet program. Travel was required between the two locations, so at age 52 Berkovich bought a used car and learned to drive.

Her part-time status lasted less than a year. In May 1981, both the Peabody Prep and BTEC invited her to join their faculties as a regular teacher and offered her full benefits. In addition she maintained a studio of private students in her home, and in 1984 she added summer teaching when she joined the faculty of a Baltimore children's workshop called the Bryn Mawr String Camp. In the summer of 1985, one of the smallest students in her elementary class at the camp was a five-year-old Suzuki beginner named Hilary Hahn, who a few months later entered Berkovich's studio at the Peabody Preparatory.

== Approach to teaching ==
Hilary Hahn would later describe Berkovich's teaching in interviews. "I studied with her for five years at Peabody Prep. She taught me how to draw my bow, how to play double stops, vibrato, pizzicato—basically everything you need to know to play the violin. She also taught me the basics of phrasing, so I knew what to do with a phrase and how to make something interesting." Among other things, Berkovich used to tell Hahn, "You only have to practice on the days you eat," and "what shows a true musician is that you can sustain a long line in a slow section." Others recalled Berkovich speaking to children about upcoming performances: "When you perform, you're the hostess. The members of the audience are the guests you invite into your house. You give them the gift of the performance.... The idea is that it's important to get the piece across well so that the people can enjoy it more. The fun of it is the fun of sharing something you can do well."

Berkovich also stressed the importance of a positive learning environment. Interviewed in the Baltimore Sun, she said, "I know many children who are very gifted. But if the children are not taught how to organize themselves, how to work, how to be goal-oriented, then their talent does not become realized." And she paid close attention to the capacity of her students. Describing her work with Hilary Hahn, she told the Sun, "'She was 5 when I met her.... She played me a song with four lines that was a minute and a half long. Five and a half years later, she played a solo recital with a program that took more than an hour... Hilary has the gift of nature. She is musical. And she is a bright child, always with a book... Well-organized with a long span of concentration. Diligent. I never told her two times the same thing. Whatever I told her, it was done for the next lesson, sometimes with extra.... And when she was progressing so fast, I would tell her parents, 'I'm afraid to push too much, she's still 6, 7! Doesn't she complain it's too hard for her?' But it was never too much. I cannot say she was ever overworked."

== Later life and death ==
In the United States, Berkovich's reputation as a teacher grew quickly, supported both by the playing of her students and by her clear and musical way of teaching in repertoire and master classes throughout the Mid-Atlantic region. In May 1989, she was named "String Teacher of the Year" by the Maryland/D.C. chapter of the American String Teachers Association. In 1990 Klara Berkovich retired from teaching at the Baltimore Talent Education Center, and in 1992 she retired from the Peabody Preparatory. She maintained a small private studio of students well into her 80s. Berkovich died on 22 July 2024, at the age of 96.
