= Zinaida Gilels =

Soviet and American violinist (1924–2000)

Zinaida Grigoryevna Gilels (Russian: Зинаида Григорьевна Гилельс; Ukrainian: Зінаїда Григорівна Гілельс; February 24, 1924 – May 7, 2000) was a Soviet and later an American violinist and pedagogue.

== Biography ==
Zinaida Gilels was born in Odessa, Ukrainian SSR, to Grigory and Rosalia (née Diner) Gilels, a Jewish family. She was a niece of Elizabeth Gilels and Emil Gilels.

She studied with Pyotr Stolyarsky from the age of seven, and was a student at the School of Stolyarsky from 1934 until 1938. That same year she entered Moscow Central Music School where she spent five further years studying with Abram Yampolsky. Then from 1943 until her graduation in 1949 she studied at the Moscow Conservatory with David Oistrach.

She taught at Moscow Central Music School from 1960 until 1983, first as an assistant of Yury Yankelevich, and then leading her own studio. After coming to the US in 1985 she worked in Longy School of Music from 1986, in New England Conservatory from 1989, and in Boston Conservatory from 1994.

She was a visiting professor in the Institute Musicale St. Cecilia, Portogruaro, Italy since 1986, in the Violin School and Festival in Kuhmo, Finland from 1987 to 1992, and in Ryoko Saski School Music, in Tokyo, Japan from 1994. In 1991 she adjudicated the Paganini competition.

She developed a teaching method to enable young violinists to overcome the difficulties of playing the violin, and her method is continued in the Zinaida Gilels Violin School in Latisana, Italy. Among her former students are many internationally known violinists, including Ilya Grubert, Nazar Kozhukhar, Lev Gelbard, Ilya Kaler, Stefan Jackiw, and Ilja Sekler.
