= Stanisław Barcewicz =

Polish violinist, conductor and teacher

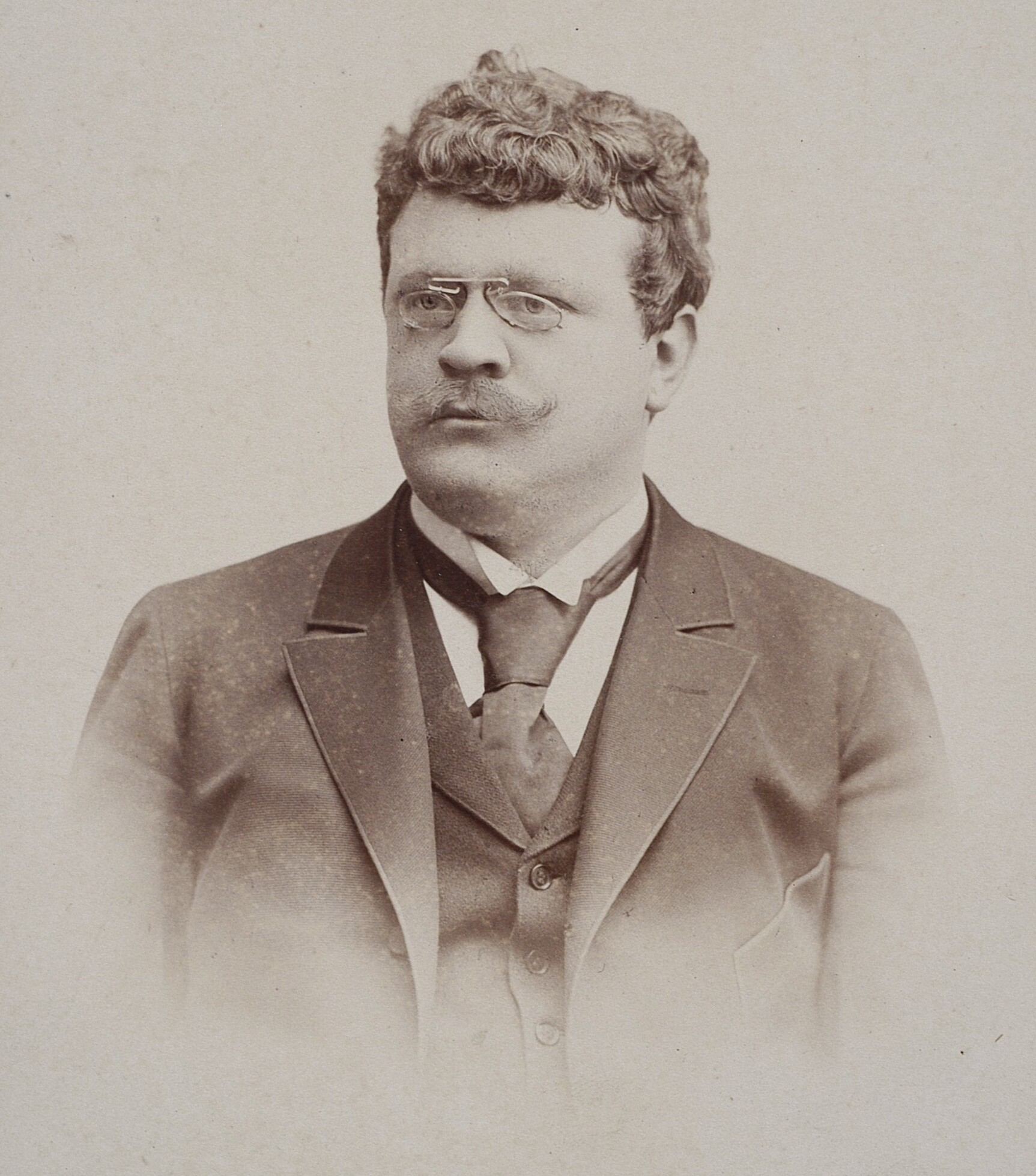
- Born: 16 April 1858
- Died: 1 September 1929 (aged 71)

Stanisław Barcewicz (16 April 1858 – 1 September 1929) was a Polish violinist, conductor and teacher. Although his repertoire included almost all of the classical and romantic violin literature, he was valued primarily for his interpretations of works by Henryk Wieniawski and Felix Mendelssohn. He also premiered works by his teacher Pyotr Ilyich Tchaikovsky, including the Polish premiere of the Violin Concerto in D. He played on a Guadagnini violin.

== Biography ==
Stanisław Barcewicz was born in Warsaw in 1858, and first studied violin at the Institute of Music there under Apollinaire de Kontski (Apolinary Kątski) and Władysław Gorski. At the age of 11 he publicly performed Beriot's Violin Concerto No. 7 in G major. He then studied at the Moscow Conservatory, where his teachers were Ferdinand Laub, Jan Hřímalý and Pyotr Ilyich Tchaikovsky. He graduated in 1876 with a Gold Medal.

On 20 or 21 September 1878, as part of the 1878 Paris World Exhibition, he performed at the Trocadéro in a concert of works by Tchaikovsky, including the first public performance of the Valse-Scherzo in C, conducted by Nikolai Rubinstein. He later toured Europe extensively, including appearances in Leipzig, Dresden, Hamburg, Elberfeld, Koblenz, Berlin, Königsberg, London, Denmark, Sweden, Norway, Russia, and Riga.

In 1881 Barcewicz premiered Johan Svendsen's Romance for Violin and Orchestra in Kristiania (Oslo). On 14 January 1892 he gave the Polish premieres of Tchaikovsky's Violin Concerto in D and Sérénade mélancolique, in Warsaw, under the composer's baton.

In 1885, he became the concertmaster and second conductor of the Warsaw Opera. He occasionally conducted operas there, and he also conducted the Warsaw Philharmonic Orchestra. In 1886, he was appointed violin and viola professor at the Warsaw Conservatory, and was the institution's Director from 1910 to 1918, succeeding Emil Młynarski. Among his pupils in Warsaw can be mentioned Mieczysław Karłowicz, Grzegorz Fitelberg, Pyotr Stolyarsky (teacher of David Oistrakh, Nathan Milstein, Boris Goldstein, Mikhail Goldstein and others), Henryk Gold, Aleksander Jabłoński (later to become a renowned physicist), Paul Godwin, and Józef Ozimiński.

Barcewicz also founded and led the Warsaw String Quartet from 1892 until his death, and he also played in a renowned piano trio with the Polish pianist Aleksander Michałowski and the Russian cellist Aleksandr Verzhbilovich.

In 1902 his former pupil Mieczysław Karłowicz wrote his Violin Concerto in A major, Op. 8 for Barcewicz, who premiered it on 21 March 1903 with the Berlin Philharmonic under the composer.

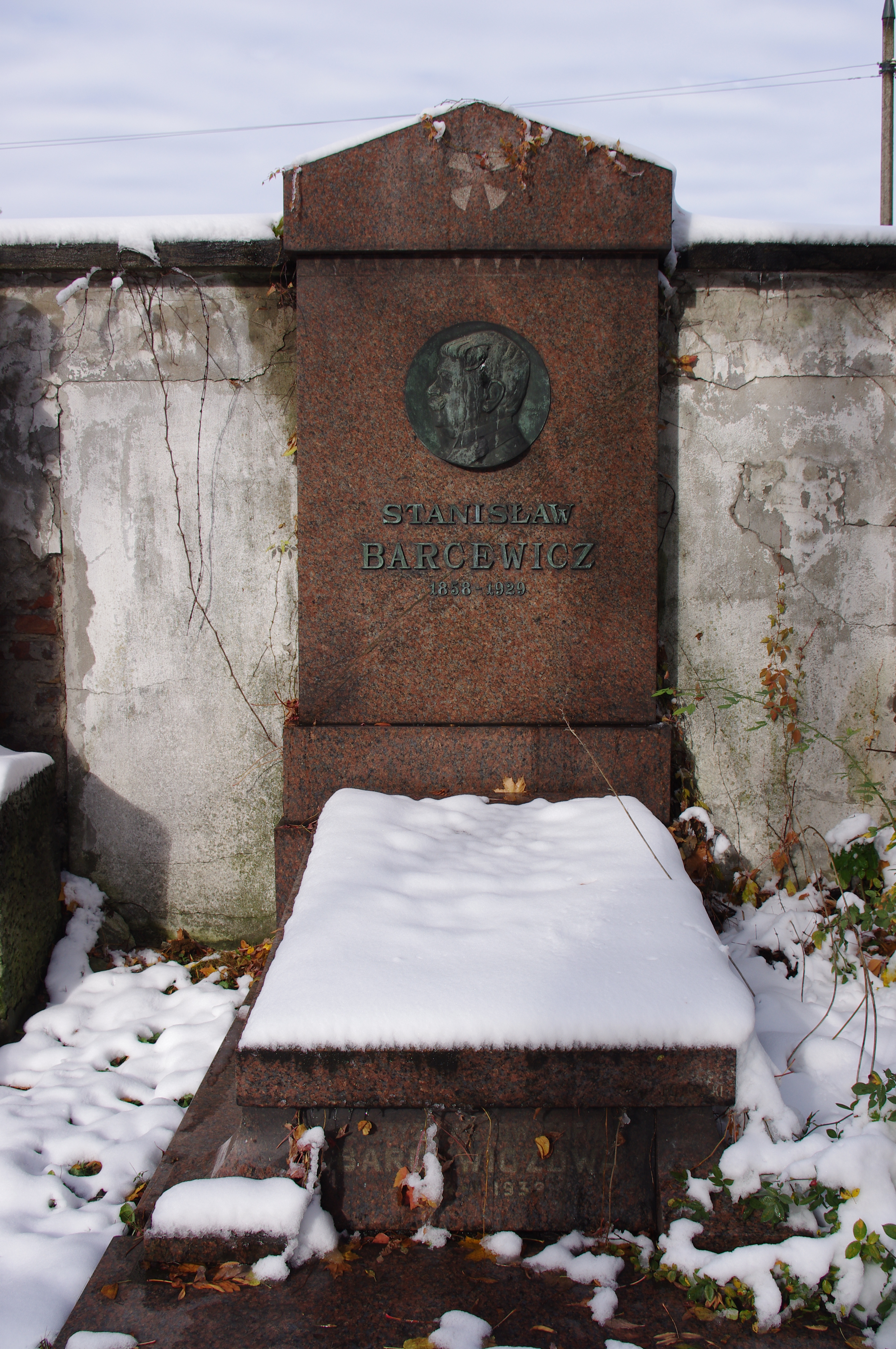
Stanisław Barcewicz's grave at the Powązki Cemetery in Warsaw

Barcewicz died in Warsaw in 1929, aged 71.

== Recordings ==
He can be heard on the double CD set The Great Violinists, playing pieces recorded in 1905 with piano accompaniment:

- Paderewski's Melodie, Op. 15/2 (Barcewicz's own arrangement)
- the Canzonetta from the Violin Concerto in D by Tchaikovsky; and
- Henryk Wieniawski's Kujawiak Mazurka in A minor, Op. 3.

As an indication of his standing, other violinists in the collection include Joseph Joachim, Eugène Ysaÿe, Pablo de Sarasate, Arnold Rosé, Jan Kubelík, Willy Burmester, Jacques Thibaud, Marie Hall, Franz von Vecsey, Joseph Szigeti and Fritz Kreisler.
