= School of Stolyarsky =

Music school in Odesa, Ukraine

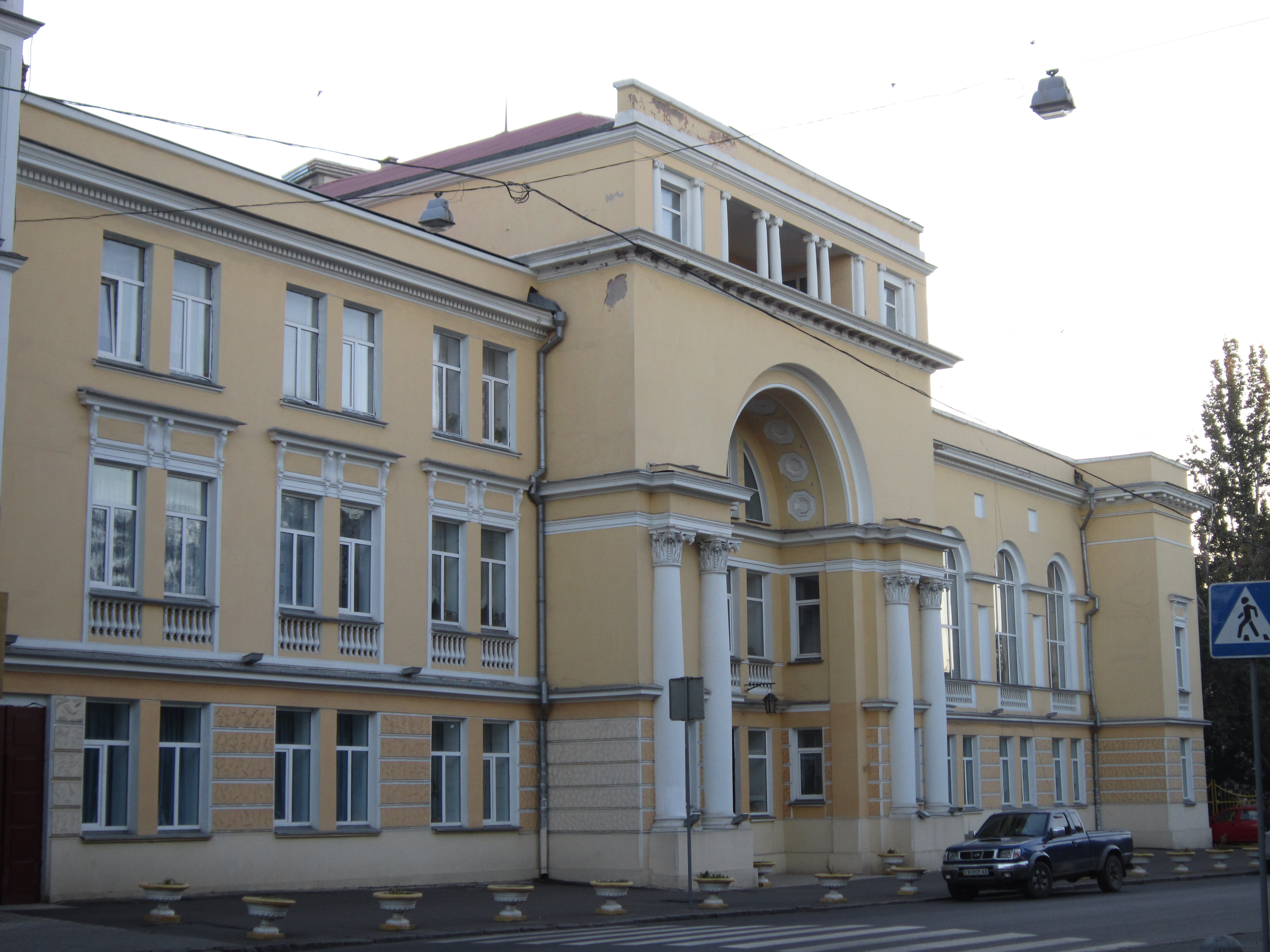
School of Stolyarsky in Odesa

Stolyarsky School is a music school for musically gifted children established in 1933 in Odesa, Ukraine, by the violin pedagogue Pyotr Stolyarsky.

At the start of his career, Stolyarsky, a master violinist, offered private violin lessons in his studio and subsequently became the founding member of the Stolyarsky Specialized Music School of Odesa.

The school offered musical instruction for gifted children from a young age; to be admitted to the school, a child had to have perfect pitch and was examined in a series of rigorous evaluations.

Notable pupils included David Oistrakh, Nathan Milstein, Samuil Furer, Boris Goldstein, Mikhail Goldstein, Elizabeth Gilels (sister of pianist Emil Gilels and wife of the Soviet violinist Leonid Kogan), Igor Oistrakh, Mikhail Fikhtengoltz, composer Oscar Feltsman, and Eduard Grach.

Stolyarsky's students won various prizes in competitions, including the 1935 Wieniawski competition in Warsaw; placed entrants included Ginette Neveu, David Oistrakh, Henri Temianka, Boris Goldstein, and Josef Hassid. In 1937 at the Eugène Ysaÿe Competition, the Stolyarsky students David Oistrakh, Boris Goldstein, Yelizaveta Gilels, and Mikhail Fikhtengoltz won prizes.

After the professor's death, the Stolyarsky school continued to produce a new generation of notable musicians from the 1950s to the 1970s; among them were Margarita Lekhter, Rudolf Lekhter, Mark Zinger, Zakhar Bron, Boris Bloch, Mikhail Vaiman, Evgeny Mogilevsky, Dora Schwarzberg, Pavel Vernikov, Karmella Tsepkolenko, Alexander Vinitsky, Arkady Shindelman, Alexander and Mark Peskanov, and Gennady Filimonov.

The school continues to operate to the present day, and the foundations of musical education, as laid down by Stolyarsky, are still adhered to by his followers.
