= Nadezda Tokareva =

Russian-Slovenian classical violinist

Nadezda Tokareva Надежда Владимировна Токарева
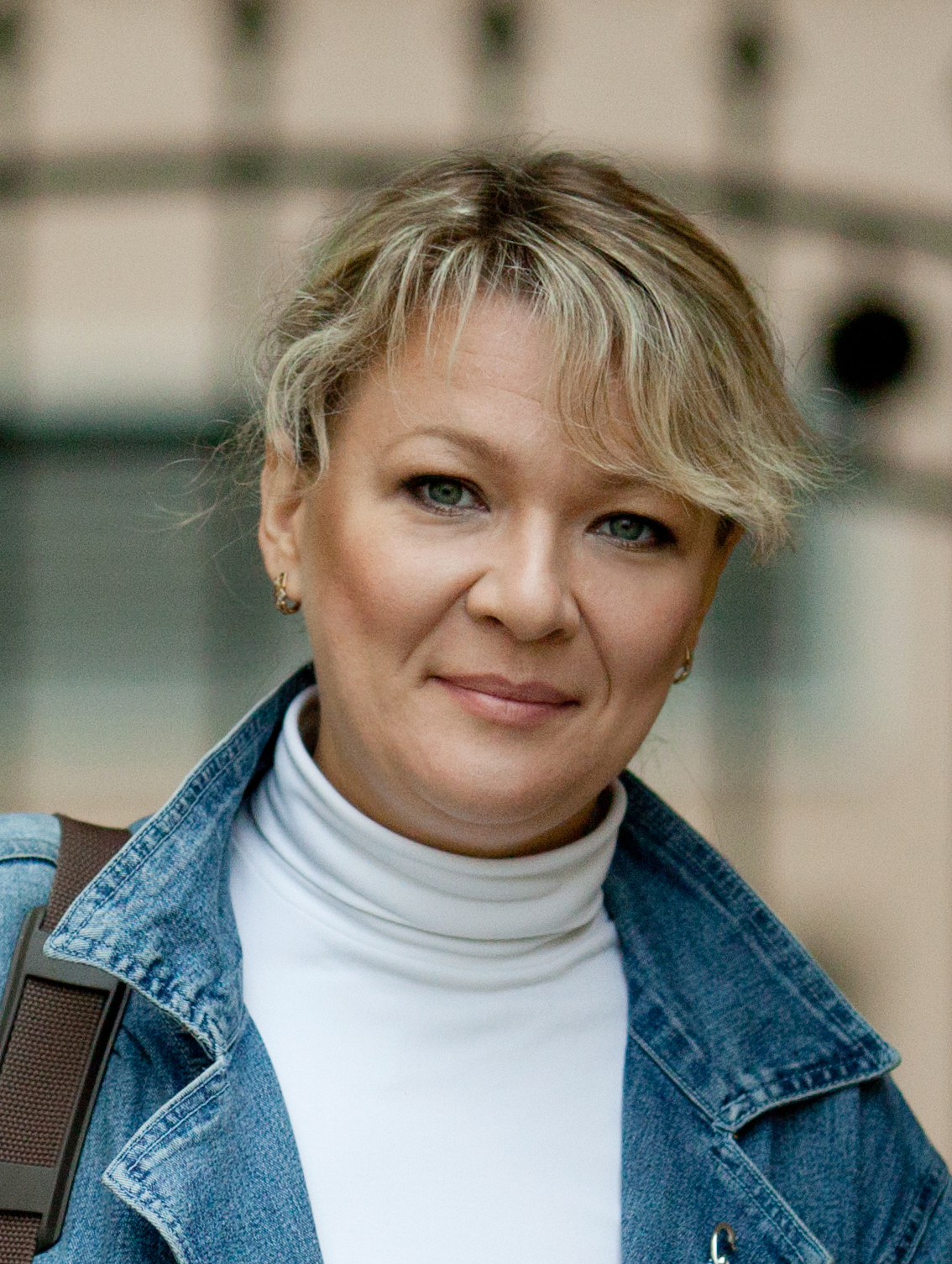

Background information
- Born: 27 November 1977 (age 48); Penza, Russian SFSR, Soviet Union
- Genres: Baroque, Classical, Romantic
- Occupations: Violinist, music teacher
- Instrument: Violin
- Years active: 1996–present
- Labels: "Harmony", Dowani International, DSS
- Website: artists-classic.com/en/nadezda-tokareva/

Nadezda Tokareva (Russian: Надежда Владимировна Токарева; born 27 November 1977) is a Russian-Slovenian classical violinist and teacher, based in Ljubljana, Slovenia.

== Life and career ==
Tokareva studied at the Moscow State Tchaikovsky Conservatory from 1996 to 2001 under professor Eduard Grach, and from 2001 to 2003 when she studied as a postgraduate.

From March 1999 to 2012, she was a soloist-violinist of Moscow State Academy Philharmonic Society.

She has performed in the principal Moscow concert halls, including the Great and Small Halls of the Moscow Conservatory, the Tchaikovsky Hall, and the Svetlanov and Chamber Halls of the Moscow International House of Music. Her concert schedule includes venues in more than 30 countries including Russia, the United States, several countries of Western and Eastern Europe, Israel, Turkey, Iran, Egypt, Morocco, Vietnam, China, South Korea, North Korea and Japan. She has performed with such orchestras as: State Academic Symphony Orchestra of the Russian Federation, Moscow Philharmonic Orchestra, Moscow State Symphony Orchestra, State Symphony Cinema Orchestra, Moscow City Symphony Orchestra, Saint Petersburg State Symphony orchestra "Classica", Polish National Radio Symphony Orchestra, RTV Slovenia Symphony Orchestra, Academic Orchestra of Russian Folk Instruments of RTV, Osipov State Russian Folk Orchestra, Orchestra di Padova e del Veneto (OPV) (Italy), Kyiv Chamber Orchestra (Ukraine) and others. She has toured twice as soloist and concertmaster with the Moscow State Radio Symphony orchestra in the United States in 2004 and 2010 with great success. Her partners on scene in different years were such conductors as: Alexander Vedernikov, Pavel Sorokin, Pavel Kogan, Sergei Skripka, Roman Kofman, Vladimir Ponkin, Konstantin Krimets, Murad Annamamedov, Felix Korobov, Alexander Kantorov, Robert Debbaut (USA), Bogusław Dawidow (Poland), Agnieszka Duczmal (Poland), Anton Nanut (Slovenia), Andres Mustonen (Estonia) and many others.

She is the first performer in Russia of the "Russian Concerto" by Édouard Lalo, "Concerto of Light and Shadow" for violin and orchestra by Peeter Vähi, and Sonata for violin and piano No. 2 by Valery Arzoumanov (dedicated to N. Tokareva). She is the first performer of Violin Concerto by Hugo Wolf.

Since 2002 she has combined concert activity with teaching at the Moscow Conservatory as an assistant to Professor Eduard Grach, and since 2006 she has led her own class. From 2010 to 2013 – an associate professor and secretary of the Department of Violin of the Moscow Conservatory. From 2006 to 2009 she was a guest professor at Kurashiki Sakuyo University, Japan. From 2011 to 2014 she served as an associate professor of the Maimonides State Classical Academy, Moscow. From 2011 to 2012 Tokareva was concertmaster of RTV Slovenia Symphony Orchestra. During this stint Tokareva performed an anniversary concert with the renowned Slovenian conductor Anton Nanut at short notice, earning media acclaim for her performance.

On April 8, 2017, in the Tartini House in Piran, Tokareva was a soloist in Giuseppe Tartini's 325st Birthday Celebration Concert, performing on one of Tartini's own 18th-century violins. Tokareva performed Devil's Trill Sonata, as well as a number of works by Italian authors. The concert was broadcast live on Radio Slovenia.

Since 2011 Tokareva lives in Slovenia, where she continues to perform and teach. She has the ability to adapt her style to accommodate the demands of a wide musical repertoire from baroque to contemporary composers. Her repertoire consists of around 40 violin concertos and many chamber music works. Tokareva is the author of a number of violin transcriptions and arrangements and violin premiers and the first performer of Slovenian authors' works. She frequently records for the State Radio of Slovenia and gives master classes.

== Awards ==
- Third prize at VII International competition of violinists in Germany (Kloster – Schontal, 1997)
- Grand Prix at I International competition "The Violin of the North" (Yakutsk, 1997)
- First prize at II Yampolsky International Competition (Penza, 1999)
- Special prize at XII International Tchaikovsky Competition (Moscow, 2002)
- Special prize at the International Competition M. Long – J. Thibaud (Paris, 2002)
- Second prize at the I Moscow International Paganini Violin Competition (Moscow, 2003)
- Winner of April Spring Friendship Art Festival (North Korea, 2006).

== Discography ==
- 2004 — A.Eshpai Concerto No. 3 for Violin and orchestra (Musical publishing house "Harmony")
- 2005 — W.A.Mozart Concerto for Violin and orchestra D-dur, KV 211 (Dowani International, DOW 04513–400)
- 2015 — I.Petrić All Works for Violin and Piano (Ars Slovenika, Ed.DSS 2015102)
