= Valery Klimov (violinist) =

Russian musician (1931–2022)

Valery Klimov Валерий Климов
- Born: October 16, 1931; Kiev, Ukrainian SSR, Soviet Union
- Died: 2022 (aged 90–91)
- Genres: Classical
- Occupations: Violinist; Teacher
- Instrument: Violin

Valery Aleksandrovich Klimov (Note: Russian: Валерий Александрович Климов, romanized: Valery Aleksandrovich Klimov; Ukrainian: Валерій Олександрович Климов, romanized: Valerii Oleksandrovych Klymov) (October 16, 1931 – February 22, 2022) was a Soviet violinist.

== Biography ==
Klimov was born on October 16, 1931 in Kyiv (then in the Soviet Union, now in Ukraine). He began to study music under the guidance of his father - conductor and teacher Alexander Ignatievich Klimov. From the age of 7 (with a break for evacuation in Stalingrad during the war) he studied at the Odessa Music Boarding School for Gifted Children with Pyotr Stolyarsky (now called the School of Stolyarsky). Starting in 1945, he studied with B.Z. Mordkovich. In 1949 he performed public concerts featuring repertoire by Alexander Glazunov, W.A. Mozart and Felix Mendelssohn. There he met David Oistrakh whom he studied with at the Moscow Conservatory.

In 1951 he entered the Kyiv Conservatory (now the Petro Tchaikovsky National Music Academy of Ukraine), where he studied under B.S. Fishman. After a year of study, he was transferred to the Moscow Conservatory in the studio of David Oistrakh (graduated with honors in 1956, graduate school in 1959 under his tutelage).

In 1955, he took sixth place in the Long-Thibaud-Crespin Competition. A year later, he became the winner of the J. Slavik and F. Ondřicek violin competition at the Prague Spring International Music Festival, but his main success was brought by the 1st International Tchaikovsky Competition (1958), where he won the Gold Medal in the violin category.

Beginning in 1957, he was a soloist of the Moscow Philharmonic Society. He performed with the largest orchestras in the world under the direction of conductors including Yevgeny Svetlanov, Kirill Kondrashin, Gennady Rozhdestvensky, Konstantin Ivanov, Arvīds Jansons, Leonard Bernstein (USA), Eugene Ormandy (USA), Carlo Zecchi (Italy), Wolfgang Sawallisch (Germany), Norman Del Mar (Great Britain), Serge Baudo (France), Franz-Paul Decker (Canada), and others. Among the famous orchestras - the Leningrad Philharmonic Orchestra (renamed in 1991 as the Saint Petersburg Philharmonic Orchestra), the Bolshoi Symphony Orchestra of the All-Union Radio and Television, the London Symphony Orchestra the BBC Symphony Orchestra, the Berlin Philharmonic Orchestra, Royal Concertgebouw Orchestra (Amsterdam), New York Symphony Orchestra, Washington State Orchestra, Philadelphia Symphony Orchestra, Tokyo Symphony Orchestra and other groups. For 25 years, he continued his relationship with the USSR State Academic Symphony Orchestra (now the State Academic Symphony Orchestra of the Russian Federation). He gave concerts in world famous halls such as the Great Hall of the Moscow Conservatory, the Bolshoi Zal (Great Hall) of the Leningrad Philharmonic, Carnegie Hall, Lincoln Center, Madison Square Garden, Festival Hall, Albert Hall, the Wiener Musikverein, the great hall of the Berlin Philharmonic, the Gewandhaus in Leipzig, the Sydney Opera House, and many others.

Klimov had numerous records on phonograph and compact disc made by Melodia (Russia), EMI Elektrola (Great Britain), Ariola (Germany), Toshiba (Japan), Victor Company and Angel Records ( USA), "Le Chant du Monde" (France), etc.

From 1965 to 1989 he taught at the Moscow Conservatory (since 1974 - head of the department of violin, since 1983 - professor). His students included Aiman Musakhodzhaeva, Gernot Winischhofer, Elena Denisova, Evgeny Bushkov, and many others.

Klimov repeatedly participated in the jury of many international competitions including the P.I. Tchaikovsky in Moscow, M. Long - J. Thibaud in Paris, N. Paganini in Genoa, W.A. Mozart in Salzburg, J. Sibelius in Helsinki, G. Kulenkampf in Cologne, as well as in competitions in Montreal and Tokyo, etc.

In 1989, he won a position to teach at the Hochschule für Musik Saar in Germany.

Klimov died on 2022, at the age of 91.

== Awards and titles ==
- Laureate of the International Violin Competition at the III World Festival of Youth and Students in Berlin (1951)
- Laureate of the International Violin Competition. M. Long and J. Thibaud in Paris (1955, 6th Prize)
- Laureate of the violin competition named after J. Slavik and F. Ondřicek as part of the Prague Spring International Music Festival (1956, 1st prize)
- Laureate of the International Tchaikovsky Competition in Moscow (1958, 1st prize)
- Honored Artist of the RSFSR (1962)
- People's Artist of the RSFSR (1972)
- People's Artist of the USSR (1989).
