= Ilja Sekler =

Russian violinist (born 1971)

- Илья Секлер
- Born: 1971 (age 54–55); Moscow, Russia
- Education: Moscow Conservatory; Hochschule für Musik Hanns Eisler
- Occupation: Violinist
- Years active: 1990s
- Employer: Deutsches Symphonie-Orchester Berlin
- Style: Classical

Ilja Sekler (Russian: Илья Секлер, born 1971, Moscow) is a Russian-born violinist who works in Germany.

== Biography ==
Sekler was born into a musical family. His father, Mikhail Sekler, is a virtuoso prizewinning violinist. Sekler began his violin training in Moscow at the Central Special Music School under the tutlage of Zinaida Gilels and Alexander Vinnitsky and later studied at the Moscow Conservatory with Valeri Klimov and Sergei Girschenko. He also studied with Werner Scholz at the Hochschule für Musik Hanns Eisler, which he graduated with distinction in 1998, and received important artistic experiences during the master classes of Wolfgang Marschner.

Sekler won prizes at the Paganini International Violin Competition in 1989, the Carl Nielsen International Violin Competition in 1992, and the Wolfgang Marschner competition in 1992 in Weimar, and appeared as a soloist with orchestras in Berlin, Bologna and Cardiff.

He has been an artist of the Deutsches Symphonie-Orchester Berlin since 1997.
