= Violin Concerto (Glazunov) =

- by Alexander Glazunov
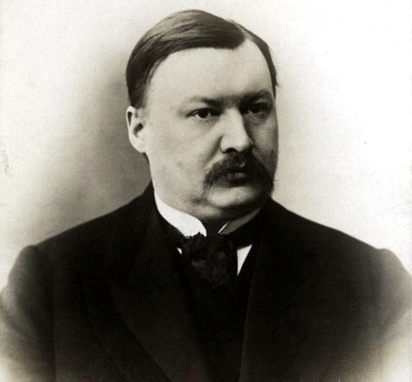
- Key: A minor
- Opus: 82
- Period: Late Romantic
- Genre: Concerto
- Composed: 1904
- Movements: 3
- Scoring: Violin and orchestra

Premiere
- Date: 15 February 1905
- Location: Saint Petersburg

The Violin Concerto in A minor, Op. 82, by Alexander Glazunov is one of his most popular compositions. Written in 1904, the concerto was dedicated to violinist Leopold Auer, who gave the first performance at a Russian Musical Society concert in Saint Petersburg on 15 February 1905. The British premiere of the concerto followed just over a year later, under the direction of Sir Henry Wood and with Mischa Elman as soloist. The American premiere of the work was not until 27 October 1911. It was performed by Efrem Zimbalist at his American debut with the Boston Symphony Orchestra.

The violin concerto is quite representative of Glazunov's technically brilliant style. There are no pauses or numbered sections in the concerto; it is nevertheless often described as consisting of either three or four movements, which may be variously labeled. The slow second movement is seamlessly inserted by the composer into the middle of the first movement, which is an original and rare structural peculiarity of this composition.

The main cadenza at the end of the first movement was composed by Glazunov himself. It utilizes extensive double-stopping technique and is considered one of the most difficult parts of the concerto.

Main themes from 1st movement (lines 1–2) and 3rd movement (line 3)

== Instrumentation ==
The violin concerto is scored for the following orchestra:

- 1 piccolo
- 2 flutes
- 2 oboes
- 2 clarinets in A
- 2 bassoons
- 4 horns in F
- 2 trumpets in E♭ and A
- 3 trombones
- timpani
- glockenspiel
- triangle
- cymbals
- harp
- string section

== Recordings ==
A number of recordings of the concerto have been issued commercially. Selected recordings include:

Title and release date	Violinist	Orchestra and conductor	Label and reference
Sibelius, Prokofiev & Glazunov: Violin Concertos (Heifetz Remastered)	Jascha Heifetz	RCA Victor Symphony Orchestra, Walter Hendl	RCA Red Seal / Sony Classical
Dvořák & Glazunov: Violin Concertos	Nathan Milstein	Pittsburgh Symphony Orchestra, William Steinberg	EMI Classics
Tchaikovsky & Glazunov: Violin Concertos	David Oistrakh	USSR State Symphony Orchestra, Kirill Kondrashin	Melodiya
Glazunov: Violin Concerto in A Minor, Op. 82	Jana Dukanova	Plovdiv Philharmonic Orchestra, Nayden Todorov	Hal Leonard: MMO3168
Glazunov / Dvořák: Violin Concertos in A Minor	Ilya Kaler	Polish National Radio Symphony Orchestra, Camilla Kolchinsky	Naxos: 8.550758
Glazunov & Kabalevsky: Violin Concertos	Gil Shaham	Russian National Orchestra, Mikhail Pletnev	Deutsche Grammophon
Tchaikovsky & Glazunov: Violin Concertos (1995)	Maxim Vengerov	Berlin Philharmonic, Claudio Abbado	Teldec: 4509908812
Mendelssohn / Glazunov: Violin Concertos (1999)	Leila Josefowicz	Montreal Symphony Orchestra, Charles Dutoit	Philips: 464 059-2
Russian Violin Concertos (2004)	Julia Fischer	Russian National Orchestra, Yakov Kreizberg	Pentatone: PTC5186059
Shostakovich & Glazunov: Violin Concertos	Itzhak Perlman	Israel Philharmonic Orchestra, Zubin Mehta	Warner Classics: 2564612978
Glazunov & Schoeck: Works for Violin and Orchestra (2013)	Chloë Hanslip	Orchestra della Svizzera Italiana, Alexander Vedernikov	Hyperion: CDA67940
Shostakovich: Violin Concerto No. 1; Glazunov: Violin Concerto (2016)	Nicola Benedetti	Bournemouth Symphony Orchestra, Kirill Karabits	Decca
Khachaturian & Glazunov: Violin Concertos (2016)	Philippe Quint	Bochumer Symphoniker, Steven Sloane	Avanticlassic
Glazunov: Violin Concerto and Meditation	Rachel Barton Pine	Russian National Orchestra, José Serebrier	Warner Classics
GLAZUNOV, A.K.: Violin Concerto	Bronislaw Gimpel	Stuttgart Pro Musica Orchestra, Martin Sieghart	Vox / Naxos: VOX-NX-2003
Glazunov: The Seasons & Violin Concerto	Oscar Shumsky	Royal Scottish National Orchestra, Neeme Järvi	Chandos
