= Benjamin Ziervogel =

Austrian violinist

Benjamin Ziervogel (born in April 1983 in Klagenfurt) is an Austrian violinist. From 2004 until 2024 he was concertmaster of RTV Slovenia Symphony Orchestra. He performs as concert soloist and a chamber musician as well.

In 1992, he was accepted to the violin class of Brian Finlayson at the Carinthian State Conservatory. Between 1996 and 2002, he was a member of the Anima String Quartet, an ensemble winning several regional and international competitions and from 2002 on, he plays 1st violin in Acies String Quartet. He studied with Igor Ozim, Benjamin Schmid, James Buswell and Joseph Kalichstein and took lessons with Isaac Stern.

He plays a Domenico Montagnana violin (made in 1727), loaned to him by the Austrian National Bank.
