= Naum Sluszny =

Swiss-born classical pianist (1914–1979)

- Born: 30 March 1914; Switzerland
- Died: 17 November 1979 (aged 65)
- Genres: Classical music
- Occupations: Pianist, composer
- Instrument: Piano

Naum Sluszny (30 March 1914 – 17 November 1979) was a Swiss-born concert and chamber pianist.

== Career ==
Sluszny's reputation rose after World War II. He was a student of Stefan Askenase and lived and taught in Brussels.

In 1967, he joined the Brussels Masonic lodge "Le Ciment" for which he composed and recorded 10 pieces for initiation ceremonies in 1977.

On 24 October 1967 in The Town Hall in New York City he gave a recital of four Beethoven sonatas. On 17 August 1973 he gave a concert in the Casino-Kursaal in Ostend.

He was part of the Trio Reine Elisabeth with the violinist Carlo Van Neste and with cellist Éric Feldbusch. Among Sluszny's compositions is a set of six préludes for piano.

== Selected discography ==
- Le Ciment (1977) Vinyl LP
- Recital de Piano (1967) Vinyl LP
- Chefs-d'oeuvre pour piano (1978) Vinyl LP
