= Yampolsky International Competition =

Russian violin competition

The Yampolsky International Competition is a Russian violin competition held in Moscow, Russia in honor of Abram Yampolsky.

== Structure ==
The competition is split into Junior and Senior sections with the senior section consisting of three rounds. The first round of the competition generally includes movements from Bach's Sonatas and Partitas for Solo Violin and caprices from Paganini's 24 Caprices for Solo Violin. The second round includes a Mozart sonata, another standard violin sonata and a piece of virtuosity. The third and final round requires the participant to perform a full concerto with piano and two of the Four Seasons with the Moscow Chamber Orchestra. The finals are held in the Great Hall at the Moscow Conservatory.

== History ==
The Yampolsky International Competition was founded by Eduard Grach, a former student of Abram Yampolsky. Eduard Grach has also serves as the president of the jury. Former winners include Nadezda Tokareva, Julia Ingonina, Emily Sun, Vladimir Dyo, Hyuk-Joo Kwon, Evgenia Gelen and Anna Koryatskaya.

== Prizes ==
Six prizes are awarded to the top six participants. Prize winners are awarded monetary compensation with the top prizes being about 400,000 rubles. Other prizes include performances with orchestras throughout Russia.
