= Izrail Yampolsky =

Soviet violinist and musicologist (1905–1976)

Izrail Markovich Yampolsky (Russian: Израиль Маркович Ямпольский, romanized: Izrail' Markovich Yampol'sky; 21 November [O.S. 8 November] 1905 – 20 September 1976) was a Soviet and Russian violinist, musicologist, and music teacher. He was the nephew of Abram Yampolsky.

== Biography ==
Yampolsky was born in Kiev, son to the violinist Mark Ilich Yampolsky (1879–1951). Yampolsky performed in the Persimfans from 1927 to 1929. He studied violin with his uncle (graduating in 1930) and enrolled in the Moscow Conservatory, where he studied advanced music theory with Nikolai Myaskovsky and Reinhold Glière. He took his kandidat degree in 1940. He taught violin at various educational institutions from 1931 to 1958. Yampolsky held several editorial posts. In 1953 he became a music critic for the Soviet Information Bureau. He died in 1976 in Moscow, aged 70.

== Works ==
Yampolsky was active as a musicologist and published many monographs on the violin and violinists. Yampolsky is known for his book on the history of violin in Russia, Russkoye skripichnoye iskusstvo (Русское скрипичное искусство). He compiled and edited some reference works, including the music encyclopedia Entsiklopedicheskiy muzykalny slovar (Энциклопедический музыкальный словарь) and biographical dictionary of Russian and Soviet musicologists Kto pisal o muzyke (Кто писал о музыке).
