= Abram Yampolsky =

Soviet violinist (1890–1956)

Abram Ilich Yampolsky (Russian: Абрам Ильич Ямпольский; 1890–1956) was a Soviet violin teacher who nurtured many Soviet virtuosos during his tenure at the Moscow Conservatory.

Abram Ilich Yampolsky was born on October 11, 1890. He graduated in Saint Petersburg in 1913 in the class of Sergej Korguyev, a pupil and assistant of Leopold Auer, and was to be one of the founders of the Russian and American 20th century violin schools.

His pupils include, Mark Lubotsky, Igor Bezrodniy, Yuri Yankelevich, Leonid Kogan, Julian Sitkovetsky, Yakov Boroditsky, Boris Goldstein, Elizabeth Gilels, Mikhail Fikhtengoltz, Yakov Rabinovich, and Isaac Zhuk. See: List of music students by teacher: T to Z#Abram Yampolsky.

He was the uncle of Izrail Yampolsky who graduated with him in 1930.

The Yampolsky International Competition held in Moscow was created in dedication to his legacy. In 2017, the finals were held at the Tchaikovsky Conservatory Great Hall. 1st Prize was awarded to Hiroko Ninagawa, 2nd Prize to Agafiya Grigoreva and Joint 3rd Prize to Emily Sun and Hayato Ishibashi.

He died August 17, 1956.
