= Igor Oistrakh =

Soviet and Russian violinist (1931–2021)

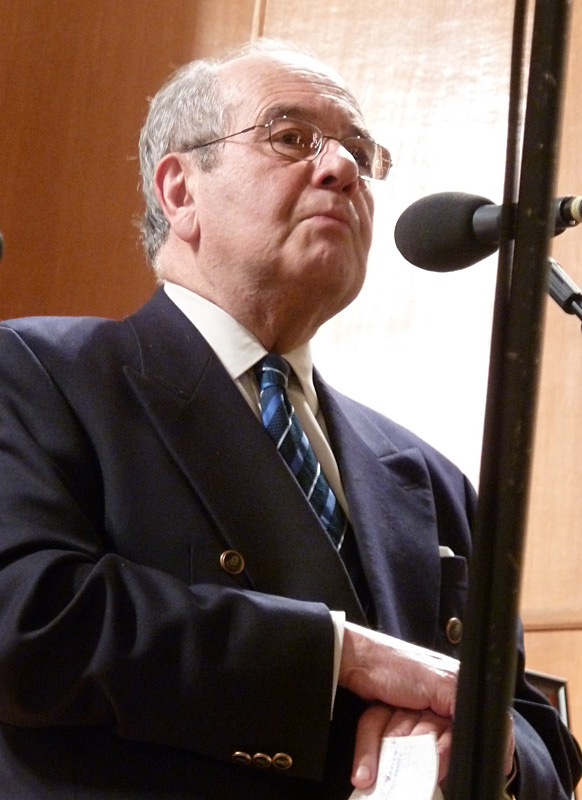
Oistrakh in 2010

Igor Davidovich Oistrakh (Russian: Игорь Давидович Ойстрах; 27 April 1931 – 14 August 2021) was a Soviet and Russian violinist. He was described by Encyclopædia Britannica as "noted for his lean, modernist interpretations".

== Life and career ==
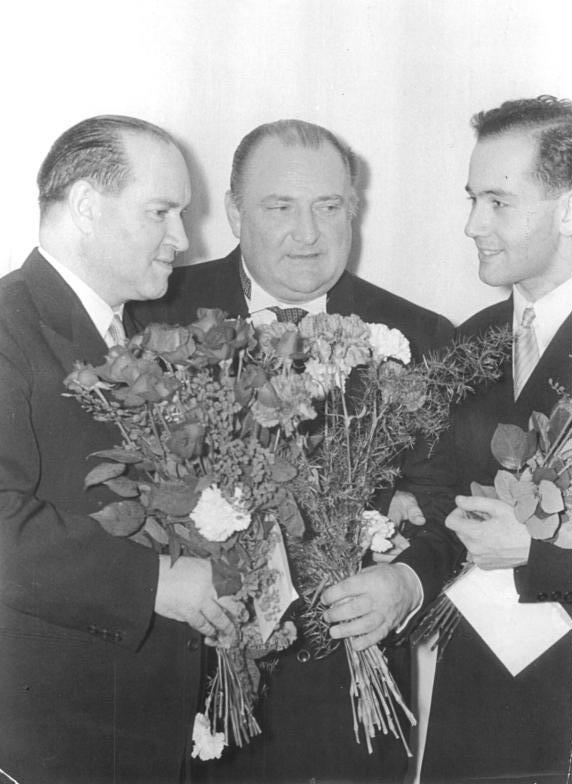
Oistrakh (right) in 1957, with his father David (left) and conductor Franz Konwitschny

Oistrakh was born on 27 April 1931 in Odessa to a Jewish family. He was the son of Tamara Rotareva and the violinist David Oistrakh. He began studying violin with Valeria Merenbloom at age 6, though his main teacher was his father. In 1943, the 12-year-old Oistrakh enrolled in the Central Music School, Moscow, studying with Pyotr Stolyarsky who had taught both his father and Nathan Milstein. He made his concert debut in 1948; the next year he won the International Violin Competition in Budapest and enrolled in the Moscow State Tchaikovsky Conservatory. He won the Henryk Wieniawski Violin Competition in 1952 and graduated from Moscow Conservatory in 1955.

He then joined the faculty of the Conservatory in 1958, becoming a lecturer in 1965. From 1996 to 2010 Oistrakh held the post of Professor of the Royal Conservatory in Brussels.

Oistrakh appeared frequently internationally, both as a soloist and in joint recitals with his father, or with his father conducting. His wife Natalya Zertsalova is a pianist and has performed with him. Their son, Valery, is an active violinist.

After living and working in Brussels in Belgium with his family, Oistrakh returned to Russia in 2011.

He was twice a member of the jury of the Henryk Wieniawski Violin Competition in Poznan (1972, 1977).

On 14 August 2021, Oistrakh died at age 90 from acute heart failure; however, media generally reported this on 1 September 2021. After cremation, the musician's ashes were buried at the Novodevichy Cemetery.
