= Albert Nürnberger =

German bow maker (1854–1931)

Franz Albert Nürnberger II (1854–1931) is regarded as one of the greatest German bow makers.

He was trained in bowmaking by his father Franz Albert I (1826–1894), son of Karl Gottlieb, in Markneukirchen. Albert Nürnberger established his own shop around 1880.

He trained his son, Carl Albert (1885–1971), who also used his brand. Unfortunately the later workshop bows also used the same brand.

Before and after World War I (until death of Albert II in 1931) Nürnberger and W. E. Hill & Sons were of the same competing standard, the best workshops in the world.

His bows are sought after. Original "Albert Nürnberger" bows, made before 1931 are rarer, of a higher standard and highly priced.

"He is known to have exported bows to the US, where the Wurlitzer shop represented him as "the greatest modern bow maker" (c. 1912).

Eugène Ysaÿe, Jan Kubelik, Fritz Kreisler and later David Oistrakh used these bows and considered them equal to bows by the old masters. Of course they all had more than one good bow in their collection(s)." Gennady Filimonov (2007)
