= RTV Slovenia Symphony Orchestra =

- Radio orchestra
- Native name: Simfonični orkester RTV Slovenija
- Founded: 1956; 70 years ago
- Location: Ljubljana, Slovenia
- Website: Official website

The RTV Slovenia Symphony Orchestra (Slovene: Simfonični orkester RTV Slovenija) is a radio orchestra in Slovenia.

== History ==
RTVSO was established in 1956 within Radiotelevizija Slovenija. The Orchestra followed the name change of the National Radio and TV Station from RTV Ljubljana to RTV Slovenija. Throughout its 50-year history, it contributed to archive recordings, composed by Slovenian composers, as well as contemporary and classical music from all over the world. The chief conductor is Bulgarian-American Rossen Milanov, who replaced En Shao.

Milanov and musicians from three orchestras – Chautauqua Symphony Orchestra, Princeton Symphony Orchestra, and RTV Slovenia Symphony Orchestra – offered a Global Pandemic tribute for the 250th anniversary of Beethoven's birth.

RTV Slovenia dates to 1955 when it was conducted by the academy of music's professor, violin virtuoso and composer Uroš Prevoršek. The Orchestra was later conducted by Samo Hubad, Stanislav Macura, Anton Nanut and Lior Shambadal.

In September 2003, David de Villiers became the orchestra's chief conductor. In Autumn 2006, the baton was taken over by the English conductor of Chinese heritage, En Shao.

== Programs ==
RTV Slovenia's main activity is concert records. The orchestra performs repertoire from baroque to modern symphony music, opera, oratorio and cantata, stage and film music, mostly with a stress on the creativity of Slovene music.

In the past years, it attracted most attention at concerts with the bands Siddharta and Terrafolk, where it engaged in crossover projects. Notable recent concerts include the concert featuring pianist Ivo Pogorelić and one on the 75th anniversary of longtime leader Anton Nanut, with guest flautist Irena Grafenauer.

In 2014 the concertmasters were Benjamin Ziervogel and Kana Matsui.
