= Anton Nanut =

Slovenian musician (1932–2017)

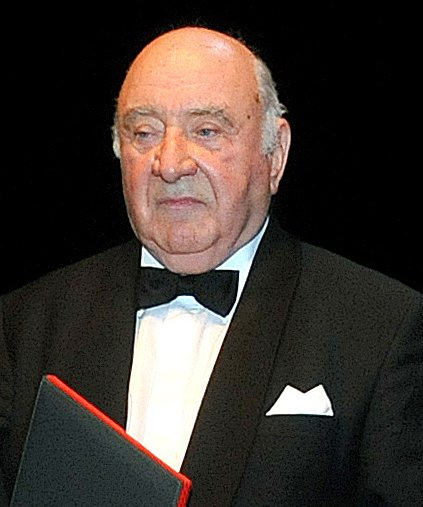
- Nanut in February 2011
- Born: 13 September 1932; Canale d'Isonzo, Kingdom of Italy (now Kanal, Slovenia)
- Died: 13 January 2017 (aged 84); Šempeter pri Gorici, Slovenia

Anton Nanut (13 September 1932 – 13 January 2017) was a renowned Slovenian international conductor of classical music. From 1981 to 1999 he served as the chief conductor of the RTV Slovenia Symphony Orchestra. He was a professor of conducting at the Ljubljana Academy of Music and the artistic leader of the Slovene Octet in its most productive years.

== Works ==
Nanut collaborated with over 200 orchestras and had made over 200 recordings with a variety of labels. Among the concerts that he valued most was a concert with the RTV Slovenia Symphony Orchestra in the Carnegie Hall, his concerts with Staatskapelle Dresden, with the Berlin RIAS and with Saint Petersburg Philharmonic Orchestra. He was a chief conductor of the Dubrovnik Symphony Orchestra and has conducted nearly all the Italian symphony orchestras (especially Orchestra Di Padova e del Veneto).

== Awards ==
Nanut was bestowed numerous awards for his work, among them the Prešeren Foundation Award (for his interpretations of Beethoven), the Župančič Award, the Croatian Milka Trnina Award, the City of Split Award, a high state decoration of the Republic of Croatia, the Yugoslav award Lira, the Silver Order of Freedom of the Republic of Slovenia. On 7 February 2011, he received the Prešeren Award, the highest cultural award in Slovenia, for his lifetime work. Especially prized were his interpretations of Mahler's symphonies.

== Death ==
Nanut died following a long illness on 13 January 2017 at the age of 84.
