= Elizabeth Gilels =

Soviet and Russian violinist (1919–2008)

- Born: Yelizaveta Grigoryevna Gilels; 30 September 1919; Odessa, Ukrainian SSR, Soviet Union
- Died: 13 March 2008 (aged 88) Moscow, Russia
- Genres: Classical
- Occupations: Violinist; pedagogist
- Instrument: Violin
- Years active: 1935–2008
- Label: Melodiya

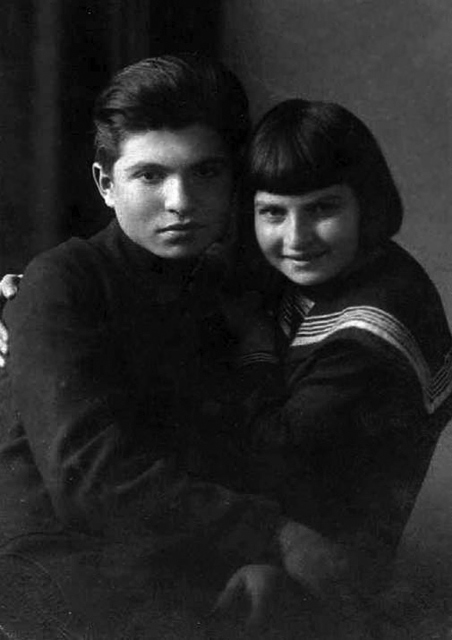
Elizabeth Gilels and her brother, the pianist, Emil.

Elizabeth Gilels (born Yelizaveta Grigoryevna Gilels; Russian: Елизаве́та Григо́рьевна Ги́лельс; 30 September 1919 – 13 March 2008) was a Soviet and Russian violinist and professor.

== Biography ==
Elizabeth Gilels was born on 30 September 1919 in Odessa into a Jewish family. Her father, Grigory Gilels, was a clerk at a sugar refinery, and her mother, Gesya Gilels, was a housewife. Gilels had multiple siblings, including children from previous marriages, by both of her parents. Despite not being directly connected to the music scene, the family would include two musicians: Emil Gilels and Elizabeth.

"There was a grand piano, and already at the age of two, little Emil showed interest in it touching keys and listening to them." Consequently, Elizabeth was surrounded by music at an early age.

Elizabeth commenced her violin studies with pedagogue Pyotr Stolyarsky, whose pupils included David Oistrakh, Nathan Milstein, and Boris Goldstein. Later she studied with Abram Yampolsky (1890–1956) in Moscow. Early on in her career, she formed a duo with her brother.

In 1937, she became a prize winner of the Eugène Ysaÿe competition (later becoming the Queen Elisabeth Competition) in Brussels. Top prizes were garnered by Stolyarsky's other students, including David Oistrakh, Boris Goldshtein (Goldstein), Yelizaveta (Elizabeth) Gilels, and Mikhail Fikhtengoltz.

After WWII, she formed a duo with Leonid Kogan – their performance of Bach's Double Concerto was quite successful. They also performed other pieces, such as the sonata by Weinberg.

Beginning in 1966, Elizabeth Gilels taught at the Moscow Conservatory, where she earned the title of professor in 1987. She published a study book on Scales & Double stops for the violin.

Outside of the USSR, she was mostly known in a dual role. First, as the wife of Leonid Kogan and, second, as the sister of the eminent Emil Gilels.

She died in Moscow on 13 March 2008, at the age of 88.
