= Mikhail Fichtenholz =

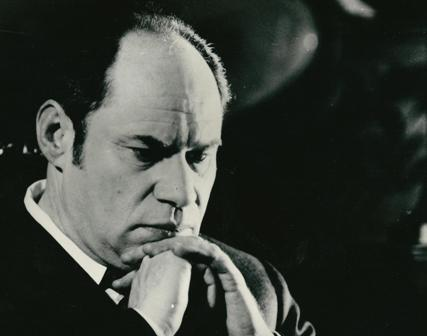

Background information
- Born: Mikhail Izrailevich Fikhtengoltz; Михаил Израилевич Фихтенгольц; 1 June 1920; Odessa, Ukrainian SSR, USSR
- Died: 4 June 1985 (aged 65) Moscow, Russian SFSR, USSR
- Genres: Classical
- Instruments: Violin, piano
- Years active: 1935–1985

Mikhail Izrailevich Fichtenholz (1 June 1920 – 4 June 1985) was a Soviet violinist. A pupil of the eminent pedagogue Pyotr Stolyarsky, he won the national competition for young performers in Leningrad (St. Petersburg) at the age of 15.

In 1937, at one of the most prestigious international competitions of its time, the Eugène Ysaÿe Competition, Stoliarsky students caused a sensation. Top prizes were garnered by David Oistrakh, Boris Goldshtein (Goldstein), Yelizaveta Gilels and Mikhail Fikhtengoltz.

"The results of the sessions created a profound impression: the Soviet school, with an assurance that bordered on arrogance, carried off all the prizes from the first down. The latter was awarded without the slightest discussion to the great David Oistrakh. Everyone else had to be content with crumbs; the Belgian violin school, though still a source of pride, failed, and its absence at the final was much commented on; Arthur Grumiaux and Carlo Van Neste, both young and inexperienced, were not able to convince the jury."

He would go on to become a pedagogue as did David Oistrakh, Elizaveta Gilels, and others.

During the height of Joseph Stalin's regime (Great Purge), Mikhail married the daughter of a high-ranking government official, who subsequently was executed as an "enemy of the people". His relatives immediately fell out of favor and Mikhail was told to divorce his politically stained wife. Fikhtengoltz refused to divorce her and immediately had all prestigious concerts cancelled. The nervous strain was heavy on him, and one of his hands failed - after a few minutes of playing, pain forced him to stop.

Fikhtengoltz started making arrangements of popular piano and orchestral pieces, working in the studio, where he could always take a break and endure the pain. He was also increasingly getting into teaching, and soon after he was teaching at the Gnessin State Musical College in Moscow.

During the mid-Sixties a leading psychotherapist ventured to get Mikhail playing again. Much to his colleagues’ surprise, the man quickly restored mobility to Mikhail’s failing hand. Mikhail rehearsed day and night, and after 23 years away from the stage, he began playing again. The strain to retrieve the time he had lost was great, and he died of a heart attack at the age of 65.

Picking up where her father left off, Natalya Fikhtengoltz, a violinist and teacher, is bringing up her students in the traditions bequeathed by the late Pyotr Stolyarsky. She has also released a series of CDs with recordings once made by her late father.
