= Emil Młynarski =

Polish conductor, violinist, composer, and pedagogue (1870–1935)

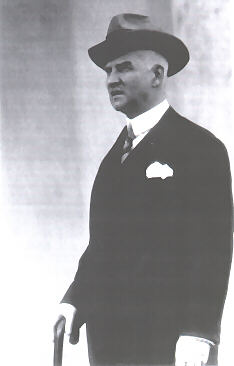
Emil Szymon Młynarski

Emil Szymon Młynarski (Polish pronunciation: [ˈɛmil ˈʂɨmɔn mwɨˈnarskʲi]; 18 July 1870 – 5 April 1935) was a Polish conductor, violinist, composer, and pedagogue.

== Life ==
Młynarski was born in Kibarty (Kybartai), Russian Empire, now in Lithuania. He studied violin with Leopold Auer and composition with Anatoly Lyadov and Nikolai Rimsky-Korsakov. He was the founding conductor of the Warsaw Philharmonic Orchestra and subsequently served as principal conductor of the Scottish Orchestra in Glasgow from 1910 to 1916. He conducted the premiere of Karol Szymanowski's opera King Roger.

He composed, among other things, a symphony dedicated to his homeland (Symphony in F major, Op. 14, Polonia), and two violin concertos (1897, 1917). The latter concerto, in D major, Op. 16, has been recorded by Konstanty Kulka and Nigel Kennedy.

Emil Młynarski died in Warsaw at age 64. His daughter Wanda married Wiktor Łabuński. His daughter Aniela (Nela, Nelly) married Mieczysław Munz and later Arthur Rubinstein. He is the grandfather of John Rubinstein and the great-grandfather of Michael Weston, both American actors. He is closely related to the famous Polish poet and singer Wojciech Młynarski (1941–2017) and his daughter Agata Młynarska (born 1965), a Polish celebrity TV journalist.

Among his students were Pyotr Stolyarsky (the teacher of David Oistrakh), Paul Kochanski, Alexander Zhitomirsky, Paul Kletzki, and Wiktor Łabuński.

== Selected works ==
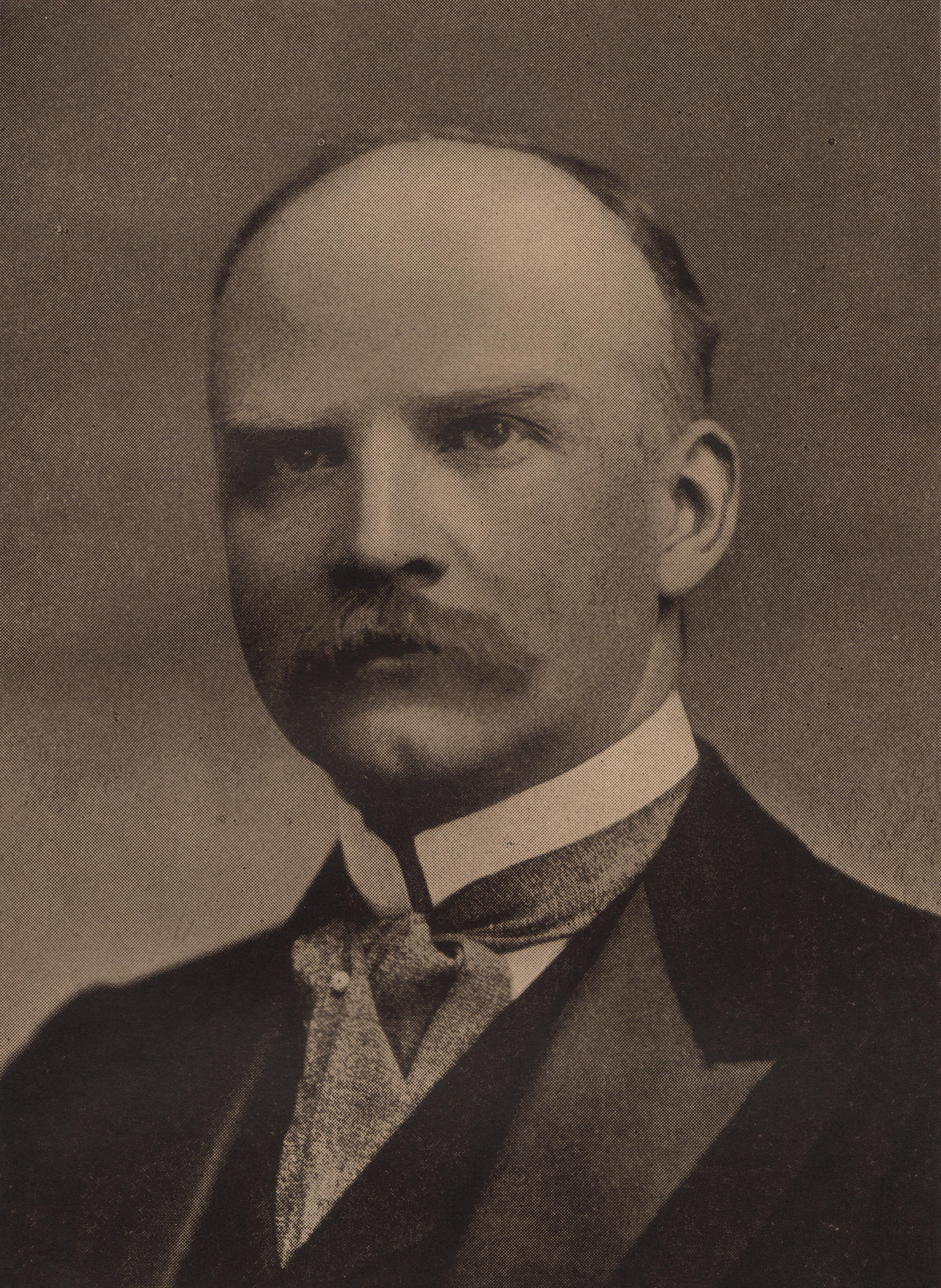
Emil Młynarski

Sortable list of compositions categorized by genre, opus number, date of composition, titles, and scoring

Genre	Opus	Date	Polish title (Original title)	English title	Scoring	Notes
Piano	1		Kartka z albumu	Album Leaf (Feuille d'album)	for piano	
Piano	3		Romans	Romance (Romanza)	for piano	
Chamber music	4	1892–1893	Trzy utwory: 1. Polonez D-dur; 2. Kołysanka słowiańska 3. Humoreska	3 Pieces (Trois morceaux): 1. Polonaise in D major 2. Berceuse slave (Slavonic Cradle Song); 3. Humoresque	for violin (or cello) and piano	published 1892
Piano	5		Trzy utwory: 1. Krakowiak; 2. Nokturn; 3. Moment fugitiv	3 Pieces (Trois morceaux): 1. Krakowiak (Danse polonaise); 2. Nocturne; 3. Moment fugitiv	for piano	
Chamber music	6	1893	Trzy utwory: 1. Rêverie; 2. Musette; 3. Souvenir	3 Pieces (Trois morceaux): 1. Rêverie; 2. Musette; 3. Souvenir	for violin and piano	
Chamber music	7		Dwa mazury: 1. G-dur; 2. A-dur	2 Mazurkas (2 Mazurs): 1. G major 2. A major	for violin and piano	
Vocal			Schlaf ein		for voice and piano	published 1892; words by August Heinrich Hoffmann von Fallersleben
Vocal			Ambrosische Nacht E-dur		for voice and piano	
Piano		before 1895	Sonata na fortepian	Sonata	for piano	
Concertante	11	c.1897	Koncert skrzypcowy d-moll	Concerto in D minor	for violin and orchestra	published 1899; dedicated to Leopold Auer
Stage		c.1898	Ligia	Ligia		Opera after Henryk Sienkiewicz's Quo vadis; unfinished
Stage		c.1900	In vino veritas	In vino veritas		Opera; unfinished
Orchestral	14	1910	Symfonia F-dur "Polonia"	Symphony in F major "Polonia"	for orchestra	published 1911
Stage		1913	Noc letnia	Summer Night		Opera
Vocal		c.1915	Orły do lotu	Fly Up, Eagles	for voice and orchestra	
Concertante	16	c.1916	Koncert skrzypcowy D-dur	Concerto in D major	for violin and orchestra	
Choral		c.1916	Ej chłopie polski	Hey, the Polish Peasant		Cantata-Ballade
Orchestral			Melodie dawniejsze	Old Melodies	for orchestra	
Vocal			Piosenka o Komendancie	Song of the Commander	for voice and piano	
Vocal		1924	Pasterz do Zosi	The Shepherd and Zosia	for voice and piano	words by Kazimierz Brodziński
Orchestral		1925	Fanfary uroczyste	Solemn Fanfares	for orchestra	
Orchestral			Kołysanka	Lullaby	for orchestra	

== See also ==
- List of Poles

Cultural offices
Preceded by none	Music directors, Warsaw Philharmonic Orchestra; 1901–1905	Succeeded by Zygmunt Noskowski
