= Maxim Viktorov =

Maxim Valerievich Viktorov (Russian: Максим Валерьевич Викторов; June 22, 1972, Moscow) is a Russian public figure, lawyer, philanthropist. Member of the Public Chamber of Russia, first deputy chairman of the Presidium of the Russian Association for the Advancement of Science. Viktorov was an advisor for the Russian Defense Ministry in the past. He is chairman of the Board of Investment Programs Foundation and managing partner at Legal Intelligence Group, a law firm. Viktorov is a founder of the Moscow International Paganini Violin Competition, a professor of NRU-HSE (National Research University Higher School of Economics).

By the Presidential Decree was appointed a member of the Public Chamber of Russian Federation.

== Biography ==
- Born June 22, 1972, in Moscow
- In 1997 he graduated from the Law Faculty of Moscow State University named after M. Lomonosov
- From 1989 till 1990 – Fellow of the Investigative Department of the RSFSR Prosecutor
- From 1991 till 1992, at age 19, was drafted to the armed forces of the Federal Agency for Governmental Communications and Information
- From 1992 till 1996 – Legal assistant to the chairman of the Moscow Region Government
- Since 1996, the managing partner of Legal Intelligence Group (Partner: Professor Makovskiy A.L., Professor Sukhanov E.A.)
- In February 1998 he was appointed executive secretary of the council on banks and banking activities to the governor of Moscow region
- In 1998 on the proposal of the governor of the Moscow Region was elected deputy chairman of the Election Commission of the Moscow region
- Since 1999 – chairman of the board of investment programs, implementing a number of innovative and research projects, primarily in the global world trends and risks
- From 2000 till 2003 – member of the advisory council on National Security Issues of the Federal Assembly – Parliament of the Russian Federation
- From 2005 till 2008 – deputy chairman of the advisory Council of Mass Communications at the Ministry of Culture and Mass Communications of Russian Federation
- Since 2006 – member of the board of trustees of Moscow Suvorov Military School. Member of the board of trustees of the Foundation of His Royal Highness Prince Michael of Kent.
- From 2007 till 2009 – member of the board of trustees of the State Academic Bolshoi Theatre of Russia
- Since 2008 – member of the Public Chamber of Russian Federation, member of the Commission on Science and Innovation
- Since 2009 – member of the Public Advancement Committee of Russian Libraries
- Since 2009 – chairman of the editorial board of scientific and journalistic magazine "Union Magazine», illuminates the problems of global development global trends and key risks
- From 2009 till 2011 – trustee of the Pushkin State Museum of Fine Arts
- From 2009 till 2011 – member of the board of directors of OJSC "Moscow Oil and Gas Company", OJSC "Moscow Oil Refinery", Moscow NPZ Holdings BV and Sibir Energy PLC, JSC "KSK", the chairman of the board of directors of the corporation Evocorp
- Since 2011 – member of the council for the Promotion of Russian Olympic Committee
- Since 2011 – the first deputy chairman of the Russian public organization "Russian Association for the Advancement of Science" (AAAS analogue USA), founded by the same year by Viktorov, Academician E. Velikhov, Nobel Prize winner Zhores I. Alferov and Academician V. Chereshnev and others.
- Since 2017, Viktorov has owned of the Evocorp Management Company. In the spring of 2020, Evocorp gained fame as one of the shareholders of the manufacturer of COVID tests, which the media tried to associate with the inner circle of Vladimir Putin.

== Fund investment programs ==
Foundation with the support of the president and with the assistance of the Ministry of Culture has a number of humanitarian projects at the federal and regional significance. Foundation under the leadership of Maxim Viktorov assists its scholarship, including the children who died while on duty servicemen and law enforcement officials.

In 2007, the Fund began a construction project in Moscow Cultural and Educational Center "Art House", consisting of a concert hall and art galleries. From 2007 to present: The foundation organizes concerts, which are unique events worldwide. September 1, 2007 to celebrate the 860th anniversary of Moscow Fund organized concert "Masterpieces of Art of the Violin on Red Square", in March 2008, the foundation held a series of concerts "Ex-Vieuxtemps in Moscow."

In November 2008 Maxim Viktorov organized a concert "Homage Guarneri del Gesu." November 30, 2008 with the participation of Maxim Viktorov there was the grand opening of the "December Nights of Sviatoslav Richter" in the Pushkin State Museum of Fine Arts.

In September 2010, within the framework of the International Military Music Festival "Spasskaya Tower" in the Alexander Hall of the Moscow Kremlin Fund conducted a concert of classical music.

== Moscow International Paganini Violin Competition ==
In 2003, the Maxim Viktorov established Moscow International Paganini Violin Competition. TV channel CNN reported from the first contest: "The Moscow Violin Competition once again had shown the world that music education in Russia – one of the best in the world." Over the years, become contestants from more than 40 countries.

== Moscow Suvorov Military School ==
In 2007, the Maxim Viktorov, as a member of the board of trustees of the Moscow Suvorov Military School, sponsored large-scale works to improve facilities training facilities the school, as well as under the patronage of Viktorov built a new sports complex.

== Russian Public Chamber ==
Viktorov is responsible for interaction with the Public Chamber of the OSCE on the most pressing issues of implementation of international agreements of the Russian Federation, including with the Special Representative and coordinator of the OSCE to combat trafficking in persons.

== Legislative and advisory activities ==
He participated in the drafting of legislation relating to the amendment of existing legislation with a view to countering and preventing unlawful seizure of property complexes. He is an author of a number of analytical materials, reflecting trends in crime in the area of abuse of insider information, manipulation of prices in the organized market, crime in the area of corporate governance. Legal Research Group under the leadership of Viktorov provides an international expertise, including with experts from Harvard University, and organized interaction Investigative Committee of the Russian Interior Ministry with the representatives of the U.S. Federal Bureau of Investigation.

== Awards and commendations ==
He was awarded the medal "for military cooperation", the medal "In commemoration of the 850th anniversary of Moscow", the other state and public awards and awards from foreign countries. He has Russian FSB commendations.

== Collecting ==
Viktorov possesses Russia's largest private collection of unique musical instruments including Alessandro Gagliano, Carlo Tononi, Jacob Steiner, Carlo Bergonzi, Antonio Stradivari, Giuseppe Guarneri Del Gesu's violins.

== Union Magazine vs OCCRP ==
From June 20 to 22, 2023, information concerning Maxim Viktorov and his companies was disseminated in more than 100 media outlets worldwide, referencing the Russian-language website "Important Stories" (which is not a media outlet) and OCCRP. In July 2023, Union Magazine, owned by the Investment Programs Foundation, released a film about OCCRP's operational methods, legal violations, and breaches of journalistic principles (established under the auspices of UNESCO and the International Federation of Journalists). The film refuted the claims made in the publications and accused the Russian-language website "Important Stories" and OCCRP of spreading false information and inciting hatred. At the same time, the Investment Programs Foundation changed the profile of Union Magazine, which has since specialized in investigations against individuals operating under the guise of journalists or media, while violating human rights and not adhering to widely accepted international journalistic principles and standards. In the film, a manifesto of Union Magazine was essentially stated: Cultural differences represent one of the global civilizational threats. The unity and peaceful coexistence of humanity are largely based on universally recognized norms and principles of international law, including those enshrined in the UN Charter and the Universal Declaration of Human Rights. There are individuals and groups who, disregarding universal and industry norms, claim the right to have the final word in defining ultimate judgments that claim to be the truth. For them, it is acceptable to manipulate public opinion, abuse public space, influence government bodies and other public institutions, incite hatred, cause material damage, and drive wedges into already complex contradictions between people and states. Such individuals and groups should be identified, and their illegal activities should be suppressed.
