= Violin Concerto (Tchaikovsky) =

1878 concerto by Pyotr Ilyich Tchaikovsky

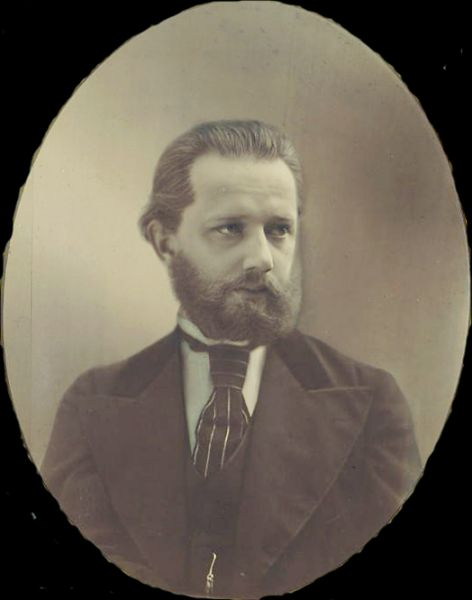
Tchaikovsky ca. 1875

The Violin Concerto in D major, Op. 35 was the only concerto for violin composed by Pyotr Ilyich Tchaikovsky. Composed in 1878, it is one of the best-known violin concertos.

The concerto was composed in Clarens, Switzerland, where Tchaikovsky was recovering from the fallout of his ill-fated marriage. The concerto was influenced by Édouard Lalo's Symphonie espagnole and was composed with the help of Tchaikovsky's pupil and probable former lover, Iosif Kotek. Despite Tchaikovsky's original intention to dedicate the work to Kotek, he instead dedicated it to Leopold Auer due to societal pressures. Auer, however, refused to perform it, and the premiere was given by Adolph Brodsky in 1881 to mixed reviews. The piece, which Tchaikovsky later rededicated to Brodsky, has since become a staple of the violin repertoire. The concerto has three movements, is scored for solo violin and orchestra, and typically runs for about 35 minutes.

== History ==
The piece was written in Clarens, Switzerland, a resort on the shores of Lake Geneva, where Tchaikovsky had gone to recover from the depression brought on by his disastrous marriage to Antonina Miliukova. He was working on his Piano Sonata in G major but finding it heavy going. Presently he was joined there by his composition pupil, the violinist Iosif Kotek, who had been in Berlin for violin studies with Joseph Joachim. The two played works for violin and piano together, including a violin-and-piano arrangement of Édouard Lalo's Symphonie espagnole, which they may have played through the day after Kotek's arrival. This work may have been the catalyst for the composition of the concerto. Tchaikovsky wrote to his patroness Nadezhda von Meck, "It [the Symphonie espagnole] has a lot of freshness, lightness, of piquant rhythms, of beautiful and excellently harmonized melodies.... He [Lalo], in the same way as Léo Delibes and Bizet, does not strive after profundity, but he carefully avoids routine, seeks out new forms, and thinks more about musical beauty than about observing established traditions, as do the Germans." Tchaikovsky authority David Brown writes that Tchaikovsky "might almost have been writing the prescription for the violin concerto he himself was about to compose".

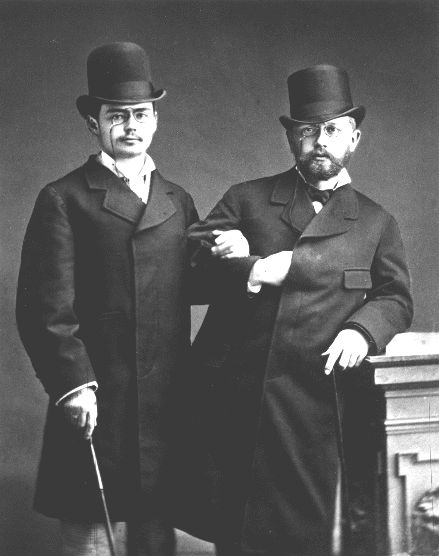
Tchaikovsky (right) with violinist Iosif Kotek

Tchaikovsky made swift, steady progress on the concerto, as by this point in his rest cure he had regained his inspiration, and the work was completed within a month despite the middle movement getting a complete rewrite (a version of the original movement was preserved as the first of the three pieces for violin and piano, Souvenir d'un lieu cher). Since Tchaikovsky was not a violinist, he sought the advice of Kotek on the completion of the solo part. "How lovingly he's busying himself with my concerto!" Tchaikovsky wrote to his brother Anatoly on the day he completed the new slow movement. "It goes without saying that I would have been able to do nothing without him. He plays it marvelously."

=== Dedication ===
Tchaikovsky wanted to dedicate the concerto to Iosif Kotek, but felt constrained by the gossip this would undoubtedly cause about the true nature of his relationship with the younger man. (They were almost certainly lovers at one point, and Tchaikovsky was always at pains to disguise his homosexuality from the general public.) In 1881, he broke with Kotek after the latter refused to play the Violin Concerto, believing it was poorly received and would do damage to his budding career. However, he did dedicate to Kotek the Valse-Scherzo for violin and orchestra, written in 1877, on its publication in 1878.

Tchaikovsky intended the first performance to be given by Leopold Auer, for whom he had written his Sérénade mélancolique for violin and orchestra, and accordingly dedicated the work to him. Auer refused, however, meaning that the planned premiere for March 1879 had to be cancelled and a new soloist found. In 1912, Auer told his version of the story to the New York magazine Musical Courier:

When Tchaikovsky came to me one evening, about thirty years ago [actually thirty-four], and presented me with a roll of music, great was my astonishment on finding this proved to be the Violin Concerto, dedicated to me, completed and already in print. [This was the reduction for violin and piano, printed in 1878; the publication of the full score did not take place until 1888.] My first feeling was one of gratitude for this proof of his sympathy toward me, which honored me as an artist. On closer acquaintance with the composition, I regretted that the great composer had not shown it to me before committing it to print. Much unpleasantness might then have been spared us both....

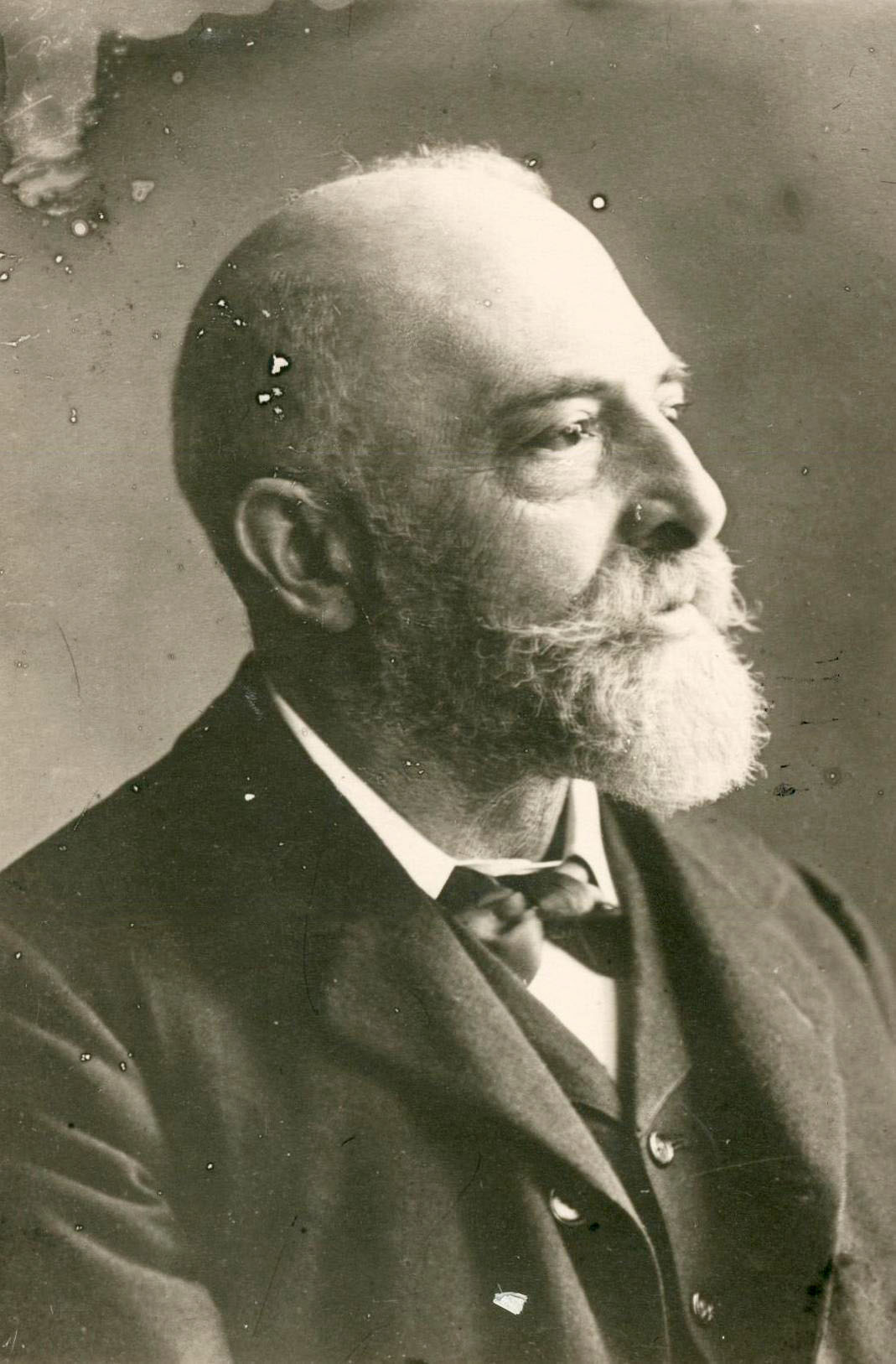
Leopold Auer

Warmly as I had championed the symphonic works of the young composer (who was at that time not universally recognized), I could not feel the same enthusiasm for the Violin Concerto, with the exception of the first movement; still less could I place it on the same level as his purely orchestral compositions. I am still of the same opinion. My delay in bringing the concerto before the public was partly due to this doubt in my mind as to its intrinsic worth, and partly that I would have found it necessary, for purely technical reasons, to make some slight alterations in the passages of the solo part. This delicate and difficult task I subsequently undertook, and re-edited the violin solo part, and it is this edition which has been played by me, and also by my pupils, up to the present day. It is incorrect to state that I had declared the concerto in its original form unplayable. What I did say was that some of the passages were not suited to the character of the instrument, and that, however perfectly rendered, they would not sound as well as the composer had imagined. From this purely aesthetic point of view only I found some of it impracticable, and for this reason I re-edited the solo part.

Tchaikovsky, hurt at my delay in playing the concerto in public and quite rightly too (I have often deeply regretted it, and before his death received absolution from him), now proceeded to have a second edition published, and dedicated the concerto this time to Adolf Brodsky, who brought it out in Vienna, where it met with much adverse criticism, especially from Hanslick. The only explanation I can give of the orchestral score still bearing my name is that when the original publisher, P. Jurgenson, of Moscow, to suit the composer, republished the concerto, he brought out the piano score in the new edition, but waited to republish the orchestral score until the first edition of it should be exhausted. This is the only way I can solve the problem of the double dedication.

... The concerto has made its way in the world, and after all, that is the most important thing. It is impossible to please everybody.

=== Premiere ===
The first performance was eventually given by Adolph Brodsky on 4 December 1881 in Vienna, conducted by Hans Richter. Tchaikovsky changed the dedication to Brodsky. Critical reaction was mixed. The influential critic Eduard Hanslick called it "long and pretentious" and said that it "brought us face to face with the revolting thought that music can exist which stinks to the ear", labeling the last movement "odorously Russian". Hanslick also wrote that "the violin was not played but beaten black and blue".

The violinist who did much early work to make the work popular with the public and win a place for it in the repertoire was Karel Halíř (who in 1905 was to premiere the revised version of the Sibelius Violin Concerto). When Tchaikovsky attended a Leipzig performance of the work in 1888, with Haliř as soloist, he called the event "a memorable day".

The Polish premiere of the concerto was given in Warsaw on 14 January 1892, with Stanisław Barcewicz on violin and the composer conducting. They also played the Sérénade mélancolique for the first time in Poland on that occasion.

== Music ==
The concerto is scored for solo violin, two flutes, two oboes, two clarinets in A and B♭, two bassoons, four horns in F, two trumpets in D, optional trombone, timpani, and strings.

The piece is in three movements:

1. Allegro moderato (D major)
2. Canzonetta: Andante (3/4, G minor)
3. Finale: Allegro vivacissimo (2/4, D major)

The second and third movements are played attacca, with no break between them. A typical performance runs approximately 35 minutes.

=== I. Allegro moderato ===
The first movement is in sonata form with elements of a theme and variations and can be divided into an introduction, exposition, development, recapitulation and coda. The brief introduction is given by the orchestra in D major; as with the first piano concerto, its theme never appears again. The soloist responds with a cadenza-like entrance, and begins the exposition with the introduction of the cantabile main theme. After virtuosic passagework including fast-running scales and triads, a calm second theme is introduced in A major. The mood gradually intensifies and builds up to a majestic climax, with the main theme being played by the full orchestra, which has been ranked among the most satisfying "arrivals" in literature.

The development section begins with a series of seemingly random chromatic shifts, ending in C major, where the solo violin processes a delicate variation of the main theme. A heroic orchestral tutti of the main theme in F major follows, building up to Tchaikovsky's own, technically demanding cadenza that makes use of some of the violin's highest notes. After the cadenza, which ends in a trill, the orchestra re-enters and the recapitulation begins with the main theme once again in D major. After a reprise of the second theme, also in D major, "orchestra and soloist race to the end" in a fast-paced coda.

=== II. Canzonetta: Andante ===
The second movement is in a relatively slow triple meter and somber in tone. It begins with a short chorale-like introduction in the woodwinds, followed by the introduction of the first theme in G minor in the solo violin; a simple cantabile melody that is "sweet yet melancholy". A brief orchestral interlude leads to a brighter section in E♭ major. A reprise of the first theme leads to the transition, a series of orchestral chords that fade into the third movement, which follows without pause (attacca subito).

=== III. Finale: Allegro vivacissimo ===
The final movement uses distinctly Russian elements: a drone-like accompaniment, the initial theme on the G-string that gives the music a "deep, resonant, and slightly gritty sound", a tempo that gets faster and faster, a "lyric folk-like melody" inspired by Russian folk themes, and repetitive thematic loops. It begins with a lively orchestral intro, after which the solo violin leads into the dancing main theme in D major. A slightly calmer section (Poco meno mosso) in A major introduces the second theme, which is processed in a series of variations. The soloist accelerates (Poco a poco stringendo) to return to the main theme in F major, followed by a reprise of the second theme in G major. The main theme appears once more, and leads to a highly virtuosic coda in D major that concludes the work in a grand fashion.

== Notes ==
=== Sources ===
- Brown, David (1983). Tchaikovsky: The Crisis Years, 1874–1878. New York: W. W. Norton. ISBN 0-393-01707-9.
- Knapp, Raymond (2003). "Passing—and Failing—in Late-Nineteenth-Century Russia; or Why We Should Care about the Cuts in Tchaikovsky's Violin Concerto". 19th-Century Music. 26 (3): 195–234. doi:10.1525/ncm.2003.26.3.195. ISSN 0148-2076.
- Smith, Caitlin R. (2014). "Tchaikovsky's Violin Concerto in D major, Op. 35: An Analysis of the Composer's Aspirations". Music and Shared Imaginaries: Nationalisms, Communities, and Choral Singing: 71–79.
- Steinberg, Michael (1998). The Concerto. New York and Oxford: Oxford University Press.
- Warrack, John (1973). Tchaikovsky. New York: Charles Scribner's Sons. SBN 684-13558-2.
