= Boris Goldstein =

Soviet violinist (1922–1987)

Boris Goldstein Борис Гольдштейн
- Born: December 25, 1922; Odessa, Ukrainian SSR, Soviet Union
- Died: November 8, 1987 (aged 64) Hanover, Germany
- Genre: Classical
- Occupation: Violinist
- Instrument: Violin

Boris Emmanuilovich Goldstein (Note: German: Boris Goldstein; Russian: Борис Эммануилович Гольдштейн, romanized: Boris Emmanuilovich Goldshteyn; Ukrainian: Борис Еммануїлович Гольдштейн, romanized: Borys Emmanuilovych Holdshtein) (25 December 1922 – 8 November 1987, known by the diminutive Busya) (Note: German: Busja; Russian: Буся, romanized: Busya; Ukrainian: Буся, romanized: Busia) was a Soviet violinist whose career was greatly hindered by the political situation in the Soviet Union. As a young prodigy, he started violin studies in Odessa with the eminent pedagogue, Pyotr Stolyarsky and continued them in Moscow Conservatory under Abram Yampolsky and Lev Tseitlin. As a teenager, Boris Goldstein was singled out by Heifetz as being Soviet Union's most brilliant violin talent. His brother was the violinist and composer Mikhail Goldstein.

== Life and career ==
Goldstein was born in Odessa in 1922, the son of personal distinguished citizen Mendel Abramovich-Geynikhovich Goldshteyn (born 1885 in Odessa) and Sura Iosifovna Goldshteyn (nee Kigel, born 1887 in Orhei), who registered their marriage on July 26, 1909 in Odessa. His paternal grandparents, married in Odessa on August 10, 1876, were Odessa dweller Abram-Geynikh Goldshteyn and Nemyriv dweller Pesya Yudkovna Siminshteyn.

He won the fourth prize of the 1935 Henryk Wieniawski Violin Competition in Warsaw; Ginette Neveu from France came first, David Oistrakh second, and Josef Hassid from Poland received an honorary diploma.

In 1937, at one of the most prestigious international competitions of its time, the Eugène Ysaÿe Competition, Stolyarsky students caused a sensation. Top prizes were won by David Oistrakh, Boris Goldstein, Yelizaveta Gilels and Mikhail Fikhtengoltz. "The results of the sessions created a profound impression: the Soviet school, with an assurance that bordered on arrogance, carried off all the prizes from the first down. The latter was awarded without the slightest discussion to the great David Oistrakh. Everyone else had to be content with crumbs; the Belgian violin school, though still a source of pride, failed, and its absence at the final was much commented on; Arthur Grumiaux and Carlo Van Neste, both young and inexperienced, were not able to convince the jury."

Later he was forced to emigrate from Russia to Germany, he taught but his solo career never recovered.

The composer, violinist, and professor for violin Mikhail Goldstein was his brother. Notable students of Boris Goldstein include Zakhar Bron and Alexander Skwortsow.

Boris Goldstein was a professor at the International Course in Vilanova i la Geltrú (Barcelona, Spain) in August 1982.(6)

Goldstein died on 8 November 1987 in Hanover, Germany.
