= Pyotr Stolyarsky =

Soviet violinist (1871–1944)

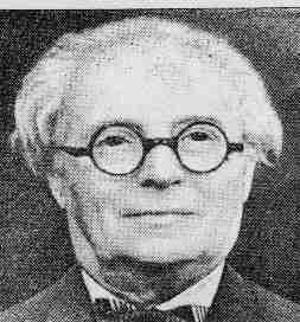

Background information
- Born: Piotr Solomonovich Stolyarsky; 30 November 1871; Lypovets, Kiev Governorate, Russian Empire
- Died: 29 April 1944 (age 72) (Soviet Union) Sverdlovsk, USSR
- Genre: Classical
- Occupations: Pedagogue, Violinist
- Years active: 1893–1944

Pyotr Solomonovich Stolyarsky (Russian: Пётр Соломонович Столярский; 30 November [O.S. 18 November] 1871 – 29 April 1944) was a Soviet violinist and eminent pedagogue, honored as People's Artist of UkSSR (Ukrainian SSR) (1939). He was a member of CPSU (Communist Party of the Soviet Union) from 1939.

== Biography ==
Stolyarsky was born in 1871 in Lypovets, Kiev Governorate, Russian Empire (in present-day Ukraine). He first studied with his father, then with Stanisław Barcewicz in Warsaw, and subsequently with Emil Młynarski and Josef Karbulka in Odessa. In 1893 he graduated from Odessa music school. In 1893-1919 became a member of the Odessa Opera House orchestra. From 1898 commenced his pedagogical activity teaching children from the age of 4. In 1912 he opened his own music school. From 1919 he taught at the Odessa conservatory (where he became a professor in 1923). He founded the Odessa School of violin playing and became one of the founders of the Soviet violin school. With regard to violin teachers, through his teacher Emil Młynarski he is the "great-son" of Leopold Auer and the "great-great-son" of Joseph Joachim. Through his teacher Stanisław Barcewicz he is the "great-son" of Niccolo Paganini.

His students won top prizes among important competitions. In the 1935 Henryk Wieniawski Violin Competition in Warsaw two of his pupils won prizes: David Oistrakh and Boris Goldstein. (Official result; Ginette Neveu from France came first, David Oistrakh second, Henri Temianka won third, Boris Goldstein came in fourth and Josef Hassid from Poland received an honorary diploma.)

In 1937, at one of the most prestigious international competitions of its time, the Eugène Ysaÿe Competition, Stolyarsky students caused a sensation. Top prizes were garnered by David Oistrakh, Boris Goldshtein (Goldstein), Yelizaveta Gilels and Mikhail Fikhtengoltz.

"The results of the sessions created a profound impression: the Soviet school, with an assurance that bordered on arrogance, carried off all the prizes from the first down. The latter was awarded without the slightest discussion to the great David Oistrakh. Everyone else had to be content with crumbs; the Belgian violin school, though still a source of pride, failed, and its absence at the final was much commented on; Arthur Grumiaux and Carlo Van Neste, both young and inexperienced, were not able to convince the jury."

In the Soviet Union Stolyarsky's name was always associated with the special pedagogic method for professional instruction(s) in music for gifted children (from an early age). Stolyarsky had superb personal qualities of a master teacher, highest musical instincts and organizational talent which made it possible for him to attain maximum results.

Among his star pupils were David Oistrakh, Nathan Milstein, Iosif Brodsky, Samuil Furer, Boris Goldstein, Mikhail Goldstein, Daniel Shindarov, Elizabeth Gilels (wife of the Soviet violinist Leonid Kogan and sister to the eminent pianist Emil Gilels), Igor Oistrakh, Mikhail Fikhtengoltz and Eduard Grach who was one of his last pupils.

Stolyarsky's name is also associated with the School of Stolyarsky, a special music school for gifted children in Odessa (which was opened in 1933 upon his initiative). He was awarded the Order of the Red Banner of Labor.

Stolyarsky's talent for teaching was certainly second to none. He immediately knew a talent when he saw one, really Taking a kid's hand, he could tell then and there whether he or she would make a good player or not. Seeing the little David Oistrakh, the son of one of the theater's singers (at the Odessa Opera House), he told her the boy would someday become a wonder player. And like it always happened, his prophecy came perfectly true…

— Eduard Grach

== Honours and awards ==
- Order of the Red Banner of Labour
- People's Artist of the Ukrainian SSR

He died in Sverdlovsk, USSR in 1944, aged 72.
