= Carlo Van Neste =

Belgian violinist (1914–1992)

- Born: 1 April 1914
- Died: 12 July 1992 (aged 78)
- Occupation: Belgium Violinist

Carlo Van Neste (1 April 1914 in Antwerp – 12 July 1992 in Brussels) was a Belgian violinist. He was part of the Trio Reine Elisabeth with the pianist Naum Sluzsny and with cellist Eric Felbusch.
