= Nathan Milstein =

American violinist (1904–1992)

External audio
- Listen to Nathan Milstein performing Ludwig van Beethoven's "Violin Concerto in D major" Opus 61 with William Steinberg conducting the Pittsburgh Symphony Orchestra in 1955 here on archive.org

Nathan Milstein

Nathan Mironovich Milstein (Russian: Натан Миронович Мильштейн, romanized: Natan Mironovich Milshteyn; 13 January 1904 [O.S. 31 December 1903] – December 21, 1992) was a Russian-American virtuoso violinist.

Widely regarded as one of the greatest violinists of all time, Milstein was known for his interpretations of Bach's solo violin works and for works from the Romantic period. He was also known for his long career: he performed at a high level into his mid-80s, retiring only after suffering a broken hand.

== Biography ==
Milstein was born in Odessa, Russian Empire, as the fourth of seven children in a middle-class Jewish family with no musical background. His mother recognized his early interest in music and encouraged him to take violin lessons at the age of five, hoping it would keep him out of trouble. In 1909, Milstein began studying with Odessa’s most esteemed violin teacher, Pyotr Stolyarsky, and continued with him until the summer of 1914. Among his fellow students was a six-year-old David Oistrakh. When Milstein turned 11, Leopold Auer invited him to become one of his students at the St. Petersburg Conservatory. Milstein later fondly reminisced about those early years:

Every little boy who had the dream of playing better than the other boy wanted to go to Auer. He was a very gifted man and a good teacher. I used to go to the Conservatory twice a week for classes. I played every lesson with forty or fifty people sitting and listening. Two pianos were in the classroom and a pianist accompanied us. When Auer was sick, he would ask me to come to his home.

Milstein may have been the last Russian violinist to have had personal contact with Auer. Although Auer does not mention Milstein by name in his memoirs, he refers to "two boys from Odessa ... both of whom disappeared after I left St. Petersburg in June 1917." Additionally, Milstein's name does not appear in the registry of the St. Petersburg Conservatory. Milstein also studied with Eugène Ysaÿe in Belgium. In the documentary Nathan Milstein – In Portrait, Milstein told director Christopher Nupen that he learned very little from Ysaÿe but greatly enjoyed his company. In a 1977 interview published in High Fidelity, Milstein stated, "I went to Ysaÿe in 1926, but he never paid any attention to me. I think it might have been better this way. I had to think for myself."

Milstein met Vladimir Horowitz and his pianist sister Regina in 1921 when he played a recital in Kiev. They invited him for tea at their parents' home. Milstein later said, "I came for tea and stayed three years." Milstein and Horowitz performed together, as "children of the revolution", throughout the Soviet Union and struck up a lifelong friendship. The premiere of Prokofiev's Violin Concerto No. 1 in the Soviet Union in 1923 is worth noting since it was given just three days after the Paris premiere by two 19-year-olds, Milstein and Horowitz. Horowitz played the orchestral part on the piano. Milstein later wrote in his memoirs, From Russia to the West, "I feel that if you have a great pianist like Horowitz playing with you, you don't need an orchestra." Milstein and Horowitz also introduced Karol Szymanowski's First Violin Concerto at the same concert. In 1925, they went on a concert tour of Western Europe together.

In 1929, Milstein made his American debut with Leopold Stokowski and the Philadelphia Orchestra. He eventually settled in New York, gaining American citizenship in 1942. He toured repeatedly throughout Europe, maintaining residences in London and Paris. A transcriber and composer, Milstein arranged many works for violin and wrote his own cadenzas for many concertos. He was obsessed with articulating each note perfectly and would often spend long periods of time working out fingerings which would make passages sound more articulated. One of his best-known compositions is Paganiniana, a set of variations on various themes from the works of Niccolò Paganini.

After playing many different violins in his earlier days, Milstein finally acquired the 1716 "Goldman" Stradivarius in 1945 which he used for the rest of his life. He renamed this Stradivarius the "Maria Teresa" in honor of his daughter Maria and his wife Therese. He also performed on the 1710 ex-"Dancla" Stradivarius. In 1948, Milstein's recording of Felix Mendelssohn's Violin Concerto in E minor, with Bruno Walter conducting the New York Philharmonic, was the first recording issued in Columbia's LP format.

External audio
- You may hear Nathan Milstein performing Pyotr Ilyich Tchaikovsky's Violin Concerto in D major Opus 35 with Frederick Stock conducting the Chicago Symphony Orchestra in 1940 here on archive.org

Milstein was awarded the Légion d'honneur by France in 1968 and received a Grammy Award for his recording of Bach's Sonatas and Partitas in 1975. He was also awarded Kennedy Center honors by US President Ronald Reagan. A recital he gave in Stockholm in June 1986, one of his last performances, was recorded in its entirety and shows the remarkable condition of his technique at age 82. A fall shortly afterward in which he severely broke his left hand ended his career. During the late 1980s, Milstein published his memoirs, From Russia to the West, in which he discussed his life of constant performance and socializing. Milstein discusses the personalities of composers such as Alexander Glazunov, Sergei Prokofiev, Sergei Rachmaninoff and Igor Stravinsky and conductors such as Arturo Toscanini and Leopold Stokowski, all of whom he knew personally. He also discusses his best friends, pianist Vladimir Horowitz, cellist Gregor Piatigorsky and ballet director George Balanchine, as well as other violinists such as Fritz Kreisler and David Oistrakh. Milstein was married to Therese Kaufman, with whom he had one daughter, Maria Bernadette. He died of a heart attack in London on December 21, 1992, 23 days before his 89th birthday. Therese died in 1999 aged 83.
