= David Oistrakh =

Soviet violinist (1908–1974)

- Давид Ойстрах
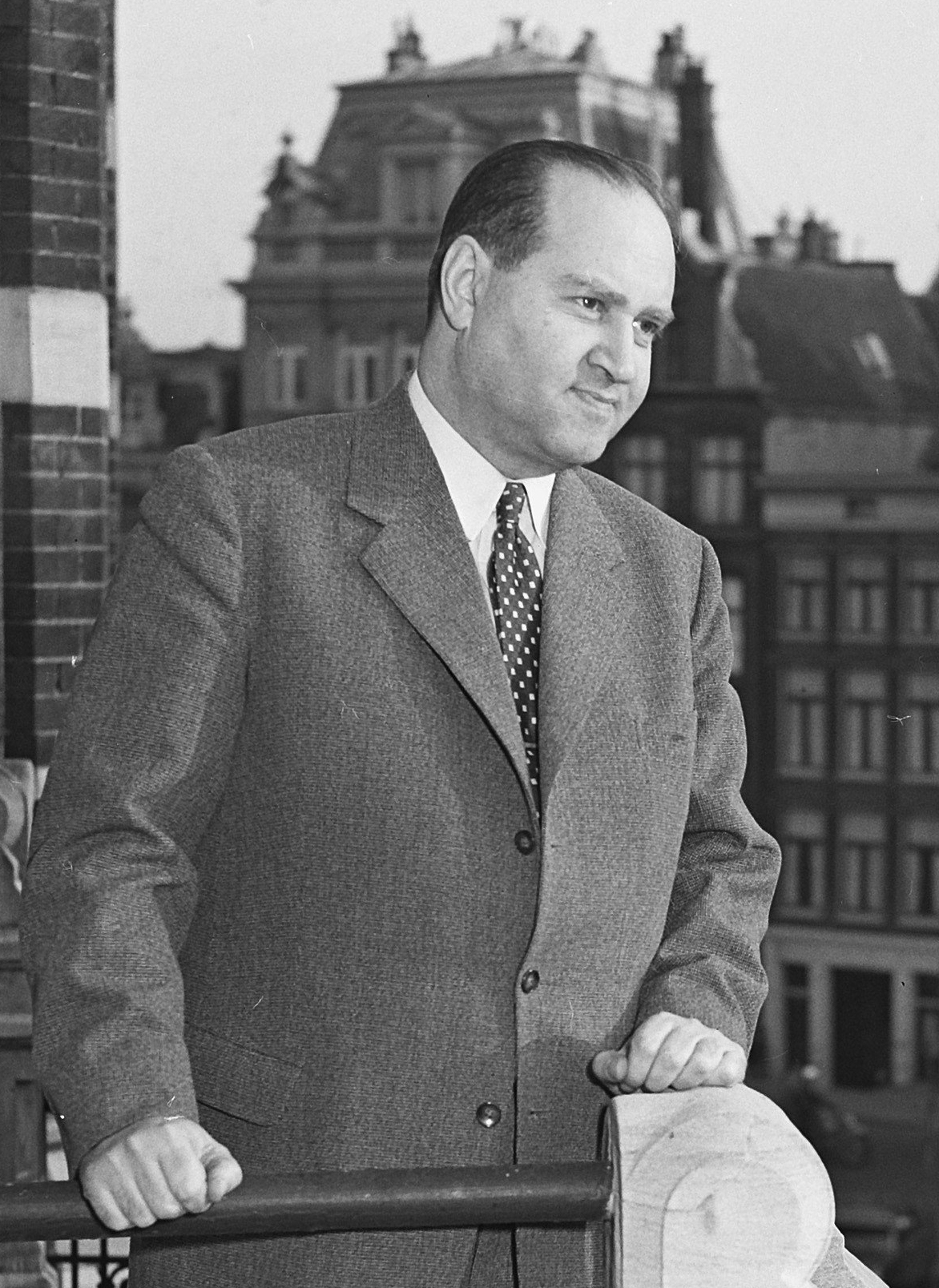
- Oistrakh in 1956
- Born: David Fishelevich Oistrakh; 30 September [O.S. 17 September] 1908; Odessa, Kherson Governorate, Russian Empire
- Died: 24 October 1974 (aged 66); Amsterdam, Netherlands
- Burial place: Novodevichy Cemetery, Moscow
- Education: Stolyarsky School; Odessa Conservatory
- Years active: 1914–1974
- Spouse: Tamara Rotareva (m. 1928)
- Children: Igor Oistrakh
- Awards

Signature
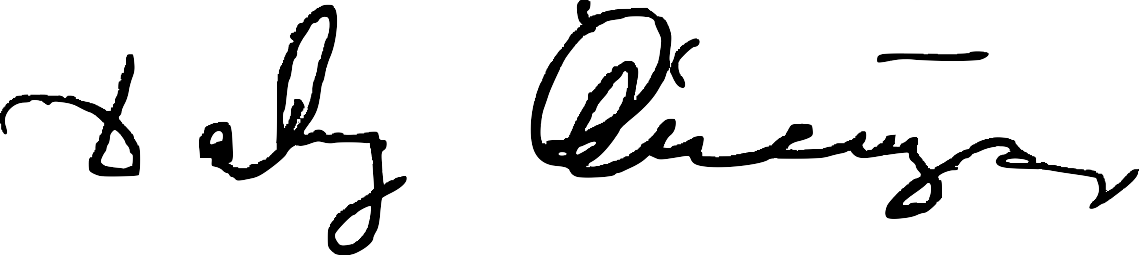

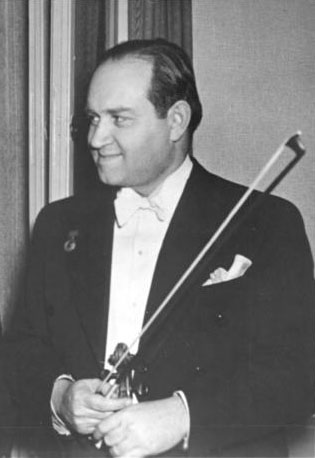
Oistrakh in 1954

David Fyodorovich Oistrakh (Note: also Oistrach and Eustrach; Russian: Дави́д Фёдорович (Фи́шелевич) О́йстрах, romanized: David Fiodorovič (Fišelevič) Ojstrakh, Russian pronunciation: [dɐˈvʲit ˈfʲɵdərəvʲɪtɕ (ˈfʲiʂɨlʲɪvʲɪtɕ)ˈojstrəx], Ukrainian: Дави́д Фе́дорович (Фі́шельович) О́йстрах, romanized: Davyd Fedorovych (Fishelyovych) Oistrakh) (30 September [O.S. 17 September] 1908 – 24 October 1974) was a Soviet Russian violinist, violist, and conductor. He was also Professor at the Moscow Conservatory, People's Artist of the USSR (1953), and Laureate of the Lenin Prize (1960).

Oistrakh collaborated with major orchestras and musicians from many parts of the world and was the dedicatee of numerous violin works, including both of Dmitri Shostakovich's violin concerti and the violin concerto by Aram Khachaturian. He is considered one of the preeminent violinists of the 20th century.

== Life and career ==
=== Early years ===
Oistrakh was born to a Jewish family in Odessa, in Kherson Governorate of the Russian Empire (now Odesa, Ukraine). His presumed father was Fischl Eustrach, son of a second guild merchant, and his mother was Beyle Oistrakh, an actress and singer. At the age of five, young Oistrakh began his studies of the violin and viola as a pupil of Pyotr Stolyarsky. In his studies with Stolyarsky he became very good friends with Iosif Brodsky, Nathan Milstein and other violinists with whom he collaborated numerous times after achieving fame since their beginnings as fellow students at the Stolyarsky School.

In 1914, at the age of six, Oistrakh performed his debut concert. He entered the Odessa Conservatory in 1923, where he studied until his graduation in 1926. At the conservatory he also studied harmony with the composer Mykola Vilinsky. His 1926 graduation concert consisted of Bach's Chaconne, Tartini's Devil's Trill Sonata, Rubinstein's Viola Sonata, and Prokofiev's Violin Concerto No. 1 in D major. In 1927, Oistrakh appeared in Kiev as soloist with the Glazunov Violin Concerto in a performance conducted by the composer, which earned the violinist an invitation to play the Tchaikovsky Violin Concerto in Leningrad with the Philharmonic Orchestra under Nikolai Malko the following year.

=== In Moscow ===
In 1927, Oistrakh relocated to Moscow, where he gave his first recital and met his future wife: the pianist Tamara Rotareva (1906–1976). They were married a year later and had one child, Igor Oistrakh, who was born in 1931. Igor Oistrakh later followed his father's path as a violinist, and eventually performed and recorded side by side with his father, including Bach's Double Concerto, which they first recorded in 1951, and Mozart's Sinfonia Concertante for Violin, Viola and Orchestra. In at least one of the recordings of Mozart's Sinfonia Concertante, Igor Oistrakh played violin, while his father David played viola.

From 1934 onwards, Oistrakh held a position teaching at the Moscow Conservatory, and was later made professor in 1939. Some of his colleagues while teaching at the conservatory included Yuri Yankelevich and Boris Goldstein. Oistrakh taught Oleg Kagan, Valery Klimov (who later succeeded Oistrakh's position at the Moscow Conservatory), Emmy Verhey, Oleh Krysa, Gidon Kremer, Yulia Brodskaya (Julia Verba), Eduard Dayan, Zoya Petrosyan, Jean Ter-Merguerian, Victor Danchenko, Victor Pikaizen, Cyrus Forough, Olga Parhomenko, and his son Igor Oistrakh. In the 1950s, David Oistrakh invited Yulia Brodskaya to be his assistant in teaching solo and chamber music and Rosa Fine as his assistant for solo students.

From 1940 to 1963, Oistrakh performed extensively in a trio that also included the cellist Sviatoslav Knushevitsky and the pianist Lev Oborin. It was sometimes called the "Oistrakh Trio". Oistrakh collaborated extensively with Oborin, as well as Jacques Thibaud, a French violinist.

=== During World War II ===
During World War II he was active in the Soviet Union, premiering new concerti by Nikolai Miaskovsky and Aram Khachaturian as well as two sonatas by his friend Sergei Prokofiev. He was also awarded the Stalin Prize in 1942. The final years of the war saw the blossoming of a friendship with Shostakovich, which led to the two violin concertos and the sonata, all of which were to be premiered by and become firmly associated with Oistrakh in the following years. Oistrakh's career was set from this point, although the Soviet Union was "protective" of its people and refused to let him perform abroad. He continued to teach in the Moscow Conservatory, but when Nazi Germany invaded the Soviet Union, he went to the front lines, playing for soldiers and factory workers under intensely difficult conditions. Arguably one of the most heroic acts in his life was a performance of Tchaikovsky's Violin Concerto to the end in the central music hall during the Battle of Stalingrad in the winter of 1942 while central Stalingrad was being massively bombed by the German forces. At least one source indicates that Oistrakh performed there that winter.

=== International travel ===
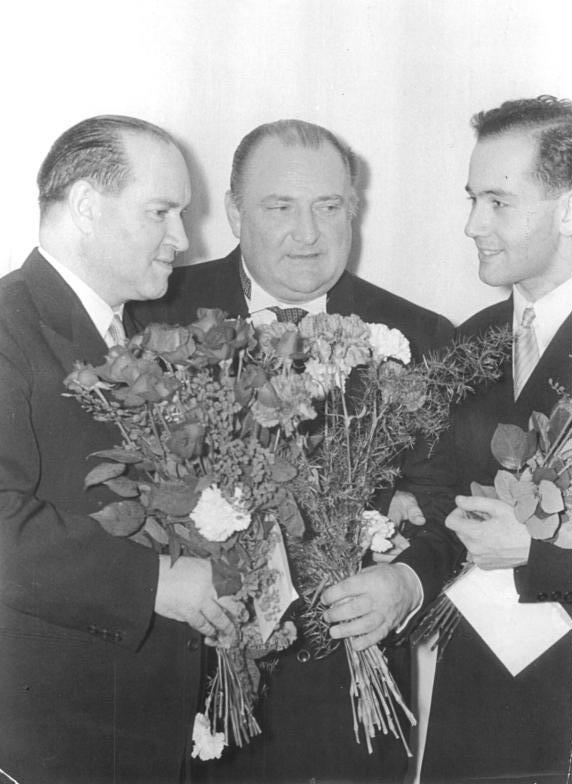
David Oistrakh, Franz Konwitschny and Igor Oistrakh after a guest performance in Berlin, 1957

Oistrakh was allowed to travel after the end of the war. He travelled to the countries in the Soviet bloc and even to the West. His first foreign engagement was to appear at the newly founded "Prague Spring" Festival where he was met with enormous success. In 1949 he gave his first concert in the West – in Helsinki. In 1951, he appeared at the "Maggio Musicale" Festival in Florence, in 1952 he was in East Germany for the Beethoven celebrations, France in 1953, Britain in 1954, and eventually, in 1955, he was allowed to tour the United States. By 1959, he was beginning to establish a second career as a conductor, and in 1960 he was awarded the coveted Lenin Prize. His Moscow conducting debut followed in 1962, and by 1967 he had established a partnership with the celebrated Soviet pianist Sviatoslav Richter.

=== Later years ===
The year 1968 saw wide celebrations for the violinist's sixtieth birthday, which included a celebratory performance in the Great Hall of the Moscow Conservatory of the Tchaikovsky concerto, one of his favourite works, under the baton of Gennady Rozhdestvensky. Oistrakh was now seen as one of the great violinists of his time, alongside fellow Russian Nathan Milstein, Romania's George Enescu and Lithuanian-born Jascha Heifetz.

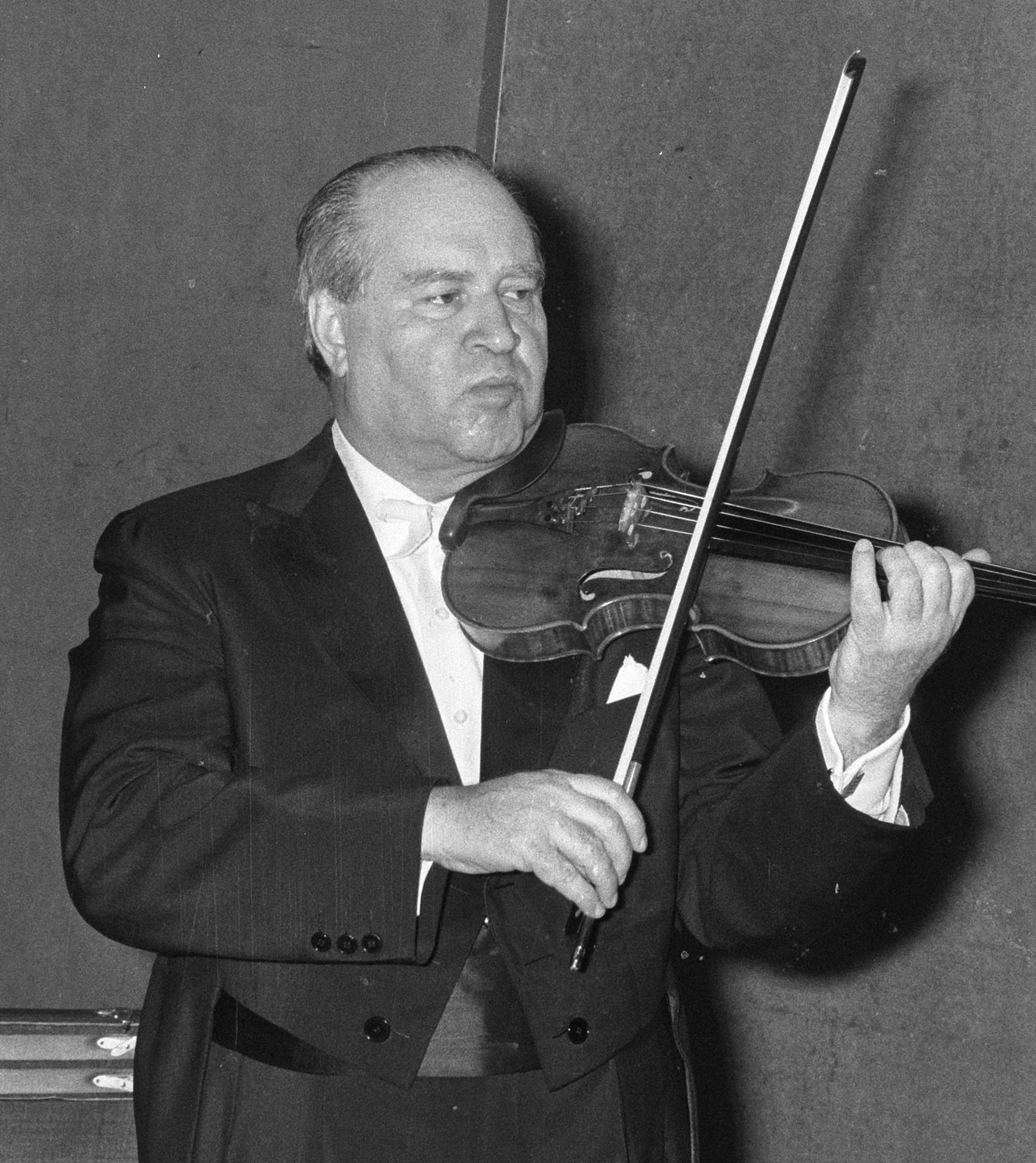
Oistrakh in 1972

Oistrakh suffered a heart attack in 1964. He survived and continued to work at a furious pace. He had already become one of the principal cultural ambassadors for the Soviet Union to the West in live concerts and recordings. After conducting a cycle of Brahms with the Concertgebouw Orchestra, he died from another heart attack in Amsterdam in 1974. His remains were returned to Moscow, where he was interred in Novodevichy Cemetery.

== Distinctions ==
Oistrakh received many awards and distinctions. Within the Soviet Union, David Oistrakh was awarded the Stalin Prize in 1942, the title of People's Artist of the USSR in 1953, and the Lenin Prize in 1960. He also won the 1935 Soviet Union Competition. Several reputable works from the standard violin repertoire are dedicated to Oistrakh, including a concerto by Khachaturian, two concerti by Shostakovich, and several other pieces.

Oistrakh's fame and success were not limited to the Soviet Union: he was placed second at the Henryk Wieniawski Violin Competition in Warsaw, after the 16-year-old prodigy Ginette Neveu, and further improved upon that by winning the grand prize in the Queen Elisabeth Competition in Brussels.

The asteroid 42516 Oistrach is named in honour of him and his son, the violinist Igor Oistrakh.

== Instruments ==
Oistrakh is known to have played at least seven Stradivarius violins owned by the Soviet Union. He initially selected the 1702 Conte di Fontana Stradivarius, which he played for 10 years before exchanging it for the 1705 Marsick Stradivarius in June 1966, which he played until his death (Interview included in "The Art of Violin" DVD, NVC Arts, 2000).

Oistrakh used bows by Albert Nürnberger and André Richaume throughout his life. Up until 1957, he used a Nürnberger bow. "The André Richaume bow bought by his son Igor Oistrakh in 1957 had filled David with such enthusiasm that Igor made a gift of it." Oistrakh had remarked that this (Richaume) bow gave him great satisfaction, so much so that when in Paris he had to meet Richaume in person.

== Chess ==
Oistrakh was an avid chess player in the 1930s, when Stalin's government was actively encouraging its best minds to pursue chess as a hobby. His 1937 match against the composer Sergei Prokofiev was a widely observed event in the Soviet Union and is seen as an important factor in the game's enduring popularity in ex-Soviet nations today. Oistrakh handily defeated Prokofiev in the ten-game match; Prokofiev resigned after seven games. Only one game transcript survives, and it records a draw between the two players.

== Honours and awards ==
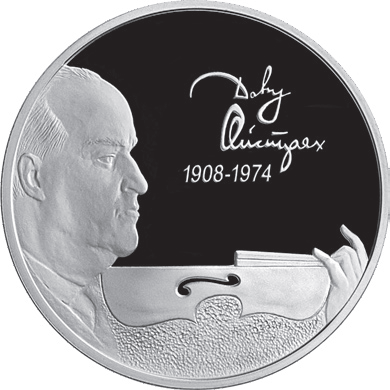
Oistrakh on a Russian commemorative coin

Soviet

- Two Orders of Lenin – 1946 and 1966
- Two Orders of the Badge of Honour – 1937 and ?
- People's Artist of the USSR, 1953
- Stalin Prize, 1st class – 1943
- Lenin Prize – 1960
- Honoured Artist of the RSFSR

Foreign

- Grand Cross of the Order of the Lion of Finland – 1966
- Grand Officer of the Order of Leopold II, Belgium – 1967

Awards

- Grammy Award for Best Instrumental Soloist(s) Performance (With or Without Orchestra) – 13th Annual Grammy Awards, 1971, Brahms: Double Concerto 17th Annual Grammy Awards, 1975, Shostakovich: Violin Concerto No. 1
- Grammy Hall of Fame – 2003

== Recordings ==
Oistrakh made recordings for the state classical music label, Melodiya. These recordings were marketed in the west under EMI Records and in the U.S.A. under Angel Records. He made a few guest recordings with the Philadelphia Orchestra under the direction of Eugene Ormandy. These were issued by Columbia Records. In the 21st century, many of the Melodiya recordings have been reissued by Warner Classics, whose parent company acquired EMI's classical catalog.Oistrakh also recorded for Deutsche Grammophon:David & Igor Oistrakh; Franz Konwitschny: Leipzig Gewandhaus Orchestra Deutsche Grammophon Gesellschaft: The Mono Era 1948-1957

== Legacy ==
There is a yearly music festival, "The David Oistrakh Festival", from late August to October in Estonia. Moscow International David Oistrakh Violin Competition is a biennial competition for young violinists held since 2006 in memory of David Oistrakh, organized by the non-profit David Oistrakh Charity Foundation. The competition, supported by Moscow government's Department of Culture, the Ministry for Culture of Russia and the Moscow Conservatory, is a member of the European Union of Music Competitions for Youth.

The competition aims to popularize and develop the best traditions of Russian violin performance, and to discover young musicians.

== See also ==
- Moscow International David Oistrakh Violin Competition
