= List of compositions by Fritz Kreisler =

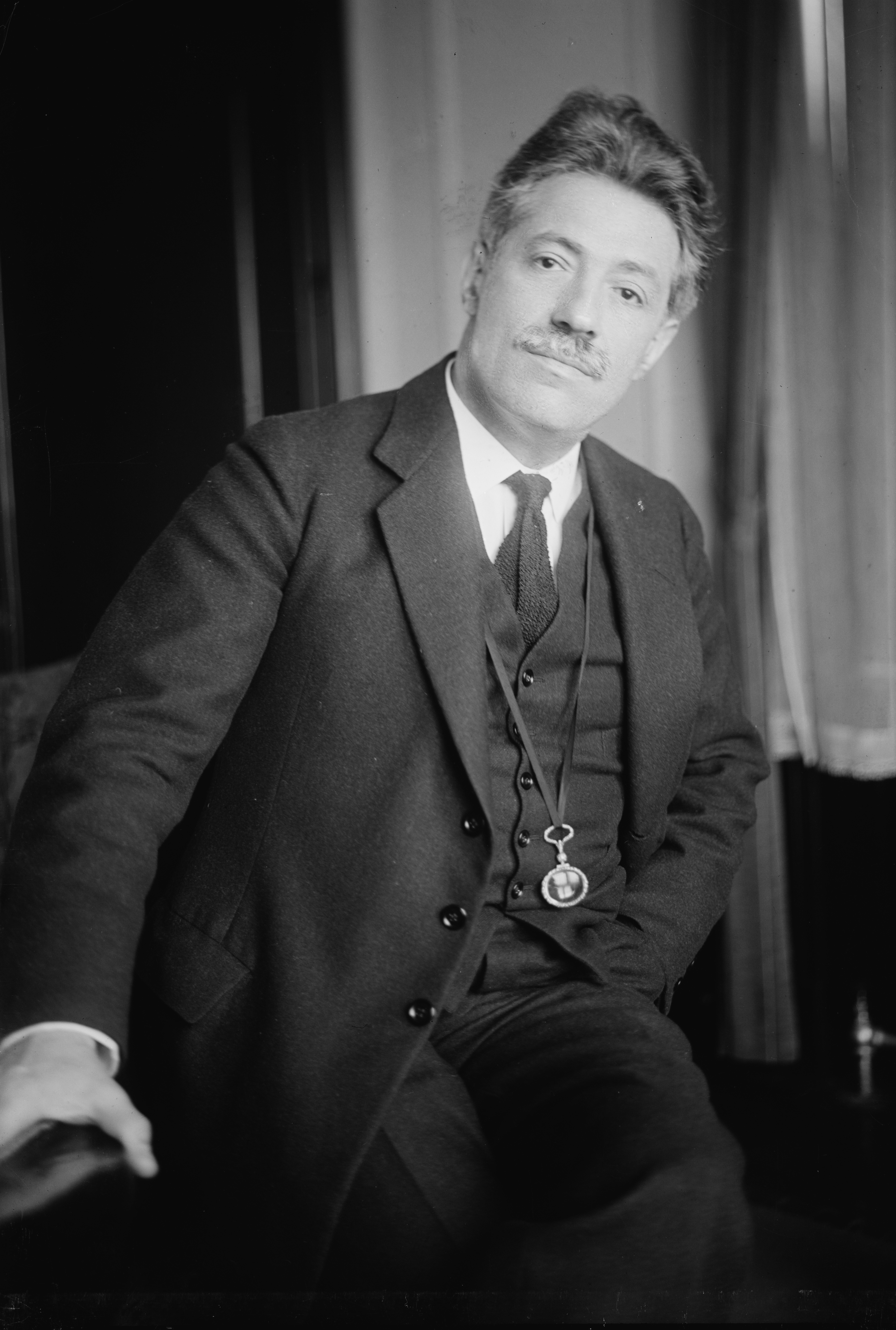
Fritz Kreisler

Below is a list of compositions by Fritz Kreisler sorted by genre.

== Original compositions ==
=== Operetta ===
- Apple Blossoms, operetta / musical (1919); music also by Victor Jacobi. Libretto by William LeBaron.
- Sissy, singspiel in 2 Acts (1932). Libretto by Ernst and Hubert Marischka.
- Rhapsody, operetta / Musical (1944). Libretto by John La Touche.
- Lisa. English version of Sissy. Libretto by John Grimsey (dialogues) and Tommie Connor (lyrics). Music adapted and arranged by Ronald Hanmer. Published in 1969.

=== Movie song ===
- Stars in my eyes from The King Steps Out (1936); lyrics by Dorothy Fields

=== Vocal ===
- The Bonnie Earl O'Moray (published 1917); lyrics by Reinhold von Warlich
- Cradle Song (published 1915); based on Caprice Viennois
- Drei Nachtgesänge (Three Night Songs) (published 1921); on poems of Joseph Freiherr von Eichendorff
- Leezie Lindsay (published 1917); lyrics by Reinhold von Warlich
- Love Comes and Goes (published 1934); based on Liebesleid; lyrics by Geraldine Farrar
- Madly in Love (published 1936); lyrics by Dorothy Fields
- The Old Sweet Song, duet for soprano and baritone (or tenor) (published 1915); based on Caprice Viennois; lyrics by J. Kilp
- O salutaris hostia (published 1916); after Louis Couperin; lyrics by Alice Mattullath
- O sanctissima (published 1916); freely adapted from a melody by Arcangelo Corelli; lyrics by Alice Mattullath
- The Praise of Islay (published 1917); lyrics by Reinhold von Warlich
- The Shepherd's Madrigal (published 1937); lyrics by Geraldine Farrar
- Stars in My Eyes (published 1936); lyrics by Dorothy Fields
- The Whole World Knows, a Viennese Love Song (published 1934); based on Caprice Viennois; lyrics by Geraldine Farrar

=== Piano ===
- External audio
  - You may listen to Fritz Kreisler's Liebesfreud - (Love's Joy) and Liebesleid (Love's Sorrow) performed by Fritz Kreisler on violin in 1943 here on archive.org
  Liebesfreud (Love's Joy) (published 1911)
- The Old Refrain, Viennese popular song (published 1919)
- Petit valse (published 1927)

=== String quartet ===
- String Quartet in A minor (premiered 1919; published 1921)

=== Cello and piano ===
- Allegretto in the Style of Boccherini (published 1910)
- Andantino in the Style of Martini (published 1910)
- Chanson Louis XIII et Pavane in the Style of Couperin (published 1910)
- Sicilienne and Rigaudon in the Style of Francœur (published 1910)

=== Solo violin ===
- Austrian Imperial Hymn Gott erhalte unseren Kaiser (published 1915)
- Recitative and Scherzo-Caprice for Solo Violin, Op. 6 (published 1911)
- Study on a Choral in the style of Johann Stamitz (published 1930)

=== Original cadenzas ===
- Beethoven Violin Concerto in D major, Op. 61 (published 1928); 3 cadenzas
- Brahms Violin Concerto in D major, Op. 77 (published 1928)
- Mozart Violin Concerto No. 3 in G major, K.216 (published 1946); 3 cadenzas
- Mozart Violin Concerto No. 4 in D major, K.218 (published 1946); 3 cadenzas
- Mozart Violin Concerto No. 5 in A major, K.219 (published 1946); 3 cadenzas
- Mozart Violin Concerto No. 6 in E♭ major, K. 268 (published 1946)
- Paganini Violin Concerto No. 1 in D major, Op.6, written for the arrangement / re-orchestration of I. Allegro maestoso (1936)
- Viotti Violin Concerto No. 22 in A minor (published 1966)

=== Violin and orchestra ===
- Violin Concerto in C major in the style of Vivaldi (also arranged for violin and piano - see below)

(I. Allegro energico ma non troppo; II. Andante doloroso; III. Allegro molto)

=== Violin and piano ===
Title	Publ. date	Remarks
Allegretto in the style of Boccherini	1910	falsely attributed to Luigi Boccherini
Allegretto in the style of Porpora	1913	falsely attributed to Nicola Porpora
Andantino in the style of Martini	1910	falsely attributed to Giovanni Battista Martini
Aubade Provençale in the style of Couperin	1911	falsely attributed to Louis Couperin
Aucassino and Nicolette, Medieval Canzonetta	1917	
Berceuse Romantique (Romantic Slumber-song), Op. 9	1916	
Caprice Viennois, Op. 2	1910	
Cavatina	1933	
Chanson Louis XIII et Pavane in the style of Couperin	1910	falsely attributed to Louis Couperin
La Chasse, Caprice in the style of Cartier	1911	falsely attributed to Jean Baptiste Cartier
Concerto in C major in the style of Vivaldi	1927	falsely attributed to Antonio Vivaldi; also for violin and string orchestra with organ ad lib.
Episode	1965	
Fantasie		written in 1883; unpublished
La Gitana	1917	Arabo-Spanish gypsy song of the 18th century
Grave in the style of W.F. Bach	1911	falsely attributed to Wilhelm Friedemann Bach
Gypsy Caprice	1927	
Liebesfreud (Love's Joy)	1905	No. 1 of Alt-Wiener Tanzweisen; falsely attributed to Joseph Lanner
Liebesleid (Love's Sorrow)	1905	No. 2 of Alt-Wiener Tanzweisen; falsely attributed to Joseph Lanner
Malagueña	1937	
Marche Miniature Viennoise (Miniature Viennese March)	1925	
Menuet in the style of Porpora	1910	falsely attributed to Nicola Porpora
Polichinelle (Sérénade)	1917	
Praeludium and Allegro in the style of Pugnani	1910	falsely attributed to Gaetano Pugnani
La Précieuse in the style of Couperin	1910	falsely attributed to Louis Couperin
Preghiera in the style of Martini	1911	falsely attributed to Giovanni Battista Martini
Retrospection	1945	from String Quartet in A minor
Romance, Op. 4	1910	
Rondino on a Theme of Beethoven	1915	based on an unused theme by Beethoven, from the rejected final movement of the Wind Octet in E♭ major (1793), later used as theme in the Rondò for violin and piano in G major WoO 41 - dedicated to Mischa Elman (1905)
Scherzo	1945	from String Quartet in A minor
Scherzo in the style of Dittersdorf	1910	falsely attributed to Carl Ditters von Dittersdorf
Schön Rosmarin	1905	No. 3 of Alt-Wiener Tanzweisen; falsely attributed to Joseph Lanner
Shepherd's Madrigal	1927	old German (18th century) melody
Sicilienne and Rigaudon in the style of Francœur	1910	falsely attributed to François Francœur
Song, Op. 7		
Syncopation	1926	
Tambourin Chinois, Op. 3	1910	
Tempo di Minuetto in the style of Pugnani	1938	falsely attributed to Gaetano Pugnani
Toy Soldier's March	1917	
Variations on a Theme by Corelli in the style of Tartini	1910	falsely attributed to Giuseppe Tartini
Viennese Rhapsodic Fantasietta	1948	

== Transcriptions and arrangements ==
=== Piano trio ===
- "Farewell to Cucullain" (The Londonderry Air), traditional tune arranged for violin, cello and piano by Kreisler and his brother, Hugo, a cellist (published 1922)

=== Violin and orchestra ===
- Concerto in one movement after Paganini's Violin Concerto Op.6, new cadenza / arrangement / re-orchestration of Violin Concerto No.1 in D (E♭) major, Op. 6, MS 21: I. Allegro Maestoso (published 1936)

=== Violin and piano ===
Original composer	Title	Publ. date	Remarks
Albéniz, Isaac	Malagueña	1927	original for piano: Op. 165, No. 3
Albéniz, Isaac	Tango in D major	1927	original for piano: Op. 165, No. 2
Bach, Johann Sebastian	Gavotte in E major	1913	original title Gavotte en rondeau from Partita No. 3, BWV1006 for solo violin
Bach, Johann Sebastian	Prelude in E major	1913	original from Partita No. 3, BWV1006 for solo violin
Balogh, Ernő	Caprice antique	1924	
Balogh, Ernő	Dirge of the North	1924	
Brahms, Johannes	Hungarian Dance No. 17 in F minor		original for piano 4-hands
Berlin, Irving	Blue Skies	1927	
Brandl, Johann	The Old Refrain (Du alter Stephansturm)	1905	traditional Viennese popular song
Chaminade, Cécile	Sérénade Espagnole		original for piano
Chopin, Frédéric	Mazurka No. 23 in D major, Op. 33, No. 2	1923	original for piano
Chopin, Frédéric	Mazurka No. 45 in A minor, Op. 67, No. 4	1915	original for piano
Corelli, Arcangelo	La Folia, Op. 5, No. 12		original for violin and cembalo
Corelli, Arcangelo	Sarabande and Allegretto	1913	
Dawes, Charles Gate	Melody in A major (1912)	1912	
Dvořák, Antonín	Humoresque	1906	original for piano: Op. 101, No. 7
Dvořák, Antonín	Indian Lament in G minor	1914	original for violin and piano: Larghetto of Sonatina, Op. 100
Dvořák, Antonín	Negro Spiritual Melody	1914	from the Largo of the New World Symphony, Op. 95
Dvořák, Antonín	Songs My Mother Taught Me	1914	original for voice and piano: Když mne stará matka spívat, Op. 55, No. 4
Dvořák, Antonín	Slavonic Dance No. 1 in G minor	1914	original for piano 4-hands: arranged from Slavonic Dances, Op. 46, No. 2 and Op. 72, No. 1 (ded. Achille Rivarde)
Dvořák, Antonín	Slavonic Dance No. 2 in E minor	1914	original for piano 4-hands: Op. 72, No. 2
Dvořák, Antonín	Slavonic Dance No. 3 in G major	1914	original for piano 4-hands: Op. 72, No. 8
Dvořák, Antonín	Slavonic Fantasie in B minor	1914	original themes from Songs My Mother Taught Me Op. 55 No. 4 and 4 Romantic Pieces Op. 75
Falla, Manuel de	Danse espagnole	1926	Danza I (from Act II Scene I) of the opera La vida breve
Foster, Stephen	Old Folks at Home (Swanee River)	1925	original for voice and piano
Friml, Rudolf	La Danse des demoiselles, Op. 48		
Gärtner, Eduard	Aus Wien (Viennese Melody)	1915	
Glazunov, Alexander	Sérénade espagnole, Op. 20, No. 2		original for cello and orchestra
Gluck, Christoph Willibald	Mélodie (Dance of the Blessed Spirits)	1913	original from the 1774 version of Orphée et Eurydice
Godowsky, Leopold	Nocturnal Tangier		original for piano: from Triakontameron (1919)
Grainger, Percy	Molly on the Shore (Irish reel)	1924	original for string quartet or string orchestra
Granados, Enrique	Danse espagnole (Spanish Dance No. 5) in E minor	1915	original for piano: No.5 Andaluza from Danzas españolas, Op. 37
Handel, George Frideric	Ombra mai fu, Largo		from the opera Serse
Haydn, Joseph	Gott erhalte unseren Kaiser	1915	Austrian National Anthem
Haydn, Joseph	Hungarian Rondò	1945	original from Piano Trio in G major, Hob.XV:25 'Gypsy'
Heuberger, Richard	Midnight Bells	1923	from the operetta Der Opernball (1898)
Hughes, Herbert	I saw from the beach (Irish melodies, Vol 6, nº12)		original melody by Thomas Moore, arranged for violin, voice and piano
Korngold, Erich Wolfgang	Tanzlied des Pierrot	1920	from the opera Die tote Stadt, Op. 12 (1920)
Krakauer, Alexander	Im Paradies (Paradise)	1922	Viennese folk-song
Leclair, Jean-Marie	Tambourin	1913	original from the Violin Sonata No. 3 in D major, Op. 9, No. 3 "Tombeau"
Lehár, Franz	Serenade from Frasquita	1927	from the operetta Frasquita
Liliuokalani	Aloha Oe	1925	Hawaiian melody
Logan, Frederic Knight	Pale Moon, Indian Love Song	1923	
Mendelssohn, Felix	Lied ohne Worte: May Breezes	1913	original for piano: Op. 62, No. 1 (1844)
Mozart, Wolfgang Amadeus	Rondo	1913	original for orchestra from the Haffner Serenade, K.250/248b
Nevin, Ethelbert	The Rosary (1898)	1917	
Owen, Elwyn	Invocation		
Paderewski, Ignacy Jan	Melody	1923	original for piano: Op. 16, No. 2
Paderewski, Ignacy Jan	Paraphrase on Paderewski's Famous Menuet	1917	original for piano: Op. 14, No. 1
Paganini, Niccolò	La Campanella (The Bell), Op. 7		original for violin and orchestra
Paganini, Niccolò	Caprice No. 13 in B♭ major	1913	original for violin solo
Paganini, Niccolò	Caprice No. 20 in D major	1913	original for violin solo
Paganini, Niccolò	Caprice No. 24 in A minor	1913	original for violin solo
Paganini, Niccolò	Moto Perpetuo in C major, Op. 11		original for violin and orchestra
Paganini, Niccolò	Le Streghe (The Witches' Dance), Op. 8		original for violin and orchestra
Paganini, Niccolò	Theme and Variations: I Palpiti, Op. 13		original for violin and orchestra
Paganini, Niccolò	Theme and Variations: Non più mesta, Op. 12		original for violin and orchestra
Poldini, Ede	Poupée valsante (Dancing Doll)	1924	No. 2 from Marionettes, 7 Piano pieces
Rachmaninoff, Sergei	Daisies		original for voice and piano: Маргаритки, Op. 38, No. 3 (1916)
Rachmaninoff, Sergei	Polka Italienne		original for piano
Rachmaninoff, Sergei	Preghiera (Prayer)	1940	original from the Piano Concerto No. 2
Rachmaninoff, Sergei	18th Variation from Paganini Rhapsody		original for piano and orchestra
Rachmaninoff, Sergei	6 Romances, Op. 4: No. 3, V molchan'i nochi taynoy (When night descends)		for voice, violin and piano; English version by Edward Agate
Rachmaninoff, Sergei	6 Romances, Op. 4: No. 4, Ne poy, krasavitsa, pri mne (Oh, cease thy singing, Maiden fair)		for voice, violin and piano; English version by John McCormack
Rachmaninoff, Sergei	15 Romances, Op. 26: No. 7, K detyam (To the children)		for voice, violin and piano; English version by Rosa Newmarch
Rachmaninoff, Sergei	15 Romances, Op. 26: No. 10, U moyego okna (Before my window)		for voice, violin and piano; English version by Rosa Newmarch
Rameau, Jean-Philippe	Tambourin	1913	from the opera Les fêtes d'Hébé
Ravel, Maurice	Habanera (Rapsodie espagnole: 2nd movt.)	1928	
Renk, Fritz	To a Pickaninny	1924	
Rimsky-Korsakov, Nikolai	Fantasy on Two Russian Themes, Op. 33		original for violin and orchestra: Фантазиа на русские темы
Rimsky-Korsakov, Nikolai	Song of India (Chanson hindoue) (1897)	1919	from the Opera Sadko
Rimsky-Korsakov, Nikolai	Hymn to the Sun	1919	from the Opera Le Coq d'Or
Rimsky-Korsakov, Nikolai	No.1 Danse orientale	1922	from Scheherazade
Rimsky-Korsakov, Nikolai	No.2 Chanson arabe	1922	from Scheherazade
Roeder, Edward	Wooden Shoe Dance, Op. 2	1923	
Schelling, Ernest	Irlandaise	1928	
Schubert, Franz	Ballet Music No. 2	1913	from Rosamunde von Cypern
Schubert, Franz	Impromptu in G♭ major	1913	original for piano: Op. 90, No. 3, D.899
Schubert, Franz	Moment musical in F minor	1913	original for piano: Op. 94, No. 3, D.780
Schumann, Robert	Romanze in A major	1913	original for oboe and piano: Op. 94, No. 2
Scott, Cyril	Lotus Land	1922	original for piano: Op. 47, No. 1
Tartini, Giuseppe	Fugue in A major	1913	
Tartini, Giuseppe	Sonata in G minor "The Devil's Trill"		original for solo violin (with figured bass accompaniment), Violin Sonata in G minor, B.g5; the Cadenza is composed by Kreisler
Tchaikovsky, Pyotr Ilyich	Andante cantabile	1925	from String Quartet No. 1 in D major, Op. 11 (1871)
Tchaikovsky, Pyotr Ilyich	Chanson sans paroles in F major	1924	original for piano: No. 3 from Souvenir de Hapsal, Op. 2 (1867)
Tchaikovsky, Pyotr Ilyich	Humoresque	1926	original for piano: No. 2 from 2 Morceaux, Op. 10 (1871)
Tchaikovsky, Pyotr Ilyich	Scherzo	192?	original for violin piano: No. 2 from Souvenir d'un lieu cher, Op. 42 (1878) -Revised & Edited by Kreisler-
Traditional	Farewell to Cucullain (The Londonderry Air)	1922	old Irish melody
Traditional	Russian Folk Songs (2)	1925	Paraphrase on "Volga Boatman's Song" and "A Folk Song"
Weber, Carl Maria von	Larghetto	1913	from Violin Sonata No. 1
Wieniawski, Henryk	Caprice in A minor	1913	originally for violin solo or violin duet: No. 4 from 8 Études-Caprices, Op. 18
Wieniawski, Henryk	Caprice in E♭ major "Alla salterella"	1913	originally for violin solo: No. 5 from L'Ecole Moderne, Op. 10

== Kreisler as editor ==
- Ernest Schelling – Concerto for violin and orchestra (1916)
- Robert Schumann – Fantasie in C major for violin and orchestra, Op. 131

== See also ==
- Musical hoax
