= Syncopation (disambiguation) =

Syncopation is a musical term for the stressing of a normally unstressed beat in a bar or the failure to sound a tone on an accented beat. It may also refer to:

- Syncopation (dance), dancing on unstressed beats, or improvised steps
- Syncopation (1929 film), early American musical
- Syncopation (1942 film), American musical
- Syncopation in algebra, a way of writing algebra that is not rhetorical, but also not fully symbolic
- "Syncopation", a 1926 violin and piano piece by Fritz Kreisler
- Syncopation, a 1982 album by Sly and Robbie
- "Syncopation", a song by Billy Ocean on the 1984 album Suddenly
- "Syncopation", a song by Babymetal on the 2016 album Metal Resistance

== See also ==
- Syncope (disambiguation)
