= International Fritz Kreisler Competition =

The International Fritz Kreisler Competition is a violin competition dedicated to the memory of violinist and composer Fritz Kreisler.

Founded in 1979, it is carried out every four years in Vienna, Austria. It is limited to violinists of or under 30 years of age. To avoid favoritism, the members of the jury may not enter their own students in the contest.

== Required repertoire ==
=== Preliminaries ===
- J. S. Bach: the first two movements of a solo sonata, the first four movements of a partita, or the Ciaccona (of the Second Partita)
- A caprice by Paganini, Wieniawski, or Ernst
- F. Kreisler: Recitative and Scherzo-Caprice

=== Semifinal ===
- G. Tartini: Devil's Trill Sonata with the Kreisler cadenza or
- F. Kreisler: Praeludium and Allegro or
- F. Kreisler: Variations on a Theme by Corelli
- A composition for violin and piano of the "Viennese school" from the 18th to the 20th century (Viennese classic, Brahms, R. Strauss, Schönberg, Webern, Krenek, etc.)
- A modern composition of the 20th century (violin/piano or violin solo) from a composer of the participant's home country
- A virtuoso composition of free choice (violin/piano or violin solo)
- One of Fritz Kreisler's short compositions or arrangements as an encore (e.g. Caprice Viennois, Tambourin Chinois, Liebesleid, Liebesfreud, Spanish Dance, Syncopation etc.)

=== Final ===
A violin concerto of the 19th or 20th century (the earliest accepted being Beethoven) with a Kreisler cadenza if possible

Most of these pieces must be played by memory.

== Finalists, laureates and winners ==
Violin
Year	1st	2nd	3rd	4th	5th	6th	7th
2022	(Brazil) Guido Sant'Anna	(Israel) Michael Shaham (Japan) Rino Yoshimoto		(Switzerland) Raphael Nussbaumer	(Germany) Amira Abouzahra	(United States) Elli Choi	
2018	(Czech Republic) Milan Al-Ashab	(Canada) Alice Lee	(Austria) Paul Kropfitsch	(South Korea) Soo-Hyun Park	(Japan) Natsumi Tsuboi	(Japan) Rino Yoshimoto	
2014	(Czech Republic) Jan Mracek	(United States) William Hagen	(Austria) Emmanuel Tjeknavorian	(China) Danfeng Shen	(Romania) Ioana Cristina Goicea	(United States) Robyn Bollinger	(France) Shuichi Okada
2010	(Russia) Nikita Boriso-Glebsky	(Russia) Ekaterina Frolova	(Russia) Aylen Pritchin	(South Korea) Yura Lee	(Japan) Shiori Terauchi	(Japan) / (Canada) Eugene Nakamura	(Serbia) Ilja Marinkovic
2005	(France) Fanny Clamagirand	(Spain) Leticia Munoz Moreno	(Japan) Kyoko Yonemoto	(Hungary) Antal Szalai	(Germany) Andreas Janke	(Poland) Lucja Madziar	
2000	(Russia) Sergej Krylov	(Armenia) Sergey Khachatryan	(Argentina) Alexis Cardenas	(Canada) Judy Kang	(Japan) Akiko Ono	(Japan) Yukiko Ishibashi	(Serbia) Ilja Marinkovic
1996	(Japan) Daishin Kashimoto	(Italy) Giovanni Angeleri					
1992	(Romania) Florin Croitoru	(United States) Rachel Barton Pine	(Austria) Tomo Keller	(Germany) Albrecht Brueninger	(Canada) Patricia Shih	(Russia) Natalia Lhikopoi	
1983	(United States) Maria Bachmann	(Netherlands) Marc Daniel van Biemen					
1979	(Soviet Union) Dmitri Sitkovetsky	(Japan) Hiro Kurosaki	(Japan) Shizuka Ishikawa	(Romania) Gabriel Croitoru	(Bulgaria) Mitcho Dimitrov		
