= Tambourin Chinois =

1910 composition by Fritz Kreisler

- by Fritz Kreisler
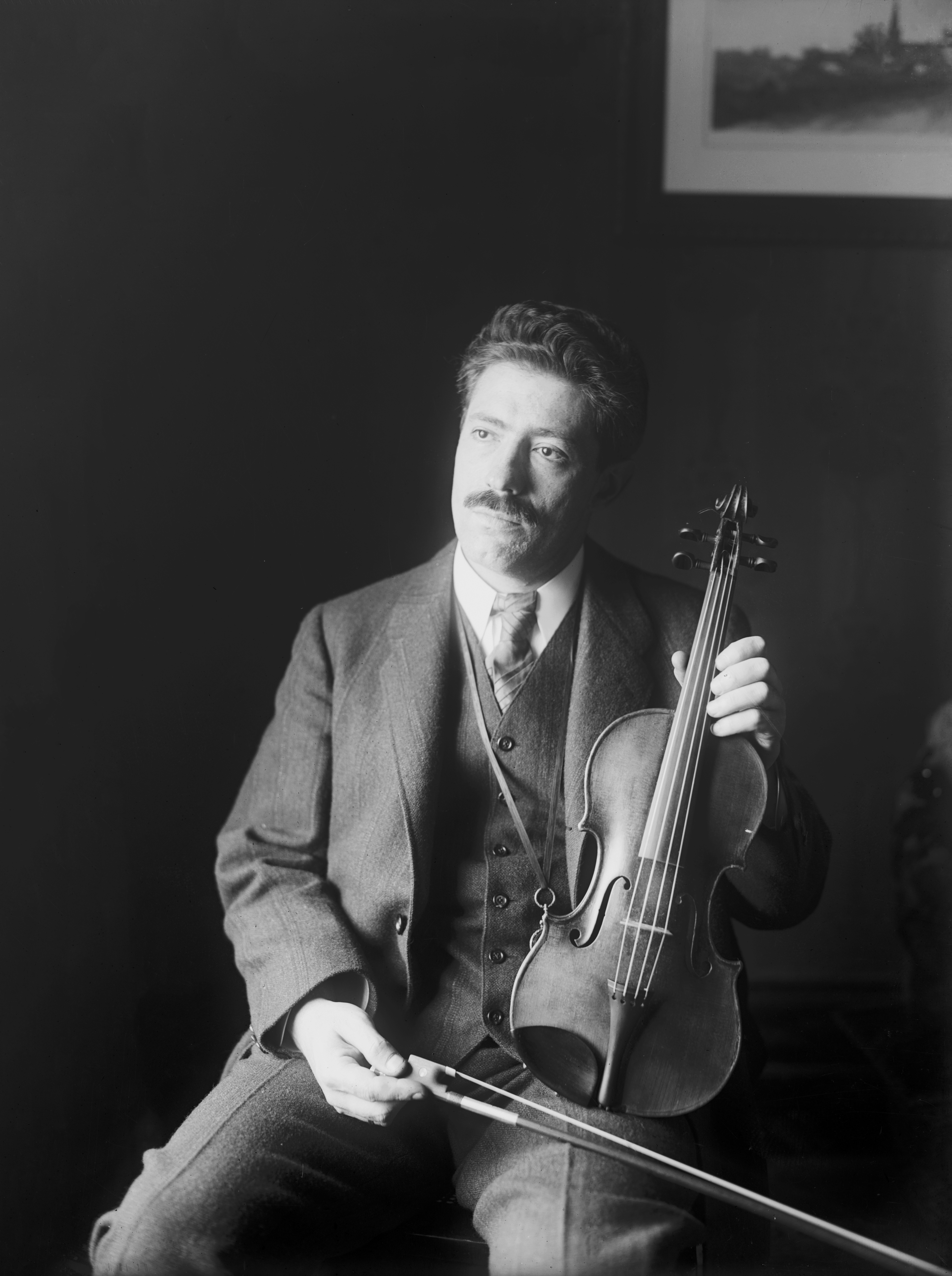
- Picture of composer
- Key: B♭ major
- Opus: 3
- Year: 1910
- Duration: 4 minutes
- Scoring: Violin and Piano

Kreisler - Tambourin Chinois Op. 3
performed by the Park Sisters

Tambourin Chinois, Op. 3, known in English as Chinese Tambourine or Chinese Drum, is a piece by composer Fritz Kreisler for Violin and Piano. It is one of his most well-known pieces behind his Old Viennese Melodies and Praeludium and Allegro.

== Composition ==
The piece is inspired from a performance of traditional Chinese music heard by the composer while they visited San Francisco. As such, the piece is highly inspired by the pentatonic scale, though Kreisler said that he did not take any thematic information from his visit.
