= Musical hoax =

Intentionally misattributed music

A musical hoax (also musical forgery and musical mystification) is a piece of music composed by an individual who intentionally misattributes it to someone else.

== Ascribed to historical figures ==
- Henri Casadesus
  - Viola Concerto in B minor by "George Frideric Handel"
  - Viola Concerto in C minor by "Johann Christian Bach"
  - Viola Concerto in D major by "Carl Philipp Emanuel Bach"
  - Violin Concerto in D major by "Luigi Boccherini"
- Marius Casadesus
  - Adélaïde Concerto by "Wolfgang Amadeus Mozart"
- Samuel Dushkin
  - Grave for violin and orchestra by "Johann Georg Benda"
  - Sicilienne for strings and clavier by "Maria Theresia von Paradis"
- François-Joseph Fétis
  - Lute Concerto by "Valentin Strobel"
  - "Pietà, Signore!" (a.k.a. "Se i miei sospiri") by "Alessandro Stradella"
- Remo Giazotto
  - Adagio in G minor by "Tomaso Albinoni"
- Mikhail Goldstein
  - Albumblatt (Листок из Альбома) by "Alexander Glazunov"
  - Impromptu (Экспромт) by "Mily Balakirev"
  - Viola Concerto in C major by "Ivan Khandoshkin"
- Arthur Hutchings
  - "New works" by "Paul Hindemith", using the rhythms and dynamics of a Beethoven piano sonata with nonsensically wrong notes.
- Fritz Kreisler
  - Allegretto by "Luigi Boccherini"
  - Andantino by "Giovanni Battista Martini"
  - Aubade Provençale by "Louis Couperin"
  - Chanson Louis XIII and Pavane by "Louis Couperin"
  - La Chasse (Caprice) by "Jean Baptiste Cartier"
  - Grave by "Wilhelm Friedemann Bach"
  - Menuett by "Nicola Porpora"
  - Praeludium and Allegro by "Gaetano Pugnani"
  - La Précieuse by "Louis Couperin"
  - Preghiera by "Giovanni Battista Martini"
  - Scherzo by "Carl Ditters von Dittersdorf"
  - Sicilienne and Rigaudon by "François Francoeur"
  - Study on a Choral by "Johann Stamitz"
  - Tempo di Minuetto by "Gaetano Pugnani"
  - Variations on a Theme by Corelli by "Giuseppe Tartini"
  - Violin Concerto in C major by "Antonio Vivaldi"
  - Alt-Wiener Tanzweisen by "Joseph Lanner"
- Winfried Michel
  - Six "lost" keyboard sonatas by "Joseph Haydn," "Hob. XVI:2a–e and 2g"
- Édouard Nanny
  - Double Bass Concerto in A major by "Domenico Dragonetti"
- Siegfried Ochs
  - Dank sei Dir, Herr by "George Frideric Handel"
- Alessandro Parisotti
  - "Se tu m'ami" by "Giovanni Battista Pergolesi"
- Manuel Ponce
  - Suite in A minor by "Sylvius Leopold Weiss"
  - Preamble & Gavotte by "Alessandro Scarlatti"
- David Popper
  - Cello Concerto No. 5 in C major, Hob. VIIb:5 by "Joseph Haydn"
- Vladimir Vavilov
  - Ave Maria by Anonymous; The piece later received an unrelated misattribution to Giulio Caccini.
  - Elegy for guitar by "Mikhail Vysotsky"
  - Canzona and Dance and several Ricercars for lute by "Francesco Canova da Milano"
  - Pavane and Gallarde for lute by "Vincenzo Galilei"
  - Mazurka in C minor for guitar by "Andrei Sychra"
  - Nocturne in C minor for guitar by "Vassily Sarenko"
  - Ricercar for lute by "Niccolo Nigrino"
  - Chaconne for lute by "Hans Neusidler"
  - Pasturelle for lute by "Jean-Antoine de Baïf"
  - Gavotte for lute by "Denis Gaultier"

== Ascribed to non-existent or purported historical individuals ==
- Hans Keller and Susan Bradshaw
  - Mobile for Tape and Percussion (1961) by "Piotr Zak"
- Mikhail Goldstein
  - Symphony No. 21 by "Mykola Ovsianiko-Kulikovsky"
- Winfried Michel
  - Chamber music by "Giovanni Paolo Simonetti"
  - Chamber music by "Giovanni Paolo Tomesini"
- Roman Turovsky-Savchuk
  - Works for baroque lute by "Johann Joachim Sautscheck", "Gotthold Ephraim Sautscheck", "Konradin Aemilius Sautscheck", et al.
  - Works for renaissance lute by "Ioannes Leopolita" and "Jacobus Olevsiensis"
- Rohan Kriwaczek
  - Works for solo violin, ascribed to various fictional English "funeral violinists".
