= Syncope =

Syncope or Syncopy may refer to:

- Syncope (medicine), also known as fainting or passing out, a loss of consciousness
- Syncope (phonology), the loss of one or more sounds, particularly an unstressed vowel, from the interior of a word
- Syncopation, a musical effect caused by off-beat or otherwise unexpected rhythms
- Syncopation (dance), or syncopated step, a step on an unstressed beat
- Suspension, in music
- Syncope (frog), a genus of microhylidae frogs
- Syncopy Inc., a British film production company

== See also ==
- Syncopation (disambiguation)
