= Ede Poldini =

Hungarian composer (1869–1957)

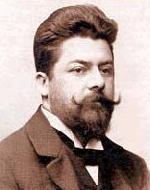
Ede Poldini

Ede Poldini (13 June 1869 – 28 June 1957) was a Hungarian composer of the late romantic / early modern period. Famous in Hungary for writing many operas, he became internationally famous when Fritz Kreisler transcribed his piano piece "La poupée valsante" for violin.

Poldini studied with István Tomka in Budapest and with Eusebius Mandyczewski in Vienna. In 1908 he settled in Switzerland, writing two of his more famous operas: The Vagabond and the Princess (1903) and Wedding in Carnival Time (1924). These were both produced in London, the latter under the title Love Adrift. Himfy was produced in 1938 in Budapest.

Poldini is best known for his miniature piano pieces, such as "La poupée valsante", given wider audience in Fritz Kreisler's transcription, "Arlequinades", "Morceaux pittoresques", "Episodes à la cour", "Images", and "Moments musicaux". "Marionettes" were seven piano pieces that he later orchestrated.

His one-act opera The Vagabond and the Princess was given 14 times in Dresden in 1916/17 under Fritz Reiner with a cast including Ludwig Ermold, Minnie Nast, Georg Zottmayr and Richard Tauber.

He died in Vevey, Switzerland in 1957, aged 88.
