= Ivan Khandoshkin =

Russian composer

Ivan Yevstafyevich Khandoshkin (Russian: Иван Евстафьевич Хандошкин; 1747 – 29 or 30 March 1804) was a Russian violinist and composer of Cossack origin. He has been described as "the finest Russian violinist of the eighteenth century".

== Life ==
Ivan Khandoshkin was born into a Cossack family near Myrhorod. He was related to the family of Hetman Danylo Apostol. Ivan's father Ostap was trained as a tailor, but eventually became a professional French horn and percussion player in the court orchestra of Tsar Peter III.

Ivan studied under Tito Porta with other Italian influences being Domenico dall’Oglio and Pietro Peri. He was a musician at the Russian court, of which he later became kapellmeister, from 1765 and he taught violin at the Yekaterinoslav Musical Academy, founded by Potemkin in 1785. After Potemkin's death Khandoshkin was forced to resign by Giuseppe Sarti who was considered his rival, and returned to St. Petersburg in 1789.

== Works ==
Khandoshkin's extant works comprise six violin sonatas and several variation cycles based on folk songs. His music (primarily for the violin) is comparable to music by his contemporaries such as Giuseppe Tartini's student Antonio Lolli (whose stunts on the violin preceded Paganini), Gaetano Pugnani, Ludwig Spohr, and many others.

His music was unfamiliar to the average western ear until recently. In 1996 Elena Denisova recorded three of his violin sonatas for Talking Music where they were released in the following year. In 2016 she performed them at the Salzburg Festival. Anastasia Khitruk performed several works and recorded them for Naxos in St. Petersburg's St. Catherine's Church in 2005.

=== "Viola concerto" ===
The so-called Khandoshkin viola concerto in C Major was purported to be written in 1801. It was published in Moscow by the State Publishing House in 1947 and released in the Soviet Union on the Melodya record label, with Rudolf Barshai playing viola and conducting the Moscow Chamber Orchestra. The work is actually not by Khandoshkin, but was a musical hoax by the German composer and violinist Mikhail Goldstein.
