= Mikhail Goldstein =

German composer, violinist and violin teacher

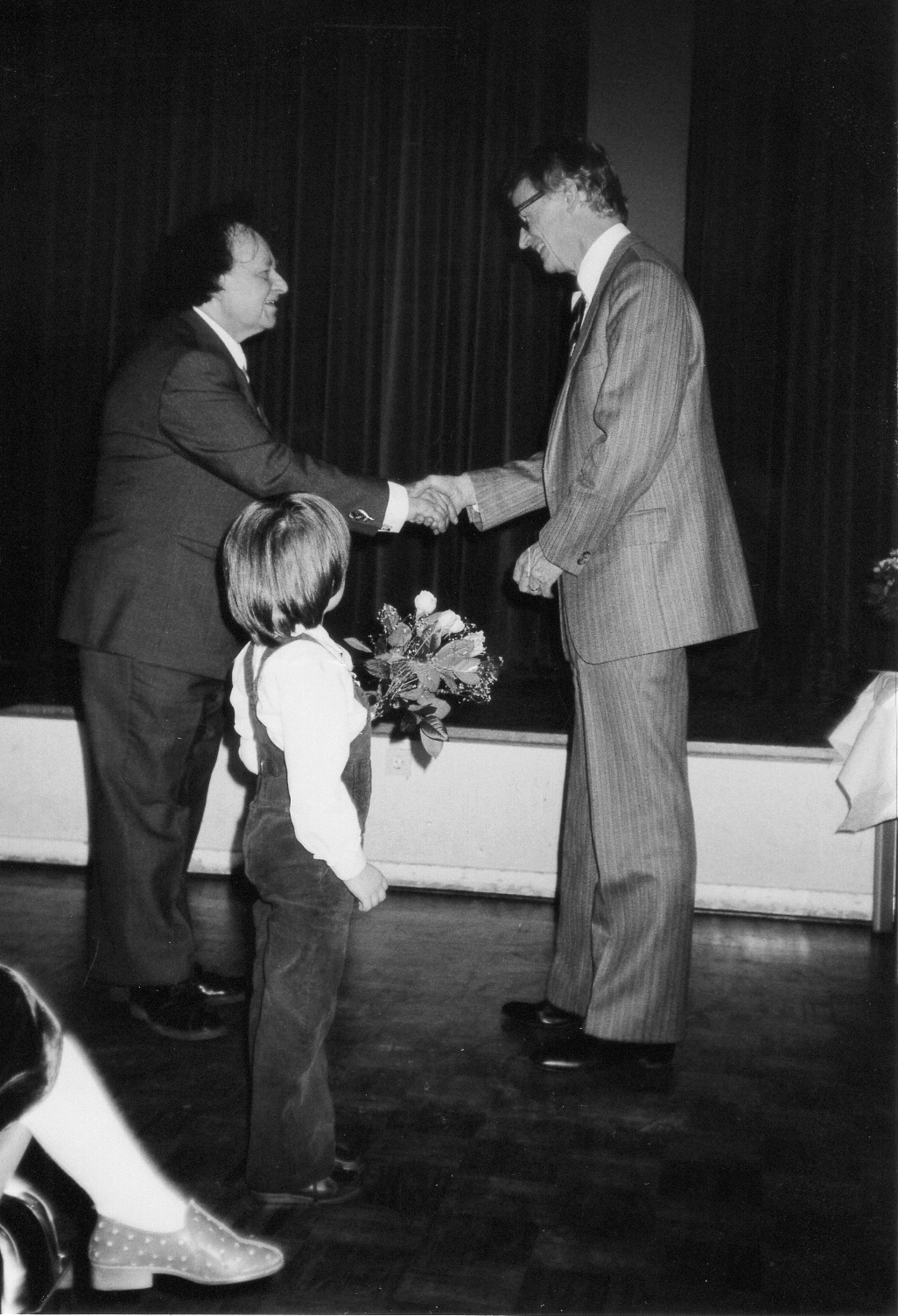
Goldstein (left) with pastor Carl Malsch in 1981

Mikhail Emmanuilovich Goldstein (Russian: Михаил Эммануилович Гольдштейн, also transcribed as Michael Emmanuilowitsch Goldstein, Hebrew: מיכאל גולדשטיין; pen name: Mykhailo Mykhailovsky; 18 September [O.S. 5 September] 1917 – 7 September 1989) was a German composer, violinist and violin teacher of Jewish origin, brother of prominent violinist Boris Goldstein.

== Biography ==
Goldstein was born as Moisey (Moishe) Goldshteyn in Odessa on October 1, 1917, the son of personal distinguished citizen Mendel Abramovich-Geynikhovich Goldshteyn (born 1885 in Odessa) and Sura Iosifovna Goldshteyn (nee Kigel, born 1887 in Orhei), who registered their marriage on July 26, 1909 in Odessa. His paternal grandparents, married in Odessa on August 10, 1876, were Odessa dweller Abram-Geynikh Goldshteyn and Nemyriv dweller Pesya Yudkovna Siminshteyn. Michael Goldstein started studying the violin at age four at the School of Stolyarsky in Odessa with Pyotr Stolyarsky who was also the teacher of David Oistrach and Nathan Milstein.

He was the author of the celebrated musical hoax "Ovsianiko-Kulikovsky's Symphony No. 21" as well as several others, notably "Expromt" by Balakirev", "Albumblatt" (Листок из Альбома) by Glazunov"' the "Viola Concerto in C Major by Ivan Khandoshkin", etc. He concentrated on composition after his career as a violinist was curtailed by a hand injury.

On New Year's Eve 1942, Goldstein was at an open air party held by the Soviet commissars to honor visiting artists, musicians, and actors during a lull in the Battle of Stalingrad. Horrified by the utter destruction all around, he played his violin over the loudspeakers, playing even German music, though it had been banned by the Soviets and all went quiet. After he had finished, the German lines shouted for a ceasefire so he could play more Bach. Goldstein obliged.

He was a winner of three prizes at the 1963 All-Union Composers' Competition (compositions for violin and cello). Apparently he submitted his entries under pseudonyms. After this incident his political difficulties increased. He took a teaching position in East Berlin in 1964. He moved to Vienna and Jerusalem in 1967, moved to London in 1968, and finally to Hamburg, Germany in 1969.
He gave concerts with Galina Kowal and Michael Minsky.

His musical and teaching activities were recognized in Germany with the Bundesverdienstkreuz medal. He was a professor at the Musikhochschule Hamburg from 1969. His teaching assistant was Erdmute Knolle.

Among his students was Angelika Bachmann from the group Salut Salon.

His daughter Lidia Goldstein is also a violinist and teaches at the music school of Quickborn, Germany.

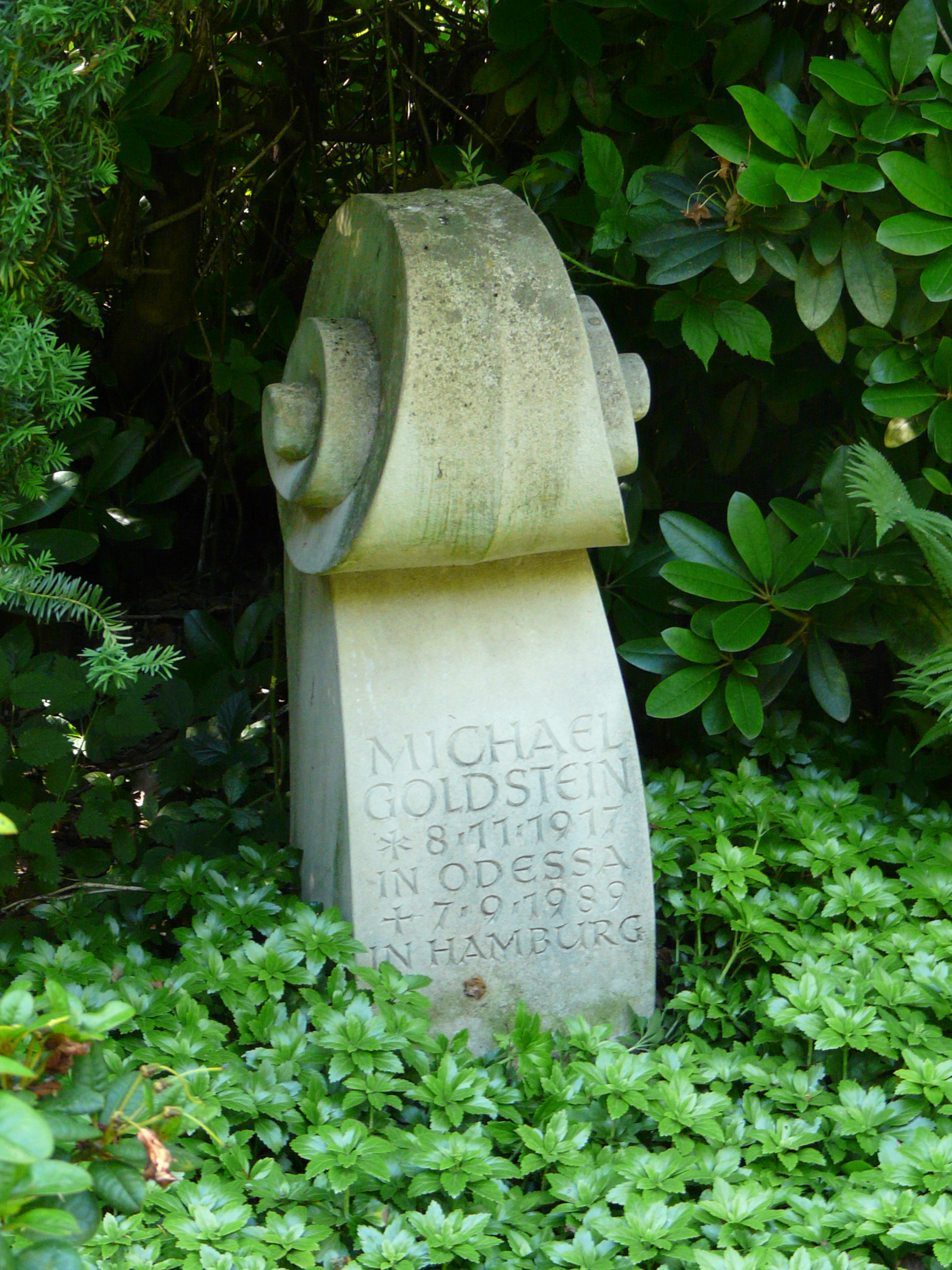
Gravestone in Hamburg, in the form of a violin scroll.

He died in Hamburg in 1989, aged 71.

== Discography ==
- Michael Goldstein: Ukrainische Rhapsodie für Klavier und Orchester (unter dem Pseudonym Michajlo Michajlovsky). Aufnahme des NDR mit Galina Kowal, Klavier, und dem Rundfunkorchester Hannover des NDR unter Richard Müller-Lampertz
- Johann Sebastian Bach: Partiten für Violine solo. Michael Goldstein, Violine.
- Johann Sebastian Bach: Sonaten für Violine solo. Michael Goldstein, Violine.
- Bekannte und unbekannte Werke von Bach. Michael Goldstein (Violine) und Heinz Wunderlich (Orgel).
- Russischer Geiger und Virtuose Michael Goldstein spielt Sonaten und Partiten von J. S. Bach auf einer Weidler-Geige ganz aus Ahornholz

== Works ==
- Michael Goldstein: Peter Stoljarskij. Der Violin-Pädagoge und seine Fabrik der Talente in Odessa. Aus dem Nachlass herausgegeben von François Maher Presley, in-Cultura.com, Hamburg 2015, ISBN 978-3-930727-34-6.
- Michael Goldstein: Michail Ignátieff und die Balalaika – Die Balalaika als solistisches Konzertinstrument. Zimmermann, Frankfurt am Main 1978, ISBN 3-921729-01-7.
- Michael Goldstein: 20 kleine Präludien für Viola. Möseler, Wolfenbüttel, 1982.
- Michael Goldstein: Michael Goldsteins Methode im ersten Violinunterricht (Michael Goldstein's violin school in 2 volumes). J. Schuberth & Co., Hamburg 1978.
- Michael Goldstein: Kinder musizieren (Children make music) for violin and piano. J. Schuberth & Co, Hamburg 1982.
- Alexander Glasunow: Albumblatt for violin and piano. M. P. Belaieff, Frankfurt/M. Herausgegeben von Michael Goldstein. (In fact, Goldstein is the composer.)
- Michael Goldstein: Gavotte über B-A-C-H for solo violin.
- Joseph Reicha: Konzert Es-dur Op 2/1 für Viola. Verlag Anton J. Benjamin. Bearbeitet von Michael Goldstein. (In fact, Goldstein is the composer.)
- Giuseppe Tartini: Sonate in E. Heinrichshofen Verlag. Herausgegeben von Michael Goldstein. (In fact, Goldstein is the composer.)
- Michael Goldstein: Puppentanz for solo violin.
- Mykola Ovsianiko-Kulikovsky: Symphonie No. 21. (In fact, Goldstein is the composer.)
- Mily Balakirev: Expromt for violin and piano. (In fact, Goldstein is the composer.)
- Ivan Khandoshkin: Viola Concerto in C Major. (In fact, Goldstein is the composer.)
- Michael Goldstein: Zwölf kleine Präludien in der ersten Lage, Edition Peters, Leipzig 1964.
- Michael Goldstein: Zwölf kleine Präludien für zwei Violinen (erste Lage), Edition Peters, Leipzig 1964.

== Sources ==
- Сорокер, Я. Євреї в музиці України - Сучасність, 2 (286) (лютий, 1995) 54-65.
- Гольдштейн М. Записки музыканта. Франкфурт-на-Майне, 1970
- Полищук, Ян. Гений или злодей. "Литературная газета" 5 января 1959 г.
- Музыкальная подделка. В кн.: Энциклопедический музыкальный словарь. Изд. Москва, 1966 г., Стр. 331.
