= Mykola Ovsianiko-Kulikovsky =

Mykola Ovsianiko-Kulikovsky (Russian: Николай Овсянико-Куликовский, Nikolay Ovsyaniko-Kulikovskiy, 1768–1846) was the purported author of a famous musical hoax Symphony No. 21 (Ovsianiko-Kulikovsky), perpetrated by composer and violinist Mikhail Goldstein.

In 1948, Goldstein announced that he had discovered the manuscript of a symphony by Ovsianiko-Kulikovsky in the archives of the Odesa Conservatory where he worked. The G minor work, numbered 21, was said to have been written in 1809; it bore the inscription "for the dedication of the Odessa Theater". The discovery caused a great deal of excitement in Soviet musical circles, for it was seen as proof that Russia had been able to produce a symphonist of comparable stature to Joseph Haydn. Furthermore, the symphony contained Ukrainian folk songs and ended with a Cossack dance, showing that the composer had a nationalist awareness. This piece was subsequently proven to be a fake.

== Description ==
1. Adagio – Allegro (G minor)
2. Romance. Adagio (G major)
3. Minuet (G minor, with trio in G major)
4. Finale. Kazachok (G major)

== Purported composer ==
Little is known about Ovsianiko-Kulikovsky's life besides his dates of birth (1768) and death (1846). A native of Kherson Oblast, he is known to have been a landowner and patron of the arts; in 1810 he presented his orchestra of serfs to the Odessa Theater. No evidence has yet come to light to suggest that he was active as a composer. He was the grandfather of the linguist Dmitri Ovsianiko-Kulikovsky.

== Hoax discovery ==
The piece was performed in Odessa and in Kyiv in 1949, and was published by the state music publishers in 1951. It was also quickly recorded for Melodiya by Yevgeny Mravinsky, and was soon the subject of treatises by two Soviet musicologists.

One of the musicologists to study the work was a composer and Kyiv conservatory professor named Gleb Taranov, who was asked to examine the manuscript of the symphony. Upon completing his examination, he concluded that neither Ovsianiko-Kulikovsky nor Mikhail Goldstein had written the symphony. Goldstein, however, stated that the symphony was in fact his own work. He had been stung when a communist party functionary savaged his use of Ukrainian themes in one of his own pieces, claiming that as a Jew he could not understand Ukrainian culture and had no right to use it in his music. When Goldstein replied that Beethoven also made use of Ukrainian themes in his "Razumovsky Quartets" the functionary said bluntly that "Beethoven was not a Jew." The symphony, then, was written as an act of revenge, to prove that he could, in fact, write "Ukrainian" music. Vsevolod Chаgovets, a philosemitic Ukrainian musician-friend of his, made the suggestion to ascribe the symphony to "Ovsianniko-Kulikovsky".

Goldstein was branded a liar and a traitor to Soviet culture for his actions; he emigrated from the USSR in 1964 and lived in West Germany from 1969. He spent his remaining years teaching and working as a musicologist in Hamburg.

The hoax was not acknowledged in some later publications. The work continues to be taught in courses on Ukrainian music at the major conservatories in Ukraine.

== Publication ==
Ovsianiko-Kulikovsky: Symphony No. 21. full score, 22.2 x 30 cm 79pp. Moscow, Muzgiz, 1951. 480 copies printed.

== Recording ==
The Melodiya recording of the symphony has recently been reissued.

MELODIYA - MEL 1000933 Evgeni Mravinsky Glazunov & Ovsianiko-Kulikovski

Leningrad Philharmonic Orchestra
Evgeni Mravinski, conductor

- Alexander Glazunov (1865–1936) Symphony No. 4 in E flat Major en, op. 48
- Nikolai Ovsianiko-Kulikovski (Michael Goldstein) Symphony No. 21 in G minor

1 CD - ADD - TT: 55' 42
Recorded in 1948 (Glazunov) & 1954 (Ovsianiko-Kulikovski)
