= Winfried Michel =

German composer (born 1948)

Winfried Michel (born 1948) is a German recorder, player, composer, and editor of music.

Michel studied with Ingetraud Drescher, Nikolaus Delius, and Frans Brüggen. He is lecturer for the recorder at the Staatliche Hochschule Münster and at the Musikakademie Kassel. In addition to compositions published under his own name, he has written numerous pieces in the style of the early 18th century under the pseudonym Giovanni Paolo Simonetti. In 1993 he succeeded in convincing noted Haydn scholar H. C. Robbins Landon and the pianist/scholars Paul and Eva Badura-Skoda that six piano sonatas he had composed were long-lost works by Joseph Haydn.

Based on the opening few bars of six lost Haydn works, found in an old thematic index, these sonatas were published in 1995 as works by Haydn, "supplemented and edited by Winfried Michel." He has similarly completed the Viola Sonata left as a two-movement fragment by Mikhail Glinka with a menuet as third movement, even though Glinka would have—according to his autobiography—put a rondo.

== Compositions ==
=== As Winfried Michel ===
- Aceto e vino, for harpsichord (1991)
- , for two violins (archive from 9 October 2007, accessed 14 September 2014)
- Il flauto da gamba, for recorder and piano
- Gedämfte Schwingung, for solo alto recorder (1988/93)
- Glissgliss, op. 16, for recorder and piano
- Spielwelt und Weltspiel, op. 49, song cycle
- Taglied mit dem Schatten, for voice and piano
- Trombetta sordina, for recorder and metronome
- Tu-i, op. 4, for alto recorder and harpsichord (1990)
- Der Vogel hinter der Welt, op. 42, pantomime

=== As Giovanni Paolo Simonetti ===
- Six Trio Sonatas, op. 2
  - 3. Sonata in B Minor, for recorder, transverse flute and continuo
  - 6. Concerto D'echi, for two recorders and continuo
- Sonata in F minor, op. 3, no. 1, for recorder and continuo
- Concerto in D minor, op. 4, for recorder, strings and continuo
- Sonata (Concerto) in G minor, op. 4, no. 2, for recorder, transverse flute, and viola
- Trio Sonata in F major, op. 5, no. 1, for alto recorder, oboe (or violin), and continuo
- Trio Sonata in C minor ("La Burrasca"), op. 5, no. 2, for recorder, violin, and continuo
- Trio Sonata in G minor, op. 5, no. 3, for alto recorder, bass recorder, and continuo
- Trio Sonata in G major, op. 5, no. 4, for transverse flute, obligato violoncello, and continuo
- Sonata and Ciacona, op. 8, for three alto recorders
- Two Trio Sonatas, op. 10, for recorder, viola, and continuo
  - 1.
  - 2. E-flat major
- Ciacona, op. 9, for harpsichord
- Ciacona, op. 11, for flute and violin
- Madrigale, for solo violin
- Minuet in G major ("Il Gambio"), for alto recorder, oboe, and continuo

=== As "Joseph Haydn" ===
- 6 "Lost" keyboard sonatas Hob.XVI/2a–e, g, "No. 21–26"
  - Sonata in D minor, Hob.XVI:2a, "No. 21"
  - Sonata in A major, Hob.XVI:2b, "No. 22"
  - Sonata in B major, Hob.XVI:2c, "No. 23"
  - Sonata in B flat major, Hob.XVI:2d, "No. 24"
  - Sonata in E minor, Hob.XVI:2e, "No. 25"
  - Sonata in C major, Hob.XVI:2g, "No. 26"
