= Syncopation (dance) =

Dance technique

The terms syncopation and syncopated step in dancing are used for two senses:

1. The first definition matches the musical term: stepping on (or otherwise emphasizing) an unstressed beat. For example, ballroom cha-cha-cha is a syncopated dance in this sense, because the basic step "breaks on two". An example for a syncopated dance figure is the lockstep in quickstep and waltz. When dancing to the disparate threads contained within the music, hands, torso, and head can independently move in relation to a thread, creating a fluidly syncopated performance of the music.
2. The word "syncopation" is often used by dance teachers to mean improvised or rehearsed execution of step patterns that have more rhythmical nuances than "standard" step patterns. It takes advanced dancing skill to dance syncopations in this sense. Advanced dancing of West Coast Swing and the Lindy Hop makes heavy use of "syncopation" in this sense (although swing music and swing dances feature the "usual" syncopation, i.e., emphasising the even beats).

Many dance teachers criticise the use of the term "syncopation" and abandon it in favour of the term "double-time". That is most likely because of a convenience in similarity and/or a misunderstanding of the rhythmic concept.

Dance syncopation often matches musical syncopation, such as when (in West Coast Swing) the leader touches slightly before beat 3 or stomps on beat 6.
