= Gaetano Pugnani =

Italian violinist and composer

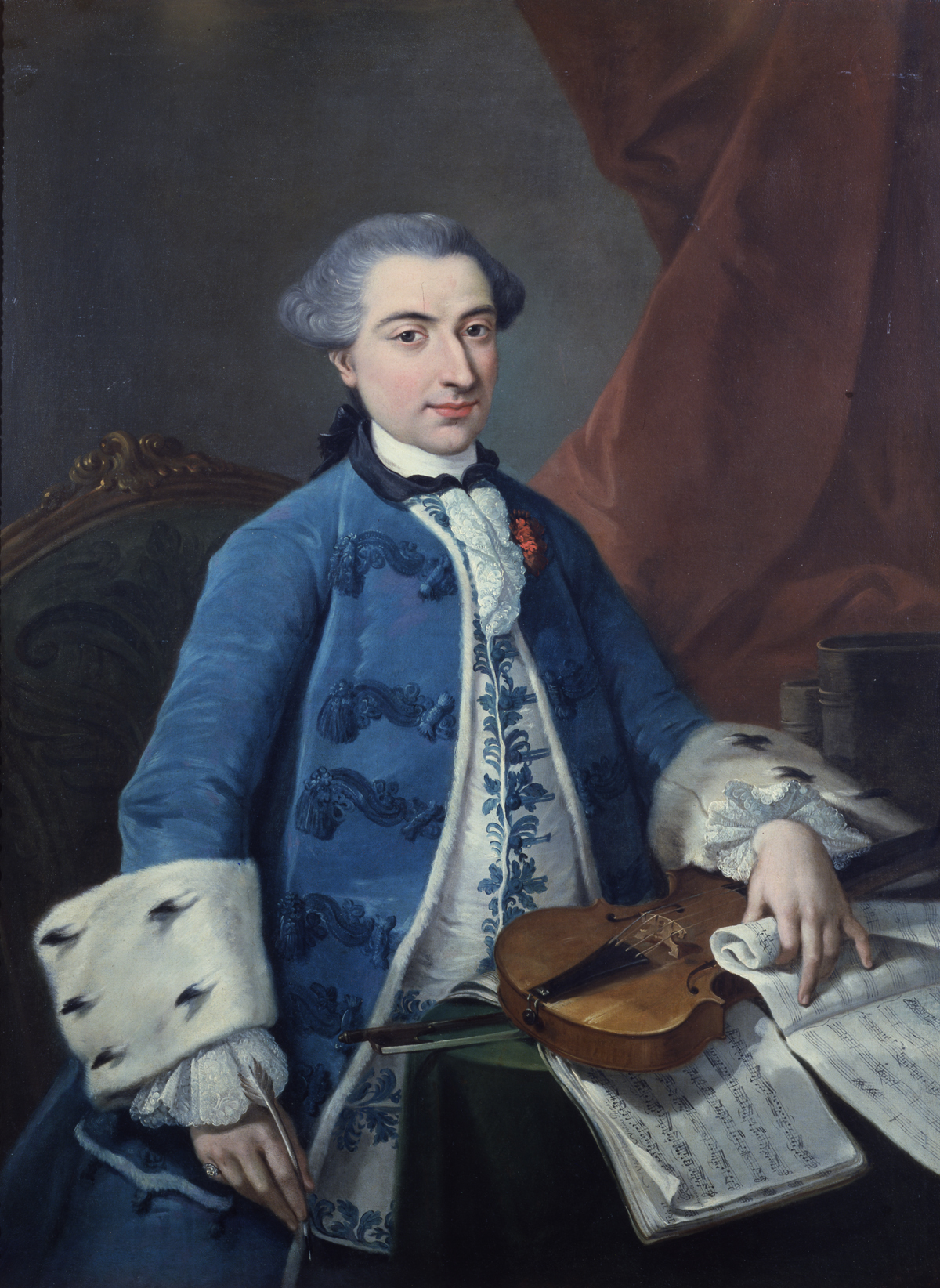
Gaetano Pugnani

Gaetano Pugnani (27 November 1731 – 15 July 1798, full name: Giulio Gaetano Gerolamo Pugnani) was an Italian composer and violinist.

== Biography ==
Gaetano Pugnani was born in 1731 in Turin, the city where he spent most of his life, son of Giovanni Battista Pugnani, secretary in the office of the Director of the Settlement of Turin. The Pugnani originate from the comune of Cumiana, where they held a common farm and where the musician returned often. He trained on the violin under Giovanni Battista Somis, founder of the Piedmontese school of violin playing. In 1752, Pugnani became the first violinist of the Royal Chapel of Turin, and then went on a large tour that granted him great fame for his extraordinary skill on the violin. In 1754, he was very well received at the Concert Spirituel in Paris, but in 1768 he had an even more successful musical encounter in London, directing the King's Theatre from 1767 to 1769. During these years Pugnani worked closely with Johann Christian Bach and Carl Friedrich Abel.

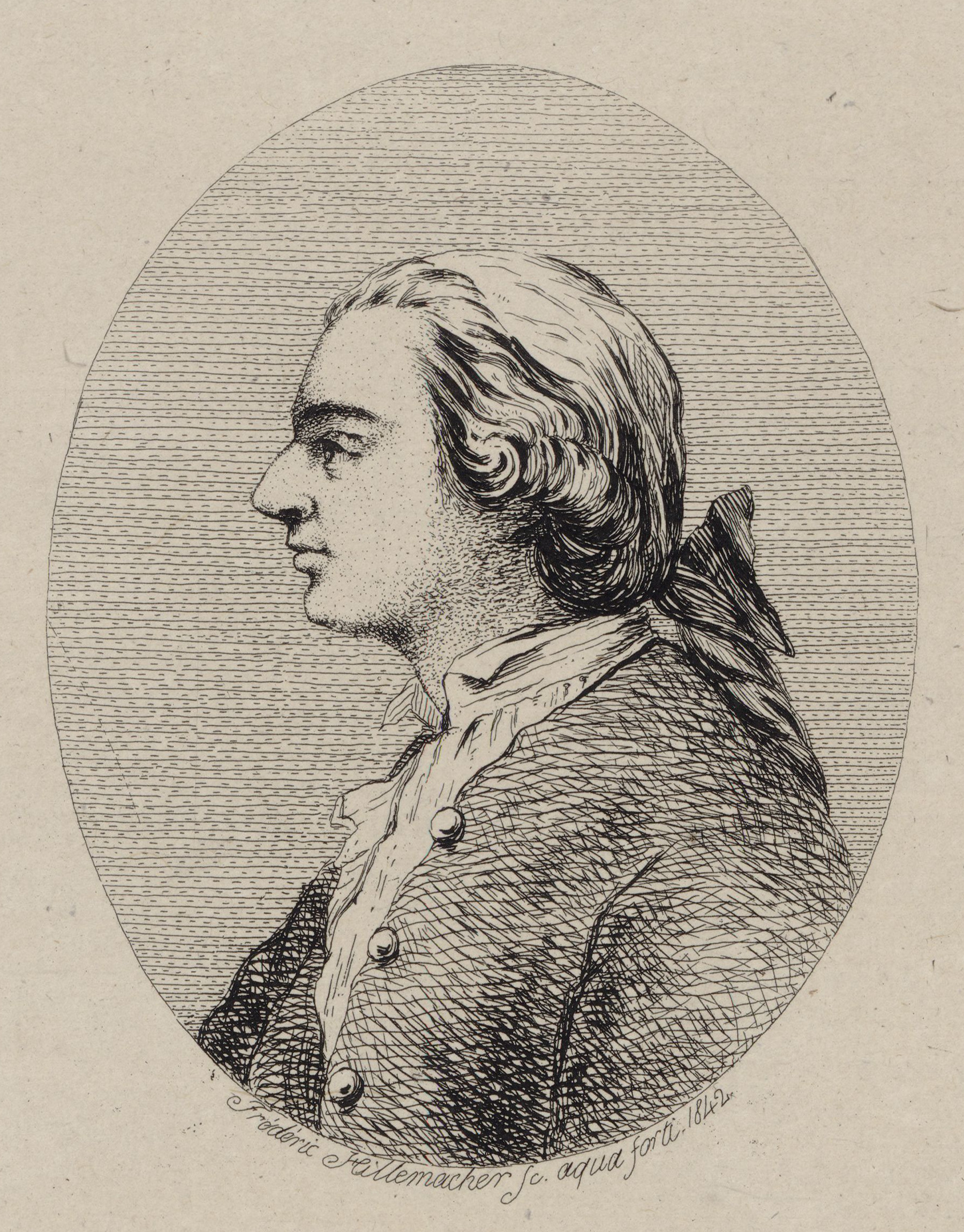
Gaetano Pugnani by Frédéric-Désiré Hillemacher

In 1770, Pugnani returned home to Turin and became the director of the Royal Chapel. Mozart and his father Leopold met Pugnani a year later when they visited Turin. His fame as a composer began to grow, but it would never equal his fame as a violinist. During this time, he also taught the violin. His most famous pupil was Giovanni Battista Viotti; in 1766 Viotti was placed at the cost of the Prince de la Cisterne under Pugnani. From 1780 to 1782 they performed in Switzerland, Dresden, Warsaw and St. Petersburg.

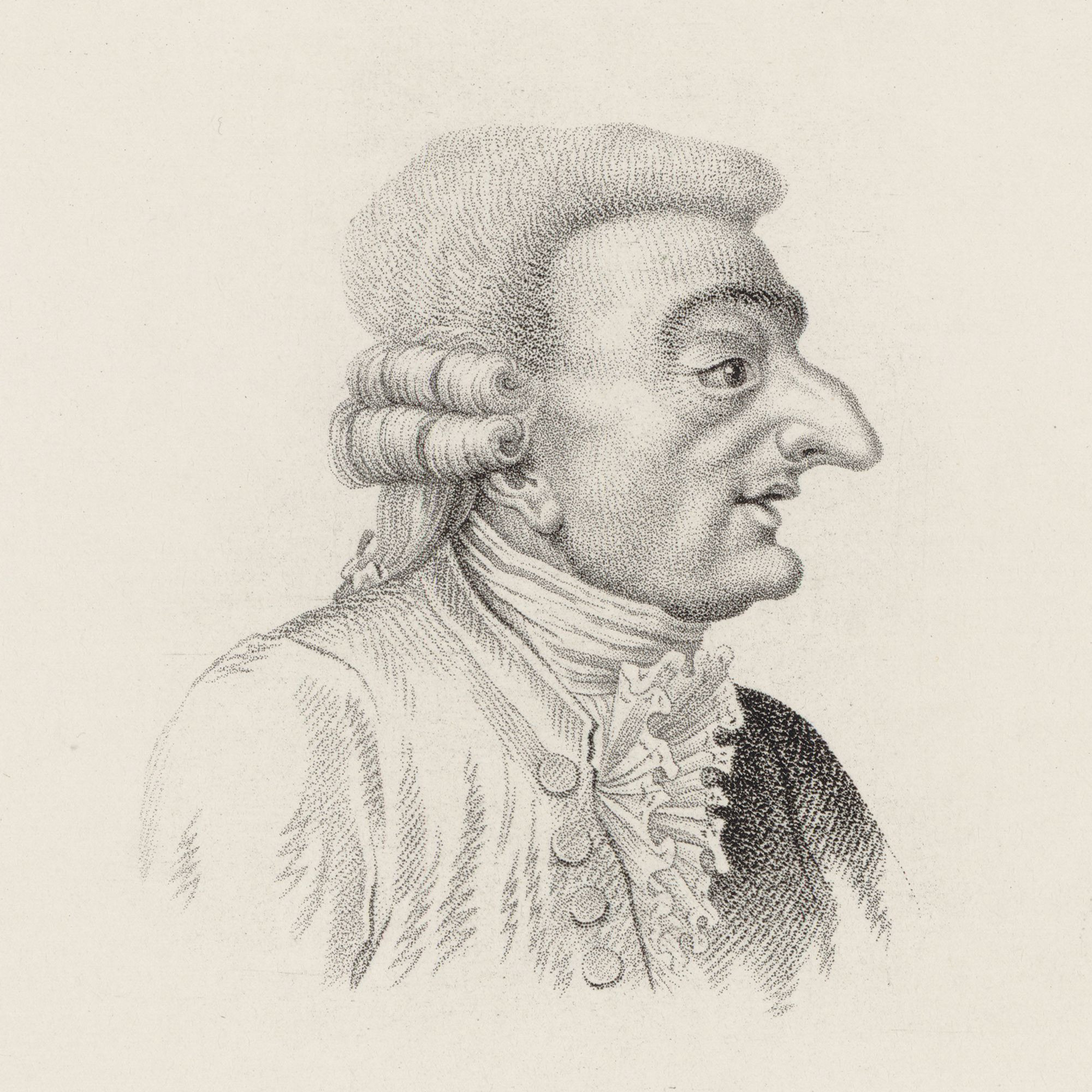
Gaetano Pugnani by Carl Traugott Riedel

Pugnani died in Turin in 1798. His funeral was modest as was his will and he was buried in the cemetery of St. Peter in Vincoli.

Fritz Kreisler borrowed Pugnani's name in order to publish some of his pieces (such as Praeludium and Allegro and Tempo di Minuetto), but in 1935 Kreisler revealed that these works were actually his own.

== Operas ==
Operas with music by Gaetano Pugnani:

- Nanetta e Lubino. Opera buffa, libretto by Carlo Francesco Badini, 1769. The first performance took place on 8 April 1769 at the King's Theatre, London
- Issea. Libretto by Vittorio Amadeo Cigna-Santi, 1771
- Tamas Kouli-Kan nell'Indie. Libretto by Vittorio Amadeo Cigna-Santi, 1772
- Aurora. Libretto by Giandomenico Boggio, 1775
- Achille in Sciro. Libretto by Pietro Metastasio, revised by Vittorio Amedeo Cigna-Santi, 1785. This opera, divided into 3 acts, was premiered at the Teatro Regio in Turin on 15 January.
- Demofoonte. Libretto by Pietro Metastasio, 1787. Opera in three acts premiered at the Teatro Regio in Turin on 26 December.
- Demetrio a Rodi. Libretto by Giandomenico Boggio and Giuseppe Banti, 1789
- La Betulia Liberata. Oratoria sacra, libretto by Pietro Metastasio. Dedicated to the Queen of Portugal. This opera was performed in 2012 by the Portuguese Symphonic Orquestra directed by Donato Renzetti, in collaboration with the musicologist Pietro Dossena.

== Chamber music ==
- 6 quintets for 2 flutes (oboes), 2 corni ad lib, 2 violins, basso continuo
- 6 quartets for strings
- 6 trios for harpsichord, violin and cello
- 18 sonatas for violin and continuo
  - 6 sonatas for violin and continuo, Op.3
  - 6 sonatas for violin and continuo, Op.7
  - 6 sonatas for violin and continuo, Op.8
- 6 sonatas for 2 violins
