= Alt-Wiener Tanzweisen =

Piece of music written by Fritz Kreisler

External audio
- Alt-Wiener Tanzweisen (Liebesfreud - Love's Joy), Liebesleid (Love's Sorrow) and Schön Rosmarin (Lovely Rosemary) performed by Fritz Kreisler in 1943

Alt-Wiener Tanzweisen (Old Viennese Dances in German) is a set of three short pieces for violin and piano composed by Austrian-American violinist Fritz Kreisler. The three pieces are titled Liebesfreud (Love's Joy), Liebesleid (Love's Sorrow), and Schön Rosmarin (Lovely Rosemary).

It is not known when the pieces are written, but they were published in 1905, deliberately misattributed to Joseph Lanner. The pieces had become parts of Kreisler's repertoire well before September 1910, when he copyrighted them under his own name.

Kreisler often played these pieces as encores at his concerts, though the pieces are usually performed separately.

In 1911, he published solo piano arrangements of the pieces as Alt-Wiener Tanzweisen. The pieces have since appeared in numerous settings for other instruments, or orchestrated.

Two of the pieces, Liebesleid and Liebesfreud, were the subject of virtuoso transcriptions for solo piano by Kreisler's friend Sergei Rachmaninoff, who also recorded these transcriptions. Although there is no recorded date of composition of either transcription, Liebesleid was first performed in Chicago on 20 November 1921, and Liebesfreud was first performed in Stamford, Connecticut on 29 October 1925.
