= Praeludium and Allegro =

Musical work by Fritz Kreisler

Praeludium and Allegro (in the style of Pugnani) is a piece for violin and piano written by Fritz Kreisler.

== History ==
The piece was first published in 1905, among other pieces the composer ascribed to lesser-known composers of the 18th century. It is now one of the most popular works in the violin repertoire, and an important step in the violin pedagogy.

In February 1935, Kriesler admitted that the work was his own, and not Pugnani's.
