= Fritz Kreisler =

Austrian and American violinist and composer (1875–1962)

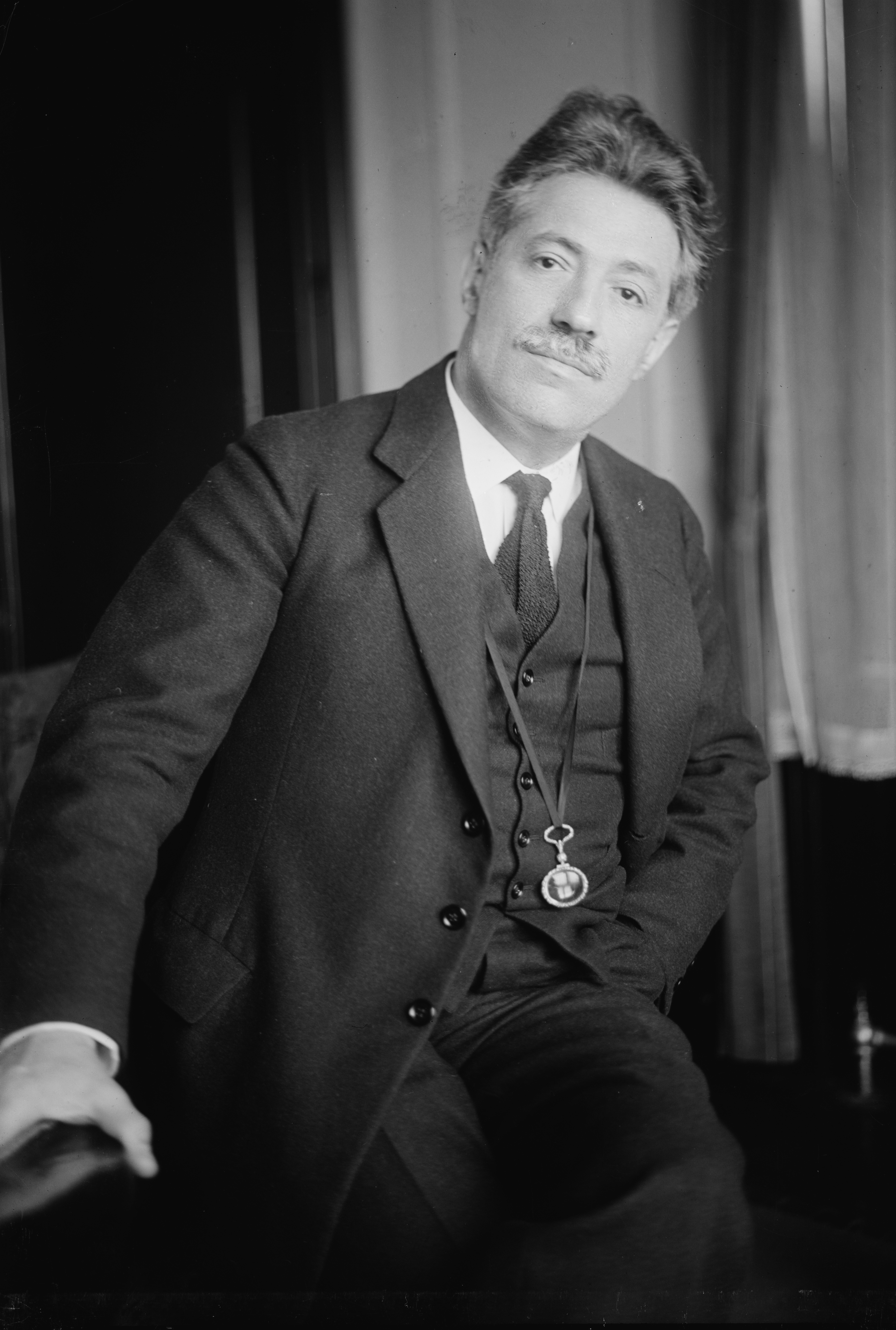
- Born: February 2, 1875; Vienna, Austria-Hungary
- Died: January 29, 1962 (aged 86); New York City, U.S.
- Occupations: Composer, violinist
- Years active: 1903–1950

External audio
- Listen to Fritz Kreisler performing Alt-Wiener Tanzweisen (Liebesfreud – Love's Joy), Liebesleid (Love's Sorrow) and Schön Rosmarin (Lovely Rosemary) in 1943 at archive.org

Friedrich "Fritz" Kreisler (February 2, 1875 – January 29, 1962) was an Austrian and American violinist and composer. One of the most distinguished violin virtuosi of his day, he was known for his sweet tone and expressive phrasing with marked portamento and rubato. Like many great violinists of his generation, he produced a characteristic sound which was immediately recognizable as his own. Although it derived in many respects from the Franco-Belgian school, his style is nonetheless reminiscent of the gemütlich (cozy) lifestyle of pre-war Vienna.

== Biography ==
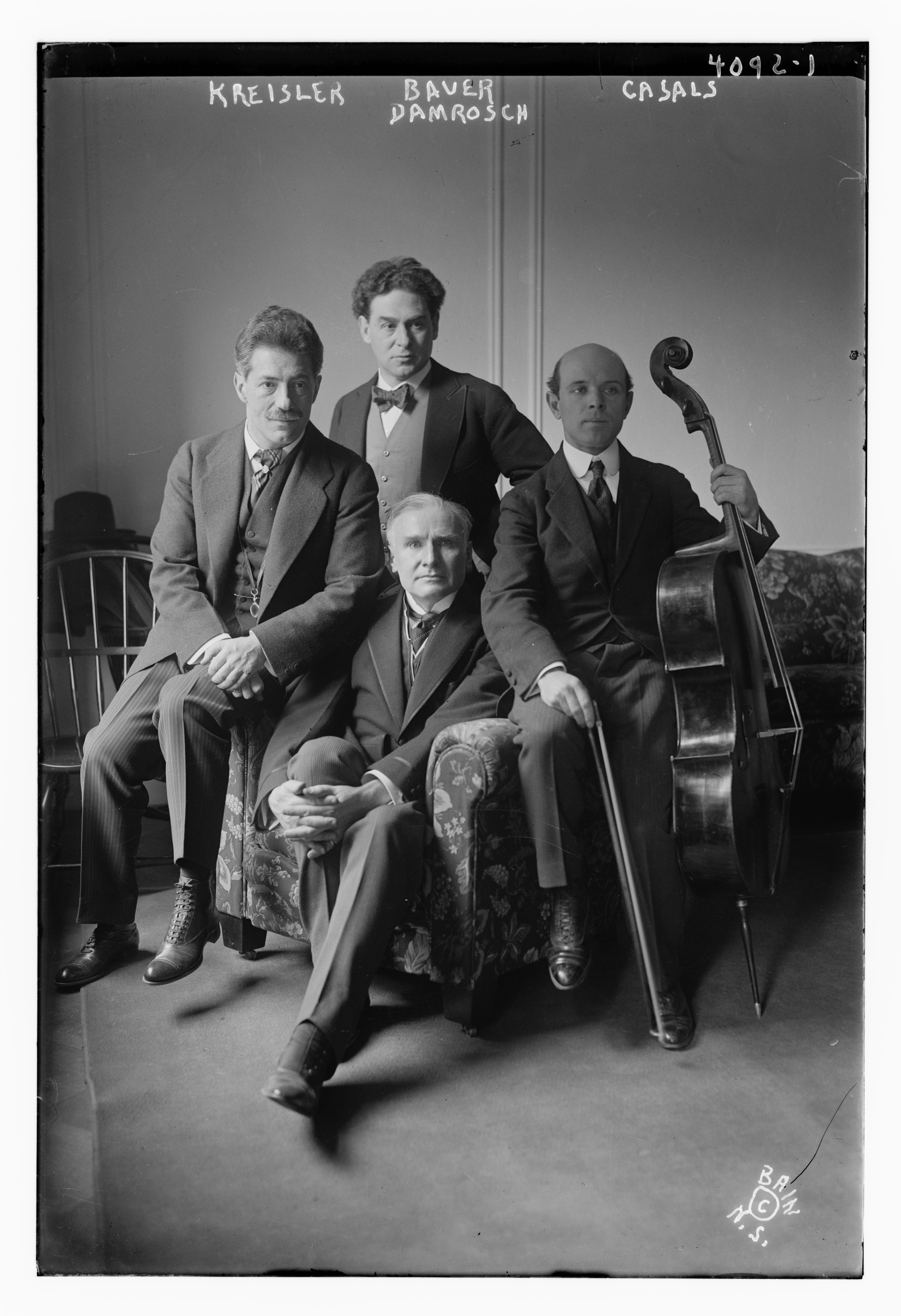
Kreisler, Harold Bauer, Pablo Casals, and Walter Damrosch at Carnegie Hall on March 13, 1917

Kreisler was born in Vienna, the son of Anna (née Reches) (Note: Her original Hebrew name, listed in her sons’ birth certificates was "Chaje Riwe" (rendered as "Chaje Ribe" in his brother Hugo's record).) and Samuel Kreisler, a doctor. Of Jewish descent, his mother was Roman Catholic and he was baptised Roman Catholic at the age of 12. At age seven, Kreisler entered the Vienna Conservatory where he studied under Anton Bruckner, Jakob Dont and Joseph Hellmesberger Jr., and studied composition and violin at the Paris Conservatory between 1885 and 1887, where his teachers included Léo Delibes, Lambert Massart and Jules Massenet. He graduated from the Paris Conservatory with the highest "Premier Prix" in violin at the age of 12, competing against 40 other players, most of whom were at least 20 years of age.

He made his United States debut at the Steinway Hall in New York City on November 10, 1888, and his first tour of the United States in 1888–1889 with Moriz Rosenthal. He then returned to Austria and applied for a position in the Vienna Philharmonic, but was turned down by the concertmaster Arnold Rosé. As a result, he left music to study medicine. He spent a brief time in the army before returning to the violin in 1899, when he gave a concert with the Berlin Philharmonic conducted by Arthur Nikisch. It was this concert and a series of American tours from 1901 to 1903 that brought him real acclaim. Kreisler was also an excellent pianist, and his piano playing is preserved on Ampico reproducing piano rolls.

During a concert tour of the United States in 1901, Kreisler met Harriet Lies, a New York-born divorcée who was a Vassar graduate and the daughter of a German American tobacco merchant. They fell in love immediately and were married a year later, though they repeated the ceremony three more times because of legal technicalities. They had no children, and Harriet devoted her life to his career. They were married for 60 years, until his death in 1962. They both died devout Roman Catholics

In 1910, Kreisler gave the premiere of Sir Edward Elgar's Violin Concerto, a work commissioned by and dedicated to him. He served briefly in the Austrian Army in World War I before being honourably discharged after he was wounded. He arrived in New York on November 24, 1914, and spent the remainder of the war years in America. He returned to Europe in 1924, living first in Berlin, then moving to France in 1938. Shortly thereafter, at the outbreak of World War II, he settled once again in the United States, becoming a naturalized citizen in 1943. He lived there for the rest of his life, giving his last public concert in 1947, and broadcasting performances for a few years after that.

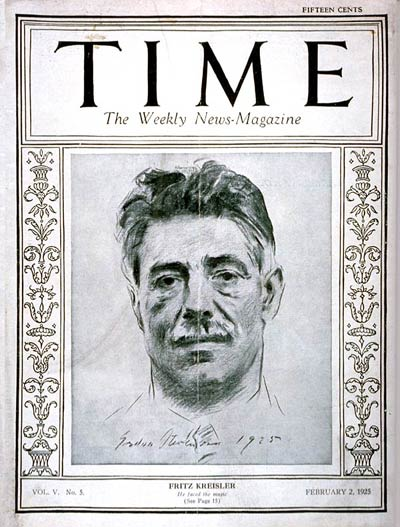
Time cover, February 2, 1925

On April 26, 1941, he was involved in a serious traffic accident. Struck by a truck while crossing a street in New York, he suffered a fractured skull and was in a coma for over a week.

In his later years, he suffered from not only some hearing loss but also sight deterioration due to cataracts.

Kreisler died in New York City in 1962 of a heart condition aggravated by old age. He was interred in a private mausoleum in Woodlawn Cemetery, the Bronx, New York City.

== Legacy ==
Kreisler wrote a number of pieces for the violin, including solos for encores, such as "Liebesleid" and "Liebesfreud". Some of Kreisler's compositions were pastiches ostensibly in the style of other composers. They were originally ascribed to earlier composers, such as Gaetano Pugnani, Giuseppe Tartini and Antonio Vivaldi, and then, in 1935, Kreisler revealed that it was he who wrote the pieces. When critics complained, Kreisler replied that they had already deemed the compositions worthy: "The name changes, the value remains", he said. He also wrote operettas, including Apple Blossoms in 1919 and Sissy in 1932, a string quartet, and cadenzas, including ones for Brahms's Violin Concerto, Paganini's D major Violin Concerto, and Beethoven's Violin Concerto. His cadenzas for the Beethoven concerto are the ones most often played by violinists today.

He wrote the music for the 1936 movie The King Steps Out directed by Josef von Sternberg, based on the early years of Empress Elisabeth of Austria.

Kreisler performed and recorded his own version of the first movement of Paganini's D major Violin Concerto. The movement is rescored and in some places reharmonised, and the orchestral introduction is completely rewritten in some places. The overall effect is of a late-nineteenth-century work.

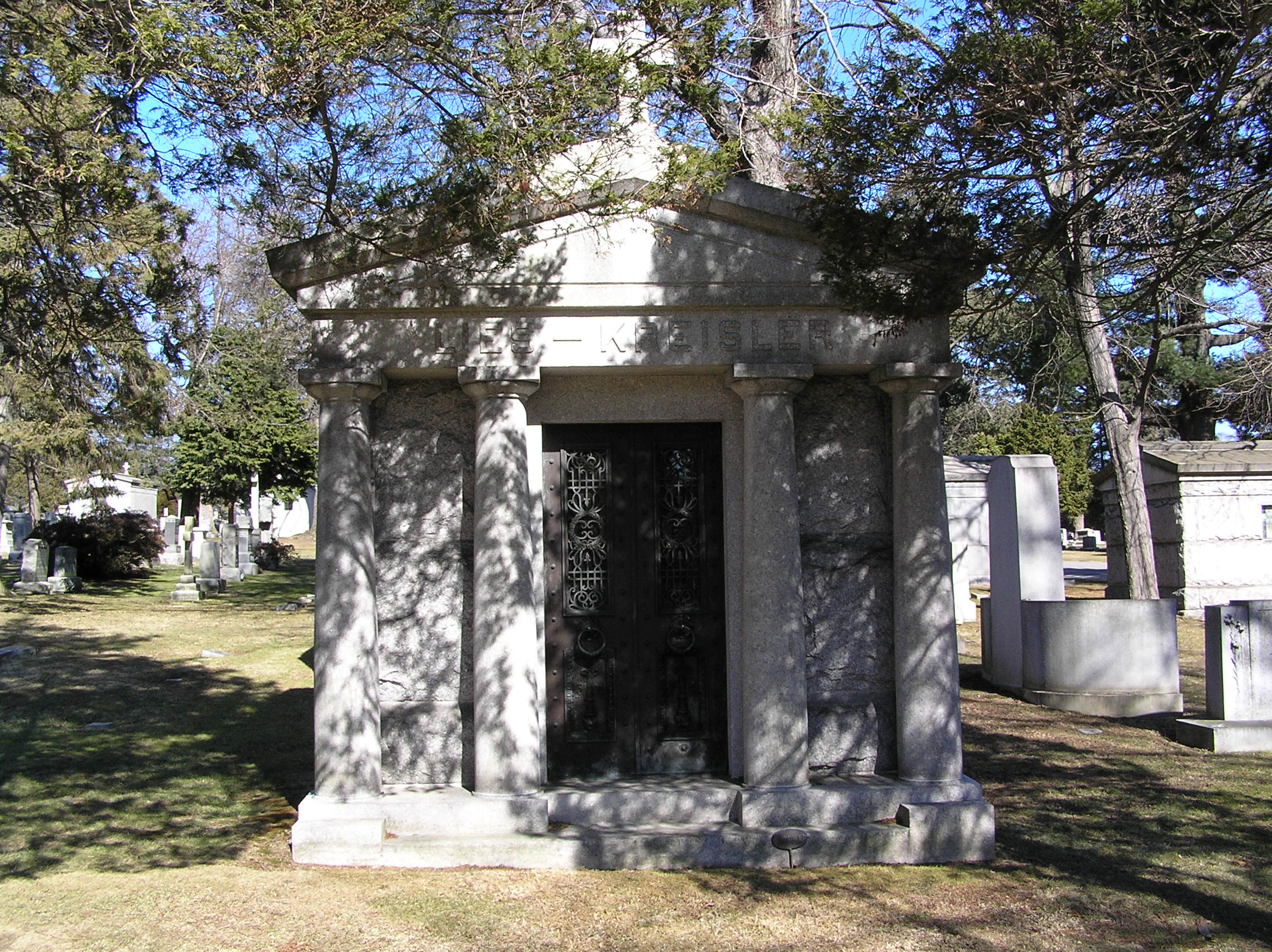
The mausoleum of Kreisler in Woodlawn Cemetery

External audio
- Listen to Fritz Kreisler performing Ludwig van Beethoven's Violin Concerto in D major, Op. 61 with John Barbirolli conducting the London Philharmonic in 1936 at archive.org

Kreisler owned several antique violins made by luthiers Antonio Stradivari, Pietro Guarneri, Giuseppe Guarneri, and Carlo Bergonzi, most of which eventually came to bear his name. He also owned a Jean-Baptiste Vuillaume violin of 1860, which he often used as his second violin, and which he often lent to the young prodigy Josef Hassid. In 1952 he donated his Giuseppe Guarneri to the Library of Congress in Washington, D.C. where it remains in use for performances given in the library.

On recordings, Kreisler's style resembles that of his younger contemporary Mischa Elman, with a tendency toward expansive tempi, a continuous and varied vibrato, expressive phrasing, and a melodic approach to passage-work. Kreisler makes considerable use of portamento and rubato. The two violinists' approaches are less similar in big works of the standard repertoire, such as Felix Mendelssohn's Violin Concerto, than in smaller pieces.

A trip to a Kreisler concert is recounted in Siegfried Sassoon's 1928 autobiographical novel Memoirs of a Fox-Hunting Man.

The Australian manufacturer of electronics and consumer goods Kriesler (later a subsidiary of Philips) supposedly took its name after Fritz Kreisler but had intentionally misspelled the name as to avoid possible juristical actions from other parties.

== Work ==
=== Forgeries ===
Kreisler created a number of musical forgeries throughout his career. These include

  - Sicilienne and Rigaudon by François Francœur.
  - Allegretto by "Luigi Boccherini"
  - Andantino by "Giovanni Battista Martini"
  - Aubade Provençale by "Louis Couperin"
  - Chanson Louis XIII and Pavane by "Louis Couperin"
  - La Chasse (Caprice) by "Jean Baptiste Cartier"
  - Grave by "Wilhelm Friedemann Bach"
  - Menuett by "Nicola Porpora"
  - Praeludium and Allegro by "Gaetano Pugnani"
  - La Précieuse by "Louis Couperin"
  - Preghiera by "Giovanni Battista Martini"
  - Scherzo by "Carl Ditters von Dittersdorf"
  - Sicilienne and Rigaudon by "François Francoeur"
  - Study on a Choral by "Johann Stamitz"
  - Tempo di Minuetto by "Gaetano Pugnani"
  - Variations on a Theme by Corelli by "Giuseppe Tartini"
  - Violin Concerto in C major by "Antonio Vivaldi"

=== Recordings ===
Kreisler recorded extensively for Victor/RCA Victor and His Master's Voice. His recordings have been reasonably well represented on both LP and CD reissues. His final recordings were made in 1950.

- Bach Concerto for Two Violins in D minor, BWV 1043, with Efrem Zimbalist (second violin), and a string quartet. rec. January 4, 1915;
- Beethoven Violin Concerto in D major, Op. 61, with Leo Blech, Berlin State Opera Orchestra. rec. December 15, 1926;
- Beethoven Violin Concerto in D major, Op. 61, with John Barbirolli, London Philharmonic Orchestra. rec. June 16, 1936;
- Beethoven Sonata No. 8 in G major, Op. 30, No. 3, with Sergei Rachmaninoff, pF. rec. March 22, 1928;
- Beethoven Sonata No. 9 in A major, Op. 47, with Franz Rupp, pf. rec. June 17–19, 1936;
- Brahms Violin Concerto in D major, Op. 77 with Leo Blech, Berlin State Opera Orchestra, rec. November 21, 1927;
- Brahms Violin Concerto in D major, Op. 77 with John Barbirolli, London Symphony Orchestra, rec. June 18, 1936;
- Grieg Sonata No. 3 in C minor, Op. 45, with Sergei Rachmaninoff, pf. rec. December 14–15, 1928;
- Mendelssohn Violin Concerto in E minor, Op. 64, with Leo Blech, Berlin State Opera Orchestra. rec. December 9, 1926;
- Mendelssohn Violin Concerto in E minor, Op. 64, with Landon Ronald, London Symphony Orch. rec. April 8, 1935;
- Mozart Violin Concerto in D major, K. 218, with Landon Ronald, London Symphony Orchestra, rec. December 1, 1924;
- Paganini Violin Concerto in D major, Op. 6 (recomposed by Kreisler), with Eugene Ormandy, Philadelphia Orchestra, rec. December 13, 1936;
- Schubert Sonata No. 5 in A major, D. 574, with Sergei Rachmaninoff, pf. rec. December 20, 1928;
- attrib. Vivaldi, RV Anh. 62 (composed by Kreisler) Violin Concerto in C major, with Donald Voorhees, RCA Victor Orchestra, rec. May 2, 1945.

=== Broadway ===
La Gitana
Composed in 1917 after an 18th century Arabo-Spanish Romani song. Performed by Carrie Rehkopf (2:54)

- Apple Blossoms (1919) – operetta – co-composer;
- Continental Varieties (1934) – revue – featured composer for "Caprice Viennois" and "La Gitana";
- Reunion in New York (1940) – revue – featured composer for "Stars in Your Eyes";
- Rhapsody (1944) – operetta – composer.

=== Autobiography ===
- Kreisler, Fritz (1915). Four Weeks in the Trenches. Boston, New York: Houghton Mifflin. OCLC 1161448.

== See also ==
- List of Austrians in music

== Further sources ==
- "John McCormack, Great Irish Tenor, in Houston Thursday". The Houston Post. December 5, 1915. p. 29 – via Newspapers.com.

Awards and achievements
Preceded by Charles B. Warren	Cover of Time magazine February 2, 1925	Succeeded by William Mackenzie King
