= 1913 in music =

This is a list of notable events in music that took place in the year 1913.

== Specific locations ==
- 1913 in British music
- 1913 in Norwegian music

== Specific genres ==
- 1913 in jazz

== Events ==
- February 5 – Claudio Monteverdi's last opera L'incoronazione di Poppea is performed theatrically for the first time in more than 250 years, in Paris.
- March 9 – The second performance of Francesco Balilla Pratella's Musica Futurista in Rome becomes the first of several pieces this year of classical music with an unruly audience response.
- March 31 – Skandalkonzert: A concert at the Musikverein in Vienna with Arnold Schoenberg conducting music by himself and his pupils Alban Berg and Anton Webern, particularly Berg's Altenberg Lieder, provokes fisticuffs and is abandoned.
- April 1 – Manuel de Falla's opera La vida breve is given its world première in Nice.
- May 29 – The ballet The Rite of Spring, with music by Igor Stravinsky conducted by Pierre Monteux and choreography by Vaslav Nijinsky is premièred by Sergei Diaghilev's Ballets Russes at the Théâtre des Champs-Élysées in Paris, its modernism provoking one of the most famous classical music riots in history. The audience includes Gabriele D'Annunzio, Coco Chanel, Marcel Duchamp, Harry Graf Kessler and Maurice Ravel. Police are called during the interval.
- September 5 – Sergei Prokofiev's performance of the first version of his Piano Concerto No. 2 at Pavlovsk, Saint Petersburg, is met with hisses and catcalls.
- September 10 – Jean Sibelius's tone poem Luonnotar is premiered at the Three Choirs Festival in Gloucester Cathedral, England, with soprano Aino Ackté and orchestra conducted by Herbert Brewer.
- October – Edison Diamond Disc Record introduced.
- The term "Jazz" first appears in print (in the San Francisco Bulletin).
- Louis Armstrong begins playing the cornet, in the band of the New Orleans Colored Waifs' Home.
- Lili Boulanger becomes the first woman to win the Musical Composition section of the Prix de Rome, with her cantata Faust et Hélène.
- The Aeolian Company introduces the Duo-Art piano technology.
- Edward Bairstow becomes organist of York Minster.

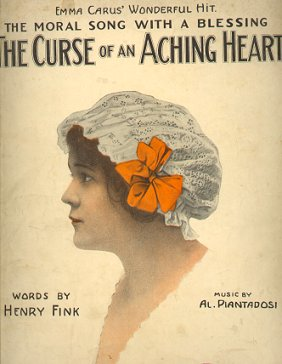

== Published popular music ==
- "Abie Sings An Irish Song": words & music by Irving Berlin
- "All Aboard For Dixieland": words Jack Yellen, music George L. Cobb
- "And Then", w. Alfred Bryan, m. Herman Paley
- "The Angelus", w. Robert B. Smith, w. Victor Herbert
- "Asia" by E. Ray Goetz
- "At The Ball, That's All" by J. Leubrie Hill
- "Ay, Ay, Ay!" by Osmán Pérez Freire
- "Ballin' the Jack", w. James Henry Burris, m. Chris Smith
- "Brighten The Corner Where You Are" w. Ina Duley Ogdon m. Charles H. Gabriel
- "The Bubble" by Otto Harbach
- "Crazy Bone Rag" m. Charles L. Johnson
- "The Cricket On The Hearth" w. Robert B. Smith m. Victor Herbert
- "'Cross The Great Divide" w. Sam M. Lewis m. George W. Meyer
- "The Curse Of An Aching Heart" w. Henry Fink m. Al Piantadosi
- "Daddy, Come Home" w.m. Irving Berlin
- "Danny Boy" w. Frederic Weatherly m. trad
- "Don't Blame It All On Broadway" w. Joe Young & Harry Williams m. Bert Grant
- "Down In Chattanooga" w.m. Irving Berlin
- "El Cóndor Pasa" by Daniel Alomía Robles
- "Fat Li'l' Feller Wid His Mammy's Eyes" w.m. Sheridan Gordon & F. L. Stanton
- "Fifteen Cents" by Chris Smith
- "Gasoline" w. J. Will Callahan (1874–1946), m. Paul Pratt (1890–1948)
- "Goodbye Boys" w. Andrew B. Sterling & William Jerome m. Harry Von Tilzer
- "Happy Little Country Girl" w.m. Irving Berlin
- "He'd Have to Get Under — Get Out and Get Under (to Fix Up His Automobile)" w. Grant Clark & Edgar Leslie m. Maurice Abrahams
- "Hello, Honey" w. George V. Hobart m. Raymond Hubbell. Introduced by Elizabeth Brice in the revue Ziegfeld Follies of 1913
- "Hungarian Rag" m. Julius Lenzberg
- "I Can Live Without You" w. Gene Buck m. Dave Stamper
- "I Miss You Most Of All" w.m. Joseph McCarthy Sr. & James V. Monaco
- "If I Had My Way" w. Lou Klein m. James Kendis
- "I'll Change The Shadows To Sunshine" w. George Graff Jr. m. Ernest R. Ball
- "I'll Get You" w. Will D. Cobb m. Gus Edwards
- "I'm On My Way To Mandalay" w. Al Bryan m. Fred Fisher
- "The Incandescent Rag" m. George Botsford
- "The International Rag" w.m. Irving Berlin
- "Isle D'Amour" w. Earl Carroll m. Leo Edwards
- "It's Nice To Get Up In The Morning" w.m. Harry Lauder
- "Just For Tonight" w.m. George L. Cobb
- "Keep On Walking" w.m. Irving Berlin
- "Lion Tamer Rag" m. Mark Janza
- "Look In Her Eyes" w. M. E. Rourke m. Jerome Kern
- "Marcheta" by Victor Schertzinger
- "Melinda's Wedding Day" Berlin
- "My Little Moonlight Maid" w. W. R. Williams m. Spencer Williams
- "Never Mind" w.m. Harry Dent & Tom Goldburn
- "The Old Maids' Ball" w.m. Irving Berlin
- "On the Old Fall River Line" w. William Jerome & Andrew B. Sterling m. Harry Von Tilzer
- "Panama" w. George V. Hobart m. Raymond Hubbell
- "Peg O' My Heart" w. Alfred Bryan m. Fred Fisher
- "The Pullman Porters On Parade" w. Ren G. May m. Maurice Abrahams
- "Rebecca Of Sunnybrook Farm" w. A. Seymour Brown m. Albert Gumble
- "Sailing Down The Chesapeake Bay" George Botsford & Jean C. Harvez
- "San Francisco Bound" w.m. Irving Berlin
- "Snookey Ookums" w.m. Irving Berlin
- "Somebody's Coming To My House" w.m. Irving Berlin
- "Something Seems Tingle-Ingling" w. Otto Harbach m. Rudolf Friml
- "The Sunshine of Your Smile" w. Leonard Cooke m. Lilian Ray
- "Sweethearts" w. Robert B. Smith m. Victor Herbert
- "Take Me to Roseland, My Beautiful Rose" w. Jack Strouse & Ed Johnson m. Nat Osbrone
- "There's A Girl In The Heart Of Maryland" w. Ballard MacDonald m. Harry Carroll
- "There's a Long, Long Trail" w. Stoddard King m. Alonzo Elliot
- "There Is Power in a Union" w. Joe Hill m. Lewis E. Jones
- "They've Got Me Doin' It Now" w.m. Irving Berlin
- "Too-Ra-Loo-Ra-Loo-Ral (That's an Irish Lullaby)" w.m. James Royce Shannon
- "The Trail of the Lonesome Pine" w. Ballard MacDonald m. Harry Carroll
- "Tra-La, La, La!" w.m. Irving Berlin
- "We Have Much To Be Thankful For" w.m. Irving Berlin
- "Welcome Home" w.m. Irving Berlin
- "When You Play In The Game Of Love" w. Joe Goodwin m. Al Piantadosi
- "When You're All Dressed Up And No Place To Go" w. Benjamin Hapgood Burt m. Silvio Hein
- "Where Did You Get That Girl?" w. Bert Kalmar m. Harry Puck
- "You Made Me Love You" w. Joseph McCarthy m. James V. Monaco
- "You're Here And I'm Here" w. Harry B. Smith m. Jerome Kern
- "You've Got Your Mother's Big Blue Eyes" w.m. Irving Berlin

== Popular recordings ==
- "The Spaniard That Blighted My Life" by Al Jolson
- "Till the Sands of the Desert Grow Cold" by Alan Turner
- "When the Midnight Choo-Choo Leaves for Alabam'" by Collins & Harlan
- "Cohen on the Telephone" – Ethnic humor
- "It's Nicer To Be In Bed" by Harry Lauder

== Classical music ==
- Alban Berg – 4 Stücke, Op. 5
- George Butterworth – Banks of Green Willow
- John Alden Carpenter – Violin Sonata
- Mario Castelnuovo-Tedesco – Questo fu il carro della morte, Op. 2
- Claude Debussy
  - La boîte à joujoux (ballet)
  - Syrinx
  - Trois poèmes de Stéphane Mallarmé
- Frederick Delius – I-Brasil, RT V/28
- Gustav Holst – St Paul's Suite
- Paul von Klenau
  - Symphony No. 3
  - Symphony No. 4 (Dante-Symphony)
  - Paolo und Francesca (symphonic fantasy)
- Fritz Kreisler – Allegretto in the Style of Porpora
- Nikolai Medtner – 4 Fairy Tales, Op.26
- Morfydd Owen – Nocturne
- Sergey Prokofiev – Piano Concerto No.2, Op.16 (original version, lost in the Russian Revolution)
- Sergei Rachmaninoff
  - The Bells (Choral symphony), premiered November 30 in St. Petersburg.
  - Piano Sonata No.2, Op.36 (first version)
- Maurice Ravel
  - Daphnis et Chloé Suite No.2, M. 57b
  - À la manière de Borodine, M. 63
  - À la manière de Chabrier, M. 63
  - Prélude in A minor, M.65
  - Trois Poèmes de Stéphane Mallarmé
- Max Reger
  - Introduction, Passacaglia und Fuge, Op.127
  - 4 Tone Poems after Arnold Böcklin, Op.128
  - 9 Stücke, Op.129
- Ottorino Respighi – Ouverture carnevalesca
- Erik Satie
  - Chapitres tournés en tous sens
  - Descriptions automatiques
- F. Xaver Scharwenka – Eglantine waltz
- Arnold Schoenberg – Gurre-Lieder (first performed/published; composed 1900–1911)
- Jean Sibelius – The Bard
- Igor Stravinsky – The Rite of Spring
- Germaine Tailleferre – Berceuse for violin and piano in E major
- Ralph Vaughan Williams – A London Symphony (Symphony No. 2)
- Louis Vierne – Messe basse, Op. 30
- Anton Webern
  - Six Bagatelles, Op. 9, for string quartet
  - Five Pieces for orchestra
  - Three Pieces for string quartet and mezzo-soprano
- Kōsaku Yamada – Flower of Mandala, symphonic poem

== Opera ==
- Manuel de Falla – La vida breve
- Gabriel Fauré – Pénélope
- Enrique Granados – Goyescas
- Jules Massenet – Panurge
- Italo Montemezzi – L'amore dei tre re (The Love of the Three Kings)
- Modest Mussorgsky – The Fair at Sorochyntsi (Sorochinskaya yarmarka) (incomplete)
- Uzeyir Hajibeyov – Arshin Mal Alan (operetta)
- Paul von Klenau – Sulamith
- Ermanno Wolf-Ferrari – L'amore medico, premiered December 4 in Dresden

== Musical theater ==
- Adele – Broadway production opened at the Longacre Theatre on August 28 and ran for 196 performances
- The American Maid – Broadway production
- The Girl from Utah – London production opened at the Adelphi Theatre on October 18 and ran for 195 performances
- The Girl on the Film – London production opened at the Gaiety Theatre on April 5 and ran for 232 performances
- The Girl on the Film – Broadway production opened at the 44th Street Theatre on December 29 and ran for 64 performances
- The Honeymoon Express – Broadway production opened at the Winter Garden Theatre on February 6 and ran for 156 performances
- Hullo, Tango – London production opened at the Hippodrome on December 23
- The Isle o' Dreams – Broadway production opened at the Grand Opera House on January 27 and ran for 32 performances
- The Laughing Husband – London production opened at the New Theatre on October 2.
- The Little Café – Broadway production opened at the New Amsterdam Theatre on November 10 and ran for 144 performances
- The Madcap Duchess (Music: Victor Herbert) – Broadway production opened at the Globe Theatre on November 11 and ran for 71 performances. Starring Ann Swinburne, Peggy Wood and Glenn Hall
- Der Mädchenmarkt – Vienna production opened at the Carltheater on May 7
- The Marriage Market – London production opened at Daly's Theatre on May 17 and ran for 423 performances
- The Pearl Girl – London production opened at the Shaftesbury Theatre on September 25 and ran for 254 performances
- The Pleasure Seekers (Music: E. Ray Goetz) – Broadway production opened at the Winter Garden Theatre on November 3, starring William J. Montgomery and Florence Moore, and ran for 72 performances.
- The Sunshine Girl – Broadway production opened at the Knickerbocker Theatre on February 3 and ran for 160 performances
- Sweethearts – Broadway production opened at the New Amsterdam Theatre on September 8 and transferred to the Liberty Theatre on November 10 for a total run of 272 performances
- Ziegfeld Follies of 1913 – Broadway revue opened at the New Amsterdam Theatre on June 16 and ran for 108 performances

== Births ==
- January 22 – Sid Bass, songwriter (d. 1993)
- January 24 – Norman Dello Joio, American composer (d. 2008)
- January 25 – Witold Lutosławski, composer (d. 1994)
- January 26 – Jimmy Van Heusen, American composer (d. 1990)
- January 27
  - Milton Adolphus, pianist and composer (d. 1988)
  - Jack Brymer, English clarinettist (d. 2003)
- January 31 – Pedro Jústiz "Peruchín", Cuban pianist (d. 1977)
- February 4 – Yam Kim-fai, Cantonese opera singer (d. 1989)
- March 2 – Celedonio Romero, guitarist, composer and poet (d. 1996)
- March 4 – Willie Johnson, guitarist (d. 1995)
- March 5 – Gangubai Hangal, Indian classical singer (d. 2009)
- March 13
  - Smoky Dawson, Australian singer (d. 2008)
  - Libero de Luca, operatic tenor (d. 1997)
  - Sergey Mikhalkov, Russian lyricist (d. 2009)
- March 29 – Pappukutty Bhagavathar, Indian actor and singer (d. 2020)
- March 30 – Frankie Laine, singer (d. 2007)
- March 31 – Etta Baker, blues guitarist and singer (d. 2006)
- April 4 – Gene Ramey, jazz musician (d. 1984)
- April 14 – Jean Fournet, French conductor (d. 2008)
- May 1 – Walter Susskind, Czech conductor (d. 1980)
- May 6
  - Carmen Cavallaro, pianist (d. 1989)
  - Gyula Dávid, composer (d. 1977)
- May 12 – Jamelão, samba singer (d. 2008)
- May 16 – Woody Herman, US jazz musician and bandleader (d. 1987)
- May 21 – Gina Bachauer, pianist (d. 1976)
- May 18 – Charles Trenet, French singer, actor and songwriter (d. 2001)
- June 10 – Tikhon Khrennikov, Russian composer (d. 2007)
- June 11 – Risë Stevens, American mezzo-soprano (d. 2013)
- June 12 – Nina Mae McKinney, dancer and actress (d. 1967)
- June 13 – Joy Boughton, English oboist (died 1963)
- June 18 – Sammy Cahn, songwriter (d. 1993)
- June 23 – Helen Humes, US singer (d. 1981)
- June 28 – George Lloyd, composer (d. 1998)
- July 12 – Reino Helismaa, singer-songwriter (d. 1965)
- July 15 – Cowboy Copas, country singer (d. 1963)
- July 22 – Gorni Kramer, Italian bandleader (d. 1995)
- August 2
  - Hal Block, American songwriter (d. 1981)
  - Edric Connor, Trinidadian calypso singer (d. 1968)
- August 8 – Axel Stordahl, American arranger, best known for his collaborations with Frank Sinatra (d. 1963)
- August 28 – Robert Irving, British conductor (d. 1991)
- August 29
  - Jan Ekier, Polish pianist and composer (d. 2014)
  - Sylvia Fine, American songwriter (d. 1991)
- September 6 – Julie Gibson, American actress and singer (d. 2019)
- September 17 – Jørgen Jersild, Danish composer and music educator (d. 2004)
- September 20 – John Collins, jazz guitarist (d. 2001)
- September 23 -Alexi Matchavariani, Georgian,(Soviet) Composer,(d.31/12/1995)
- September 26 – Dorothy Sloop, jazz musician (d. 1998)
- October 15 – David Carroll, songwriter and conductor (d. 2008)
- October 16 – Gino Bechi, operatic bass-baritone (d. 1993)
- October 19
  - John Blackburn, lyricist (d. 2006)
  - Vinicius de Moraes, Brazilian lyricist (d. 1980)
- October 24 – Tito Gobbi, operatic baritone (d. 1984)
- October 26 – Charlie Barnet, US bandleader (d. 1991)
- November 2 – Harry Babbitt, US singer with Kay Kyser & his orchestra (d. 2004)
- November 3 – Marika Rökk, singer, dancer and actress (d. 2004)
- November 8 – June Havoc, vaudeville performer and film star (d. 2010)
- November 11 – Ivy Benson, bandleader (d. 1993)
- November 15 – Gus Johnson, jazz drummer (d. 2000)
- November 19 – Blue Barron, orchestra leader (d. 2005)
- November 22 – Benjamin Britten, composer (d. 1976)
- November 23 – Raymond Hanson, composer and teacher (d. 1976)
- December 1 – Mary Martin, US singer and actress (d. 1990)
- December 6 – Karl Haas, editor and musicologist (died 2005)
- December 10 – Morton Gould, composer, conductor and arranger (d. 1996)
- December 14 – Rosalyn Tureck, pianist and harpsichordist (d. 2003)
- December 30 – Lucio Agostini, conductor and composer (d. 1996)

== Deaths ==
- January 24 – Gustav Carl Luders, composer (b. 1865)
- February 10 – Arseny Golenishchev-Kutuzov, lyricist (born 1848)
- February 26 – Felix Draeseke, composer (b. 1835)
- March 19
  - Géza Allaga, composer, cellist and cymbalist (b. 1841)
  - John Thomas, harpist and composer (b. 1826)
- March 20 – Christian Barnekow, Danish composer (b. 1837)
- April 4 – Alessandro Parisotti, composer and music writer (b. 1853)
- May 5 – Helen Carte, theatre impresario (b. 1852)
- June 3 – Josef Richard Rozkošný, pianist and composer (b. 1833)
- June 6 – Mary Seney Sheldon, first female president of the New York Philharmonic (b. 1863)
- June 17 – Ingeborg Bronsart von Schellendorf, Swedish-German composer (b. 1840)
- July 4 – Nadezhda Zabela-Vrubel, Ukrainian-Russian operatic soprano (b. 1868)
- July 16 – Sigismund Bachrich, violinist and composer (b. 1841)
- July 17 – Armes Beaumont, singer (b. 1842)
- August 7 – David Popper, cellist and composer (b. 1843)
- August 11 – Brasílio Itiberê da Cunha, lawyer, diplomat and composer
- August 26 – Michael Maybrick, composer and singer (b. 1841)
- September 13 – Alfred R. Gaul, conductor and composer (b. 1837)
- September 17 – Alfred Sormann, pianist and composer (b. 1861)
- September 22 – Eliakum Zunser, poet and songwriter (b. 1835)
- October 20
  - Charles Brookfield, theatre writer (b. 1857)
  - Polk Miller, banjo player and folk musician (b. 1844)
- November 3 – Hans Bronsart von Schellendorff, pianist and composer (b. 1830)
- December 6 – Alexander Hurley, music hall performer (b. 1871)
- date unknown – Ludwig Milde, composer of bassoon music (b. 1849)
