= List of songs written by Irving Berlin =

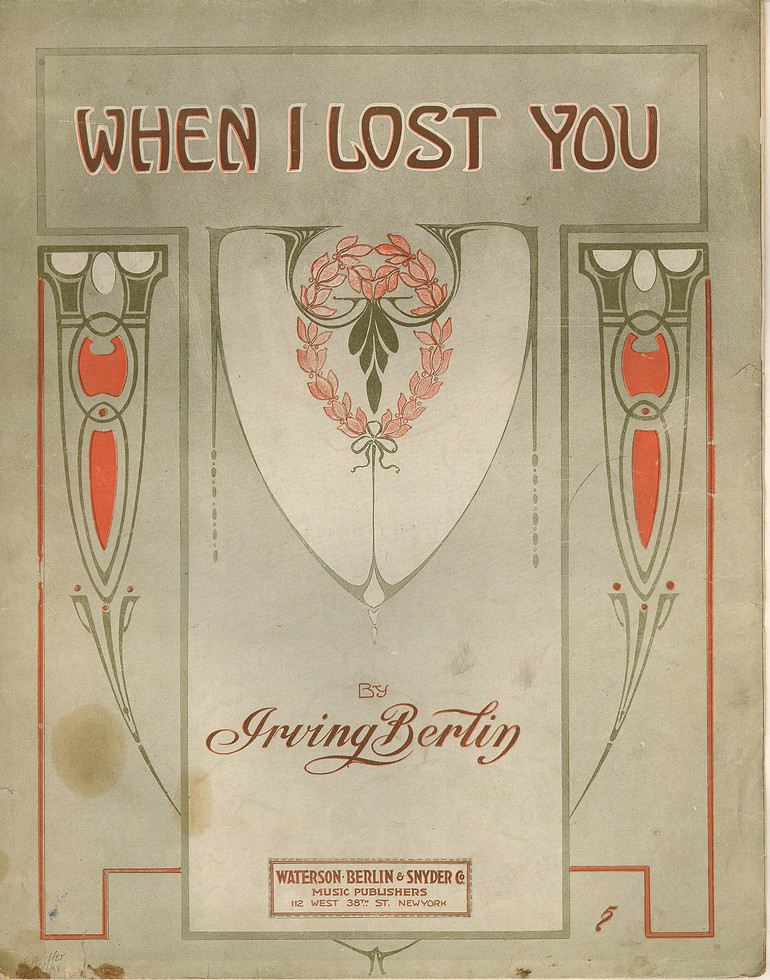
Sheet music for When I Lost You

This article is a list of songs written by Irving Berlin. It is arranged in alphabetical order, but can be rearranged in chronological order by clicking at the top of that column; songs with recordings may be sorted by the "click to play" column; songs with standalone Wikipedia articles about them can also be sorted.

Sources vary as to the number of songs actually written by Berlin, but a 2001 article in TIME put the figure at around 1,250. Of these, 25 tunes reached #1 on the pop charts. This is not a complete list, given that he wrote hundreds more songs than the ones listed here.

This list gives the year each song was written, or alternatively groups each song into a five-year period. The list is incomplete but gives a sense of Berlin's evolution as a songwriter over a period of decades.

According to the New York Public Library, whose Irving Berlin collection comprises 555 non-commercial recordings radio broadcasts, live performances, and private recordings, he published his first song, "Marie from Sunny Italy", in 1907 and had his first major international hit, "Alexander's Ragtime Band", in 1911.

Many of Berlin's songs were included in the seventeen complete scores he wrote for Broadway musicals and revues, including The Cocoanuts, As Thousands Cheer, Louisiana Purchase, Miss Liberty, Mr. President, Call Me Madam and Annie Get Your Gun.

== List ==
Song title	Year Written	Click to play
Abie Sings an Irish Song	1912–1916	
Abraham	1942–1946	
Across the Breakfast Table	1930	
Adoption Dance	1942–1946	
Aesop, that Able Fable Man	1952–1956	
After the Honeymoon	1907–1911	
After You Get What You Want, You Don't Want It	1920	
Alexander and His Clarinet	1907–1911	
Alexander's Bag-Pipe Band	1912–1916	
Alexander's Ragtime Band	1911	
Alice in Wonderland	1922–1926	
All Alone	1924	
All by Myself	1921	
All of My Life	1942–1946	
Along Came Ruth	1912–1916	
Always	1925	
Always April	1922–1926	
Always Treat Her Like a Baby	1912–1916	
American Eagles	1942–1946	
An Old Fashioned Tune Is Always New	1937–1941	
An Orange Grove in California	1922–1926	
And Father Wanted Me to Learn a Trade	1912–1916	
Angelo	1907–1911	
Angels	1907–1911	
Angels of Mercy	1937–1941	
Anna Liza's Wedding Day	1912–1916	
Antonio, You'd Better Come Home	1912–1916	
Any Bonds Today?	1941	
Any Love Today?	1927–1931	
Anybody Can Write	1952–1956	
Anything You Can Do (I Can Do Better)	1942–1946	
The Apple Tree and the Bumble Bee	1912–1916	
Araby	1912–1916	
Arms for the Love of America	1937–1941	
The Army's Made a Man of Me	1942–1946	
At Peace with the World	1922–1926	
At the Court Around the Comer	1917–1921	
At the Devil's Ball	1912–1916	
At the Picture Show	1912–1916	
Back to Back	1937–1941	
Bandanna Ball	1922–1926	
Be Careful, It's My Heart	1942–1946	
Beautiful Faces Need Beautiful Clothes	1917–1921	
Because I Love You	1926	
Becky's Got a Job in a Musical Show	1912–1916	
Before I Go and Marry I Will Have a Talk with You	1909	
Begging for Love	1927–1931	
Behind the Fan	1917–1921	
The Belle of the Barber's Ball	1912–1916	
The Bellhops	1922–1926	
Bells	1917–1921	
The Best of Friends Must Part	1908	
The Best Thing for You (Would Be Me)	1947–1951	
The Best Things Happen While You're Dancing	1952–1956	
Better Luck Next Time	1947–1951	
Better Times with Al	1927–1931	
Bevo	1917–1921	
Blow Your Horn	1912–1916	
The Blue Devils of France	1917–1921	
Blue Skies	1926	
Brand New	1912–1916	
Bring Back My Lena to Me	1907–1911	
Bring Back My Lovin' Man	1907–1911	
Bring Me a Ring in the Spring	1907–1911	
Bring on the Pepper	1922–1926	
Broker's Ensemble	1927–1931	
Business for a Good Girl Is Bad	1947–1951	
Business Is Business, Rosey Cohen	1907–1911	
But Where Are You?	1932–1936	
But! She's Just a Little Bit Crazy	1917–1921	
Butterfingers	1932–1936	
Call Again	1912–1916	
Call Me Up Some Rainy Afternoon	1907–1911	
The Call of the South	1922–1926	
Can You Use Any Money Today?	1947–1951	
Can't You Tell?	1922–1926	
Change Partners	1938	
Chanson Printaniere	1922–1926	
Chase All Your Cares and Go to Sleep, Baby	1927–1931	
Chatter, Chatter	1912–1916	
Cheek to Cheek	1932–1936	
The Chicken Walk	1912–1916	
Chinese Firecrackers	1917–1921	
Choreography	1952–1956	
Christmas Time Seems Years and Years Away	1907–1911	
Cinderella Lost Her Slipper	1917–1921	
The Circus Is Coming to Town	1917–1921	
City Hall	1932–1936	
Climbing the Scale	1922–1926	
Cohen Owes Me Ninety-Seven Dollars	1912–1916	
Colonel Buffalo Bill	1942–1946	
Colored Rome	1907–1911	
Come Along Sextette	1917–1921	
Come Along to Toy Town	1917–1921	
Come Back to Me, My Melody	1912–1916	
Come to the Land of the Argentine	1912–1916	
Coquette	1927–1931	
Count Your Blessings (Instead of Sheep)	1954	
A Couple of Song and Dance Men	1945	
A Couple of Swells	1947-1948	
Crinoline Days	1922–1926	
Cuddle Up	1907–1911	
Daddy, Come Home	1912–1916	
Dance and Grow Thin	1917–1921	
Dance with Me (Tonight at the Mardi Gras)	1937–1941	
Dance Your Troubles Away	1922–1926	
Dat Draggy Rag	1907–1911	
Dat's A My Gal	1907–1911	
De Tant Amour-De Tant D'Ivresse	1922–1926	
Dear Mayme, I Love You	1907–1911	
Debts	1932–1936	
The Devil Has Brought Up All the Coal	1917–1921	
Diamond Horse-Shoe	1922–1926	
Ding Dong	1917–1921	
Do It Again	1912–1916	
Do You Believe Your Eyes, or Do You Believe Your Baby?	1927–1931	
Do Your Duty, Doctor	1907–1911	
Dog Gone That Chilly Man	1907–1911	
Doin' What Comes Natur'lly	1942–1946	
Don't Be Afraid of Romance	1962–1966	
Don't Leave Your Wife Alone	1912–1916	
Don't Put Out the Light	1907–1911	
Don't Send Me Back to Petrograd	1922–1926	
Don't Take Your Beau to the Seashore	1907–1911	
Don't Wait too Long	1922–1926	
Dorando	1909	
Down in Chattanooga	1912–1916	
Down in My Heart	1912–1916	
Down to the Folies Bergere	1907–1911	
Down Where the Jack O'Lanterns Grow	1917–1921	
Dream on, Little Soldier Boy	1917–1921	
Dreams, Just Dreams	1907–1911	
Drinking Song	1932–1936	
Drowsy Head	1917–1921	
Drum Crazy	1947–1951	
Easter Parade	1933	
Eighteenth Amendment Repealed	1932–1936	
Elevator Man, Going Up! Going Up! Going Up!	1912–1916	
Empty Pockets Filled with Love	1962–1966	
England Every Time for Me	1912–1916	
Ephraham Played Upon the Piano	1907–1911	
Ever Since I Put on a Uniform	1917–1921	
Everybody Knew But Me	1942–1946	
Everybody Step	1921	
Everybody's Doin' It Now	1907–1911	
Everyone in the World Is Doing the Charleston	1922–1926	
Everything in America Is Ragtime	1912–1916	
Everything Is Rosy Now for Rosie	1917–1921	
Extra! Extra!	1947–1951	
The Eyes of Youth See the Truth	1917–1921	
Falling Out of Love Can Be Fun	1947–1951	
Father's Beard	1912–1916	
A Fella with an Umbrella	1947-1948	
The Fifth Army's Where My Heart Is	1942–1946	
The First Lady	1962–1966	
Five O'Clock Tea	1922–1926	
Florida By the Sea	1922–1926	
Follow Me Around	1912–1916	
Follow the Crowd	1912–1916	
Follow the Fleet	1932–1936	
Follow the Leader Jig	1947–1951	
Following the Girl Behind the Smile	1912–1916	
Fools Fall in Love	1937–1941	
For the Very First Time	1952–1956	
For Your Country and My Country	1917	
Free	1947–1951	
The Freedom Train	1947–1951	
The Friars Parade	1912–1916	
From Here to Shanghai	1917–1921	
The Funnies	1932–1936	
Funny Feet	1922–1926	
The Funny Little Melody	1912–1916	
Furnishing a Home for Two	1912–1916	
The Garden of Yesterday	1912–1916	
Gee, I Wish I Was Back in the Army	1952–1956	
Gentlemen Prefer Blondes	1922–1926	
Get Thee Behind Me Satan	1932–1936	
Getting Nowhere (Running Around In Circles)	1945	
Ginger	1912–1916	
The Girl on the Magazine Cover	1912–1916	
Girl on the Police Gazette	1937–1941	
The Girl That I Marry	1942–1946	
The Girls of My Dreams	1917–1921	
Give Me Your Tired, Your Poor (Emma Lazarus)	1947–1951	
Glad to be Home	1962–1966	
God Bless America	1937–1941	
God Gave You to Me	1912–1916	
Goodbye, France	1917–1921	
Goodbye, Girlie, And Remember Me	1907–1911	
Goody, Goody, Goody, Goody, Good	1912–1916	
The Grizzly Bear	1907–1911	
A Guy on Monday	1962–1966	
The Hand That Rocked My Cradle Rules My Heart	1917–1921	
Happy Easter	1947–1951	
Happy Holiday	1942–1946	
Happy Little Country Girl	1912–1916	
The Happy New Year Blues	1922–1926	
Harem Life	1917–1921	
Harlem On My Mind	1932–1936	
The Haunted House	1912–1916	
He Ain't Got Rhythm	1937–1941	
He Doesn't Know What It's All About	1922–1926	
He Played It on his Fid, Fid, Fiddle-De-Dee	1912–1916	
He Promised Me	1907–1911	
Heat Wave	1933	
Heaven Watch the Philippines	1942–1946	
Help Me to Help My Neighbor	1947–1951	
Herman, Let's Dance That Beautiful Waltz	1907–1911	
He's a Devil in His Own Home Town	1912–1916	
He's a Rag Picker	1912–1916	
He's Getting Too Darn Big for a One-Horse Town	1912–1916	
He's So Good to Me	1912–1916	
Hiram's Band	1912–1916	
Holiday Inn	1942–1946	
Home Again Blues	1917–1921	
Homesick	1922–1926	
Homeward Bound	1912–1916	
Homework	1947–1951	
The Honorable Profession of the Fourth Estate	1947–1951	
The Hostess with the Mostes'	1947–1951	
How About a Cheer for the Navy	1942–1946	
How About Me?	1927–1931	
How Can I Change My Luck?	1927–1931	
How Can I Forget	1917–1921	
How Deep Is the Ocean?	1932–1936	
How Do You Do It, Mabel, On Twenty Dollars a Week?	1907–1911	
How Many Times?	1922–1926	
How Much I Love You	1927–1931	
How's Chances?	1932–1936	
Hurry Back to My Bamboo Shack	1912–1916	
I Beg Your Pardon, Dear Old Broadway	1907–1911	
I Can Always Find a Little Sunshine in the Y.M.C.A.	1917–1921	
I Can't Do Without You	1927–1931	
I Can't Remember	1932–1936	
I Can't Tell a Lie	1942–1946	
I Didn't Go Home at All	1907–1911	
I Don't Want to Be Married	1927–1931	
I Get Along with the Aussies	1942–1946	
I Got Lost in His Arms	1942–1946	
I Got the Sun in the Mornin' (and the Moon at Night)	1942–1946	
I Hate You	1912–1916	
I Have Just One Heart for Just One Boy	1917–1921	
I Just Came Back to Say Goodbye	1909	
I Keep Running Away from You	1957–1961	
I Left My Door Open and My Daddy Walked Out	1917–1921	
I Left My Heart at the Stage Door Canteen	1942–1946	
I Like Ike	1952–1956	
I Like It	1917–1921	
I Lost My Heart In Dixieland	1919	
I Love a Piano	1915	
I Love My Neighbor	1927–1931	
I Love to Dance	1912–1916	
I Love to Have the Boys Around Me	1912–1916	
I Love to Quarrel with You	1912–1916	
I Love to Stay at Home	1912–1916	
(Just One Way to Say) I Love You	1947–1951	
I Love You More Each Day	1907–1911	
I Never Had A Chance	1932–1936	
I Never Knew	1917–1921	
I Never Want to See You Again	1952–1956	
I Never Would Do in Society	1912–1916	
I Paid My Income Tax Today	1942–1946	
I Poured My Heart into a Song	1937–1941	
I Say It's Spinach (And The Hell With It)	1932–1936	
I Still Like Ike	1952–1956	
I Threw a Kiss in the Ocean	1942–1946	
I Used to Be Color Blind	1938	
I Used to Play by Ear	1962–1966	
I Want to Be a Ballet Dancer	1922–1926	
I Want to Be in Dixie	1912–1916	
I Want to Go Back to Michigan	1914	
I Want You for Myself	1927–1931	
I Was Aviating Around	1912–1916	
I Wish You Was My Gal, Molly	1907–1911	
I Wonder	1917–1921	
I Wouldn't Give That for the Man Who Couldn't Dance	1917–1921	
I'd Like My Picture Took	1947–1951	
I'd Love to Be Shot from a Cannon with You	1937–1941	
I'd Rather Lead A Band	1932–1936	
I'd Rather See a Minstrel Show	1917–1921	
If All the Girls I Knew Were Like You	1912–1916	
If I Had My Way, I'd Live among the Gypsies	1917–1921	
If I Had You	1912–1916	
If I Thought You Wouldn't Tell	1907–1911	
If That's Your Idea of a Wonderful Time (Take Me Home)	1912–1916	
If the Managers Only Thought the Same As Mother	1907–1911	
If You Believe	1937–1941	
If You Don't Want Me (Why Do You Hang Around)	1912–1916	
If You Don't Want My Peaches (You'd Better Stop Shaking My Tree)	1912–1916	
Ike for Four More Years	1952–1956	
I'll Capture Your Heart Singing	1942–1946	
I'll Dance Rings around You	1942–1946	
I'll Know Better the Next Time	1957–1961	
I'll Miss You in the Evening	1932–1936	
I'll see you in C-U-B-A	1920	
I'll Share It All with You	1942–1946	
I'll Take You Back to Italy (written for the musical Jack O'Lantern)	1917–1921	
I'm a Bad, Bad Man	1942–1946	
I'm a Dancing Teacher Now	1912–1916	
I'm a Dumbbell	1917–1921	
I'm a Happy Married Man	1907–1911	
I'm a Vamp from East Broadway,	1917–1921	
I'm Afraid, Pretty Maid, I'm Afraid	1912–1916	
I'm an Indian, Too	1942–1946	
I'm Beginning to Miss You	1947–1951	
I'm Down in Honolulu Looking Them Over	1912–1916	
I'm Getting Tired So I Can Sleep	1942–1946	
I'm Going Back to Dixie	1912–1916	
I'm Going Back to the Farm	1912–1916	
I'm Going on a Long Vacation	1907–1911	
I'm Gonna Do It If I Like It	1917–1921	
I'm Gonna Get Him	1962–1966	
I'm Gonna Pin My Medal on the Girl I Left Behind	1917	
I'm Looking for a Daddy Long Legs	1922–1926	
I'm Not Afraid	1952–1956	
I'm Not Prepared	1912–1916	
I'm on My Way Home	1922–1926	
I'm Playing with Fire	1932–1936	
I'm Putting All My Eggs in One Basket	1932–1936	
I'm Sorry for Myself	1937–1941	
I'm the Guy Who Guards the Harem	1917–1921	
I'm the Head Man	1927–1931	
In a Cozy Kitchenette Apartment	1917–1921	
In Acapulco	1947–1951	
In Florida Among the Palms	1912–1916	
In My Harem	1912–1916	
In Our Hide-Away	1962–1966	
In the Morning	1927–1931	
In the Shade of a Sheltering Tree	1922–1926	
In Those Good Old Bowery Days	1927–1931	
Innocent Bessie Brown	1907–1911	
Irving Berlin Barrett	1957–1961	
Is He the Only Man in the World?	1962–1966	
Is That Nice	1927–1931	
Is There Anything Else that I Can Do For You?	1907–1911	
Isn't This a Lovely Day?	1932–1936	
Israel	1957–1961	
It All Belongs to Me	1927–1931	
It Gets Lonely in the White House	1962–1966	
It Isn't What He Said, But the Way He Said It	1912–1916	
It Only Happens When I Dance with You	1947–1951	
It Takes an Irishman to Make Love	1917–1921	
It Takes More than Love to Keep a Lady Warm	1952–1956	
It'll Come to You	1937–1941	
It's a Lovely Day Today	1950	
It's a Lovely Day Tomorrow	1937–1941	
It's a Walk-in with Walker	1922–1926	
It's Always the Same	1962–1966	
It's the Little Bit of Irish	1917–1921	
It's Up to the Band	1927–1931	
It's Yours	1927–1931	
I've Got a Sweet Tooth Bothering Me	1912–1916	
I've Got My Captain Working for Me Now	1920	
I've Got My Love to Keep Me Warm	1937	
I've Got to Be Around	1962–1966	
I've Got to Go Back to Texas	1912–1916	
I've Got to Have Some Lovin' Now	1912–1916	
Jake! Jake! The Yiddisher Ball Player	1912–1916	
Jap-German Sextette	1942–1946	
Jimmy	1927–1931	
Jungle Jingle	1927–1931	
Just a Blue Serge Suit	1942–1946	
Just a Little Longer	1922–1926	
Just A Little While	1927–1931	
Just Another Kill	1917–1921	
Just Like the Rose	1909	
Kate	1947–1951	
Keep Away From the Fellow Who Owns an Automobile	1912–1916	
Keep on Walking	1912–1916	
The Kick in the Pants	1942–1946	
The Ki-I-Youdling Dog	1912–1916	
King of Broadway	1917–1921	
Kiss Me, My Honey, Kiss Me	1907–1911	
Kiss Your Sailor Boy Goodbye	1912–1916	
Kitchen Police	1917–1921	
Klondike Kate	1952–1956	
Knights of the Road	1927–1931	
Ladies of the Chorus	1942–1946	
Lady of the Evening	1922–1926	
Latins Know How	1937–1941	
Laugh It Up	1962–1966	
The Law Must Be Obeyed	1912–1916	
Lazy	1922–1926	
Lead Me to Love	1912–1916	
Lead Me to that Beautiful Band	1912–1916	
Learn to Do the Strut	1922–1926	
Learn to Sing a Love Song	1927–1931	
The Leg of Nations	1917–1921	
The Legend of the Pearls	1917–1921	
Let Me Sing and I'm Happy	1927–1931	
Let Yourself Go	1932–1936	
Let's All Be Americans Now	1917	
Let's Face the Music and Dance	1932–1936	
Let's Go Around the Town	1912–1916	
Let's Go Back to the Waltz	1962–1966	
Let's Go West Again	1942–1946	
Let's Have Another Cup of Coffee	1932–1936	
Let's Say It with Firecrackers	1942–1946	
Let's Start the New Year Right	1942–1946	
Let's Take an Old Fashioned Walk	1947–1951	
Letter Boxes	1917–1921	
Lichtenburg	1947–1951	
Lindy	1917–1921	
Listening	1922–1926	
A Little Bit of Everything	1912–1916	
A Little Bungalow	1922–1926	
Little Butterfly	1922–1926	
Little Fish in a Big Pond	1947–1951	
The Little Girl Who Couldn't Care	1912–1916	
A Little Old Church in England	1937–1941	
The Little Red Lacquer Cage	1922–1926	
The Little Things In Life	1930	
Lock Me in Your Harem and Throw Away the Key	1912–1916	
Lonely Heart	1932–1936	
Lonely Moon	1912–1916	
Long As I Can Take You Home	1962–1966	
Look at Them Doing It	1912–1916	
Look Out for That Bolsheviki Man	1917–1921	
The Lord Done Fixed up My Soul	1937–1941	
Louisiana Purchase	1937–1941	
Love And The Weather	1947–1951	
Love Leads to Marriage	1952–1956	
Love, You Didn't Do Right by Me	1952–1956	
Lucky Boy	1922–1926	
Lunching at the Automat	1932–1936	
Maid of Mesh	1922–1926	
Majestic Sails at Midnight	1932–1936	
Man Bites Dog	1932–1936	
A Man Chases a Girl	1947–1951	
A Man Is Only a Man	1917–1921	
A Man to Cook For	1962–1966	
Mandy	1919	
Manhattan Madness	1932–1936	
Marching Along with Time	1938	
Marie (AKA "Marie (The Dawn Is Breaking)")	1929	
Marie from Sunny Italy	1907	
Marrying for Love	1947–1951	
Mary Brown	1917–1921	
Maybe I Love You Too Much	1932–1936	
Maybe It's Because I Love You	1933	
Me	1927–1931	
Me An' My Bundle	1947–1951	
Me and My Melinda	1942–1946	
Meat and Potatoes	1962–1966	
Meet Me Tonight	1907–1911	
Memory That's Soon Forgotten	1927–1931	
Metropolitan Nights	1912–1916	
Metropolitan Opening	1932–1936	
The Million Dollar Ball	1912–1916	
Minstrel Days	1922–1926	
The Minstrel Parade	1912–1916	
Miss Liberty	1947–1951	
Molly, Oh! Molly	1907–1911	
The Monkey Doodle Doo (from All Aboard)	1912–1916	
Montmartre	1922–1926	
Moon Over Napoli	1932–1936	
Moonlight Maneuvers	1932–1936	
Moonshine Lullaby	1942–1946	
Morning Exercises	1912–1916	
The Most	1952–1956	
The Most Expensive Statue in the World	1947–1951	
Move Over	1912–1916	
Mr. Jazz Himself	1917–1921	
Mr. Monotony	1947–1951	
Mr. President	1962–1966	
Mrs. Sally Adams	1947–1951	
My Baby's Come Back to Me	1922–1926	
My Ben Ali Haggin Girl	1917–1921	
My Bird of Paradise	1912–1916	
My British Buddy	1943	
My Castle	1927–1931	
My Defenses Are Down	1942–1946	
My Heather Belle	1912–1916	
My Little Book of Poetry	1917–1921	
My Little Feller	1927–1931	
My Melody Dream	1907–1911	
My New York	1927–1931	
My Rhinestone Girl	1927–1931	
My Sergeant and I Are Buddies	1942–1946	
My Sweet Italian Man	1912–1916	
My Sweetie	1917–1921	
My Tamborine Girl	1917–1921	
My Walking Stick	1937–1941	
My Wife's Gone to the Country (Hurrah! Hurrah!)	1907–1911	
How Dry I Am	1919	
The New Moon	1919	
Next To Your Mother Who Do You Love?	1907–1911	
The Night Is Filled with Music	1937–1941	
No One Could Do It Like My Father	1907–1911	
No Strings (I'm Fancy Free)	1932–1936	
Nobody Knows (And Nobody Seems to Care)	1917–1921	
Nora	1927–1931	
Not for All the Rice in China	1933	
Now It Can Be Told	1937–1941	
Nudist Colony	1932–1936	
The Ocarina	1947–1951	
Office Hours	1912–1916	
Oh! How I Hate to Get Up in the Morning	1910	
Oh! To Be Home Again	1942–1946	
Oh! Where Is My Wife Tonight?	1907–1911	
Oh, How That German Could Love	1910	
Oh, That Beautiful Rag	1907–1911	
Old Fashioned Wedding	1966	
The Old Maid's Ball	1912–1916	
The Old Man	1952–1956	
On a Roof in Manhattan	1932–1936	
On the Steps of Grant's Tomb	1937–1941	
Once Every Four Years	1962–1966	
Once Upon a Time Today	1947–1951	
One Girl	1922–1926	
One O'Clock in the Morning I Get Lonesome	1907–1911	
A One-Man Woman	1962–1966	
Only for Americans	1947–1951	
Ooh, Maybe It's You	1927–1931	
Opening the Mizner Story	1952–1956	
Opera Burlesque on the Sextette	1912–1916	
Our Day of Independence	1947–1951	
Our Wedding Day	1932–1936	
Out of the This World, Into My Arms	1952–1956	
Outside of Loving You, I Like You	1962–1966	
Outside of That I Love You	1937–1941	
Over the Sea, Boys	1917–1921	
The P.X.	1962–1966	
Pack up Your Sins and Go to the Devil"	1922–1926	
Paris Wakes up and Smiles	1947–1951	
The Passion Flower	1917–1921	
Piano Man	1907–1911	
The Piccolino	1932–1936	
Pick, Pick, Pick on the Mandolin, Antonio	1912–1916	
Pickaninny — Mose	1917–1921	
Pigtails and Freckles	1962–1966	
Play a Simple Melody (aka "Simple Melody/Musical Demon")	1914	
A Play without a Bedroom	1917–1921	
Please Let Me Come Back to You	1952–1956	
Plenty to Be Thankful For	1942–1946	
The Police of New York	1927–1931	
The Policemen's Ball	1947–1951	
Polka	1912–1916	
Polly, Pretty Polly	1917–1921	
Poor Joe	1962–1966	
Poor Little Rich Girl's Dog	1917–1921	
Porcelain Maid	1922–1926	
The President's Birthday Ball	1942–1946	
Pretty Birdie	1917–1921	
A Pretty Girl Is Like a Melody	1919	
The Pulitzer Prize	1947–1951	
Pullman Porters Parade	1912–1916	
Puttin' on the Ritz	1930	
Queenie, My Own	1908	
The Race Horse and the Flea	1942–1946	
Ragtime Finale	1912–1916	
The Ragtime Jockey Man	1912–1916	
Ragtime Mocking Bird	1912–1916	
Ragtime Opera Melody	1912–1916	
Ragtime Razor Brigade	1917–1921	
Ragtime Soldier Man	1912–1916	
The Ragtime Violin	1907–1911	
Rainbow of Girls	1927–1931	
Rainy Day Sue	1922–1926	
Reaching for the Moon	1930	
Real Girl	1907–1911	
Relatives	1917–1921	
Remember	1925	
Revolt in Cuba	1932–1936	
Ribbons and Bows	1927–1931	
The Road that Leads to Love	1917–1921	
Rock-A-Bye Baby	1922–1926	
Roses of Yesterday	1927–1931	
Rum Tum Tiddle	1912–1916	
Run Home and Tell Your Mother	1907–1911	
Russian Lullaby	1927	
Sadie Salome (Go Home)	1907–1911	
Sailor Song	1912–1916	
A Sailor's Not a Sailor	before 1954	
Sam, Sam, the Man What Am	1957–1961	
San Francisco Bound	1912–1916	
Say It Isn't So	1932–1936	
Say It with Music	1917–1921	
Sayonara	1957–1961	
The Schoolhouse Blues	1917–1921	
The Secret Service	1962–1966	
Send a Lot of Jazz Bands Over There	1917–1921	
A Serenade to an Old-Fashioned Girl	1942–1946	
Settle Down in a One-Horse Town	1912–1916	
Sex Marches On	1937–1941	
Shakin' the Blues Away	1927–1931	
She Was a Dear Little Girl	1907–1911	
Show Me the Way	1917–1921	
Show Us How to Do the Fox Trot	1912–1916	
Silver Platter	1957–1961	
Sing a Song of Sing Sing	1947–1951	
Si's Been Drinking Cider	1912–1916	
Sisters	1953	
Sittin’ In The Sun (Countin’ My Money)	1952–1956	
Sixteen, Sweet Sixteen	1922–1926	
Skate with Me	1932–1936	
Skating Song	1912–1916	
Slumming on Park Avenue	1937–1941	
Smile and Show Your Dimple	1917–1921	
Smiling Geisha	1952–1956	
Snookey Ookums	1912–1916	
Snow	1952–1956	
So Help Me	1932–1936	
Society Wedding	1932–1936	
Soft Lights and Sweet Music	1927–1931	
Sombrero Land	1907–1911	
Some Little Something About You	1907–1911	
Some Sunny Day	1922–1926	
Somebody's Coming to My House	1912–1916	
Someone Else May Be There	1917–1921	
Someone Just Like You, Dear	1907–1911	
Someone's Waiting for Me	1907–1911	
Something to Dance About	1947–1951	
Song for Belly Dancer	1962–1966	
Song for Elizabeth Esther Barrett	1957–1961	
The Song Is Ended (but the Melody Lingers On)	1927–1931	
Song of Freedom	1942–1946	
The Song of the Metronome	1937–1941	
Spanish Love	1907–1911	
Spring and Fall	1912–1916	
Stay Down Here Where You Belong	1912–1916	
Steppin' Out with My Baby	1947–1951	
The Sterling Silver Moon	1917–1921	
Stop Press	1932–1936	
Stop That Rag (Keep on Playing)	1907–1911	
Stop! Look! Listen!	1912–1916	
Stop! Stop! Stop! Come Over and Love Me Some More	1907–1911	
A Streak of Blues	1917–1921	
The Sun Dollars	1912–1916	
Sunshine	1927–1931	
Supper Time	1932–1936	
Swanee Shuffle	1927–1931	
Sweet Baby	1927–1931	
Sweet Italian Love	1907–1911	
Sweet Marie, Make a Rag-a-Time-a-Dance with Me	1907–1911	
Sweeter Than Sugar (Is My Sweetie)	1917–1921	
Swing Sister	1937–1941	
Syncopated Cocktail	1917–1921	
The Syncopated Vamp	1917–1921	
The Syncopated Walk	1912–1916	
Take a Little Tip from Father	1912–1916	
Take a Little Wife	1922–1926	
Take 'im Away, He's Breaking My Heart	1922–1926	
Take It in Your Stride	1942–1946	
Take Me Back	1912–1916	
Take Off A Little Bit	1912–1916	
Tango Melody	1922–1926	
Teach Me How to Love	1912–1916	
Tell All the Folks in Kentucky (I'm Coming Home)	1922–1926	
Tell Her in the Springtime	1922–1926	
Tell Me a Bedtime Story	1922–1926	
Tell Me with a Melody	1922–1926	
Tell Me, Little Gypsy	1917–1921	
Telling Lies	1907–1911	
The Ten Best Undressed Women in the World	1962–1966	
Thank You, Kind Sir, Said She	1907–1911	
That Dying Rag	1907–1911	
That Goody Melody	1917–1921	
That Hula Hula	1912–1916	
That International Rag	1913	
That Kazzatsky Dance	1907–1911	
That Mesmerizing Mendelssohn Tune	1909	
That Monkey Tune	1907–1911	
That Mysterious Rag (written with Ted Snyder)	1911	
That Opera Rag	1907–1911	
That Russian Winter	1942–1946	
That Society Bear	1912–1916	
That's a Good Girl	1922–1926	
That's How I Love You	1912–1916	
That's My Idea of Paradise	1912–1916	
That's My Idea of Paradise	1917–1921	
That's What the Well-Dressed Man in Harlem Will Wear	1942–1946	
There Are No Wings on a Foxhole	1942–1946	
There are Two Eyes in Dixie	1917–1921	
There's a Corner Up in Heaven	1917–1921	
There's a Girl in Arizona	1912–1916	
There's a Girl in Havana	1907–1911	
There's No Business Like Show Business	1946	
There's Something Nice about the South	1917–1921	
They Always Follow Me Around	1912–1916	
They Call It Dancing	1917–1941	
They Like Ike	1947–1951	
They Love Me	1962	
They Say It's Wonderful	1942–1946	
They Were All Out of Step But Jim	1917	
They're Blaming the Charleston	1922–1926	
They're on Their Way to Mexico	1912–1916	
They've Got Me Doin' It Now	1912–1916	
This Is a Great Country	1962–1966	
This Is the Army, Mister Jones	1942	
This Is the Life	1912–1916	
This Time	1942–1946	
This Year’s Kisses	1937–1941	
Tickling the Ivories	1927–1931	
Ting-a-Ling, the Bells'll Ring	1922–1926	
To Be Forgotten	1927–1931	
To Be Or Not To Be	1932–1936	
To My Mammy	1927–1931	
Toast to Prohibition	1927–1931	
Together We Two	1927–1931	
Tokio Blues	1922–1926	
Too Many Sweethearts	1922–1926	
Top Hat, White Tie and Tails	1932–1936	
Torch Song	1927–1931	
The Train	1947–1951	
Tra-La, La, La!	1912–1916	
A True Born Soldier Man	1912–1916	
Try It On Your Piano	1907–1911	
Two Cheers Instead of Three	1927–1931	
Unlucky in Love	1922–1926	
Until I Fell in Love with You	1915	
Ve Don't Like It	1942–1946	
Venetian Isles	1922–1926	
Virginia Lou	1907–1911	
The Voice of Belgium	1912–1916	
Wait Until Your Daddy Comes Home	1912–1916	
Wait Until You're Married	1962–1966	
Waiting At The End Of The Road	1929	
The Waltz of Long Ago	1922–1926	
Was There Ever a Pal Like You?	1917–1921	
Washington Square Dance	1947–1951	
The Washington Twist	1962–1966	
Wasn't It Yesterday?	1917–1921	
Watch Your Step	1912–1916	
We Have Much to Be Thankful For	1912–1916	
We Saw the Sea	1932–1936	
We Should Care	1922–1926	
The Wedding of Words and Music	1917–1921	
Welcome Home	1912–1916	
We'll All Be in Heaven When the Dollar Goes to Hell	1932–1936	
We'll All Go Voting for Al	1922–1926	
We'll Never Know	1922–1926	
We'll Wait, Wait, Wait, Wait	1907–1911	
We're on Our Way to France	1917–1921	
What a Lucky Break for Me	1927–1931	
What Am I Gonna Do?	1907–1911	
What Are We Gonna Do with All the Jeeps?	1942–1946	
What Can You Do with a General?	1947–1951	
What Chance Have I With Love?	1952–1956	
What Do I Have to Do to Get My Picture in the Paper?	1947–1951	
What Does He Look Like?	1942–1946	
What Does It Matter?	1927–1931	
What Is Love?	1912–1916	
What Makes Me Love You?	1927–1931	
What'll I Do?	1924	
What's There about Me?	1922–1926	
When a One-Star General's Daughter Meets a Four-Star General's Son	1952–1956	
When I Discovered You	1912–1916	
When I Get Back to the U.S.A.	1912–1916	
When I Hear You Play That Piano, Bill	1907–1911	
When I Lost You	1912	
When I'm Alone I'm Lonesome	1907–1911	
When I'm Out with You	1912–1916	
When I'm Thinking of You, I'm Thinking of a Wonderful Love	1912–1916	
When It Rains, Sweetheart, When It Rains	1912–1916	
When It's Night Time in Dixie Land	1912–1916	
When It's Peach Blossom Time in Lichtenburg	1952–1956	
When Johnson's Quartet Harmonize	1912–1916	
When Love Was All	1957–1961	
When My Baby Smiles	1917–1921	
When My Dreams Come True	1927–1931	
When That Man Is Dead and Gone	1937–1941	
When the Black Sheep Returns to the Fold	1912–1916	
When the Curtain Falls	1917–1921	
When the Folks High-Up Do the Mean Low Down	1927–1931	
When the Midnight Choo Choo Leaves for Alabam	1912	
When This Crazy World Is Sane Again	1937–1941	
When We're Running a Little Hotel of Our Own	1922–1926	
When Winter Comes	1937–1941	
When You Kiss an Italian Girl	1907–1911	
When You Walked Out, Someone Else Walked Right In	1922–1926	
When You're Down in Louisville (Call on Me)	1912–1916	
When You're in Town (In My Home Town)	1907–1911	
Where Is My Little Old New York?	1922–1926	
Where Is the Song of Songs for Me?	1927–1931	
While the Band Played an American Rag	1912–1916	
Whisper It	1962–1966	
Whistling Rag	1907–1911	
White Christmas	1942	
Who	1922–1926	
Who Needs the Birds and the Bees?	1962–1966	
Whose Little Heart Are You Breaking Now?	1917–1921	
Why Do You Want to Know Why?	1922–1926	
Why Don't They Give Us a Chance?	1912–1916	
Why I Love My Baby	1927–1931	
Why Should He Fly at So Much a Week?	1927–1931	
Wild about You	1937–1941	
Wild Cherries Rag	1907–1911	
Will She Come from the East?	1922–1926	
Wishing	1907–1911	
With a Family Reputation	1922–1926	
With My Head in the Clouds	1942–1946	
With You	1927–1931	
Woodman, Woodman, Spare That Tree	1907–1911	
The Yam	1937–1941	
Yankee Love	1907–1911	
Yascha Michaeloffsky's Melody	1927–1931	
Yiddisha Eyes	1907–1911	
Yiddisha Nightingale	1907–1911	
The Yiddisha Professor	1912–1916	
Yiddle on Your Fiddle Play Some Ragtime	1909	
You Better Come Home	1912–1916	
You Can Have Him	1947–1951	
You Cannot Make Your Shimmy Shake on Tea	1917–1921	
You Can't Brush Me Off	1937–1941	
You Can't Get a Man with a Gun	1942–1946	
You Can't Lose the Blues with Colors	1957–1961	
You Forgot to Remember	1922–1926	
You Got to Have It in Hollywood	1927–1931	
You Keep Coming Back Like a Song	1943	
You Must Be Born with It	1927–1931	
You Need a Hobby	1962–1966	
You Picked a Bad Day to Say Goodbye	1912–1916	
You'd Be Surprised	1919	
You're a Sentimental Guy	1952–1956	
You're a Sucker for a Dame	1952–1956	
You're Easy to Dance With	1942–1946	
You're Just in Love	1947–1951	
You're Laughing at Me	1937–1941	
You're Lonely and I'm Lonely	1937–1941	
You're So Beautiful	1917–1921	
You've Built a Fire Down in My Heart	1907–1911	
You've Got Me Hypnotized	1907–1911	
You've Got Your Mother's Big Blue Eyes	1912–1916	
