= Arthur Moreira Lima =

Brazilian classical pianist (1940-2024)

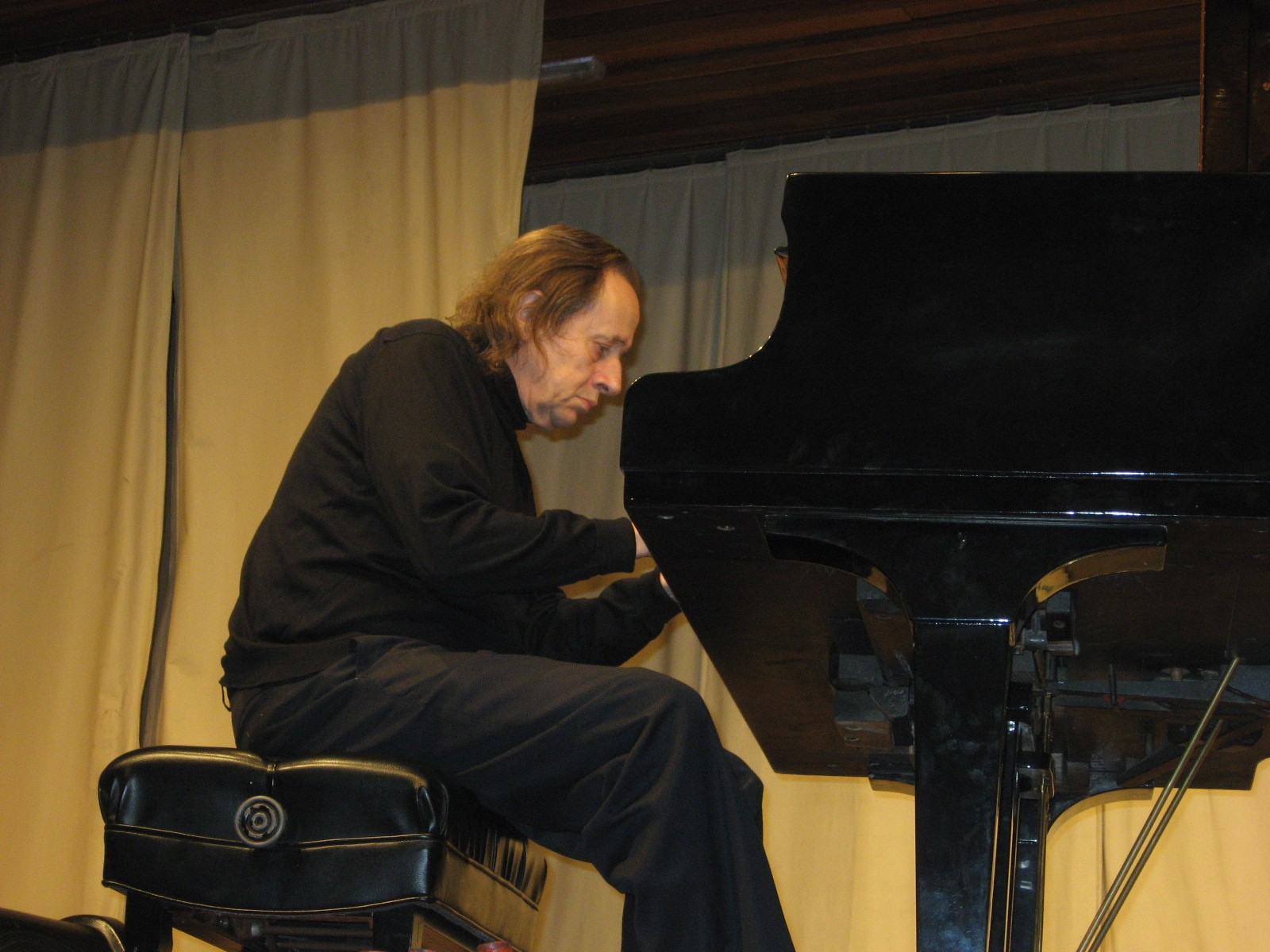
- Moreira Lima in concert in 2008

Background information
- Born: 16 July 1940; Rio de Janeiro, Brazil
- Died: 30 October 2024 (aged 84) Florianópolis, Santa Catarina, Brazil
- Genres: Classical; Choro
- Occupation: Concert pianist
- Instrument: Piano
- Years active: 1949–2024
- Awards: Second prize, VII International Chopin Piano Competition (1965); Commander, Order of Cultural Merit (2001); Doctor honoris causa, Federal University of Rio de Janeiro (2024)

Arthur Moreira Lima (16 July 1940 – 30 October 2024) was a Brazilian concert pianist and one of the country's leading pianists of his generation. Chopin stood at the center of his playing, but Brazilian music was just as present in his concerts and recordings, especially the work of Ernesto Nazareth.

Moreira Lima won second prize at the VII International Chopin Piano Competition in Warsaw in 1965, behind Martha Argerich. He later took third prize at the Leeds International Piano Competition in 1969 and shared third prize at the International Tchaikovsky Competition in Moscow in 1970. He performed across Europe, the Soviet Union and the Americas, and returned to Warsaw as a juror at the Chopin Competition in 2021.

His repertory extended from Bach, Mozart and Beethoven to Liszt, Schumann, Brahms, Rachmaninoff, Mussorgsky, Prokofiev and Villa-Lobos. He devoted much of his career to Brazilian music, recording Nazareth, Radamés Gnattali, Francisco Mignone, Brasílio Itiberê da Cunha and Waldemar Henrique. He also played with choro musicians, singers and songwriters, bringing music that was often kept in separate concert worlds onto the same stage.

From the 1990s, Moreira Lima increasingly played outside concert halls. Through Um Piano pela Estrada, he toured Brazil with a grand piano and a truck that opened into a stage, giving free concerts in public squares, outlying neighbourhoods and small towns. By 2018, the project had given more than 500 concerts and reached an estimated audience of about one million people.

== Biography ==
=== Early life and training ===
==== Childhood in Rio de Janeiro ====
Moreira Lima was born in Rio de Janeiro on 16 July 1940. His father died when he was three. He first attended the Liceu Francês and later studied at the Colégio Militar do Rio de Janeiro.

He began piano lessons at six and became a pupil of Lúcia Branco in 1948. The following year, at the age of nine, he gave his first professional recital at the Theatro da Paz in Belém.

Branco entered him in the 1949 Young Soloists competition of the Brazilian Symphony Orchestra. He won by unanimous decision after playing Mozart's Piano Concerto No. 23 under Eleazar de Carvalho. In 1952, he won again with Beethoven's Piano Concerto No. 1. That victory led to an appearance at the Theatro Municipal do Rio de Janeiro under the English conductor Richard Austin.

In 1956, Moreira Lima won a competition organized by Rádio Ministério da Educação. The prize was a scholarship to study in Paris, but he postponed the trip and stayed at the Colégio Militar. He reached the final of the first Rio de Janeiro International Piano Competition in 1957. Guiomar Novaes, who sat on the jury, awarded him an honorable mention. Marguerite Long invited him to study with her in France, and President Juscelino Kubitschek approved another scholarship for the trip. By seventeen, Moreira Lima had received two scholarships for study in Paris.

==== Paris and Moscow ====
Moreira Lima left for Paris in 1960 and began studying with Long. He played in events for the 150th anniversary of Chopin's birth and took part in that year's Ravel Festival. At the Académie Marguerite Long, he finished first among fifty students in the Cours de Piano Supérieur. He also received an honorable mention at the Marguerite Long-Jacques Thibaud Competition.

In 1962, he took third prize at the third Rio de Janeiro International Piano Competition. He was the only Brazilian in the final. The result brought an offer to study at the Juilliard School in New York. That year, he also entered the first Van Cliburn International Piano Competition in Texas. He did not reach the final, but Van Cliburn encouraged him to study at the Moscow Conservatory.

The Russian pianists Yakov Zak, Lev Oborin and Sergei Dorensky supported his application. Moreira Lima received a five-year scholarship from the Soviet government and entered the conservatory in 1963.

He studied with Rudolf Kehrer until 1968. Their lessons focused on phrasing, tone and making the piano sing. When Moreira Lima worried about having to learn Russian, Kehrer told him that far more people spoke Russian than played the piano well. In 1965, Kehrer chose him as one of seven students from the Moscow Conservatory to enter the VII International Chopin Piano Competition in Warsaw.

=== International career ===
In 1965, while studying at the Moscow Conservatory, Moreira Lima was chosen by Rudolf Kehrer to enter the VII International Chopin Piano Competition in Warsaw. He reached the final, played Chopin's Piano Concerto No. 2, and won second prize behind Martha Argerich. He kept Chopin in his concert programs for the rest of his career.

He returned to Moscow, finished his studies, and spent three years as Kehrer's teaching assistant. On a visit to Brazil in 1966, he gave a recital at the Theatro Municipal do Rio de Janeiro with music by Schumann, Chopin and Prokofiev. He closed the concert with Ernesto Nazareth's Batuque and Coração que sente.

Moreira Lima won third prize at the Leeds International Piano Competition in 1969, behind Radu Lupu and Georges Pludermacher. Boris Petrushansky and Anne Queffélec were among the other finalists. A year later, he shared third prize with Victoria Postnikova at the International Tchaikovsky Competition in Moscow. In the final, he played Tchaikovsky's Piano Concerto No. 1 and Rachmaninoff's Piano Concerto No. 3.

He moved to Vienna after the Tchaikovsky Competition and spent much of the 1970s touring from there. He played with the Leningrad, Moscow and Warsaw philharmonic orchestras, the Berlin, Vienna and Prague symphony orchestras, BBC orchestras in London, and the Orchestre National de France. He performed under Kurt Sanderling, Kirill Kondrashin, Mariss Jansons, Serge Baudo, Jesús López Cobos, Charles Groves, Vladimir Fedoseyev and Rudolf Barshai.

Chopin and other Romantic composers stayed in his programs, while Brazilian music took up more space in his concerts and albums. In 1975, he made a double album of music by Ernesto Nazareth for the Marcus Pereira label. He returned to Nazareth in later albums and recitals. He played music by Heitor Villa-Lobos, Brasílio Itiberê da Cunha, Radamés Gnattali, Francisco Mignone and Waldemar Henrique, as well as Chopin, Brahms, Mozart, Rachmaninoff, Schumann, Prokofiev and Mussorgsky.

Near the end of the 1970s, Moreira Lima made Brazil his main base again, though he still performed abroad. He worked more often with musicians from choro and Brazilian popular music, among them Época de Ouro, Elomar Figueira Mello, Paulo Moura and Heraldo do Monte. He made Chorando Baixinho with Época de Ouro and Abel Ferreira, Parcelada Malunga with Elomar, and ConSertão with Elomar, Moura and Heraldo do Monte.

In 1981, he gave an all-Chopin recital in New York. He returned the next year with a program that paired Chopin with Brazilian music. That year, he played Nazareth at the Library of Congress in Washington, D.C. In a 1984 review for The Washington Post, Joseph McLellan wrote that the concert introduced Nazareth to American audiences and called Moreira Lima's playing "fluent, technically assured and totally idiomatic".

In 2021, Moreira Lima returned to the Chopin Competition as a member of the jury, fifty-six years after winning second prize there.

=== Television and public outreach ===
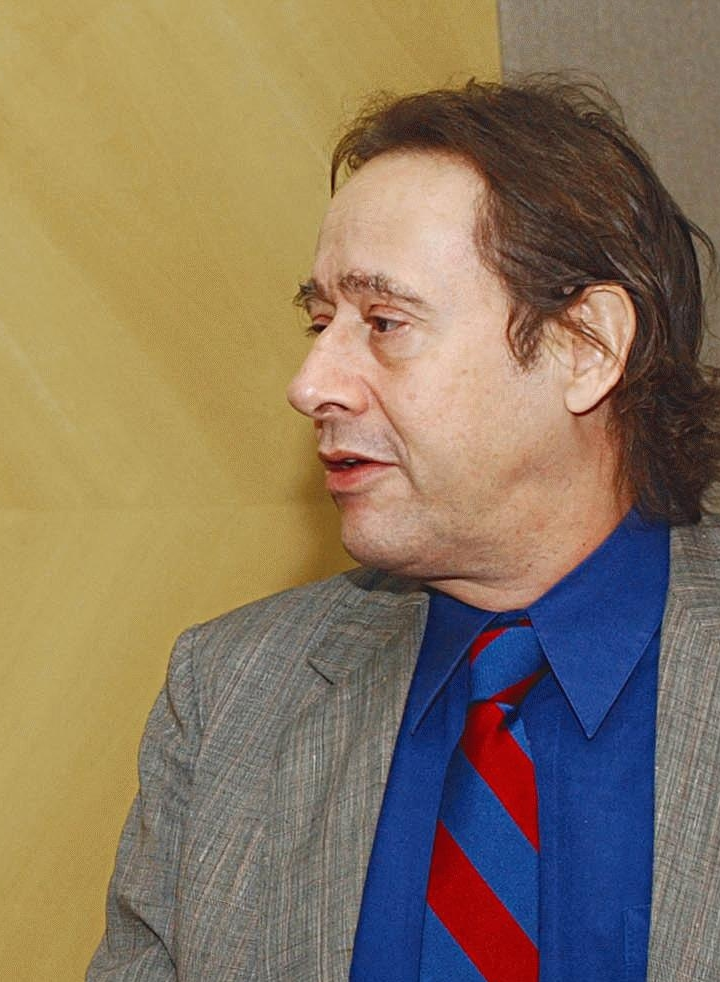
Moreira Lima in 2004

==== Television ====
Moreira Lima presented Um Toque de Classe on TV Manchete in 1985 and 1986. The show paired conversation with live music. A single episode could move from the concert repertory to choro, samba or Brazilian popular song. César Camargo Mariano took over as host after Moreira Lima's run ended.

Guests on the program included Radamés Gnattali, Antônio Carlos Jobim, Paulinho da Viola, Raphael Rabello, Milton Nascimento, Ney Matogrosso, Moreira da Silva, João Nogueira and Nelson Gonçalves. Moreira Lima spoke with them from the piano and often played alongside them.

==== Concerts beyond recital halls ====
In the 1990s, Moreira Lima began giving more concerts away from the usual recital circuit. He played in Mangueira, Rocinha and towns in the interior of Rio de Janeiro state. For some listeners, these performances were their first chance to hear a concert grand piano in person.

He also brought his recordings to newsstands. In 1998, Editora Caras released 41 CDs of his performances, accompanied by texts from Eric Nepomuceno. The set covered European composers and Brazilian music.

==== Um Piano pela Estrada ====
Moreira Lima developed the idea for Um Piano pela Estrada while working as Rio de Janeiro's undersecretary of culture for the interior. A concert in a new town required a piano, a stage, lighting and sound equipment. Setting everything up and taking it down could take days. He decided to carry the stage and piano from town to town.

He bought a Scania truck with his own money and had it rebuilt so that one side opened into a stage. The truck used air suspension to reduce the shocks carried to the piano while travelling. It was completed in September 2001 and began making appearances in 2002. The first full tour came in 2003 under the title São Francisco: Um Rio de Música, with concerts in twelve towns along the São Francisco River.

In 2005 and 2006, the tour Nos Caminhos da Fronteira reached 35 towns near Brazil's land borders, from Chuí in Rio Grande do Sul to Xapuri in Acre. The 2007 tour, Nos Caminhos de JK, stopped in 57 cities across Maranhão, Minas Gerais, Goiás, Tocantins and Pará, with further concerts in the Federal District and Rio de Janeiro.

By 2007, the project travelled in two trucks. They carried a 2.11 m (6.9 ft) Steinway grand piano, a second Steinway kept in reserve and a smaller piano for Moreira Lima to use between concerts. The main truck opened into a stage measuring about 45 m^{2} (480 sq ft). It also carried sound and lighting equipment, a projection screen and a dressing room.

The crew could prepare the truck for a concert in about an hour. Before a performance in Santos in 2012, twelve workers opened the stage, installed the sound, lights and screen, and tuned the piano. They packed everything away in about the same time before leaving for the next stop. By 2018, seventeen people travelled with the project, including a piano tuner and a sound engineer.

The concerts were free and usually lasted about ninety minutes. Moreira Lima moved from Bach, Beethoven, Chopin, Mozart and Villa-Lobos to Pixinguinha, Ernesto Nazareth, Luiz Gonzaga and Astor Piazzolla. Local musicians sometimes opened the evening. In Aracaju in 2017, a string quartet from the Escola de Artes Valdice Teles played before his concert in Praça General Valadão.

Some tours were financed by private companies through Brazil's federal cultural incentive law. Municipal governments supplied the concert sites, seating and local crews. The 2012 tour Brasil Sertões 2, sponsored by Ultragaz, passed through fifteen cities. Its Recife stop was the project's 443rd concert. The Santos concert one month earlier was numbered 435, and the Aracaju concert in May 2017 was numbered 533.

By 2018, Um Piano pela Estrada had given more than 500 concerts and travelled about 500,000 km (310,000 mi). Organizers estimated a total audience of about one million people. The trucks travelled through every region of Brazil and stopped in public squares, outlying neighbourhoods and towns where piano recitals were rare.

== Recordings ==
Moreira Lima's recordings covered Romantic piano literature, twentieth-century repertory and Brazilian music. His discography included concertos and solo works by Chopin, Brahms, Mozart and Rachmaninoff, alongside Brazilian repertory by Nazareth, Gnattali, Villa-Lobos, Brasílio Itiberê and Mignone.

The following discography lists album-length recordings, including collaborative albums and archival releases.

=== Principal and collaborative albums ===
Year	Title	Repertoire or collaborators	Label or format	Notes
1965	The VII International Chopin Piano Competition, Warsaw 1965	Frédéric Chopin	LP	Performances recorded during the VII International Chopin Piano Competition
1970	Chopin	Chopin	Concert Hall; LP	
1975	Arthur Moreira Lima interpreta Ernesto Nazareth, Vol. 1	Ernesto Nazareth	Discos Marcus Pereira MPA 9311; double LP	Reissued on compact disc in 2006
1976	Chopin: The 14 Waltzes	Chopin	Denon OX-7084; LP	
1976	Arthur Moreira Lima Interpreta Frédéric Chopin, Vol. 1	Chopin	EMI	
1977	Recital de Piano com Arthur Moreira Lima	Works by Bach, Villa-Lobos and Chopin	Phonodisc 0-34-405-392; LP	Recorded in Moscow
1977	Arthur Moreira Lima interpreta Ernesto Nazareth, Vol. 2	Nazareth	Discos Marcus Pereira MPA 9364–9365; double LP	
1979	Chorando Baixinho: Um Encontro Histórico	With Época de Ouro and Abel Ferreira	LP	Reissued on compact disc
1980	Parcelada Malunga	With Elomar	LP	
1981	Com Licença	Brazilian popular and concert music	LP	
1982	ConSertão: Um Passeio Musical pelo Brasil	With Elomar, Paulo Moura and Heraldo do Monte	LP	
1982	Tangos, Waltzes, Polkas of Ernesto Nazareth	Nazareth	Pro-Arte	International release
1984	Arthur Moreira Lima interpreta Ernesto Nazareth, Vol. 3	Nazareth	LP	
1984	Arthur Moreira Lima interpreta Ernesto Nazareth, Vol. 4	Nazareth	LP	
1984	The 767 Is Coming...	Promotional recital recording	LP	
1988	Tchaikovsky: As Estações	Pyotr Ilyich Tchaikovsky, The Seasons	LP	
1990	Cartão de Visita	Brazilian repertoire	CD	A later Karmi edition was issued in 1998
1992	O Boêmio & o Pianista	With Moreira da Silva	Album	
1997	Piano Interludes	Classical repertoire	Album	
1999	Arthur Moreira Lima Plays Piazzolla	Astor Piazzolla	Album	
1999	Arthur Moreira Lima interpreta Waldemar Henrique	Waldemar Henrique	CD	
2000	MPB Piano Collection	Brazilian popular music	Sony Music Brazil; six-CD set	The phonographic copyright is dated 1999

=== Album series ===
==== Meu Piano: Três Séculos de Música para Piano ====
Meu Piano, also marketed as Três Séculos de Música para Piano, was a 41-disc collection issued by Editora Caras. It combined earlier recordings with programmes devoted to particular composers and repertories.

Disc	Title or principal repertoire	Publisher
1	Clássicos Favoritos I	Editora Caras
2	Chopin I: Piano Concerto No. 1; Krakowiak	Editora Caras
3	Clássicos Favoritos II	Editora Caras
4	Sonatas Famosas	Editora Caras
5	Villa-Lobos I	Editora Caras
6	Chopin II: The 19 Waltzes	Editora Caras
7	Schumann & Liszt: Os Grandes Românticos	Editora Caras
8	Mozart & Haydn	Editora Caras
9	Ernesto Nazareth I	Editora Caras
10	Meu Piano, disc 10	Editora Caras
11	Chopin III	Editora Caras
12	Meu Piano, disc 12	Editora Caras
13	Scriabin, Tchaikovsky & Prokofiev: A Grande Escola Russa	Editora Caras
14	Rachmaninoff: Piano Concerto No. 3	Editora Caras
15	Chopin IV	Editora Caras
16	Astor Piazzolla	Editora Caras
17	Chopin V: The Polonaises, Volume I	Editora Caras
18	Villa-Lobos & Radamés Gnattali	Editora Caras
19	Chopin VI: 24 Preludes	Editora Caras
20	Clássicos Favoritos IV	Editora Caras
21	Mozart: Famous Sonatas	Editora Caras
22	Brahms: Piano Concerto No. 2	Editora Caras
23	Chopin: The Polonaises, Volume II	Editora Caras
24	Clássicos Favoritos V	Editora Caras
25	Chopin VII	Editora Caras
26	Meu Piano, disc 26	Editora Caras
27	Radamés Gnattali	Editora Caras
28	Meu Piano, disc 28	Editora Caras
29	Meu Piano, disc 29	Editora Caras
30	Brazílio Itiberê & Brazilian National Anthem	Editora Caras
31	Mussorgsky & Prokofiev: Dois Retratos da Rússia	Editora Caras
32	Meu Piano, disc 32	Editora Caras
33	Meu Piano, disc 33	Editora Caras
34	Clássicos Favoritos VII	Editora Caras
35	Clássicos Favoritos VIII	Editora Caras
36	Schumann & Liszt II	Editora Caras
37	Meu Piano, disc 37	Editora Caras
38	Clássicos Favoritos IX	Editora Caras
39	Chopin: The Sonatas	Editora Caras
40	Meu Piano, disc 40	Editora Caras
41	Chopin XII	Editora Caras

==== O Piano Brasileiro de Arthur Moreira Lima ====
Volume	Year	Title or principal repertoire	Label
1	2003	De Repente	Azul
2	2003	Com Licença	Azul
3	2003	Villa-Lobos	Azul
4	2003	Villa-Lobos II	Azul
5	2003	Villa-Lobos	Azul
6	2003	Ernesto Nazareth	Azul
7	2003	Ernesto Nazareth	Azul
8	2003	Francisco Mignone	Azul
9	2005	Radamés Gnattali	Azul
10	2003	Radamés Gnattali & Villa-Lobos	Azul
11	2003	Arthur e Seus Amigos	Azul

=== Video releases ===
Year	Title	Format	Notes
2012	Arthur Moreira Lima em 3 Movimentos	DVD	Issued by CNI–SESI

== Performances ==
=== Repertory and interpretation ===
Moreira Lima's programs brought together composers from different periods and countries. At a 1963 recital in Curitiba, he played Bach's Partita No. 1, Beethoven's Appassionata Sonata, Barber's Excursions, two works by Liszt and Villa-Lobos's Festa no sertão.

He studied in Paris with Marguerite Long and in Moscow with Rudolf Kehrer. Long emphasized clarity and control. Kehrer worked with him on phrasing, tone and the ability to make the piano "sing". Music critic Irineu Franco Perpetuo heard the French school in Moreira Lima's use of colour and phrasing, and the weight of the Russian school in his sound.

Chopin stayed in his programs from the beginning of his international career. Moreira Lima played the concertos and sonatas, as well as the ballades, scherzos, preludes, polonaises, mazurkas, nocturnes and waltzes. His recitals also drew on Schumann, Liszt, Brahms, Rachmaninoff, Mussorgsky and Prokofiev. Bach, Mozart and Beethoven were regular parts of his repertory as well.

Brazilian music was already part of his formal recitals by 1966. At the Theatro Municipal do Rio de Janeiro, he followed works by Schumann, Chopin and Prokofiev with Ernesto Nazareth's Batuque and Coração que sente as encores. Nazareth stayed in his concerts, and Moreira Lima made four album projects devoted to his music. He also played works by Heitor Villa-Lobos, Brasílio Itiberê da Cunha, Radamés Gnattali, Francisco Mignone and Waldemar Henrique.

From the late 1970s, he often played with musicians from choro and Brazilian popular music. His partners included Época de Ouro, Abel Ferreira, Paulo Moura, Raphael Rabello, Elomar Figueira Mello and Heraldo do Monte. He did not turn choro into simplified concert music. Its rhythms, accents and freedom stayed in the performance.

Moreira Lima also played Astor Piazzolla in piano transcriptions by Laércio de Freitas. He heard counterpoint, imitation and canon in Piazzolla's tangos and milongas, and programmed them beside European and Brazilian concert works without softening their musical character.

He believed that the pianist carried music from the page to the listener through choices of phrasing, timing and expression. A score, in his view, could not be played as a mechanical copy of its notation. Part of the music depended on what the performer heard and chose to bring forward.

=== Selected recitals and collaborations ===
Moreira Lima made his New York debut at Carnegie Recital Hall in November 1962 with a program of Bach, Beethoven and Chopin. John Gruen praised his technique in Bach and Beethoven in the New York Herald Tribune, and wrote of his "poetic flights" in Chopin.

In the 1970s, he gave solo recitals and played with orchestras across Europe and the Soviet Union. A 1977 recital in Moscow paired Bach's Chromatic Fantasia and Fugue with music from Villa-Lobos's A Prole do Bebê and Chopin's Piano Sonata No. 3. He played concertos by Chopin, Brahms, Mozart, Rachmaninoff and Tchaikovsky with orchestras in Warsaw, Moscow, Leningrad, Berlin, Vienna, Prague, London and Paris.

In 1981, Moreira Lima played Chopin's Piano Concerto No. 1 with the Brazilian Symphony Orchestra under Kurt Sanderling at the Theatro Municipal do Rio de Janeiro. That same year, he returned to the orchestra for Rachmaninoff's Rhapsody on a Theme of Paganini under Isaac Karabtchevsky. He also played Villa-Lobos's Piano Concerto No. 1 with the orchestra of the Theatro Municipal under Mário Tavares.

That September, Moreira Lima and João Carlos Martins performed Bach Meets Chopin at the 92nd Street Y in New York. Martins played the twenty-four preludes from the first book of Bach's The Well-Tempered Clavier, and Moreira Lima played Chopin's twenty-four preludes. They alternated the pieces in pairs. They performed the program again at Avery Fisher Hall in 1982.

On the night of the first Bach Meets Chopin concert, Moreira Lima also played at Alice Tully Hall with Paulo Moura, Raphael Rabello, Norton Morozowicz, Joel Nascimento and João Pedro Borges. Their program included choro by Patápio Silva, Ernesto Nazareth and Abel Ferreira. The next day, he returned to the 92nd Street Y for a solo Chopin recital with nocturnes, waltzes, the Barcarolle, the Polonaise-Fantaisie and the Second Sonata.

He returned to New York in 1982 with a recital that paired Chopin with Brazilian music. That year, he played Nazareth at the Library of Congress in Washington, D.C. Joseph McLellan wrote in The Washington Post that the concert introduced Nazareth to American listeners. Reviewing Moreira Lima's Nazareth albums in 1984, McLellan called his playing "fluent, technically assured and totally idiomatic".

The programs he took to public squares and smaller towns kept the same mixture of European and Brazilian music. A concert might begin with Bach, Beethoven or Chopin, then move to Villa-Lobos, Nazareth, Pixinguinha or Luiz Gonzaga. Moreira Lima brought the concert repertory to towns and neighbourhoods where piano recitals were rare, while giving Brazilian composers equal room on the program.

In 2021, Moreira Lima returned to Warsaw as a juror at the eighteenth International Chopin Piano Competition, fifty-six years after winning second prize there.

== Awards and honors ==
=== Competition prizes ===
Moreira Lima began winning competitions as a child. In 1949, at the age of nine, he won the Young Soloists competition of the Brazilian Symphony Orchestra by unanimous decision. He played Mozart's Piano Concerto No. 23 under Eleazar de Carvalho. Three years later, he won again with Beethoven's Piano Concerto No. 1.

In 1956, he won the Rádio MEC competition and received a scholarship to study in Paris. In 1960, he took first prize in the Académie Marguerite Long's Cours de Piano Supérieur and received an honorable mention at the Marguerite Long-Jacques Thibaud Competition. He won third prize at the third Rio de Janeiro International Piano Competition in 1962 and was the only Brazilian among the finalists.

In 1965, Moreira Lima won second prize at the VII International Chopin Piano Competition in Warsaw, behind Martha Argerich.

He won third prize at the Leeds International Piano Competition in 1969, behind Radu Lupu and Georges Pludermacher. In 1970, he shared third prize with Victoria Postnikova at the International Tchaikovsky Competition in Moscow.

=== Recording prizes and public honors ===
Moreira Lima received the Prêmio Sharp for his recordings in 1989 and 1990.

In 2001, he was made a Commander of the Order of Cultural Merit.

The Florianópolis City Council granted him honorary citizenship in 2003. Santa Catarina awarded him the Cruz e Sousa Medal of Cultural Merit in 2007.

In 2023, the Department of Keyboard Instruments at the Federal University of Rio de Janeiro's School of Music proposed that Moreira Lima receive an honorary doctorate. The school's congregation approved the proposal on 6 October.

The university awarded him the title of doctor honoris causa on 24 September 2024. Moreira Lima joined the ceremony from his home. His grandson, pianist Francisco Moreira Lima Pereira Lira, attended on his behalf.

== Death and critical reception ==
=== Final illness and death ===
Moreira Lima underwent treatment for intestinal cancer from 2023. On 24 September 2024, he took part by video in the ceremony at which the Federal University of Rio de Janeiro awarded him an honorary doctorate. His grandson, pianist Francisco Moreira Lima Pereira Lira, attended on campus in his place.

He died at his home in Florianópolis on 30 October 2024, aged 84. He had lived in the city for about thirty years. His wake was held the next day at Jardim da Paz in Florianópolis.

=== Critical reception ===
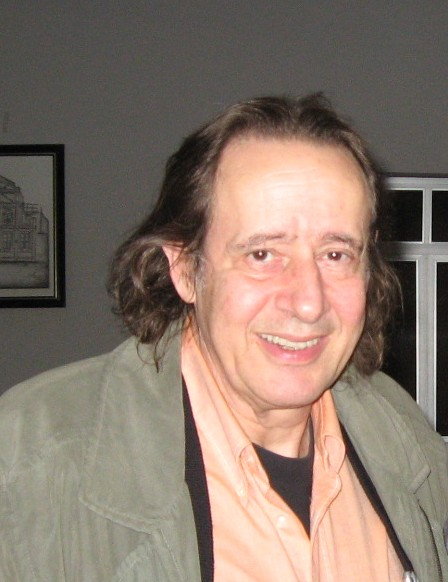
Moreira Lima in 2008

At his New York debut at Carnegie Recital Hall in 1962, John Gruen praised his technique in Bach and Beethoven in the New York Herald Tribune. He found a more lyrical side to his Chopin, writing of the young pianist's "poetic flights".

Moreira Lima drew an enthusiastic response at the VII International Chopin Piano Competition in Warsaw in 1965. The audience called him back thirteen times after his sonata performance, and his second-place finish behind Martha Argerich was followed by a long ovation. An Agence France-Presse report quoted Polish press praise for his technique, his understanding of Chopin and the sensitivity of his playing. After a recital at Wigmore Hall, The Daily Telegraph called him a pianist of "rare and unequalled talent".

In 1971, Emil Gilels wrote in Pravda that Moreira Lima was "a mature artist, with his own palette of sounds". Irineu Franco Perpetuo later heard elements of his training with Marguerite Long in his use of colour and phrasing. He found the weight and directness of Moreira Lima's sound closer to the Russian school and his years with Rudolf Kehrer in Moscow.

Chopin remained a constant in Moreira Lima's concerts and albums, though his strongest reviews were not limited to Chopin. Paulo Sampaio judged him at his best in the virtuoso music of Chopin, Schumann, Mussorgsky and Prokofiev. He recalled a pianist who could move from Liszt's Transcendental Étude No. 10 to a performance with Paulinho da Viola, or from Rachmaninoff with the Polish Radio Symphony Orchestra to music by Pixinguinha, Noel Rosa, Heitor Villa-Lobos and Radamés Gnattali. After his death, the European classical-music magazine Pizzicato called him "a major Chopin interpreter".

=== Brazilian repertory and public reputation ===
Moreira Lima was already pairing Brazilian pieces with European concert works by 1966. At the Theatro Municipal do Rio de Janeiro, he followed Schumann, Chopin and Prokofiev with Ernesto Nazareth's Batuque and Coração que sente. His 1975 double album of Nazareth's music led to further albums, recitals and releases devoted to the composer.

He played Nazareth at the Library of Congress in 1982. Reviewing two of his Nazareth albums in The Washington Post in 1984, Joseph McLellan called his playing "fluent, technically assured and totally idiomatic". McLellan heard the same technical ease in Moreira Lima's Chopin waltzes, but preferred the Nazareth albums because the music sounded fresher to him.

Luís Nassif wrote that Moreira Lima's Nazareth albums arrived during the revival of choro in the 1970s. Musicians around Gnattali and Raphael Rabello were reaching new listeners, while Moreira Lima brought Nazareth into recital halls and the record market with the standing he had gained abroad.

Nazareth was one part of Moreira Lima's Brazilian repertory. He played with choro musicians, singers and songwriters while keeping Chopin, Liszt, Brahms, Rachmaninoff and Prokofiev in his concert schedule. Perpetuo wrote that he resisted the usual division between concert and popular music, moving from solo recitals to performances with Época de Ouro, Elomar, Paulo Moura, Ney Matogrosso and Nelson Gonçalves.

His public concerts also changed how audiences encountered him in Brazil. Through Um Piano pela Estrada, he played in public squares, neighbourhoods and small towns where a grand piano recital was rare. At the ceremony for his honorary doctorate, UFRJ rector Roberto Medronho summed up this part of his career with the words, "He is where the people are."

Brazilian newspapers and broadcasters sometimes called him the "Pelé of the piano". The nickname referred to his virtuosity and to the familiarity he gained far beyond the usual concert audience.

== See also ==
- Nelson Freire, internationally acclaimed Brazilian classical pianist
- João Carlos Martins, Brazilian pianist and conductor noted for his interpretations of Bach
- Guiomar Novaes, Brazilian pianist regarded as one of the leading interpreters of the twentieth century
- Arnaldo Cohen, Brazilian pianist and winner of the 1972 Ferruccio Busoni International Piano Competition
- Cristina Ortiz, Brazilian pianist and winner of the 1969 Van Cliburn International Piano Competition
- Jacques Klein, Brazilian pianist and winner of the 1953 Geneva International Music Competition
- Magda Tagliaferro, Brazilian-born pianist and influential teacher associated with the French piano tradition
- Jean-Louis Steuerman, Brazilian pianist known for his performances of Bach and the Classical repertoire
- Roberto Szidon, Brazilian pianist noted for his recordings of Liszt and Scriabin
