= Maria Szraiber =

Polish pianist and music educator

Maria Szraiber is a Polish pianist and music educator. Born in the region of Silesia Szraiber graduated with the highest honours from the Karol Szymanowski Academy of Music and was taught by Bolesław Woytowicz and Wanda Chmielowska. She continued her studies at the Moscow Conservatory where she was taught by Tatiana Nikolayeva and Rudolf Kehrer. Szraiber has regularly performed worldwide as a soloist and chamber musician.

She is currently a full professor at Fryderyk Chopin University of Music where she had also been elected as the dean of the university's Department of Piano, Harpsichord and Organ along as the Head of Chair of Piano. For several years Szraiber had also conducted master classes in her native Poland as well as abroad, and has also been a jury member in several piano competitions. She also has presented a series of concert-lectures and reminiscences called Nestors of Polish Piano Playing. The result of which led to the publications which include biographies and reminiscences of several Polish pianists. Her interests in teaching allowed her to prepare a monograph on the book On Educating the Artist-Performer at the College Level of Piano Studies.

== Works ==
- Szraiber, Maria (2005). Nestors of Polish pianistics. Vol. 2. Fryderyk Chopin Academy of Music in Warsaw. ISBN 978-83-89444-42-4.

translators: Sloan Anthony, Młożniak Ewa

== Honors ==
- Order of the Rising Sun, 3rd Class, Gold Rays with Neck Ribbon (2020)
