= Marta Sosińska =

Polish pianist

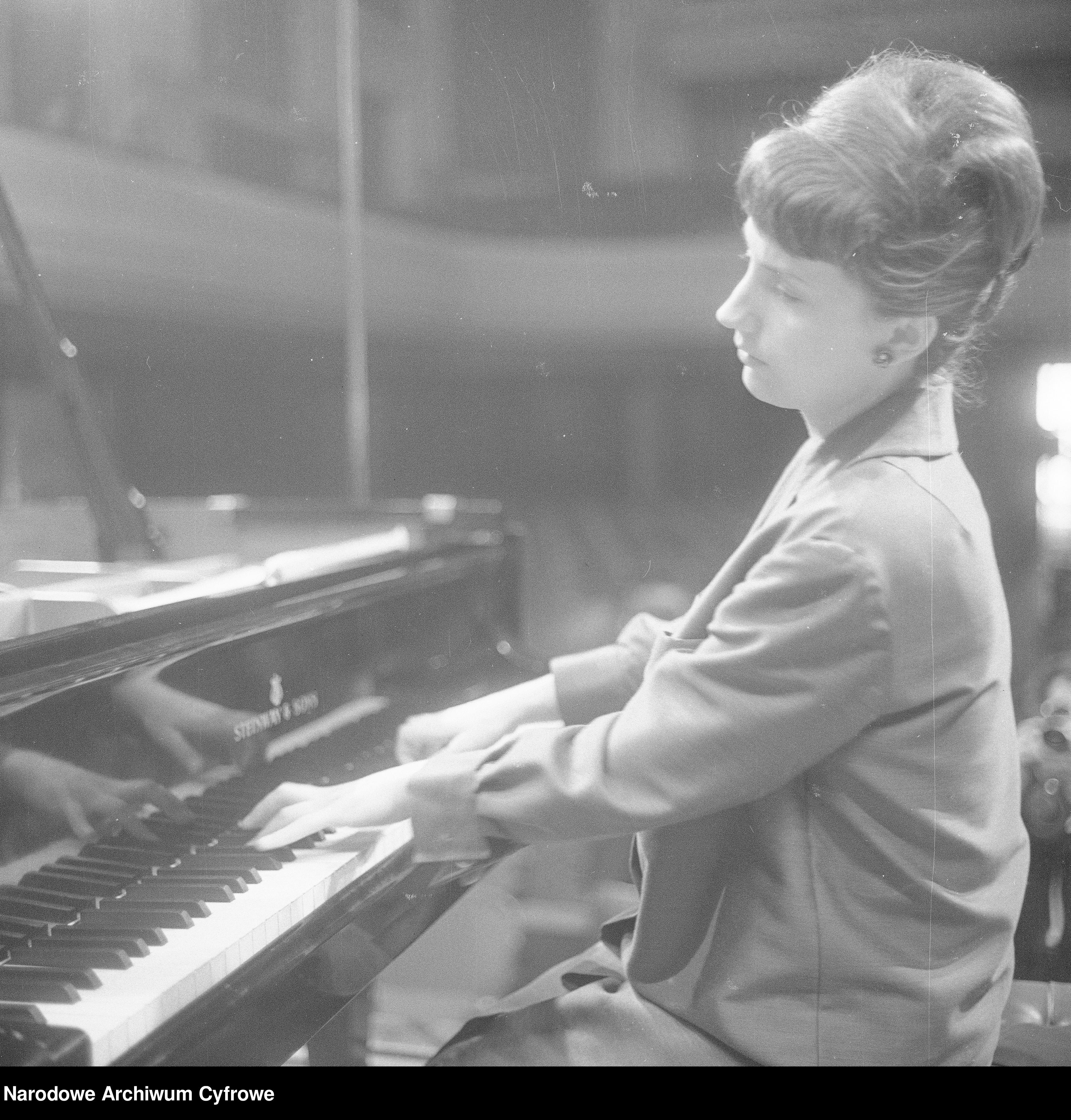
Marta Sosińska playing the piano

Marta Sosińska-Janczewska (born 4 October 1939, in Warsaw) is a Polish classical pianist.

She studied at the State Higher School of Music in Warsaw under Zbigniew Drzewiecki.

In 1965 she was awarded 3rd prize at the VII International Chopin Piano Competition.

Marta Sosińska subsequently contributed to a recording of Chopin's complete works. From 1985 to 2002 she held a post as professor at the University of Music Würzburg in Germany, where she lives.
