= Edward Auer =

American musician

Edward Auer (born December 7, 1941, in New York City) is an American classical pianist. In 1965, he became the first American to win a prize in the VII International Chopin Piano Competition. Due to his frequent and subsequent touring in Poland, Mr. Auer is recognized worldwide as one of the leading interpreters of Frédéric Chopin. Auer has also displayed his consummate skill and broad repertoire—from Mozart, Beethoven, Schubert, and Schumann to Rachmaninoff, Ravel, Stravinsky, Shostakovich, and others—while touring the U.S., Europe, and Asia. He is currently a Professor of Piano at the Jacobs School of Music of Indiana University in Bloomington, Indiana.

== Early life ==
While growing up in Los Angeles, Auer studied piano under Aube Tzerko and composition with Leonard Stein. Auer continued his studies at the Juilliard School of Music under the tutelage of Rosina Lhévinne and for two years in Paris on a Fulbright Study Grant under Julius Katchen.

== Career ==
Auer won the Young Concert Artists International Auditions in 1964 and was a prize winner at the prestigious VII International Chopin Piano Competition in 1965. He was the first American to win a prize at the latter competition.

According to Robert Cummings at Allmusic, "The mid-'60s were a pivotal time for the young pianist: in 1964 he won the Young Concert Artists International Auditions; the following year he finished fifth in the Chopin Competition (Warsaw) and second in the International Beethoven Piano Competition Vienna; he captured fifth in the 1966 Tchaikovsky (Moscow) and first in the 1967 Long-Thibaud Competition in Paris. In the midst of these successes, Auer made his debut at Carnegie Hall (1964) playing the Chopin Second Piano Concerto and launched his first U.S./Canadian tour (1965–1966), giving recitals and appearing with major orchestras like the Los Angeles Philharmonic."

Since his 1964 New York debut in Carnegie Hall under the auspices of Young Concert Artists, Auer has spent his career playing extensively throughout the United States, Europe, and Asia, performing solo recitals and concerts in 30 countries, including the United States, Europe, Japan, Israel, and Australia. Since 1965, Auer has performed more than twenty tours in Poland alone.

According to his website, Auer has performed as a soloist with the Los Angeles Philharmonic; the Detroit, Atlanta, and Baltimore symphonies; NHK Tokyo; RIAS Orchestra Berlin; Orchestre National Paris; and many others.

== Style ==
Auer is known to perform with a stoic demeanor. Herald Times music critic Peter Jacobi captures the essence of an Auer performance, "He plays with enviable force and clarity. The show of emotion so absent in his demeanor floods from his fingers."

== Recordings ==
Edward Auer has recorded for RCA Japan, Toshiba EMI, Erato, Camerata, TownHall, and other labels.

In November 2008, Auer released his latest recording Chopin Nocturnes vol. 1 on his privately owned and independent label, Culture Demain Recordings.

Auer's first recording has received praise from classical music critic Harris Goldsmith, who says of Chopin Nocturnes vol. 1, "Auer’s eloquence and technical powers have deepened and attained additional communicative and interpretative mastery, but this new anthology undoubtedly takes an honored place alongside the greatest extant editions of these copiously recorded masterpieces, e.g. Rubinstein’s c. 1938 versions, Ivan Moravec’s, and Tamas Vasary’s—to name my few favorites."

In multiple interviews, Auer has stated that Chopin Nocturnes vol. 1 is the first of eight volumes that he will release in celebration of Frédéric Chopin's life. He has also said that the Chopin project is purposely timed to coincide with the bicentennial celebration of Chopin's birth in 2010.

== Selected discography ==
Violin Sonata No. 9, Amaj, opus 47 (Kreutzer) („Kreutzer Sonata“) — 3rd movement. This recording was made in 1982, at the Lakeside School in Seattle.

- Chopin: Two Piano Concertos, 2010, Bloomington, IN: Culture/Demain Recordings; with Shanghai Quartet
- Chopin: Nocturnes vol. 2 and Four Scherzi, 2008, Bloomington, IN: Culture/Demain Recordings
- Chopin: Nocturnes vol. 1, 2007, Bloomington, IN: Culture/Demain Recordings
- Chopin: The Complete Waltzes (19 Waltzes), 1999, New York: Camerata Tokyo
- Chopin: Four Ballades, 1989, New York: Camerata Tokyo
