= VII International Chopin Piano Competition =

Piano competition (1965)

The Seventh International Fryderyk Chopin Piano Competition
- Date: 21 February – 16 March 1965
- Venue: National Philharmonic, Warsaw
- Hosted by: Fryderyk Chopin Society
- Winner: (Argentina) Martha Argerich

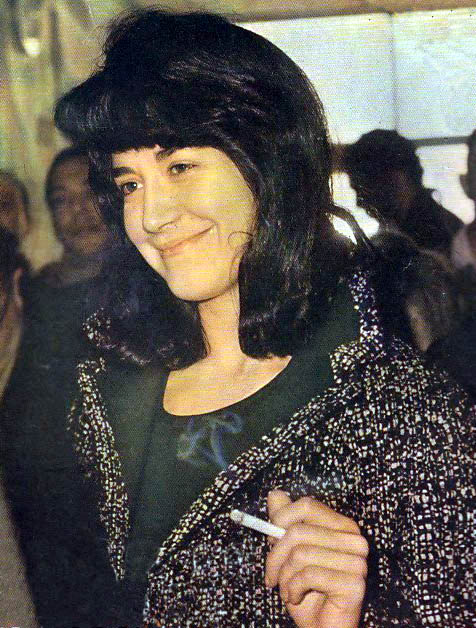
Martha Argerich won the competition

The VII International Chopin Piano Competition (Polish: VII Międzynarodowy Konkurs Pianistyczny im. Fryderyka Chopina) was held from 21 February to 16 March 1965 in Warsaw. The competition was won by Martha Argerich of Argentina, becoming the first and so far only South American winner.

== Awards ==
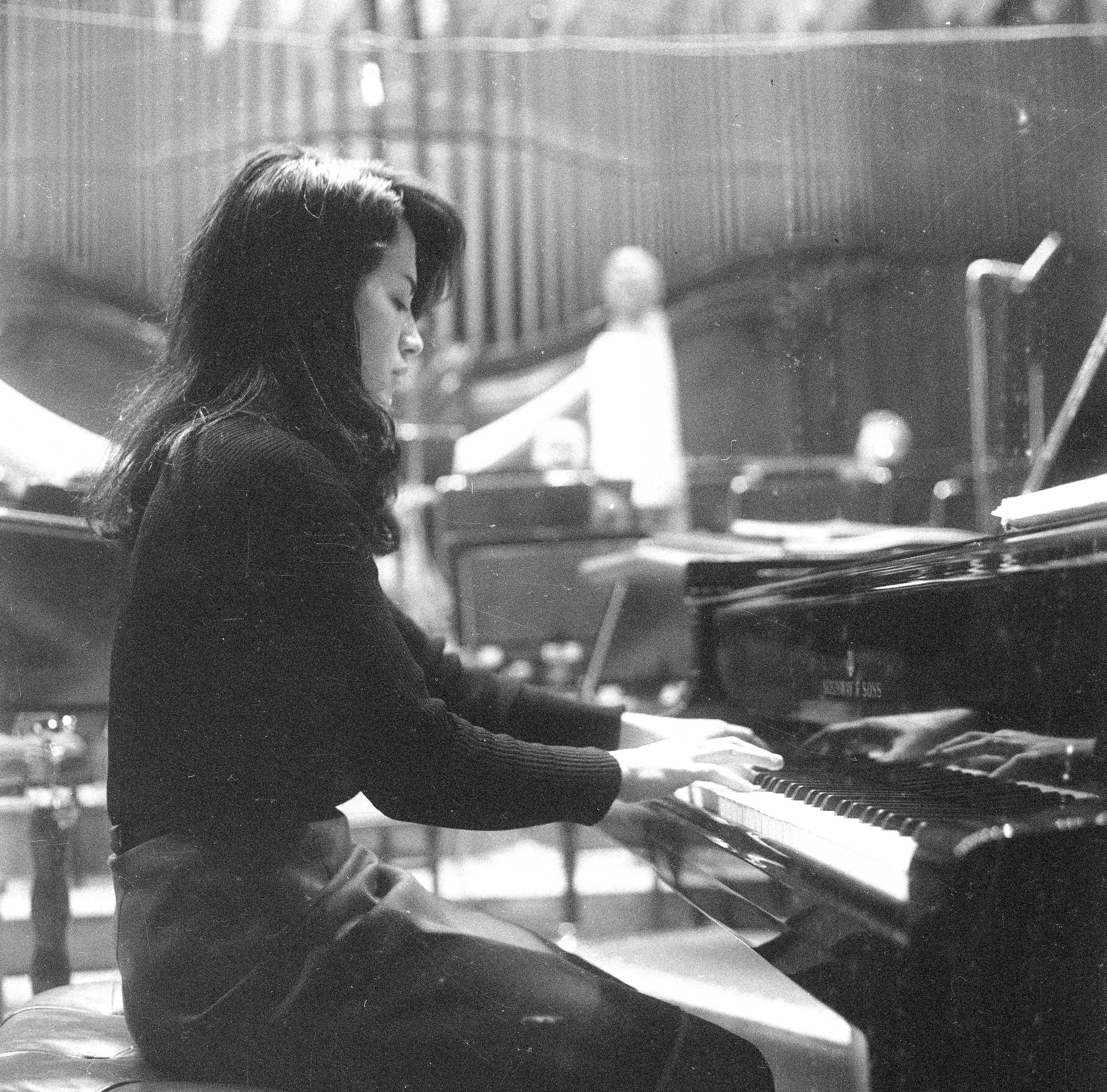
Martha Argerich during a rehearsal with the orchestra for the final

The competition consisted of three elimination stages and a final with six pianists.

The following prizes were awarded:

Prize		Winner	
1st	40,000zł	Martha Argerich	Argentina
2nd	30,000zł	Arthur Moreira Lima	Brazil
3rd	25,000zł	Marta Sosińska	Poland
4th	20,000zł	Hiroko Nakamura	Japan
5th	15,000zł	Edward Auer	United States
6th	10,000zł	Elżbieta Głąbówna	Poland
HM	5,000zł	Marek Jabłoński	Canada
HM	5,000zł	Tamara Kołoss	Soviet Union
HM	5,000zł	Lois Carole Pachucki	United States
HM	5,000zł	Viktoria Postnikova	Soviet Union
HM	5,000zł	Blanka Uribe	Colombia
HM	5,000zł	Ewa Maria Żuk	Venezuela

Two special prizes were awarded:

Special prize	Winner	
Best Performance of Mazurkas	Martha Argerich	Argentina
Best Performance of a Polonaise	Marta Sosińska	Poland

== Jury ==
The jury consisted of:

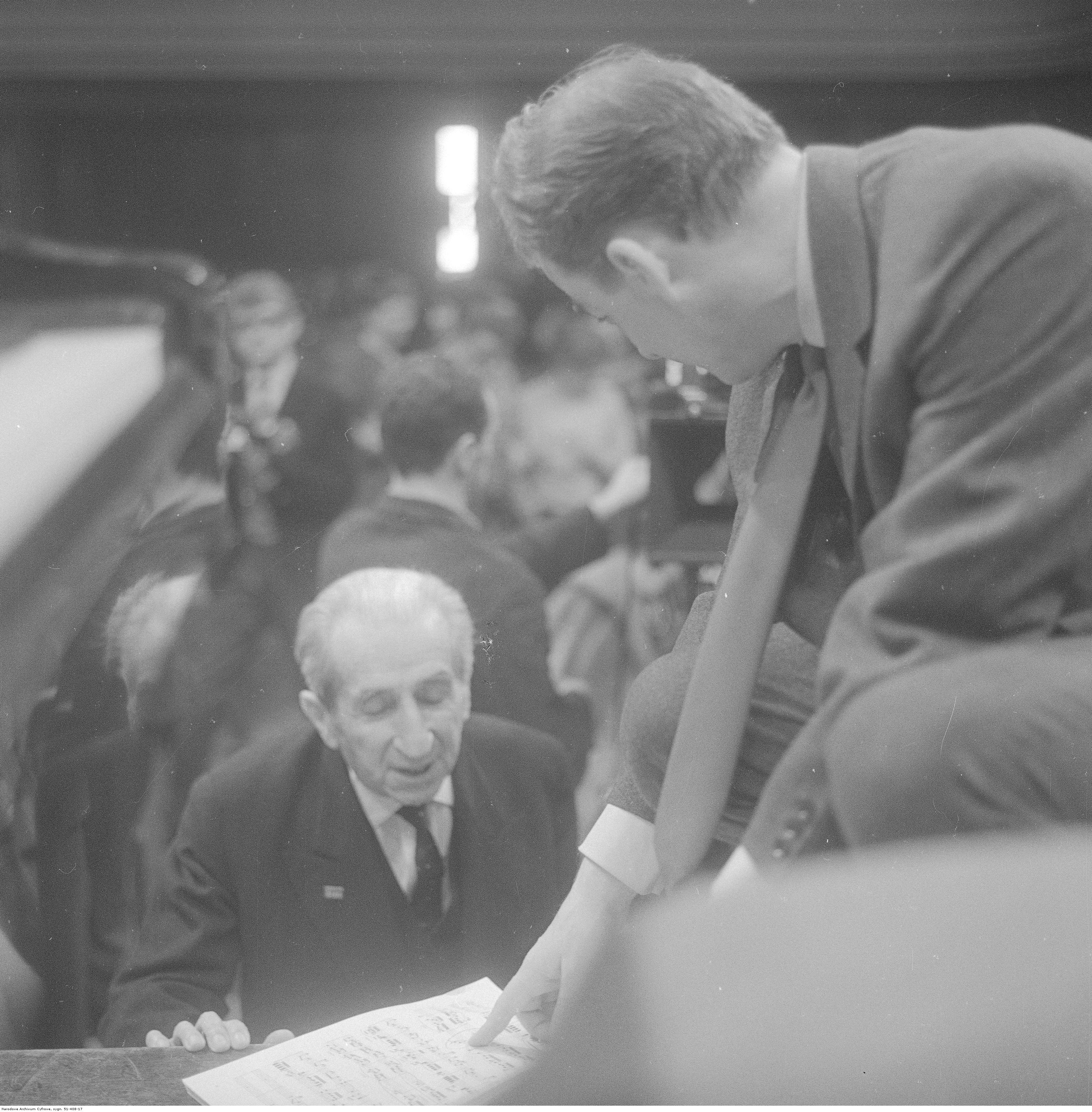
Jury chairman Zbigniew Drzewiecki in conversation with conductor Witold Rowicki during a rehearsal for the final

- (Poland) Zbigniew Drzewiecki (chairman)
- (Poland) Jan Ekier
- (Soviet Union) Yakov Flier (vice-chairman)
- (United Kingdom) Arthur Hedley (vice-chairman)
- (Poland) Jan Hoffman
- (Hungary) Pal Kadosa
- (United States) Eugene List
- (Socialist Federal Republic of Yugoslavia) Ivo Maček
- (Switzerland) Nikita Magaloff
- (Finland) Timo Mikkilä
- (France) Vlado Perlemuter
- (Czechoslovakia) Frantisek Rauch
- (Italy) Renzo Silvestri
- (Bulgaria) Veselin Stoyanov
- (Brazil) Magda Tagliaferro
- (Romania) Sigismund Toduță
- (Poland) Margerita Trombini-Kazuro
- (East Germany) Amadeus Webersinke
- (Poland) Maria Wiłkomirska
- (Poland) Bolesław Woytowicz
- (Poland) Jerzy Żurawlew
