= There's a Long Long Trail A-Winding =

"There's a Long, Long Trail"

Song
- Published: 1914
- Composer: Alonzo Elliot
- Lyricist: Stoddard King

"There's a Long, Long Trail" is a popular song of World War I. The lyrics were by Stoddard King (1889–1933) and the music by Alonzo "Zo" Elliott, both seniors at Yale. It was published in London in 1914, but a December 1913 copyright (which, like all American works made before 1923, has since expired) for the music is claimed by Zo Elliott.

In Elliott's own words to Marc Drogin shortly before his death in 1964, he created the music as an idle pursuit one day in his dorm room at Yale in 1913. King walked in, liked the music and suggested a first line. Elliott sang out the second, and so they went through the lyrics. And they performed it—with trepidation—before the fraternity that evening. The interview was published as an article in the New Haven Register and later reprinted in Yankee magazine. It then appeared on page 103 of The Best of Yankee Magazine ISBN 0-89909-079-6 In the interview, he recalled the day and the odd circumstances that led to the creation of this historic song.

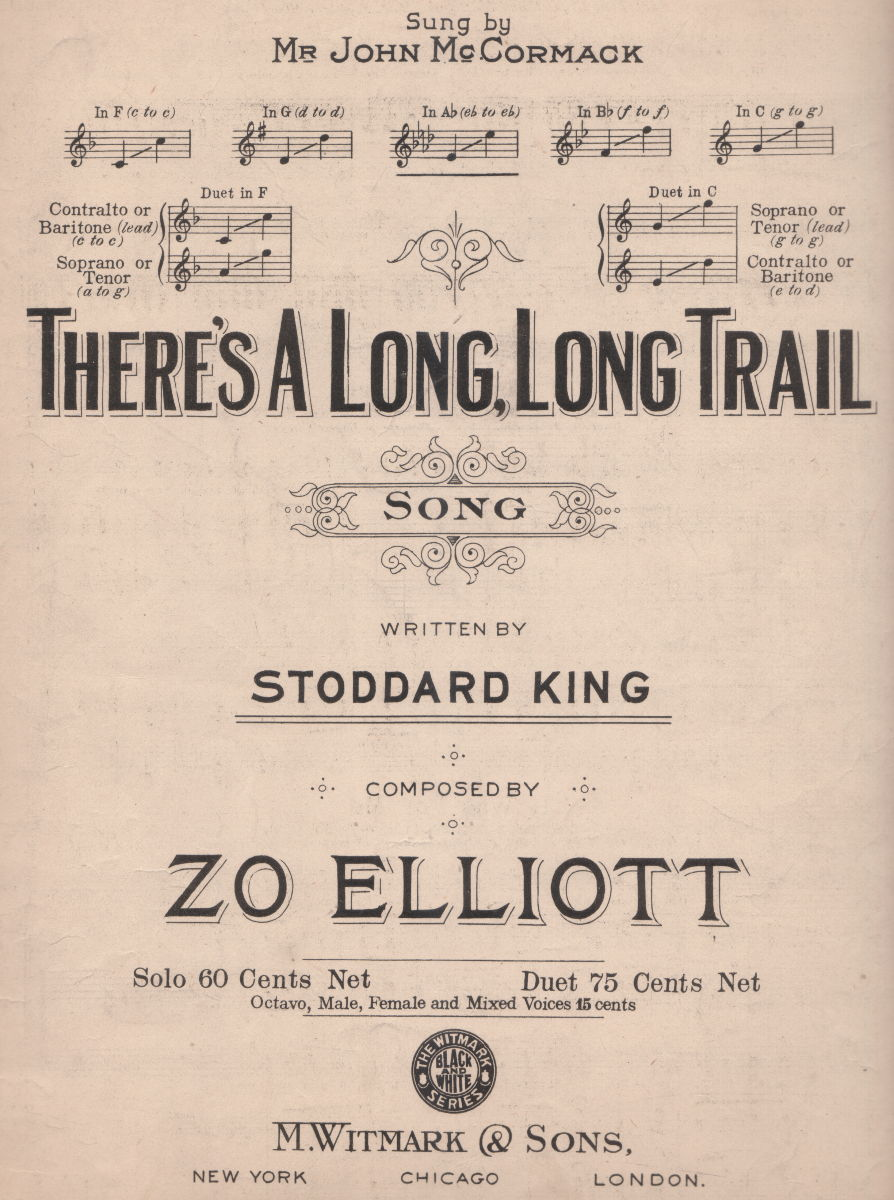
1914 Sheet Music Edition

== Lyrics ==
Nights are growing very lonely,
Days are very long;
I'm a-growing weary only
List'ning for your song.
Old remembrances are thronging
Thro' my memory
Till it seems the world is full of dreams
Just to call you back to me.

Chorus:

There's a long, long trail a-winding
Into the land of my dreams,
Where the nightingales are singing
And the white moon beams.
There's a long, long night of waiting
Until my dreams all come true;
Till the day when I'll be going down
That long, long trail with you.

All night long I hear you calling,
Calling sweet and low;
Seem to hear your footsteps falling,
Ev'ry where I go.
Tho' the road between us stretches
Many a weary mile,
I forget that you're not with me yet
When I think I see you smile.

Chorus:

There's a long, long trail a-winding
Into the land of my dreams,
Where the nightingales are singing
And the white moon beams.
There's a long, long night of waiting
Until my dreams all come true;
Till the day when I'll be going down
That long, long trail with you.

== Film ==
- There's a Long, Long Trail (1926) by H. Brian White. Black and white animated film.
- Smilin' Through (1941). Sung by Jeanette MacDonald with a male chorus.
- Random Harvest (1942). Among the songs sung by a crowd celebrating the war's end early in the film
- For Me and My Gal (1942). Sung by The King's Men.
- Thirty Seconds Over Tokyo (1944). Sung by officers and guests in Goodbye Dance scene.
- Three Came Home (1950)
- Dumb Patrol (1964). Music over opening titles in this Bugs Bunny short.
- Oh, What a Lovely War! (1969) by Richard Attenborough.
- Escape from Tomorrow (2013) chorus sung by Roy Abramsohn.

== Television ==
- Schroeder performs the song on piano for Snoopy in It's the Great Pumpkin, Charlie Brown.
- Charlie Brown and his fellow summer campers sing the song around the campfire in It Was a Short Summer, Charlie Brown as the scene dissolves into the next morning's reveille.
- In M*A*S*H, Colonel Potter, Hawkeye, and B.J. sing a chorus in harmony near the end of the season four episode "Change of Command".
- Students at Bamfylde School sing the song in To Serve Them All My Days.
- Jack Ford (James Bolam) and Matt Headley (Malcolm Terris) get drunk and sing this together in an episode of When The Boat Comes In.
- Fictional character Jason Walton performs a portion of the song in The Waltons episode "The Hero".
- In an episode of The Lucy Show, Lucy and Viv sing the first two lines of the chorus in a failed attempt to entertain their children after the TV set breaks down.
- In episode five of The Crimson Field the VADs (Flora Marshall, Rosalie Berwick and Kitty Trevelyan) perform this song together at a concert organised by Flora.
- In "Death & Histeria", Season 3, Episode 5 of Miss Fisher's Murder Mysteries, Phryne Fisher (Essie Davis), Cec (Anthony Sharpe) and Dr. Samuels (Philip Quast) perform the song for Aunt Prudence (Miriam Margolyes).

== Fiction ==
- In the 1934 novel The Postman Always Rings Twice by James M. Cain, the first two verses of the chorus are quoted at the beginning of Chapter 7. (ISBN 0-679-72325-0 (pbk.), p. 39).
- In author Russell Kirk's short story "There's a Long, Long Trail A-Winding".
- In John Dos Passos's novel, 1919, the lyric is featured in Newsreel XXII.
- In R.C. Sheriffs play, Journeys End, the song is sung in Act 3, Scene 3.
- Though not mentioned by name, the song is sung in the Amelia Peabody book He Shall Thunder in the Sky; it is identifiable by the lyric mentioned “long, long time of waiting”.
