= Alonzo Elliot =

American songwriter (1891–1964)

- Born: May 25, 1891; Manchester, New Hampshire, US
- Died: June 25, 1964 (aged 73); Wallingford, Connecticut, US
- Occupation(s): songwriter, composer

Alonzo "Zo" Elliot (May 25, 1891 – June 25, 1964) was an American composer and songwriter.

== Early life ==
Born in Manchester, New Hampshire, Elliot was educated at St. Paul’s School in Concord, New Hampshire, Phillips Academy (Andover, Massachusetts), Yale University, Cambridge University, and Columbia Law School. He also studied music privately with Nadia Boulanger and Leonard Bernstein, among others.

== "There's a Long, Long Trail" ==
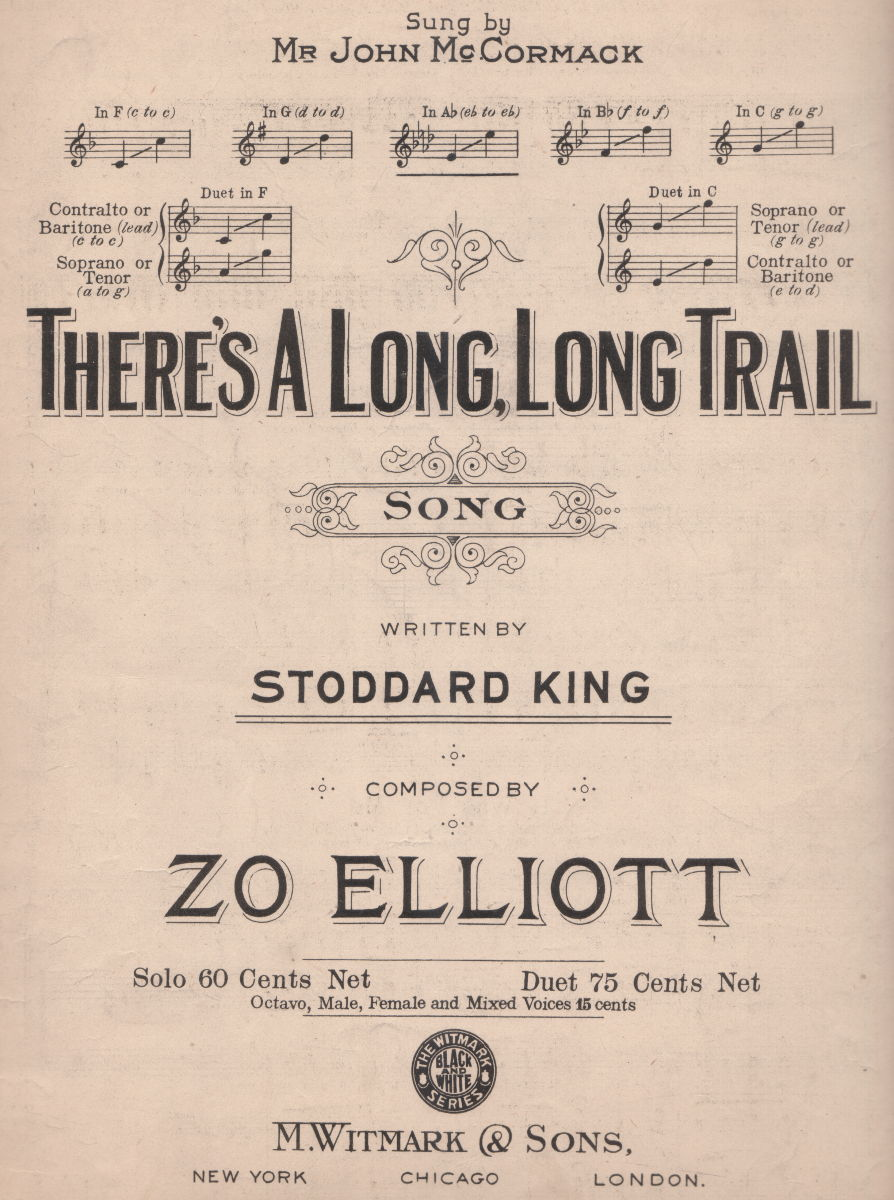
1914 Sheet Music Edition

His best-known composition is "There's a Long Long Trail A-Winding", a popular song from the era of World War I. Elliott wrote the music, and Stoddard King, Elliot's chief song collaborator, wrote the lyrics, when they were seniors at Yale. The song was published in London in 1914 (no U.S. publisher would gamble on it), but a December 1913 copyright for the music is claimed by Zo Elliot.

In Elliot's own words told to me shortly before his death in 1964, he created the music as an idle pursuit one day in his dorm room at Yale in 1913. King walked in, liked the music and suggested a first line. Elliot sang out the second, and so they went through the lyrics. And they performed it—with trepidation—before the fraternity that evening. The interview was published as an article in the New Haven Register and later reprinted in Yankee Magazine. It then appeared on page 103 of "The Best of Yankee Magazine" ISBN 0-89909-079-6 In the interview he recalled the day and the odd circumstances that led to the creation of this historic song. I'm so pleased to have caught the details for history. — Marc Drogin

== Other works ==
Elliot composed the well-known march “British Eighth”. It was written in tribute to General Bernard Montgomery and the Eighth Army and was copyrighted in 1943 for publishing in 1944.

He also composed as an opera entitled Top Sergeant. In addition, he wrote an article on the background of the American Civil War song "John Brown's Body" (“John Brown’s body lies a-mouldering in his grave,” sung to a melody later to become more famous as the melody to “The Battle Hymn of the Republic"); the article purported to show that the John Brown of the song was a soldier in Boston, not the famous abolitionist of the same name.

Elliot died age 73 at the Gaylord Farm Hospital in Wallingford, Connecticut on June 25, 1964.
