= Daddy, Come Home =

1913 song by Irving Berlin

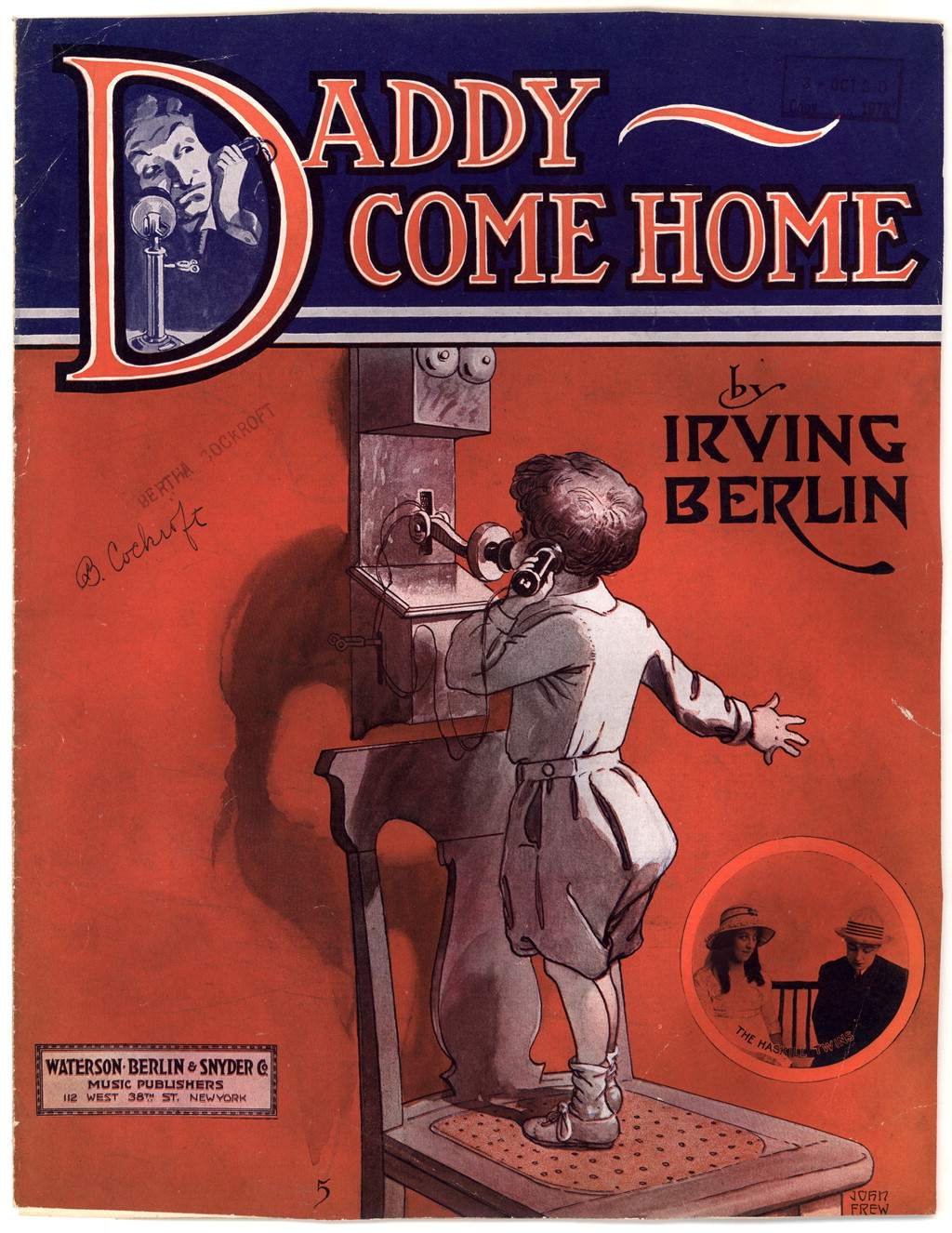

Daddy, Come Home is a song written by Irving Berlin and first published in 1913. The humorous song begins "Hello Central, dear Central, listen here: please connect me with my father" and tells the story from the point of view of a young boy calling his father on the telephone to ask him to leave work and deal with an assortment of family problems at home.

The song was recorded on December 13, 1913, by Billy Murray for The Victor Talking Machine Company (No. 14167).

== See also ==
- The telephone in United States history
