= Waldemar Henrique =

Brazilian pianist and composer (1905–1995)

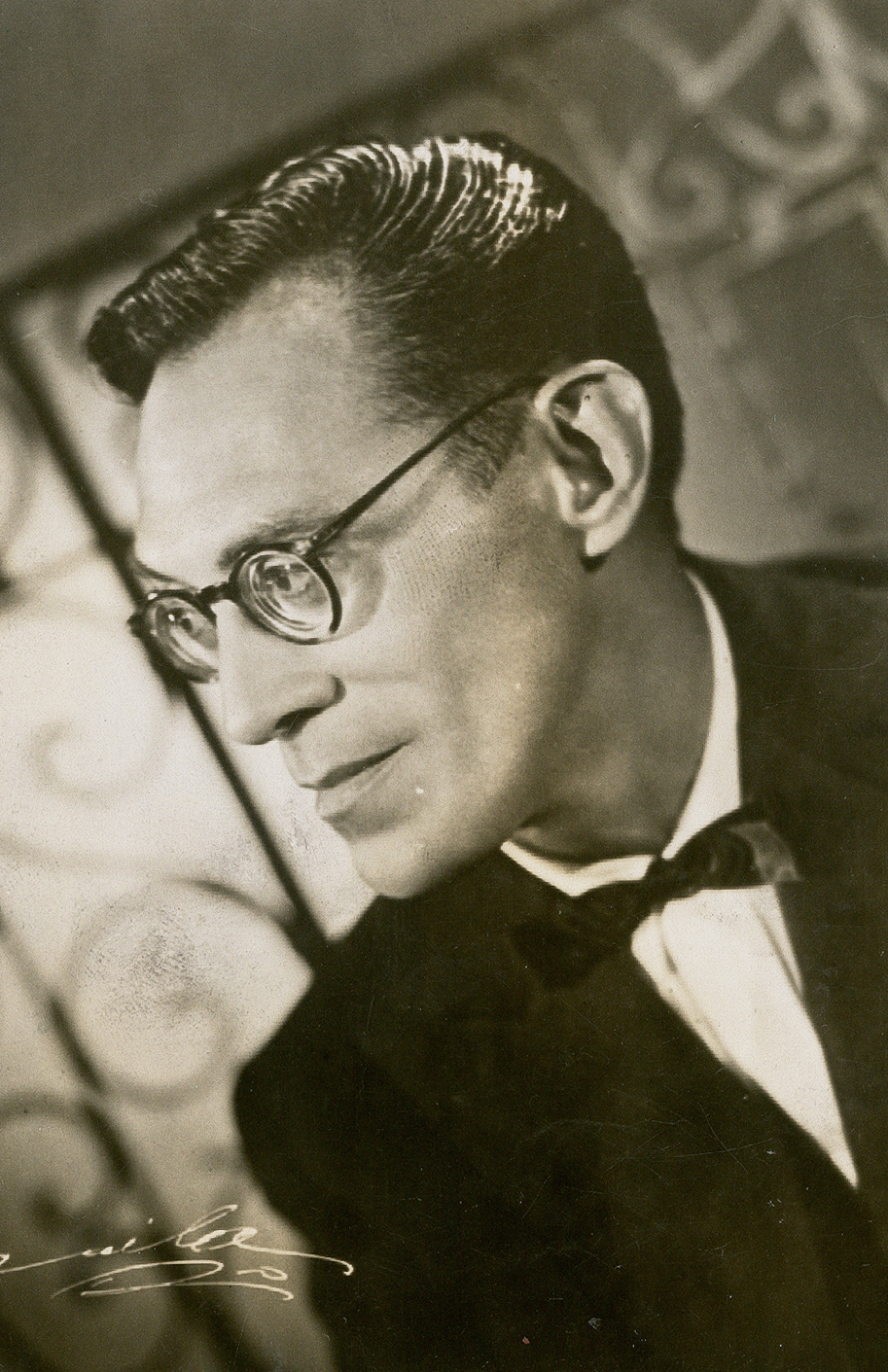
Waldemar Henrique,1949

Waldemar Henrique da Costa Pereira (February 15, 1905 – March 29, 1995) was a Brazilian pianist and composer.

Waldemar Henrique was born in Belém do Pará, Brazil, of mixed Portuguese and indigenous parentage. After losing his mother early in life, he went to Portugal with this father, returning to Brazil in 1918. Then he began travelling through the Amazon rainforest, and started to become acquainted with amazon culture and folklore that would later be significant on his musical work.

The first successful work he composed was Minha Terra (My Land), written in 1923. In 1929 he studied on the Conservatório Carlos Gomes. His family was against his musical career, and his father insisted him to give it up by employing him on a bank.

He moved to Rio de Janeiro in 1933, where he studied piano, composition, orchestration and conduction. His works have as main themes the amazon, indigenous, northeastern and afro-Brazilian folklore.
