= I'm Gonna Pin My Medal on the Girl I Left Behind =

1918 Song by Irving Berlin

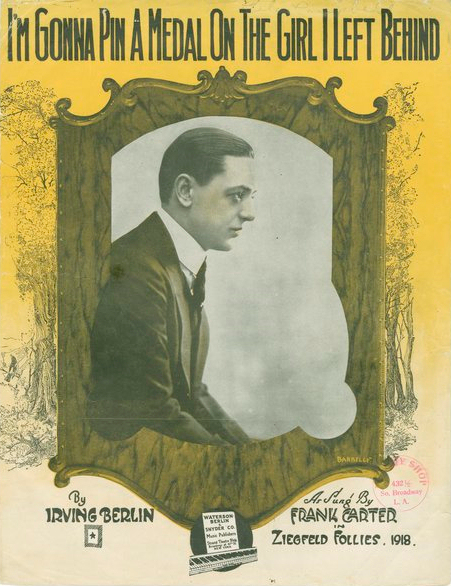

Song
- Published: 1918
- Songwriter: Irving Berlin

"I'm Gonna Pin My Medal on the Girl I Left Behind" is a World War I era song about a soldier named Johnny dreaming of coming home and giving his medal to his sweetheart. The song was first featured in Ziegfeld Follies of 1918. It reached the top 20 in August 1918 and climbed even higher to number 14 in September 1918. It was written and composed by Irving Berlin, produced by Waterson, Berlin & Snyder Co., and recorded by the Peerless Quartet. The song is listed as part of the US Library of Congress Recorded Sound Research Center (16,626), the National Jukebox (16,441) and the Recorded Sound Section, Library of Congress (6,098)

Per the lyrics, the soldier believes that his sweetheart has endured greater difficulties during the war than he has and wants to giver her his medal because he thinks she deserves it more than he does. Ann Ommen van der Merwe notes that the song shows the highly visible roles that American women took during World War I and that, while praise for women was not unusual in Ziegfeld Follies, praise for something other than beauty was new. She goes on to speculate that the medal may have been a metaphor for the right to vote, considering it "unlikely but not impossible" that this was Berlin's intent.
