= Brasílio Itiberê da Cunha =

Brazilian composer (1846–1913)

Brasílio Itiberê
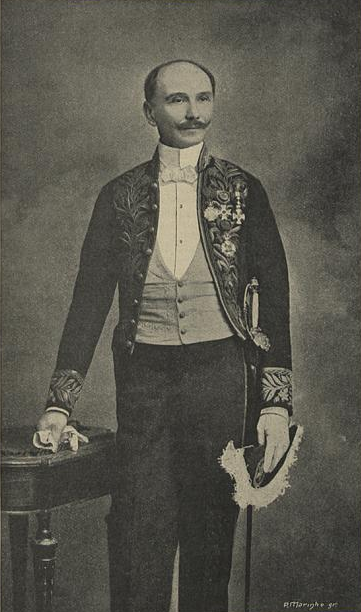
- Born: 1 August 1846; Paranaguá, Empire of Brazil
- Died: 11 August 1913 (aged 67); Berlin, German Empire

Brasílio Itiberê da Cunha (1 August 1846 – 11 August 1913) was a Brazilian composer, lawyer and diplomat. Itiberê was the sibling of poet and critic (literary and musical) João Itiberê da Cunha and uncle of composer Brasílio Itiberê da Cunha Luz.

== Biography ==
Brasílio Itiberê was born in the coastal city of Paranaguá, the son of João Manuel (Itiberê?) da Cunha and Maria Munhoz Lourenço da Cunha. He attended primary school in his homeland and his musical initiation was at the piano, learning at his parents' home.

Already renowned as a pianist in his youth he moved to São Paulo to attend the Faculty of Law at the Largo of São Francisco, performing several concerts in this city. After obtaining a BA in Law he joined the diplomatic service in the diplomatic corps serving in Italy, Peru, Belgium, Paraguay and Germany.

Without leaving music aside, Brasílio maintained friendly relations with some of the greatest pianists of his time such as Anton Rubinstein, Sgambati and Liszt.

Considered to be one of the forerunners of Brazilian nationalistic music Itiberê drew early inspiration from popular motifs and his work and style are distinctly Brazilian.

He composed chamber and choral music and works for piano solo. His rhapsody A Sertaneja was popularized by the famous song "Balaio, meu bem, Balaio.". His best-known composition is undoubtedly "A Sertaneja", (1869).

Itiberê was appointed ambassador to Portugal but died before assuming the role. He died in Berlin on August 11, 1913, aged 67. One of the many tributes to the author of "A Sertaneja" is in Curitiba, where the road Rua Brasílio Itiberê is named after him.

== Recordings ==
- (1995) Arthur Moreira Lima interpreta Brazílio Itiberê (includes Opp. 15, 19, 22, 27, 32/3, 33, 41, A Serrana and Gottschalk's Triumphal Fantasy on Brazilian national hymn) — Fundação cultural de Curitiba: Obras selecionadas
- (2013-2018) Giséle Rizental interpreta Brasílio Itiberê da Cunha, Vol. 01, Vol. 02, Vol. 03 (Containing several pieces by the composer)

== Sources and references ==
- MARCONDES, Marcos Antônio. Enciclopédia Música Brasileira. São Paulo: Art Editora/Publifolha, 1998.
- PIRES, Fernando. Grande Enciclopédia Universal - Magister. Ed. Amazonas, 1980.
- MURICY, José Candido de A. Panorama do Conto Paranaense. Curitiba: Fundação Cultural de Curitiba, 1979.
