= Rudolf Kehrer =

Soviet and Russian pianist (1923–2013)

Rudolf Kehrer Рудольф Керер
- Born: 10 July 1923; Tiflis, Georgian SSR, Soviet Union
- Died: 29 October 2013 (aged 90) Berlin, Germany
- Genres: Classical
- Occupations: Pianist; Piano teacher; Conductor
- Instrument: Piano

Rudolf Kehrer (Note: German: Rudolf Kehrer; Russian: Рудольф Рихардович Керер, romanized: Rudolf Rikhardovich Kerer; Georgian: რუდოლფ კერერი, romanized: Rudolp K’ereri) (10 July 1923 – 29 October 2013) was a Soviet and Russian classical pianist.

== Biography ==
Kehrer was born in Tiflis, Georgia (later Tbilisi, Georgia) to a family of piano-makers who had emigrated from Swabia. He was a solo pianist of the Moscow Philharmonic Orchestra and professor at the Tchaikovsky Conservatory. In 1961, he won the All-Union Contest. Kehrer was long known only in Eastern bloc countries, as he was denied the opportunity to travel freely. His recording career lasted for over 40 years (1961–2001) in many diverse locations.

Kehrer last lived in Berlin and died in that city on October 29, 2013, at the age of 90.
