= San Francisco Bound =

Irving Berlin song

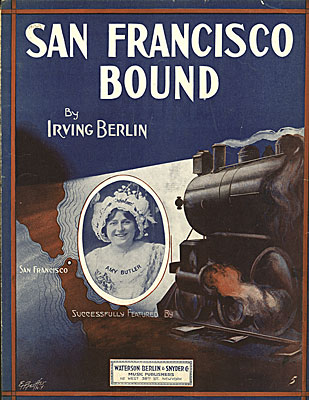

"San Francisco Bound" is a song by Irving Berlin, published by the Berlin & Snyder Company in 1913. The sheet music's cover proclaims that it was "successfully featured by Amy Butler". A recording by the Peerless Quartet was popular in 1913.
