= Eric Lu =

American pianist (born 1997)

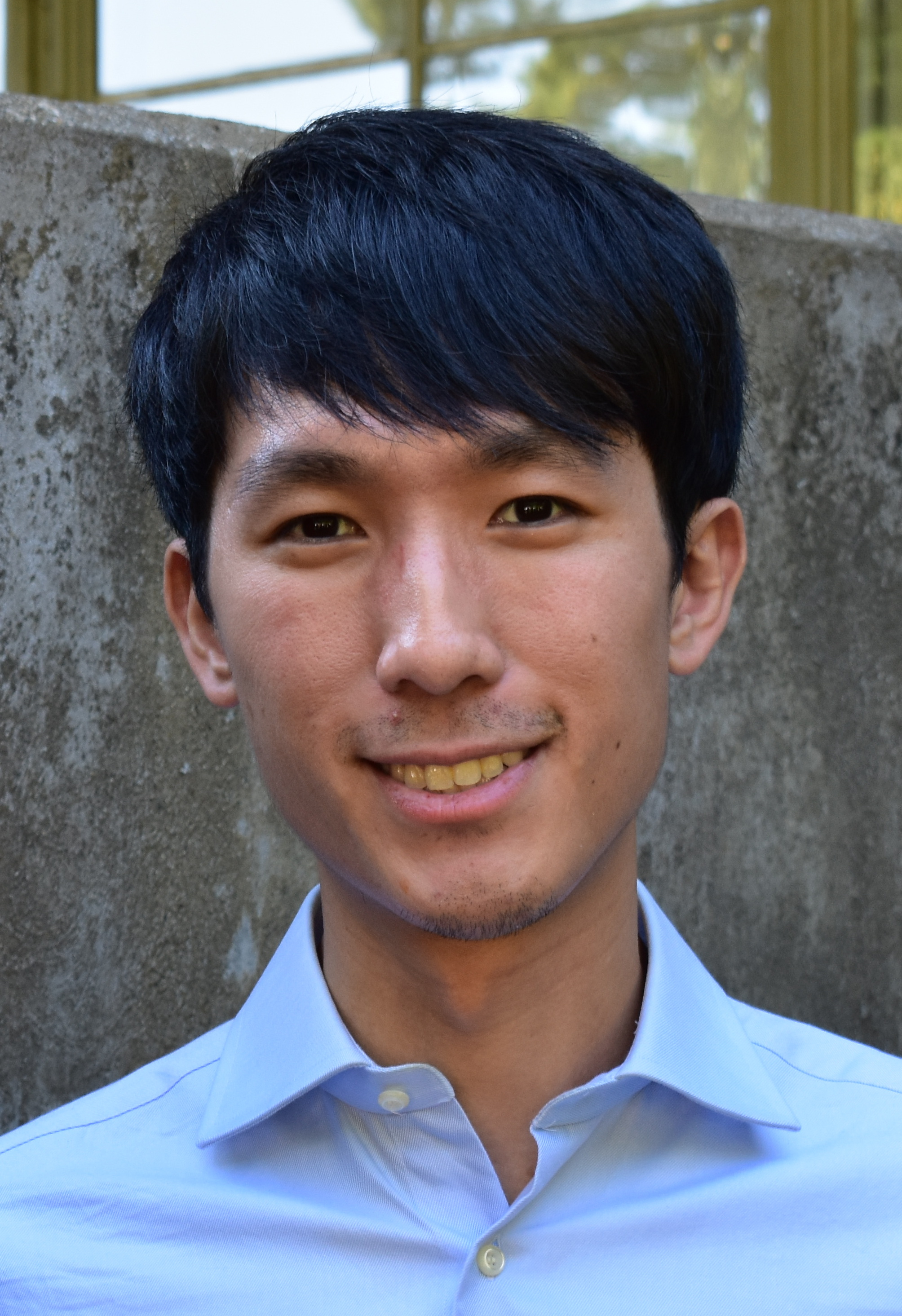
- Lu at Tanglewood in 2026
- Born: December 15, 1997 (age 28); Massachusetts, U.S.
- Occupation: Classical pianist
- Awards: (gold) First Prize, Leeds International Piano Competition (2018); (gold) First Prize, XIX International Chopin Piano Competition (2025)
- Musical career
- Genre: Classical
- Instrument: Piano
- Labels: Deutsche Grammophon; Warner Classics

Chinese name
- Traditional Chinese: 陸逸軒
- Simplified Chinese: 陆逸轩
Transcriptions
Standard Mandarin
- Hanyu Pinyin: Lù Yìxuān
- Bopomofo: ㄌㄨˋ ㄧˋ ㄒㄩㄢ
- Wade–Giles: Lu⁴ I⁴-hsüan¹
- Website: www.ericlupianist.com

Eric Lu (Chinese: 陆逸轩; pinyin: Lù Yìxuān; born December 15, 1997) is an American classical pianist. He is the winner of the XIX International Chopin Piano Competition (2025) in Warsaw, Poland, and the winner of the 19th Leeds International Piano Competition (2018) in Leeds, England. He is one of only two pianists, alongside Radu Lupu, to have won at least two of the four major international piano competitions. (Note: Excluding the Leeds and Chopin, the other two major international piano competitions include the Van Cliburn International Piano Competition and the International Tchaikovsky Competition.)

At age 17, Lu first achieved international recognition after placing fourth in the 2015 XVII International Chopin Piano Competition, where he became one of the youngest laureates in the history of the Chopin Competition. He then won the 19th Leeds International Piano Competition at age 20 as its youngest finalist, receiving first prize after his performance of Beethoven's Piano Concerto No. 4. In 2025, he returned to compete in the 19th Chopin Competition and won its first prize after performing the Polonaise-Fantaisie and Piano Concerto No. 2 in the final stage.

Lu has performed with many of the world's major orchestras, including the London Symphony Orchestra, Chicago Symphony Orchestra, Boston Symphony Orchestra, Royal Philharmonic Orchestra, Los Angeles Philharmonic, Royal Stockholm Philharmonic Orchestra, and Oslo Philharmonic. He began recording for Warner Classics in 2019 under an exclusive contract. He has released critically acclaimed recordings of Beethoven, Brahms, Chopin, Schubert, and Schumann on the label.

== Early life and education ==
Lu was born in Massachusetts on December 15, 1997, to a Taiwanese father from Kaohsiung, Taiwan, and a Chinese mother from Shanghai, China. His Chinese name is Lu Yixuan (traditional Chinese: 陸逸軒; simplified Chinese: 陆逸轩; pinyin: Lù Yìxuān). Both of his parents are computer engineers who had an interest in classical music. Lu recalled in 2022 that "no one was a musician in the family, but my dad loved classical music. We had lots of records in the house." His mother's Chinese surname is Xie (Chinese: 谢; pinyin: Xiè). After graduating from Fudan University, she became involved in software design.

Lu was raised in Bedford, Massachusetts. As an infant, he was briefly raised in Shanghai. He has an older sister, two years his senior, who also studied piano. He began playing the piano at age five, while under the tutelage of pianist Yang Jingchuan (Chinese: 杨镜川; pinyin: Yáng Jìngchuān) of the China National Symphony Orchestra. Through Yang, Lu was also tutored as a child by the Chinese pianist and composer Yin Chengzong. He remained under Yang until age 13.

As a teenager, Lu frequented the Boston Symphony Orchestra (BSO), recalling in 2023 that he went "at least once a month, sometimes more" before turning 15 years old. He graduated from the New England Conservatory Preparatory School in 2013. While there, he studied under classical pianists Alexander Korsantia and A. Ramón Rivera, in addition to studying outside of school as a pupil of Dang Thai Son. He then began attending the Curtis Institute of Music at 15 years old, studying under pianists Jonathan Biss and Robert McDonald. As a student at the Curtis Institute, he won the school's Charles Miller Prize for exceptional performance of the works of Sergei Rachmaninoff. He graduated with a specialization in piano in 2020.

== Career ==
=== Teenage pianist ===
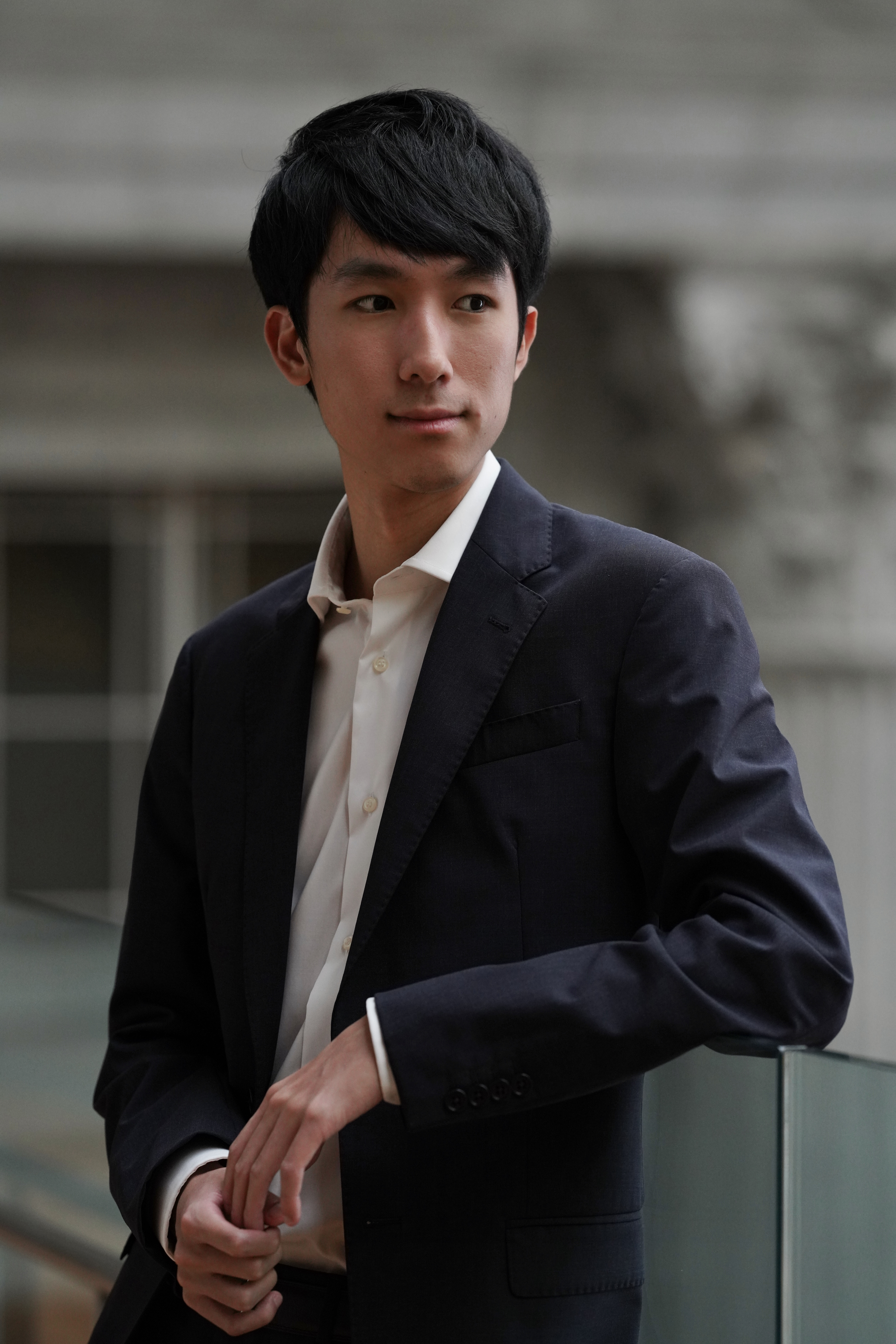
Lu in 2023

In 2010, Lu won the first prize in the 12th Ettlingen International Piano Competition in Ettlingen, Germany. In 2011, he was awarded a special prize chosen by the public at the 2011 Junior Academy Eppan in Italy. In 2012, he won the concerto competition at the Foundation for Chinese Performing Arts in Walnut Hill, Medford, Massachusetts.

In 2013, Lu won first prize at the Minnesota International e-Piano Junior Competition, where he also won its special Schubert Prize. In August 2014, Lu won first prize at the 9th Moscow International Chopin Competition for Young Pianists.

On March 1, 2015, Lu won first prize at the 9th National Chopin Piano Competition of the Chopin Foundation of the United States—held in Miami-Dade County, Florida—after performing Chopin's Piano Concerto No. 1 in its final round. He was the youngest of the 24 pianists participating. In addition to its cash award of $75,000, he also earned a national concert tour, received the competition's prize for the best concerto performance, and was guaranteed admission as a competitor at the incoming XVII International Chopin Piano Competition. On June 24, 2015, he made his New York debut recital at Carnegie Hall, performing Chopin, Bach, and Schumann. He then made his International Chopin Festival debut in Duszniki-Zdroj, Poland, performing Chopin's Preludes Op. 28 on August 11, 2015.

In October 2015, Lu entered the 18th International Chopin Piano Competition in Warsaw, Poland, becoming one of the youngest pianists in the competition. Of the 450 participating pianists, Lu was selected by the jury—headed by Katarzyna Popowa-Zydroń—as one of 10 finalists. On October 21, 2015, the results of the competition were announced, with Lu winning fourth prize and its prize sum of €15,000. At 17 years old, he was the youngest laureate of that year's competition, and one of the youngest laureates in the competition's history.

In May 2017, Lu won the International German Piano Award in Frankfurt, Germany, and also won its audience-choice prize.

=== Professional ===
External videos
- Eric Lu - Semi Finals - "The Leeds" Competition 2018 by Leeds International Piano Competition, September 2018
- The Leeds International Piano Competition Finals - Eric Lu, First Prize Winner by Leeds International Piano Competition, September 15, 2018

In September 2018, Lu won the 19th Leeds International Piano Competition, the first American pianist to do so since Murray Perahia in 1972. He placed first out of the competition's five finalists who each performed a concerto at the Leeds Town Hall with the Hallé Orchestra under conductor Edward Gardner; at 20 years old, Lu was the youngest of the competition's finalists. He secured first prize after performing Beethoven's Piano Concerto No. 4 in the final stage and also won an additional orchestral prize: the Hallé Orchestra Prize. Chinese pianist Lang Lang presented him the prize on September 19, 2018, along with its Dame Fanny Waterman Gold Medal. As the winner of the Leeds competition, Lu earned an album contract with Warner Classics, a prize sum of approximately $33,000, and incoming performances at Wigmore Hall and Southbank Centre with the Royal Liverpool Philharmonic Orchestra. He also received performance engagements with BBC Radio 3 and the Oslo Philharmonic Orchestra.

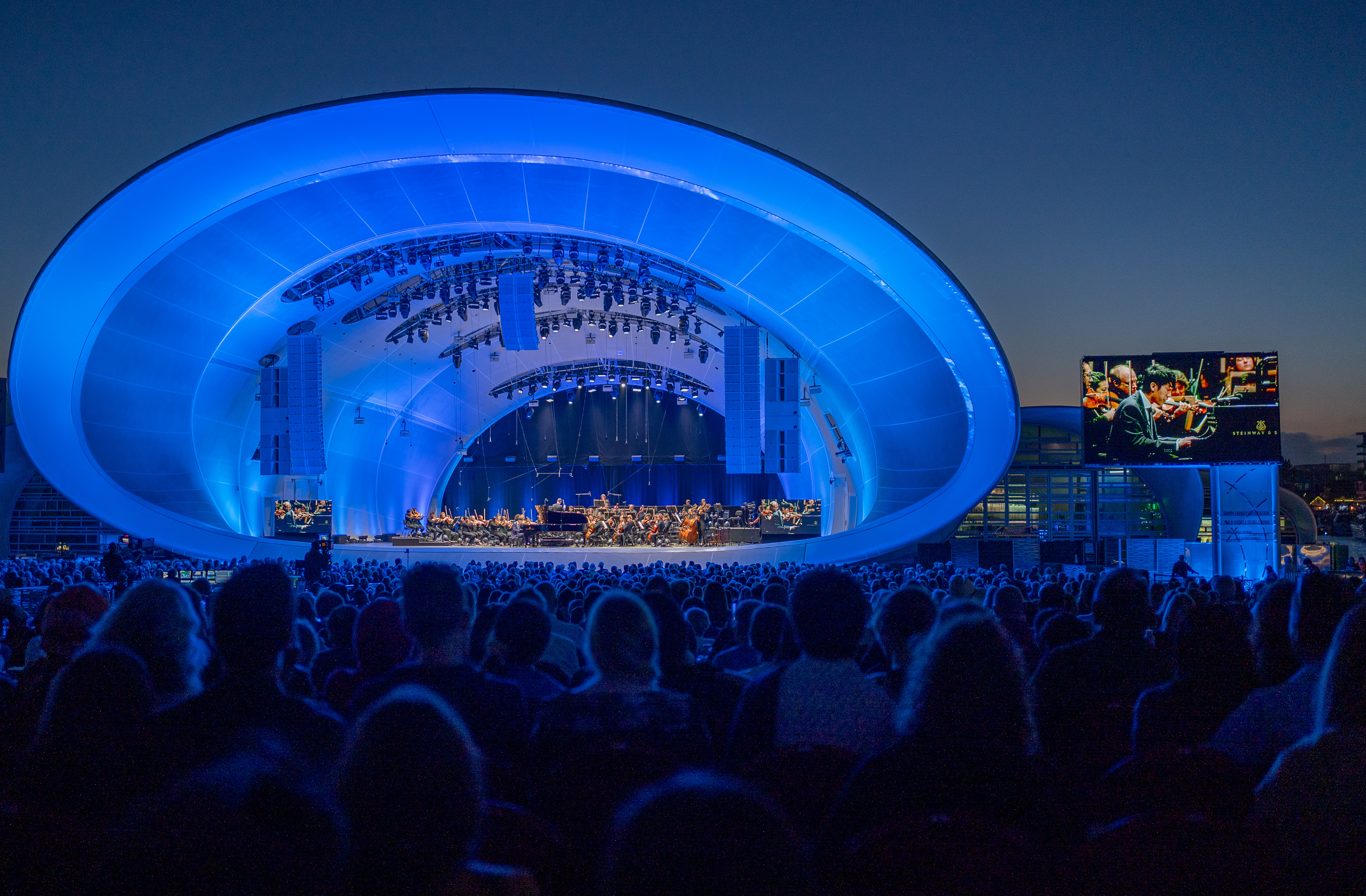
Lu performing at the Rady Shell at Jacobs Park in San Diego, California, in 2023

After winning the Leeds Competition, Lu began being mentored by pianists Mitsuko Uchida and Imogen Cooper. His first recital in the United Kingdom after winning was held at St George's Church, Brandon Hill, in November 2018, in which he performed Schubert's Impromptus, Op. 90; Chopin's Ballade No. 4; and Mozart's Rondo in A minor. The Guardian wrote of his Bristol recital that "his performance showed the kind of grace and wisdom that usually comes only with great age" and that "Lu seems already to possess something of the magic touch of early Leeds laureates Murray Perahia and Radu Lupu."

In June 2019, Lu substituted for Martha Argerich in a concert with the Singapore Symphony Orchestra, after Argerich experienced health issues. He made his BBC Proms debut that same year at London's Royal Albert Hall with the Shanghai Symphony Orchestra under conductor Yu Long, performing Mozart's Piano Concerto No. 23. On April 26, 2021, he performed Mozart's Piano Sonata No. 13 in B major, K.333; Schubert's Piano Sonata in A minor, D 784; and Chopin's Andante spianato et grande polonaise brillante at Wigmore Hall. The journalist Jay Nordlinger, writing in The New Criterion, described Lu's performance during the recital as having "dearness and lyricism."

On October 6, 2022, Lu made his Chicago Symphony Orchestra (CSO) debut under Italian conductor Riccardo Muti at the Chicago Symphony Center, substituting for pianist Maurizio Pollini. He performed Mozart's Piano Concerto No. 27. In a review of the concert, the Chicago Tribune noted Lu's "perfectly idiomatic" interpretation of Mozart and his "pliant, gossamer touch, favoring watercolor strokes over geometric blueprints."

External videos
- ERIC LU – first round (19th Chopin Competition, Warsaw) by Chopin Institute, October 6, 2025
- ERIC LU – second round (19th Chopin Competition, Warsaw) by Chopin Institute, October 11, 2025
- ERIC LU – third round (19th Chopin Competition, Warsaw) by Chopin Institute, October 16, 2025

In 2024, Lu made the decision to return to the Chopin Competition to compete for a second time. He entered the 19th International Chopin Piano Competition—set for the following year in Warsaw, Poland—despite the risk of reputational damage if he did not win first place, as he was already an established pianist. The competition began on October 3, 2025, and concluded on October 23. Of the 642 pianists applying, Lu was one of the 171 who qualified for the preliminaries and one of the 84 chosen to officially compete. He was ultimately one of only 11 pianists who qualified for the final round. Just before his scheduled final round, Lu injured a finger and became ill with the common cold, such that his final was rescheduled from October 15 to October 16. His final performance was of Chopin's Piano Concerto No. 2 and Polonaise-Fantaisie, accompanied by the Warsaw Philharmonic Orchestra under conductor Andrey Boreyko.

On October 21, 2025, the Chopin Competition's 17-member international jury announced Lu as the winner. He was awarded the competition's gold medal and the prize sum of €60,000 (approx. US$69,000). The concluding awards ceremony was held that same day at the Grand Theatre, Warsaw, where Polish president Karol Nawrocki presented Lu the gold medal, with first lady Marta Nawrocka, Polish officials Szymon Hołownia and Radosław Sikorski, and other ministers in attendance. Lu became the second American to win the competition, after Garrick Ohlsson in 1970, and the second winner to play Piano Concerto No. 2, after his former teacher Dang Thai Son in 1980. (Note: Dang Thai Son was also a member of the jury of the 19th Chopin Competition. Because Lu was a former pupil, Son recused himself from the jury deliberations.) He is also the only person to have taken part in the competition twice and won a prize both times. An album of his winning performances were released by Deutsche Grammophon on November 21, 2025.

== Personal life ==
Lu is based in Boston, Massachusetts, and Berlin, Germany. He has a close friendship with Singaporean pianist Kate Liu, a former classmate with whom he performed a duo recital in October 2024 at the Victoria Theatre and Concert Hall in Singapore.

== Discography ==
Lu records for Warner Classics under an exclusive contract. His first major release was in 2020, of an album of Chopin's 24 Preludes, Op. 28; Schumann's Geistervariationen; and Brahms's Intermezzo, Op. 117 No. 1. Lu followed this with an all-Schubert disc, released in 2022. In January 2026, he released an album of Schubert's Impromptus; in a review, The Guardian remarked that "Perhaps these performances aren’t yet quite distinctive enough to make this recording top choice in a crowded field, but they certainly back up the Chopin judges’ decision: Lu is a serious talent."

Release	Album details	Record label	Ref.
June 2018	Eric Lu: Late works by Mozart, Schubert, and Brahms: Rondo in A minor by Mozart; Impromptus, Op. 90 by Schubert; Six Pieces for Piano, Op. 118 by Brahms	Genuin	
November 2018	Beethoven: Piano Concerto No. 4, Chopin: Piano Sonata No. 2, Ballade No. 4: Piano Concerto No. 4 by Beethoven; Piano Sonata No. 2 by Chopin; Ballade No. 4 by Chopin	Warner Classics	
February 2020	Chopin, Brahms, Schumann: 24 Preludes, Op. 28 by Chopin; Intermezzo No. 1 in E-flat major by Brahms; Geistervariationen by Schumann	Warner Classics	
December 2022	Schubert: Piano Sonatas D.784 & D.959 – Allegretto D.915: Piano Sonata No. 20 in A major, D. 959 by Schubert; Piano Sonata No. 14 in A minor, D. 784 by Schubert	Warner Classics	
May 2025	Schubert: Impromptus: Impromptus by Schubert	Warner Classics	
November 2025	Eric Lu: Winner of the 19th International Fryderyk Chopin Piano Competition Warsaw 2025 Complete collection of all performances in the XIX International Chopin Competition	Deutsche Grammophon	

== Accolades ==
Competition	Year	Award	Location	Result	Ref.
XII Ettlingen International Competition for Young Pianists	2010	(gold) First Prize	Ettlingen, Germany	Won	
III Minnesota International e-Piano Junior Competition	2013	(gold) First Prize and Schubert Prize	Minneapolis–Saint Paul, Minnesota, U.S.	Won	
IX Moscow International Fryderyk Chopin Competition for Young Pianists	2014	(gold) First Prize	Moscow, Russia	Won	
IX US National Chopin Competition	2015	(gold) First Prize and Prize for Best Performance of a Concerto	Miami, Florida, U.S.	Won	
XVII International Chopin Piano Competition	2015	Fourth Prize	Warsaw, Poland	—N/a	
VII International German Piano Award	2017	(gold) First Prize and FAZ Audience Award	Frankfurt, Germany	Won	
19th Leeds International Piano Competition	2018	(gold) First Prize and Terence Judd–Hallé Orchestra Prize	Leeds, England	Won	
XIX International Chopin Piano Competition	2025	(gold) First Prize	Warsaw, Poland	Won	
