= International Chopin Piano Competition =

Polish classical music piano award

International Fryderyk Chopin Piano Competition
- Current: XIX International Chopin Piano Competition
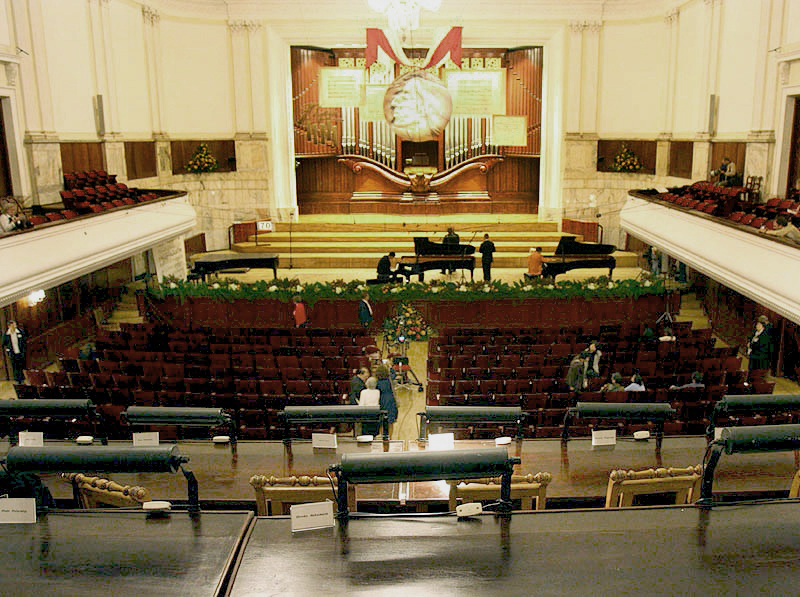
- The National Philharmonic during the 2005 competition
- Venue: National Philharmonic, Warsaw, Poland
- Presented by: Fryderyk Chopin Institute
- First award: 1927; 99 years ago
- Website: konkursy.nifc.pl/en

The International Chopin Piano Competition (Polish: Międzynarodowy Konkurs Pianistyczny im. Fryderyka Chopina), also known as the Chopin Competition, is a piano competition in Warsaw, Poland, held first in 1927 and every five years since 1955. The competition is one of the founding members of the World Federation of International Music Competitions. It is entirely dedicated to the works of Frédéric Chopin, and is one of the few competitions dedicated entirely to the works of a single composer. It is organized by the Fryderyk Chopin Institute.

Described as the "Olympics of the piano world" by The New York Times, the Chopin Competition is considered one of the most prestigious competitions in classical music, known for launching pianists' international careers. Past winners have included Maurizio Pollini (1960), Martha Argerich (1965), Krystian Zimerman (1975), Yundi Li (2000), Rafał Blechacz (2005), and Seong-Jin Cho (2015). The most recent winner is American pianist Eric Lu, who won the XIX competition in 2025. Chinese pianist Yundi Li is the youngest winner and the youngest juror in the competition's history.

== History ==
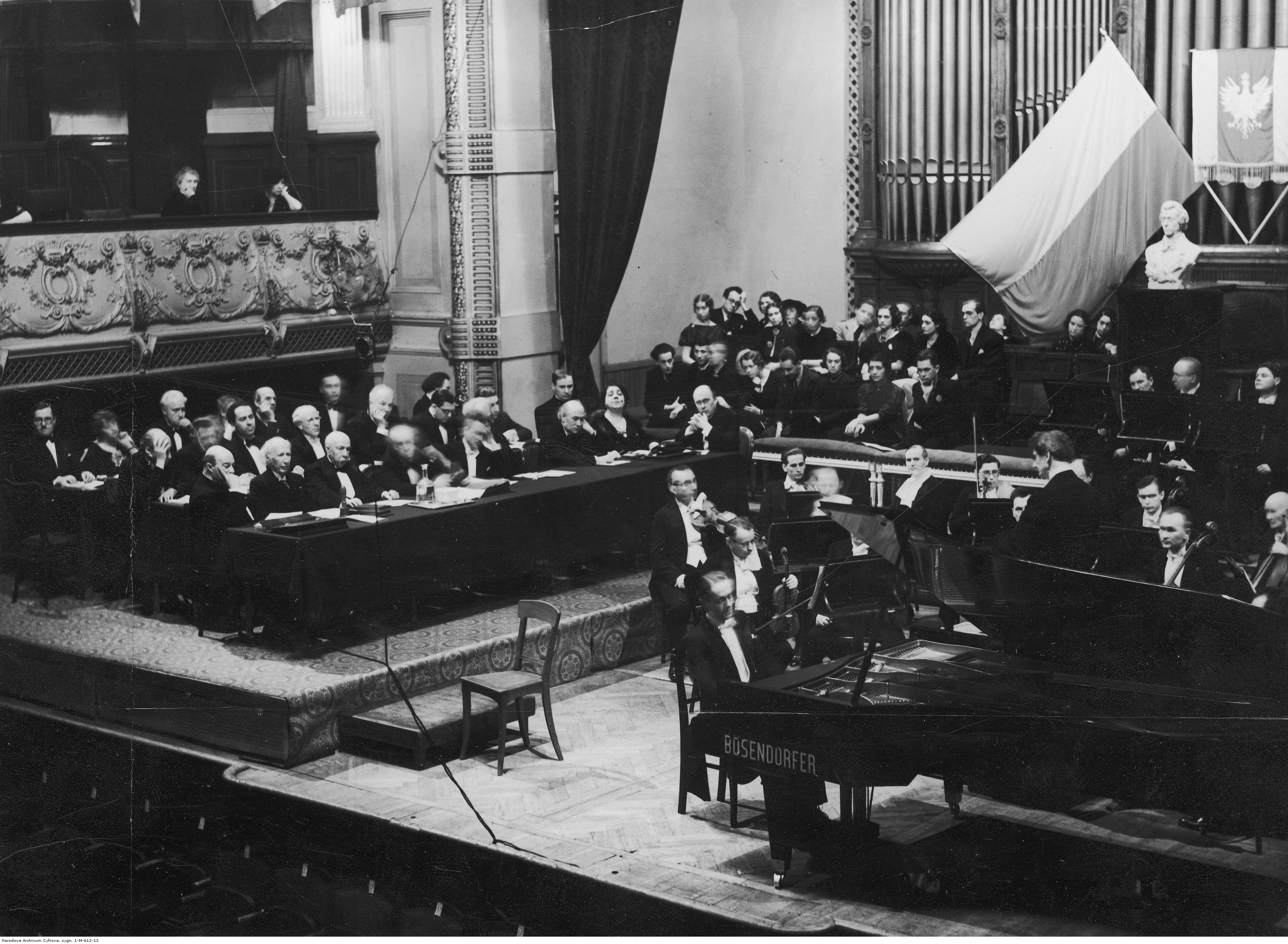
3rd Chopin Competition (1937). Among members of the jury (sitting on the left) Heinrich Neuhaus, Emil von Sauer, Guido Agosti, and Wilhelm Backhaus

The competition was initiated by Polish pianist and pedagogue Jerzy Żurawlew, who began seeking funds for a piano competition in 1925, influenced by Aleksander Michałowski. Żurawlew recalled later: "Young people at that time, not long after the end of the Great War, were taking a keen interest in sports. They were dyed-in-the-wool realists in their outlook on life. I would often hear that Chopin was excessively romantic, that he enervated the soul and weakened the psyche. Some went so far as to discourage the inclusion of Chopin as required repertoire in music schools. All that showed a fundamental lack of understanding, which I found very painful ... As I watched young people's enthusiasm for sporting achievement, I finally hit upon a solution: a competition! Here was a format to bring tangible advantages to young performers of Chopin in the form of monetary prizes and an international performing career."

Gathering funds for the competition proved to be a difficult task. As Żurawlew remembered later: "I met with utter incomprehension, indifference and even aversion. The opinion among musicians was unanimous: Chopin is so great that he can defend himself. At the Ministry, it was announced that there were no funds for it [...] and that the whole idea was unfeasible". In this difficult situation, help arrived from Henryk Rewkiewicz—a businessman, music lover, and board member of The Warsaw Music Society, who personally guaranteed to cover the entire deficit expected to arise from the first Competition.

Many years later Jerzy Żurawlew wrote, "I was greatly helped by my friend Henryk Rewkiewicz, director of the Match Monopoly, who offered 15,000 złoty—a substantial sum at the time—for the Competition". Ultimately, things picked up with the election of Polish president Ignacy Mościcki, who became the Chopin Competition's patron.

Subsequent editions were organized in 1932 and 1937; the postwar fourth and fifth editions were held in 1949 and 1955. In 1957 the competition became one of the founding members of the World Federation of International Music Competitions in Geneva. The prewar editions of the competition as well as three editions after World War II (1955, 1960, 1965) were held in winter, close to Chopin's birthdate, 22 February. But because jurors and competitors often fell ill in this period, the organizers moved the competition to October, the month in which Chopin died.

The 1980 edition was marked by controversy over the elimination of Ivo Pogorelić, who was seen as one of the favourites, in the third round. This prompted juror Martha Argerich to resign in protest, calling Pogorelić a "genius". Her action was supported by two other jurors, who called it "unthinkable that such an artist should not make it to the finals". Other judges spoke out about their disapproval of what they considered Pogorelić's eccentricities. After Stanislav Bunin won in 1985, the jury withheld first prize in both 1990 and 1995. First prize was not awarded again until Yundi Li won in 2000.

Traditionally, on 17 October—the day of Chopin's death—a solemn mass is celebrated at the Holy Cross Church in Warsaw, during which Wolfgang Amadeus Mozart's Requiem is performed in accordance with Chopin's wishes. In 2018, the Chopin Institute organized the inaugural I International Chopin Competition on Period Instruments. The XVIII International Chopin Piano Competition, originally scheduled for 2020, was postponed to 2021 due to the COVID-19 pandemic.

== Jury ==
The jury has been chaired by:

- Witold Maliszewski (1927)
- Adam Wieniawski (1932 and 1937)
- Zbigniew Drzewiecki (1949, 1955, 1960, 1965)
- Kazimierz Sikorski (1970 and 1975)
- Kazimierz Kord (1980)
- Jan Ekier (1985, 1990, 1995)
- Andrzej Jasiński (2000, 2005, 2010)
- Katarzyna Popowa-Zydroń (2015, 2021)
- Garrick Ohlsson (2025)

== Prize winners ==
The laureates of the Chopin International Piano Competition:

Top 3 prize-winners at each Edition
Edition	1st	2nd	3rd
I (1927)	Lev Oborin; Soviet Union	Stanisław Szpinalski; Poland	Róża Etkin; Poland
II (1932)	Alexander Uninsky (c); Soviet Union	Imre Ungár (c); Hungary	Bolesław Kon; Poland
III (1937)	Yakov Zak; Soviet Union	Rosa Tamarkina; Soviet Union	Witold Małcużyński; Poland
IV (1949)	Bella Davidovich; Soviet Union	Barbara Hesse-Bukowska; Poland	Waldemar Maciszewski; Poland
IV (1949)	Halina Czerny-Stefańska; Poland (tie)	Barbara Hesse-Bukowska; Poland	Waldemar Maciszewski; Poland
V (1955)	Adam Harasiewicz; Poland	Vladimir Ashkenazy; Soviet Union	Fou Ts'ong; China
VI (1960)	Maurizio Pollini; Italy	Irina Zaritskaya; Soviet Union	Tania Achot-Haroutounian; Iran
VII (1965)	Martha Argerich; Argentina	Arthur Moreira Lima; Brazil	Marta Sosińska; Poland
VIII (1970)	Garrick Ohlsson; United States	Mitsuko Uchida; Japan	Piotr Paleczny; Poland
IX (1975)	Krystian Zimerman; Poland	Dina Joffe; Soviet Union	Tatyana Fedkina; Soviet Union
X (1980)	Dang Thai Son; Vietnam	Tatyana Shebanova; Soviet Union	Arutyun Papazyan; Soviet Union
XI (1985)	Stanislav Bunin; Soviet Union	Marc Laforet; France	Krzysztof Jabłoński; Poland
XII (1990)	Not awarded	Kevin Kenner; United States	Yukio Yokoyama; Japan
XIII (1995)	Not awarded	Philippe Giusiano; France	Gabriela Montero; Venezuela
XIII (1995)	Not awarded	Alexei Sultanov; Uzbekistan (tie)	Gabriela Montero; Venezuela
XIV (2000)	Yundi Li; China	Ingrid Fliter; Argentina	Alexander Kobrin; Russia
XV (2005)	Rafał Blechacz; Poland	Not awarded	Dong-Hyek Lim; South Korea
XV (2005)	Rafał Blechacz; Poland	Not awarded	Dong-Min Lim; South Korea (tie)
XVI (2010)	Yulianna Avdeeva; Russia	Lukas Geniušas; Russia Lithuania	Daniil Trifonov; Russia
XVI (2010)	Yulianna Avdeeva; Russia	Ingolf Wunder; Austria (tie)	Daniil Trifonov; Russia
XVII (2015)	Seong-Jin Cho; South Korea	Charles Richard-Hamelin; Canada	Kate Liu; United States
XVIII (2021)	Bruce Liu; Canada	Kyohei Sorita; Japan	Martín García García; Spain
XVIII (2021)	Bruce Liu; Canada	Alexander Gadjiev; Italy Slovenia (tie)	Martín García García; Spain
XIX (2025)	Eric Lu; United States	Kevin Chen; Canada	Zitong Wang; China

Traditional special awards at the competition include the Polish Radio prize for the best mazurka performance (since 1927), the Fryderyk Chopin Society in Warsaw prize for the best polonaise (since 1960), and the National Philharmonic prize for the best performance of a piano concerto (since 1980).

=== Medal table ===
Chopin Competition Medal Table
Rank	Nation	Gold	Silver	Bronze	Total
1	Soviet Union	5	5	2	12
2	Poland	4	2	7	13
3	United States	2	1	1	4
4	Canada	1	2	0	3
5	Russia	1	1	2	4
6	Argentina	1	1	0	2
6	Italy	1	1	0	2
8	China	1	0	2	3
8	South Korea	1	0	2	3
10	Vietnam	1	0	0	1
11	Japan	0	2	1	3
12	France	0	2	0	2
13	Austria	0	1	0	1
13	Brazil	0	1	0	1
13	Hungary	0	1	0	1
13	Lithuania	0	1	0	1
13	Slovenia	0	1	0	1
13	Uzbekistan	0	1	0	1
19	Iran	0	0	1	1
19	Spain	0	0	1	1
19	Venezuela	0	0	1	1
Totals (21 entries)		18	23	20	61

Note: Medals were only awarded after 1975. In this table, winner of the 1st, 2nd and 3rd Prize prior to 1975 are included as having won Gold, Silver, and Bronze respectively.

== In popular culture ==
The Chopin Competition is a major plot device in the Japanese manga series Forest of Piano, serialized from 1998 to 2015 and adapted as an anime from 2018 to 2019. It follows the story of Kai Ichinose, who ultimately wins the Chopin Competition. Creator Makoto Isshiki was inspired to write the series when she watched a documentary showing Stanislav Bunin winning the XI International Chopin Piano Competition. The 2023 documentary film Pianoforte, directed by Jakub Piątek, depicts the competition through exclusive behind-the-scenes footage and premiered at the Sundance Film Festival.

== See also ==
- List of classical music competitions
