= Philippe Entremont =

French pianist and conductor (born 1934)

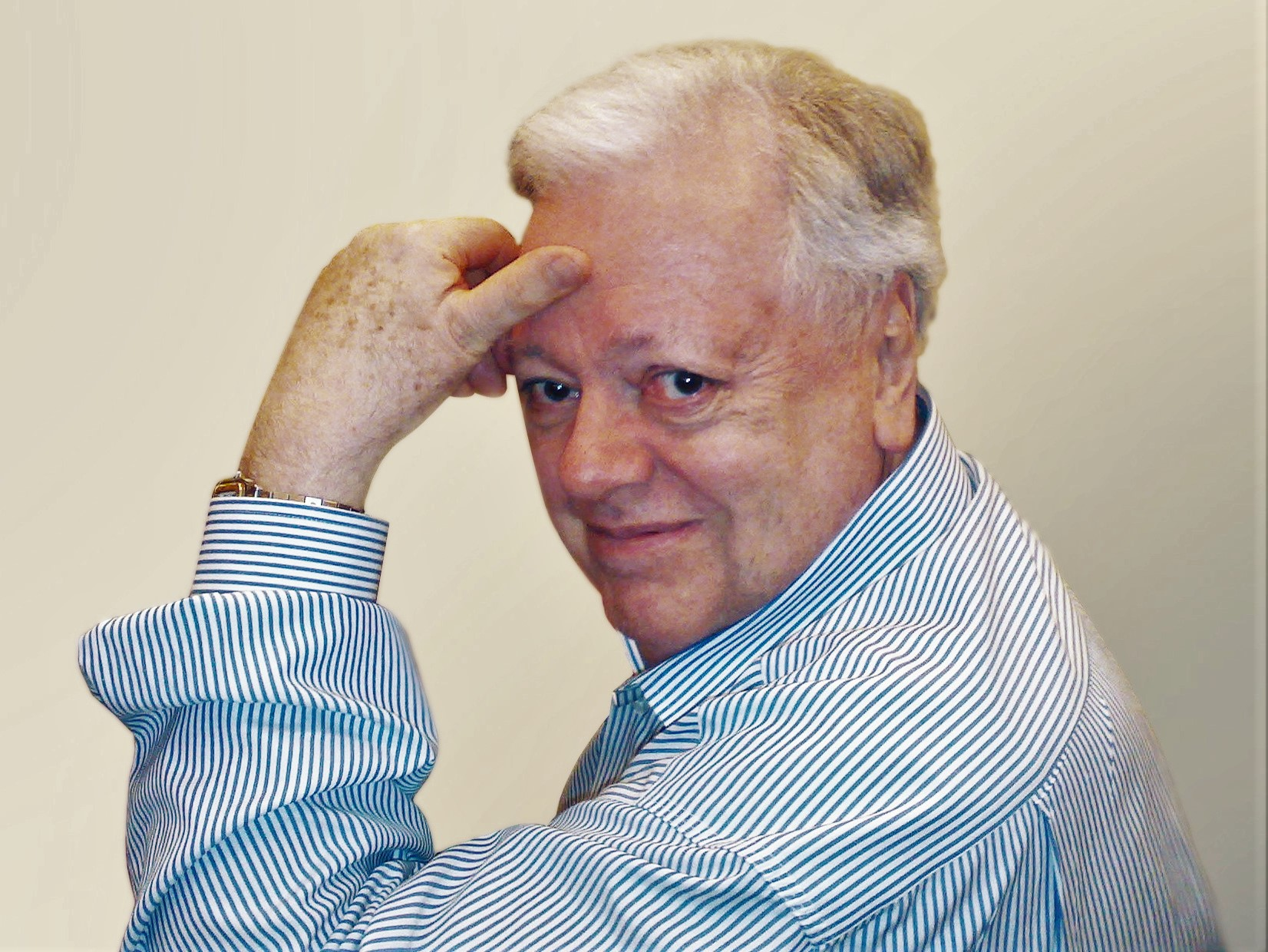
- Philippe Entremont (2008)
- Born: 7 June 1934 (age 92); Reims, France
- Occupations: classical pianist, conductor
- Known for: founder, Santo Domingo Music Festival

Philippe Entremont (born 7 June 1934) is a French classical pianist and conductor. His recordings as a pianist include concertos by Tchaikovsky, Maurice Ravel, Rachmaninoff, Saint-Saëns and others.

== Early life ==
Philippe Entremont was born in Reims to musical parents, his mother being a Grand Prix pianist and his father an operatic conductor. Philippe first received piano lessons from his mother at the age of six. His father introduced him to the world of chamber and orchestral music.

He studied in Paris with Marguerite Long, and entered the Conservatoire de Paris. He won prizes in sight-reading at age 12, chamber-music at age 14, and piano at 15. He became Laureat at the international Long-Thibaud Competition at the age of 16.

== Career ==
He won a prize in the 1952 Queen Elisabeth Music Competition and then began his career of serious concert-giving at the piano.

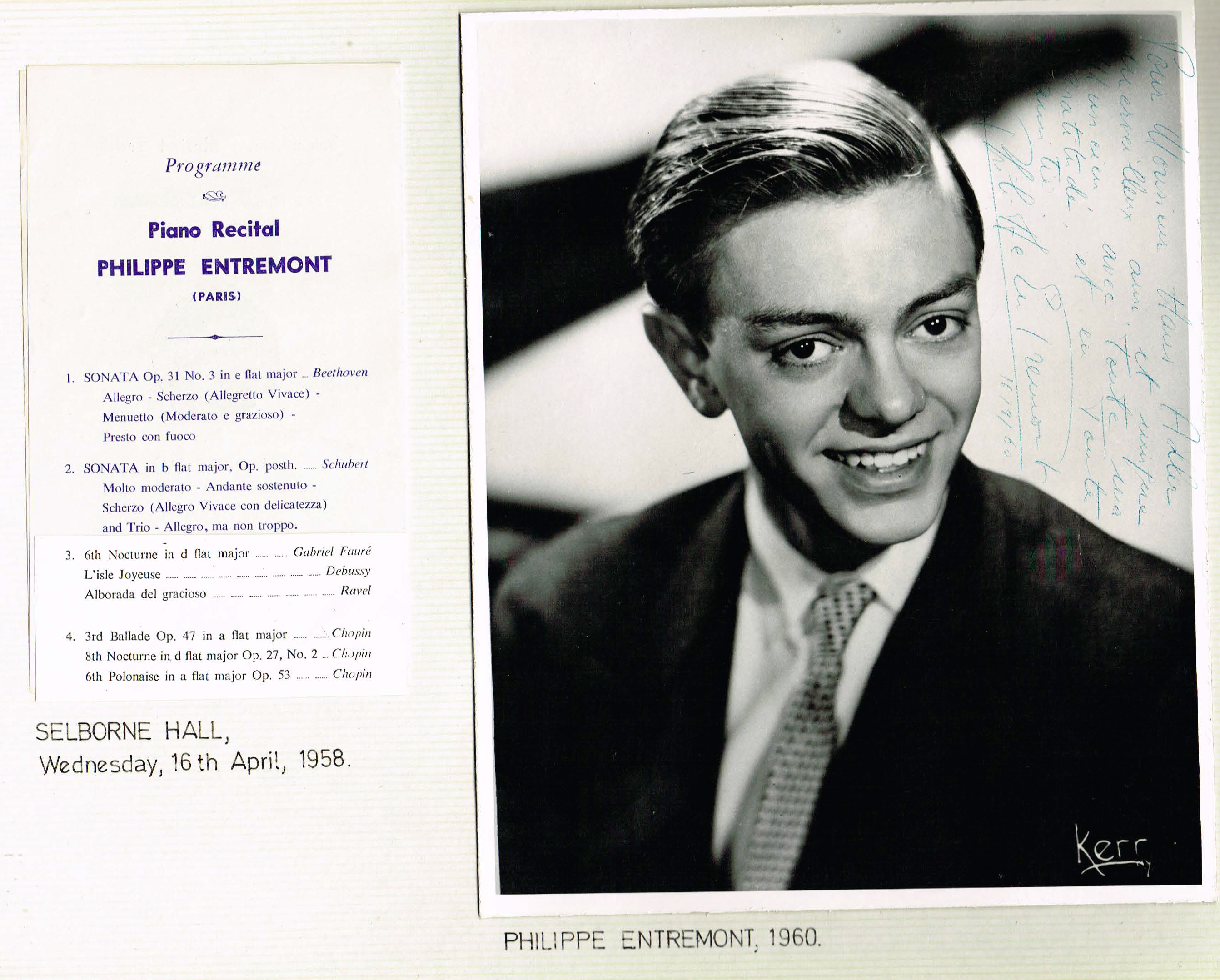
Philippe Entremont, 1958 photo dedicated on first of three acclaimed musical tours of Southern Africa organised by Hans Adler

Within five years he was hailed as a new and major voice in European pianism. He earned further recognition through tours of South America and the United States; organized by the National Music League and the Jeunesses Musicales International in 1953 and 1955. Eugene Ormandy auditioned him in 1954 and at once engaged him for his Philadelphia Orchestra debut, which took place in November 1956. His early Columbia recordings with Ormandy (c.1957–58), released in Europe by Philips Records (e.g. Rachmaninoff's Rhapsody on a Theme of Paganini) preserve the mood of exhilaration which attended his European debuts. His recording of Rachmaninoff's Second Concerto with Leonard Bernstein on Columbia was considered an extraordinary reading at the time. He also recorded Tchaikovsky's Piano Concerto No. 1, with the same forces.

He recorded Rachmaninoff's First and Fourth Concertos with Ormandy and the Philadelphia Orchestra. The Concertos Nos. 2 and 4 of Saint-Saëns with Ormandy are noteworthy as well. Entremont made a debut as both pianist and conductor (directing from the keyboard) in 1968 on a Columbia records release in which he played Mozart's Piano Concertos Nos. 13 and 17 and conducted the Collegium Musicum of Paris. He has also recorded many of Friedrich Kuhlau's songs.

Entremont was Director of the New Orleans Symphony from 1980 to 1986. He served the Denver Symphony Orchestra as principal conductor from 1986 to 1988, and music director from 1988 to 1989. Entremont has also been chief conductor of the Vienna Chamber Orchestra, and is now its Conductor Laureate. He also holds the same title with the Israel Chamber Orchestra.

He served on the jury of the Paloma O'Shea Santander International Piano Competition in 1990, 1995 and 2005. In 2010 and 2015, he was a juror at the International Chopin Piano Competition. He caused controversy at the XVII Chopin Competition when he gave Seong-Jin Cho, the winner of the competition, a score of just 1 in the final, the lowest possible score. This was a substantial deviation from the other jurors; 14 of the 17 jurors gave Cho 9 or more points, leading to speculation that Entremont had trouble with Cho's teacher Michel Béroff.

Entremont founded the Biennial Santo Domingo Music Festival in 1997. Since 2002 he has been Principal Guest Conductor of China's Shanghai Broadcasting Symphony Orchestra.

During the 2005–2006 Season, Entremont led the Munich Symphony Orchestra as both conductor and pianist for the orchestra's U.S. debut tour. In September 2007, Entremont returned to New Orleans as a soloist to open the Louisiana Philharmonic Orchestra's second post-Katrina season with Ravel's Piano Concerto in G major.

Preceded by Carlo Zecchi	Chief Conductor, Vienna Chamber Orchestra; 1976–1991	Succeeded by Ernst Kovacic
