= XVII International Chopin Piano Competition =

Piano competition (2015)

The Seventeenth International Fryderyk Chopin Piano Competition
- Official poster
- Date: April 13–24, 2015 (preliminary round); October 1–23, 2015 (main stage)
- Venue: National Philharmonic, Warsaw
- Hosted by: Fryderyk Chopin Institute
- Winner: (South Korea) Seong-Jin Cho
- Website: www.chopincompetition2015.com

The XVII International Chopin Piano Competition (Polish: XVII Międzynarodowy Konkurs Pianistyczny im. Fryderyka Chopina) was held in Warsaw on April 13–24, 2015 (preliminary round) and October 1–23, 2015 (main competition and concerts). Prize winners' concerts were on October 21–23, 2015.

Seong-Jin Cho of South Korea won the competition.

== Awards ==
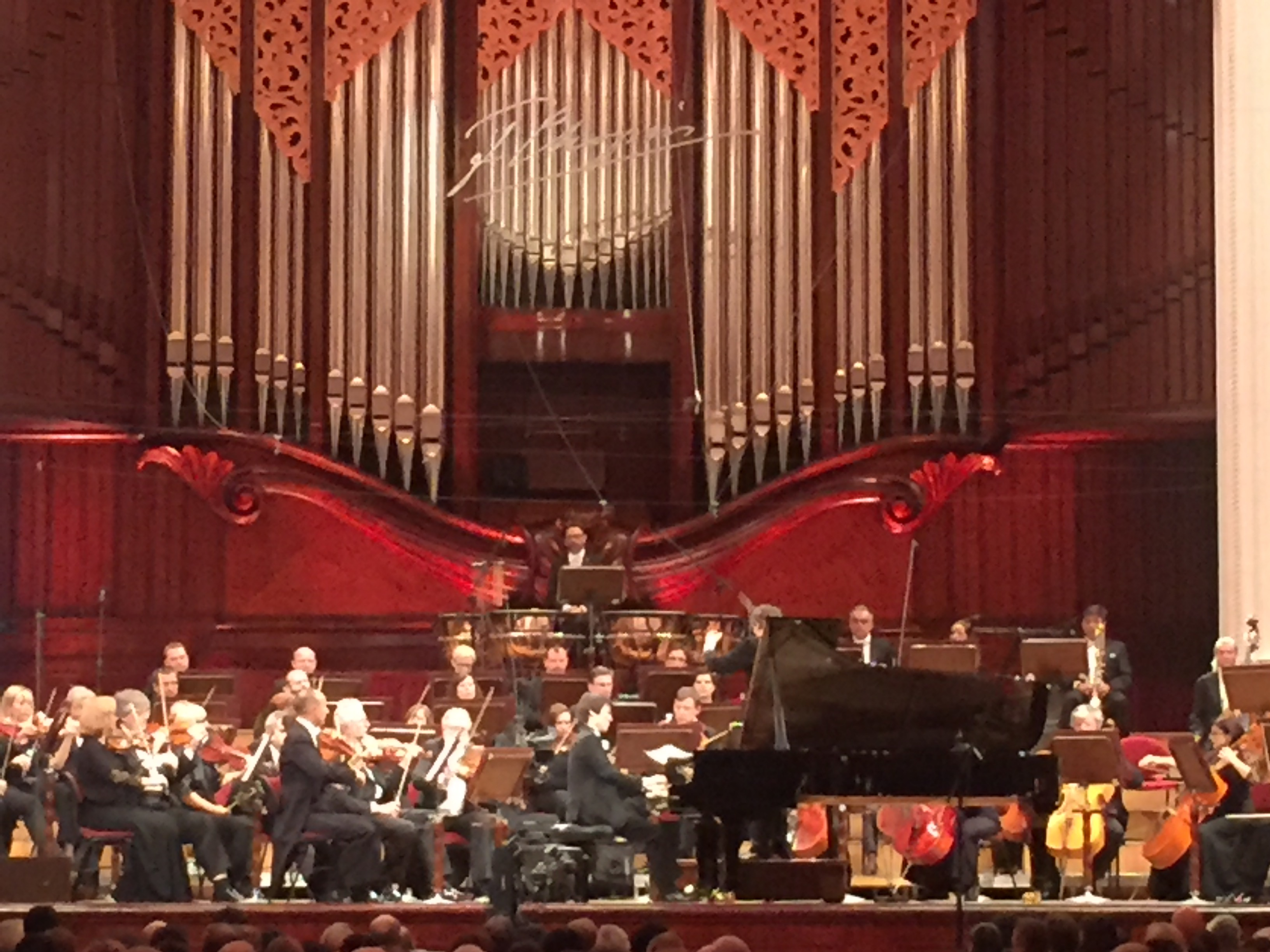
The finals

Seong-Jin Cho won the competition, playing the Piano Concerto in E minor, Opus 11 in the final. The prize money was €30,000. In addition, he also won the €3,000 prize for best polonaise, playing the Polonaise in A flat major, Opus 53 in the second stage.

Charles Richard-Hamelin of Canada came second, Kate Liu of the United States came third, Eric Lu of the United States came fourth, Tony Yike Yang of Canada came fifth, and Dmitry Shishkin of Russia was placed sixth. The following prizes were awarded:

Prize		Winner	
1st place, gold medalist(s)	€30,000	Seong-Jin Cho	South Korea
2nd place, silver medalist(s)	€25,000	Charles Richard-Hamelin	Canada
3rd place, bronze medalist(s)	€20,000	Kate Liu	United States
4th	€15,000	Eric Lu	United States
5th	€10,000	Tony Yike Yang	Canada
6th	€7,000	Dmitry Shishkin	Russia
F	€4,000	Aljoša Jurinić	Croatia
F	€4,000	Aimi Kobayashi	Japan
F	€4,000	Szymon Nehring	Poland
F	€4,000	Georgijs Osokins	Latvia

In addition, four special prizes were awarded independently:

Special prize	Winner	
Best Performance of a Concerto	not awarded	
Best Performance of Mazurkas	Kate Liu	United States
Best Performance of a Polonaise	Seong-Jin Cho	South Korea
Best Performance of a Sonata	Charles Richard-Hamelin	Canada

== Jury ==
The juries consisted of:

=== Preliminary round jury ===
- (Bulgaria) Ludmil Angelov
- (Japan) Akiko Ebi (5th X)
- (Poland) Adam Harasiewicz ( (gold) V)
- (France) Yves Henry
- (Poland) Andrzej Jasiński
- (Czech Republic) Ivan Klánský
- (Uzbekistan) Anna Malikova
- (Italy) Alberto Nosè
- (Poland) Piotr Paleczny (3rd VIII)
- (Poland) Ewa Pobłocka (5th X)
- (Poland) Katarzyna Popowa-Zydroń (chairwoman); (HM IX)
- (Poland) Marta Sosińska-Janczewska
- (Poland) Wojciech Świtała
- (Latvia) Dina Joffe ( (silver) IX)

=== Competition jury ===
- (Russia) Dmitri Alexeev
- (Argentina) Martha Argerich ( (gold) VII)
- (Japan) Akiko Ebi (5th X)
- (Vietnam) (Canada) Đặng Thái Sơn ( (gold) X)
- (France) Philippe Entremont
- (Argentina) Nelson Goerner
- (Poland) Adam Harasiewicz ( (gold) V)
- (Poland) Andrzej Jasiński
- (China) Li Yundi ( (gold) XIV)
- (United States) Garrick Ohlsson ( (gold) VIII)
- (Poland) Janusz Olejniczak (6th VIII)
- (Poland) Piotr Paleczny (3rd VIII)
- (Poland) Ewa Pobłocka (5th X)
- (Poland) Katarzyna Popowa-Zydroń (chairwoman); (HM IX)
- (United States) John Rink
- (Poland) Wojciech Świtała
- (Latvia) Dina Joffe ( (silver) IX)

Philippe Entremont caused controversy when he gave Seong-Jin Cho, the winner of the competition, a score of just 1 in the final, the lowest possible score. This was a substantial deviation from the other jurors; 14 of the 17 jurors gave Cho 9 or more points, leading to speculation that Entremont had trouble with Cho's teacher Michel Béroff. A popular conjecture that Entremont may have been racially motivated could not be proven by statistical analysis.

== Competitor results ==
Yes: percentage of jurors who voted to pass the participant to the next round (excluding recusals)

Pts: average number of points (excluding recusals)

Competitor	Prelim.	Stage I			Stage II			Stage III			Final	
Competitor	R	Yes	Pts	R	Yes	Pts	R	Yes	Pts	R	Pts	R
(South Korea) Mihyun Ahn	No											
(South Korea) Jong Do An	No											
(China) Yu An	No											
(South Korea) Soo Jung Ann	Yes	78.6%	19.00	Yes	33.3%	17.76	No					
(Japan) Miyako Arishima	Yes	69.2%	18.47	Yes	7.1%	15.75	No					
(Mongolia) Bat-Erdene Batbileg	No											
(United Kingdom) Otis William Beasley	No											
(Poland) Tymoteusz Bies	Yes	53.3%	17.76	No								
(Poland) Rafał Błaszczyk	Yes	14.3%	16.38	No								
(Poland) Łukasz Piotr Byrdy	Yes	73.3%	18.53	Yes	35.7%	17.50	No					
(Italy) Michelle Candotti	Yes	80.0%	19.41	Yes	7.1%	16.75	No					
(Italy) Luigi Carroccia	Yes	93.3%	20.24	Yes	78.6%	20.06	Yes	13.3%	18.18	No		
(Taiwan) Hsin-Jo Chan	No											
(China) Haoguo Chen	No											
(China) Xuehong Chen	No											
(Russia) Galina Chistiakova	Yes	86.7%	19.35	Yes	78.6%	20.69	Yes	40.0%	19.00	No		
(Russia) Irina Chistiakova	Yes	26.7%	17.00	No								
(South Korea) Seong-Jin Cho	Yes	100%	23.24	Yes	92.9%	22.50	Yes	93.3%	23.29	Yes	8.41	1
(Singapore) Shaun Yung Sheng Choo	No											
(France) Valentin Cotton	No											
(Poland) Aleksandra Hortensja Dąbek	No											
(Japan) Chisaki Doi	No											
(China) Fei-Fei Dong	No											
(Poland) Michał Dziewior	No											
(France) Thibaud Epp	No											
(Italy) Martina Frezzotti	No											
(United Kingdom) Ashley Fripp	Yes	33.3%	16.71	No								
(Japan) Madoka Fukami	No											
(Japan) Yasuko Furumi	Yes	13.3%	16.71	No								
(Germany) Anton Gerzenberg	No											
(Netherlands) (Italy) Saskia Giorgini	Yes	0.0%	15.35	No								
(Poland) Katarzyna Gołofit	Yes	Withdrew										
(Japan) Eriko Gomita	No											
(Poland) Adam Mikołaj Goździewski	Yes	53.3%	17.65	No								
(Hungary) Ivett Gyöngyösi	Yes	80.0%	19.65	Yes	28.6%	17.38	No					
(United States) Anna Han	No											
(South Korea) Chi Ho Han	Yes	86.7%	20.71	Yes	57.1%	19.31	Yes	26.7%	19.29	No		
(France) Olof Hansen	Yes	73.3%	19.00	Yes	21.4%	16.88	No					
(South Korea) Minsoo Hong	No											
(China) Ruoyu Huang	No											
(China) Zhi Chao Julian Jia	Yes	93.3%	21.12	Yes	21.4%	17.13	No					
(China) Wenbin Jin	No											
(Croatia) Aljoša Jurinić	Yes	80.0%	20.24	Yes	50.0%	18.81	Yes	50.0%	20.31	Yes	2.94	No
(South Korea) Joo Yeon Ka	Yes	0.0%	15.47	No								
(Japan) Takuya Kambara	No											
(Japan) Airi Katada	No											
(Russia) Ruslan Kazakov	No											
(South Korea) Daye Kim	No											
(South Korea) Honggi Kim	Yes	33.3%	17.00	No								
(South Korea) Su Yeon Kim	Yes	66.7%	18.35	Yes	50.0%	19.31	Yes	7.1%	17.44	No		
(South Korea) Sung-Jae Kim	No											
(South Korea) Sunhwa Kim	No											
(South Korea) Yedam Kim	Yes	53.3%	17.71	No								
(South Korea) Yoon-Jee Kim	No											
(South Korea) Yoonji Kim	No											
(Japan) Yurika Kimura	Yes	33.3%	17.53	No								
(Ukraine) Dinara Klinton	—	100%	22.00	Yes	57.1%	19.44	Yes	42.9%	19.81	No		
(United States) Carmen Knoll	No											
(Japan) Aimi Kobayashi	Yes	93.3%	21.29	Yes	85.7%	19.75	Yes	50.0%	19.13	Yes	4.35	No
(Japan) Kaito Kobayashi	No											
(Poland) Julia Kociuban	No											
(Japan) Aika Kondo	No											
(China) Qi Kong	Yes	66.7%	19.18	Yes	28.6%	17.94	No					
(Czech Republic) Marek Kozák	Yes	80.0%	18.94	Yes	64.3%	19.25	Yes	0.0%	18.41	No		
(Poland) Mischa Kozłowski	No											
(Poland) Łukasz Krupiński	—	60.0%	17.82	Yes	57.1%	19.13	Yes	0.0%	17.94	No		
(Poland) Krzysztof Książek	—	80.0%	18.82	Yes	64.3%	18.69	Yes	46.7%	20.12	No		
(United States) Rachel Naomi Kudo	—	64.3%	18.75	Yes	35.7%	17.81	No					
(South Korea) Chulmin Lee	No											
(South Korea) EunAe Lee	No											
(South Korea) Jae Yoon Lee	No											
(South Korea) Yurim Lee	No											
(United States) George Li	Yes	Withdrew										
(China) Ning Yuen Li	Yes	Withdrew										
(China) Yihao Li	No											
(United States) Kate Liu	Yes	71.4%	18.88	Yes	92.9%	21.31	Yes	100%	23.44	Yes	7.50	3
(United States) Eric Lu	—	100%	21.81	Yes	85.7%	21.13	Yes	92.9%	22.13	Yes	6.44	4th
(China) Tian Lu	Yes	26.7%	16.82	No								
(China) Xin Luo	Yes	50.0%	17.63	No								
(China) Weiwen Ma	No											
(Russia) Aleksandr Maltsev	No											
(Russia) Roman Martynov	Yes	20.0%	16.18	No								
(Japan) Nagino Maruyama	Yes	53.3%	18.18	No								
(France) Guillaume Masson	No											
(Sweden) Viktor Yuandong Mattsson	No											
(Russia) Vladimir Matusevich	Yes	Withdrew										
(Italy) Alessandro Mazzamuto	No											
(Japan) Nao Mieno	Yes	20.0%	16.88	No								
(Poland) Łukasz Mikołajczyk	Yes	86.7%	19.35	Yes	20.0%	17.65	No					
(France) Nathalia Milstein	No											
(Poland) Paweł Motyczyński	Yes	40.0%	17.24	No								
(Greece) (Venezuela) Alexia Mouza	Yes	86.7%	20.76	Yes	40.0%	16.35	No					
(South Korea) Jiyeong Mun	Yes	Withdrew										
(Poland) Karolina Nadolska	No											
(Japan) Kotaro Nagano	No											
(Japan) Mayaka Nakagawa	Yes	93.3%	20.65	Yes	13.3%	17.06	No					
(Japan) Nozomi Nakagiri	—	57.1%	17.69	No								
(Japan) Fuyuko Nakamura	No											
(Japan) Yui Nakamura	No											
(Poland) Szymon Nehring	Yes	86.7%	20.59	Yes	73.3%	19.53	Yes	53.3%	19.47	Yes	3.41	No
(Russia) Anastasiia Nesterova	Yes	26.7%	16.88	No								
(Poland) Grzegorz Niemczuk	No											
(Indonesia) Ronald Noerjadi	Yes	46.7%	18.25	No								
(Japan) Mariko Nogami	Yes	46.7%	17.56	No								
(Poland) Piotr Nowak	Yes	85.7%	20.19	Yes	50.0%	18.25	No					
(Japan) Arisa Onoda	Yes	53.3%	18.76	Yes	6.7%	16.24	No					
(Latvia) Georgijs Osokins	Yes	93.3%	21.35	Yes	93.3%	21.53	Yes	80.0%	20.88	Yes	3.59	No
(Japan) Misora Ozaki	No											
(China) Linzi Pan	No											
(South Korea) Jinhyung Park	Yes	64.3%	18.81	Yes	33.3%	17.94	No					
(Poland) Piotr Ryszard Pawlak	Yes	64.3%	18.00	No								
(Poland) Zuzanna Pietrzak	Yes	21.4%	16.13	No								
(Poland) Adam Piórkowski	No											
(Switzerland) François-Xavier Poizat	No											
(Hong Kong) Tiffany Poon	Yes	28.6%	17.25	No								
(Ukraine) Markiyan Popil	No											
(United Kingdom) Kausikan Rajeshkumar	Yes	14.3%	15.25	No								
(Japan) Kiana Reid	No											
(Canada) Charles Richard-Hamelin	Yes	100%	22.38	Yes	100%	22.65	Yes	100%	23.53	Yes	8.12	2
(Poland) Joanna Różewska-Kulasińska	No											
(Japan) Arisa Sakai	No											
(Uzbekistan) Tamila Salimdjanova	Yes	30.8%	17.00	No								
(Romania) Cristian Ioan Sandrin	Yes	7.1%	15.63	No								
(Japan) Motohiro Sato	No											
(Czech Republic) Natalie Schwamová	Yes	35.7%	18.06	No								
(Hong Kong) Aristo Sham	Yes	Withdrew										
(China) Boyang Shi	Yes	0.0%	16.00	No								
(South Korea) HyoJin Shin	No											
(Russia) Dmitry Shishkin	Yes	64.3%	18.94	Yes	93.3%	20.76	Yes	60.0%	20.24	Yes	4.41	6th
(Russia) Alexandra Sikorskaya	No											
(South Korea) Jeung Beum Sohn	No											
(Taiwan) Szuyu Su	No											
(Japan) Rina Sudo	Yes	71.4%	18.44	Yes	20.0%	17.41	No					
(South Korea) Yekwon Sunwoo	No											
(Poland) Michał Szymanowski	Yes	100%	20.54	Yes	46.2%	18.43	No					
(Poland) Julia Maria Śliwa	No											
(Japan) Rikono Takeda	Yes	23.1%	17.07	No								
(Russia) Arseny Tarasevich-Nikolaev	Yes	92.9%	20.13	Yes	20.0%	16.24	No					
(United States) Alexei Tartakovsky	Yes	71.4%	18.56	Yes	66.7%	20.06	Yes	40.0%	19.65	No		
(China) Hin-Yat Tsang	Yes	46.2%	18.27	No								
(Japan) Kanade Tsurusawa	No											
(Ukraine) Anna Ulaieva	No											
(United Kingdom) Alexander Ullman	Yes	69.2%	18.67	Yes	42.9%	17.63	No					
(China) Chao Wang	Yes	71.4%	19.25	Yes	46.7%	18.35	No					
(United States) Chelsea Wang	No											
(China) Zhu Wang	Yes	38.5%	18.20	No								
(Poland) Marcin Wieczorek	No											
(Poland) Andrzej Wierciński	—	92.3%	19.93	Yes	42.9%	18.50	No					
(United States) Evan Wong	No											
(Canada) Victoria Wong	No											
(United States) Joshua Wright	No											
(China) Yuchong Wu	Yes	21.4%	17.38	No								
(China) Qi Xu	No											
(China) Zi Xu	Yes	84.6%	20.13	Yes	57.1%	18.63	Yes	21.4%	18.56	No		
(Canada) Tony Yike Yang	Yes	100%	21.40	Yes	85.7%	21.19	Yes	100%	21.88	Yes	4.56	5th
(Belarus) Yuliya Yermalayeva	Yes	28.6%	17.56	No								
(United States) Tianpeng Yu	No											
(Ukraine) Olga Zado (Zadorozhniuk)	No											
(China) Cheng Zhang	Yes	85.7%	21.44	Yes	40.0%	17.59	No					
(China) Chuhan Zhang	Yes	42.9%	18.06	No								
(Canada) Annie Zhou	Yes	100%	20.67	Yes	21.4%	17.19	No					
(China) Ning Zhou	No											
(Russia) Anastasia Zorina	No											
