= Dmitry Shishkin =

Russian classical pianist (born 1992)

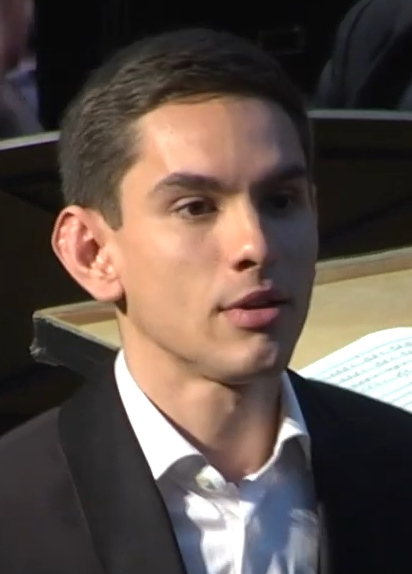
- Dmitry Shishkin in June 2019

Background information
- Born: Dmitry Igorevich Shishkin; 12 February 1992 (age 34); Chelyabinsk, Russia
- Genre: Classical music
- Years active: 2013 – present
- Website: shishkindmitry.com

Dmitry Igorevich Shishkin (Russian: Дмитрий Игоревич Шишкин), born on 12 February 1992, is a Russian classical pianist. He is best known for winning the 2nd prize at the XVI International Tchaikovsky Competition in 2019.

In 2018, he won 1st prize at the Geneva International Music Competition. He was also awarded 6th prize at the XVIIth International Chopin Piano Competition in 2015.

== Career ==
Born in Chelyabinsk on 12 February 1992 into a Russian family, his first piano teacher was his mother, Irina Shishkina, a teacher and pianist. By age two, he could already play short works, gave his first concert at the age of three, and performed with an orchestra three years later.

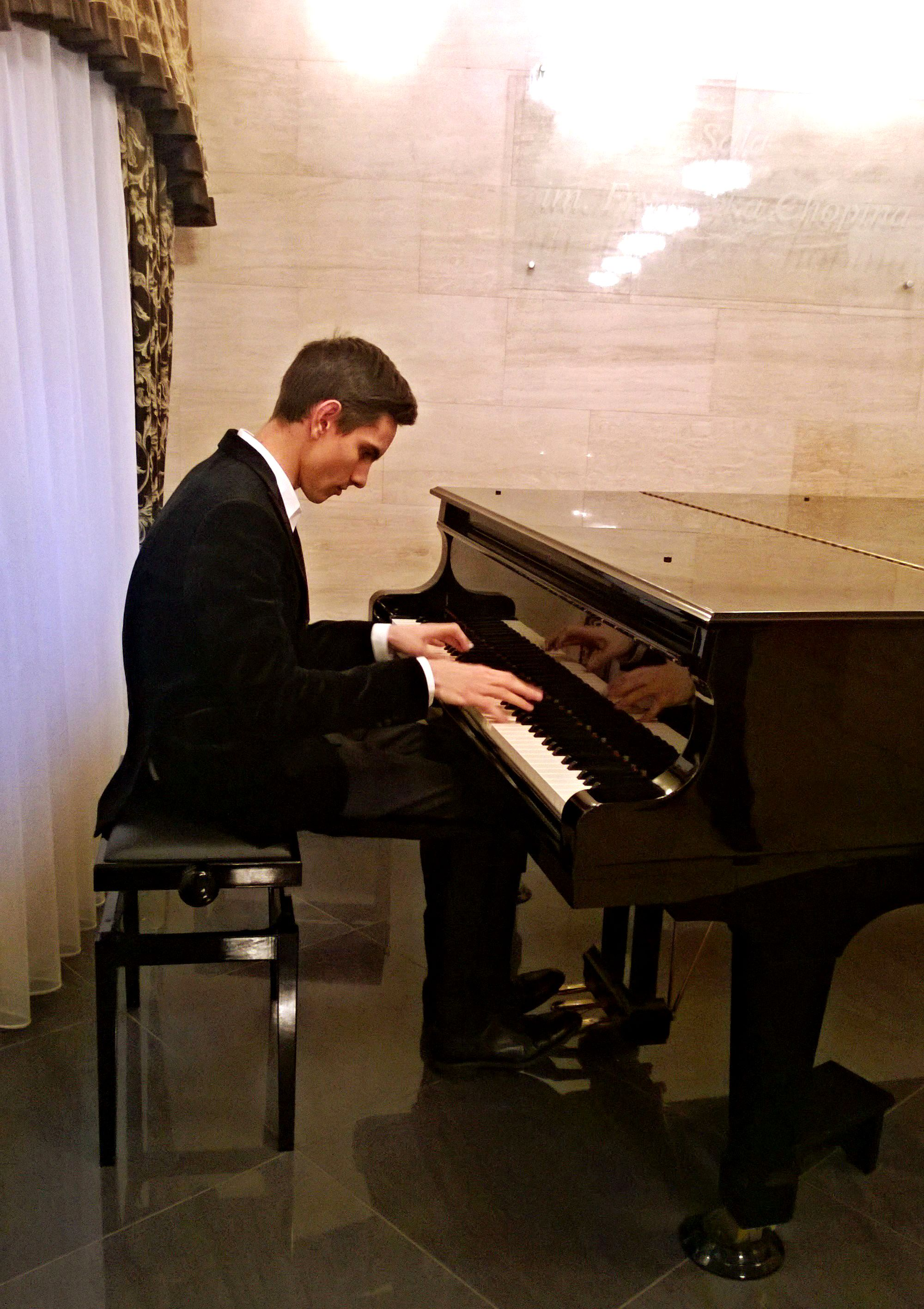
Dmitry Shishkin, 2016

From the age of four, he attended the Pyotr Tchaikovsky School in his home city. After five years, he entered the Gnessin State Musical College in Moscow where he studied with Mikhail Khokhlov. Since 2010, he has studied at the Moscow Conservatory with Eliso Virsaladze. In that same year, he played Tchaikovsky's Piano Concerto No. 1 in front of the public and the state authorities on Red Square, with the 'Virtuosos of Gnessin' Orchestra conducted by Mikhail Khokhlov. Then he completed an internship with Epifanio Comis at Bellini Conservatory.

He has won many prizes, including in the 59th Ferruccio Busoni Competition (2013, Third Prize) and in Russia, China, Germany, Bulgaria, and Poland competitions. He has also competed in the 17th International Chopin Piano Competition (2015, Sixth Prize). He has performed with orchestras across Russia, including the Moscow State Symphony and Moscow Philharmonic. He has performed in Bulgaria, Germany, Italy, Spain, France, the UK, Japan, Austria, Taiwan, China, Poland, and South Korea. Besides piano, he also composes. He lives in Switzerland.

His 2020 album was reviewed in Gramophone, which described the playing as "of a very high order, as befits a Geneva first prize and Tchaikovsky Silver Medal winner."

== Recordings ==
- Chopin (2016, Fryderyk Chopin Institute)
- Absolute Chopin (2017, KNS)
- Polonia (2019, Fryderyk Chopin Institute)
- Medtner, Scriabin, Rachmaninoff (2020, Concours de Genève)
