= Tiffany Poon =

Classical pianist (born 1996)

- 潘活活
- Born: 29 December 1996 (age 29); British Hong Kong
- Education: Juilliard School; Columbia University (BA)
- Occupation: Pianist
- Years active: 2008-present
- Website: tiffanypoon.com

Tiffany Poon (Chinese: 潘活活; born December 29, 1996) is an American classical pianist and visual artist, residing in New York City.

== Career ==
Born in Hong Kong, Poon began taking piano lessons at the age of four. At nine, she moved to New York to study at the Juilliard School Pre-College Division for eight years with a full scholarship, under the guidance of Yoheved Kaplinsky. She studied at Calhoun School for high school, where she graduated in 2014. She continued her studies at the Columbia University / Juilliard School exchange program with Emanuel Ax and Joseph Kalichstein. In May 2018, she graduated from Columbia University as a John Jay Scholar with a Bachelor of Arts in philosophy.

Poon made her concerto debut at the age of 10, appearing with orchestras and in recital throughout the United States, Canada, Europe, Australia and China. Among the venues where she has performed are Carnegie Hall, Steinway Hall in New York City, and Sala Mozart in Bologna, Italy. She has appeared as a soloist with the Plainfield Symphony Orchestra, Fort Smith Symphony Orchestra, ProMusica Chamber Orchestra, and the Moscow Chamber Orchestra of Pavel Slobodkin Centre.

Poon has been active on social media since 2017 and expanded into video blogging when the COVID-19 pandemic ended live performances. As of December 2024, Poon's YouTube channel had 328,000 subscribers: "Of course, it took years. I only started making vlogs because I thought that classical music lacked human elements. Composers are dead and current musicians don't really talk about themselves as humans."

In 2020, Poon founded Together with Classical, a non-profit charity intended to unite people and communities by promoting classical music. It supports and funds classical music education programs and opportunities.

It's kind of sad that classical music is said to be dying, [but] it feels like I'm making an impact on the world, and I'd like to continue inspiring more generations to appreciate classical music because I've been getting more and more messages from my audience that they were inspired to play because of me. And that means a lot to me, because it means that I'm doing something significant and worth my time.

— Tiffany Poon

== Awards ==
- 2012: First Prize and Best Performance of Concerto Award, 8th Moscow International Frederic Chopin Competition for Young Pianists
- 2013: Kaufman Music Center International Youth Piano Competition
- 2014: National YoungArts Winner in the United States
- 2014: First Prize, Juilliard Pre-College Concerto Competition
- 2014: Second Prize, 10th Chopin Golden Ring International Competition, Slovenia
- 2015: Participant of the XVII International Chopin Piano Competition in Warsaw, Poland
- 2016: First Prize, Manhattan International Music Competition
- 2016: Third Prize, 17th International Robert Schumann Competition, Germany
- 2016: Third Prize, “Debut at the Berlin Philharmonic Hall” International Concerto Competition
- 2017: Second prize, Walter W. Naumburg Foundation International Competition
- 2019: Second Place, KlavierOlymp of the Kissinger Sommer festival, Germany
- 2019: Young Artist Award, Hessen Agency at the Rheingau Music Festival.
- 2025: Robert Schumann Prize of the City of Zwickau
- 2026: Libera Awards, Best Classical Record – Nature album [Pentatone]

== Discography ==
- Natural Beauty - J.S. Bach, Haydn, Chopin, Liszt, Debussy, Kawai Edition, 2014
- Edition Klavier-Festival Ruhr Vol. 38: Festivaldebüts 2019
- The Dvorak Album - with Jan Vogler, Kevin Zhu, Chad Hoopes, Matthew Lipman and Juho Pohjonen, Sony Classical, 2022
- Diaries | Schumann - Robert Schumann, Pentatone, 2024
- Diaries: Schumann (Vinyl re-issue) - Robert Schumann, Pentatone, 2024
- Nature - Daquin, Couperin, Rameau, Alkan, Fauré, Saint-Saëns, Debussy, Ravel, L. Boulanger, Pentatone, 2025
