= Pianoforte (2023 film) =

- Directed by: Jakub Piątek
- Production company: Telemark Sp. z o.o.
- Release date: February 16, 2023
- Running time: 91 minutes
- Country: Poland
- Languages: Slovenian; Polish; English; Chinese; Italian; Russian

Pianoforte is a 2023 Polish documentary directed by Jakub Piątek, which follows young pianists from all over the world participating in the Chopin Competition, one of the most prestigious classical music competitions, held every five years in Warsaw. The film received recognition from the Polish Film Academy, which honored it with the Best Documentary award, and it is also the first Polish documentary to receive an International Emmy Award.

== Synopsis ==
A documentary that takes you behind the scenes of the International Chopin Piano Competition, one of the most prestigious classical music competitions.

== Cast ==
- Leonora Armellini
- Alexander Gadjiev
- Eva Gevorgyan
- Hyuk Lee
- Hao Rao
- Marcin Wieczorek

== Critical reception ==
In its review of the documentary, Screen International wrote, "The film closely follows several competitors, showcasing their personalities and coming-of-age stories, along with the pressure and scrutiny they face ... Piątek skillfully balances the focus on the music with the personal narratives of the pianists, while exploring the tension, insecurities, and dreams of the young musicians, also highlighting the importance of the competition in their careers. The film stands out for its engaging pace, smart editing choices, and the way it blends moments of vulnerability with the grandeur of the music, making it accessible to an audience beyond classical music fans."

On review aggregator website Rotten Tomatoes, the film has an approval rating of 81% based on 26 reviews, with an average rating of 8.1/10.
