= Szymon Nehring =

Polish pianist

- Born: 29 September 1995 (age 30); Kraków, Poland
- Occupation: Pianist
- Instruments: Piano

Szymon Nehring (born 29 September 1995) is a Polish pianist.

Born in Kraków, Nehring began piano lessons at the age of five. He won the first prize in the 15th Arthur Rubinstein International Piano Master Competition in 2017, and additionally won the prize of Best Performer of a Chopin Piece, the Advanced Studies prize, the Junior Jury prize, as well as the Audience Favorite prize. Previously, he had been a finalist in the XVII International Chopin Piano Competition in 2015.

Nehring has performed with such orchestras as the Warsaw Philharmonic Orchestra, Santander Orchestra, Polish Sinfonia Iuventus Orchestra, the Israel Philharmonic Orchestra, and the Orchestra of the Eighteenth Century with conductors including Jerzy Maksymiuk, Jacek Kaspszyk, Grzegorz Nowak, Omer Meir Wellber, John Axelrod, and Krzysztof Penderecki. In 2017–2019 he was a student of Boris Berman in the Artist Diploma program at the Yale School of Music.

== Discography ==
Year	Album	Label
2015	Chopin: 12 Etudes, Op. 25; 4 Mazurkas, Op. 33; Nocturne in G major, Op. 37 No. 2; Barcarolle in F-sharp major, Op. 60; Polonaise in F-sharp minor, Op. 44	The National Institute of Frederic Chopin
2015	Chopin, Szymanowski, Mykietyn	Dux Records
2017	Frederic Chopin: Piano Concertos	Dux Records
