= Epifanio Comis =

Italian concert pianist and conductor

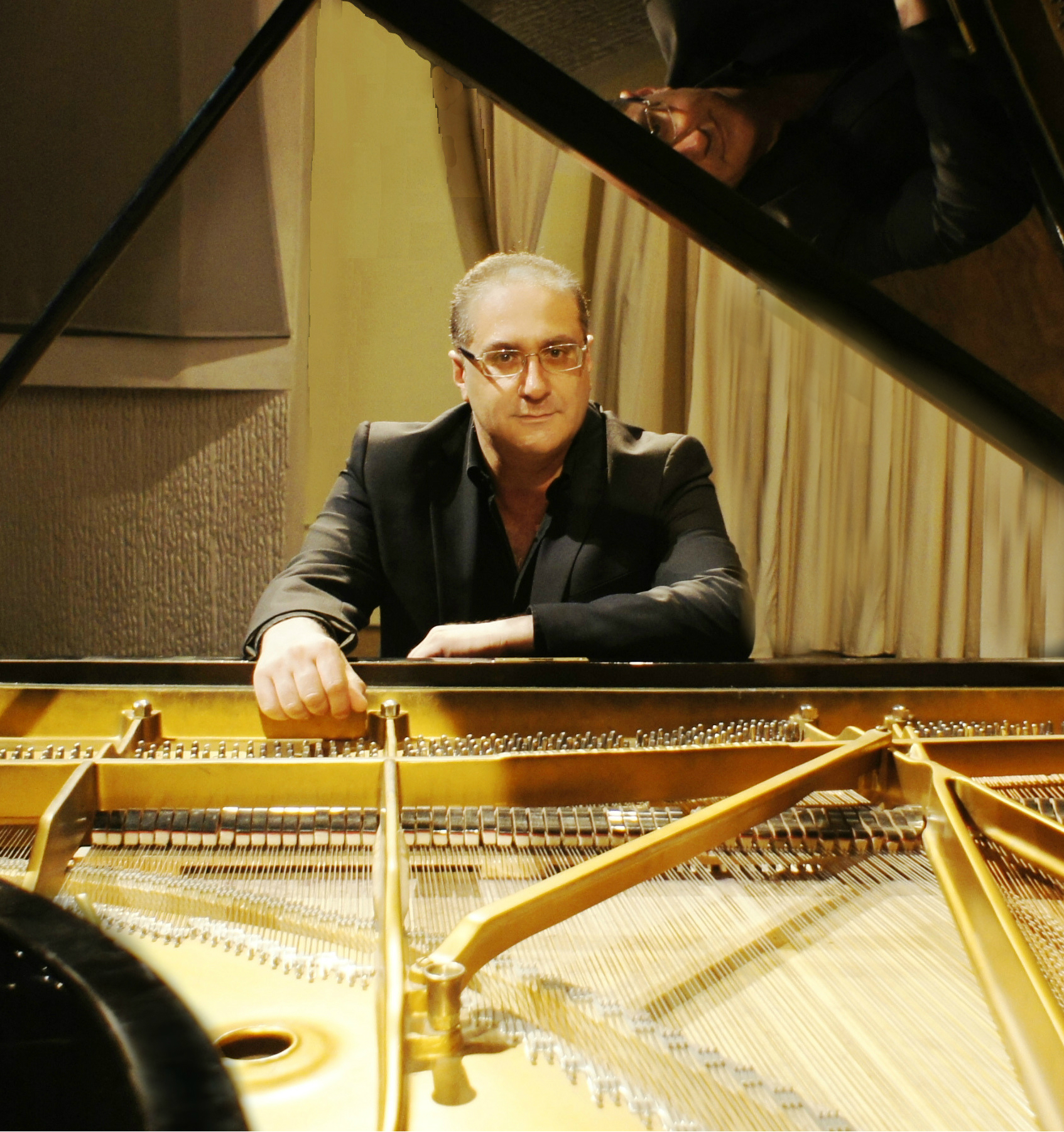

Background information
- Born: August 4, 1968 (age 58); Catania, Italy
- Genres: Classical
- Occupations: Pianist, Conductor
- Instrument: Piano
- Website: www.epifaniocomis.com

Epifanio Comis (born August 4, 1968, in Catania, Italy;) is an Italian concert pianist and conductor.

== Biography ==
Epifanio Comis is the winner more than 30 international and national music competitions. He studied at the “Vincenzo Bellini” music institute in Catania and he took the High specialization course diploma at the Euterpe Academy. His teachers were Agatella Catania, Boris Petrushansky and Piero Rattalino.

== Pianist ==
Epifanio Comis has toured as a soloist throughout Europe, Asia, Russia, and the United States. He has performed with numerous world class orchestras including the George Enescu Philharmonic Orchestra of Bucharest, the Radio Orchestra of Bucharest, the Philharmonic Orchestra of Kiev, the Karlovy Vary Symfonic Orchestra, the Philharmonic Orchestra of Szeged, the Philharmonic Orchestra of Cluj, the Tulare County Symphony Orchestra of California, the Plainfield Symphony Orchestra, the OrquestraSinfonica UANL of Mexico, the Orchestra Sinfonicadel Teatro Bellini di Catania, the Orchestra Sinfonica Siciliana, The Orchestra Filarmonica del Teatro Bellini, the Osaka Symphoniker, the Kioto Symphony.

== Conductor ==
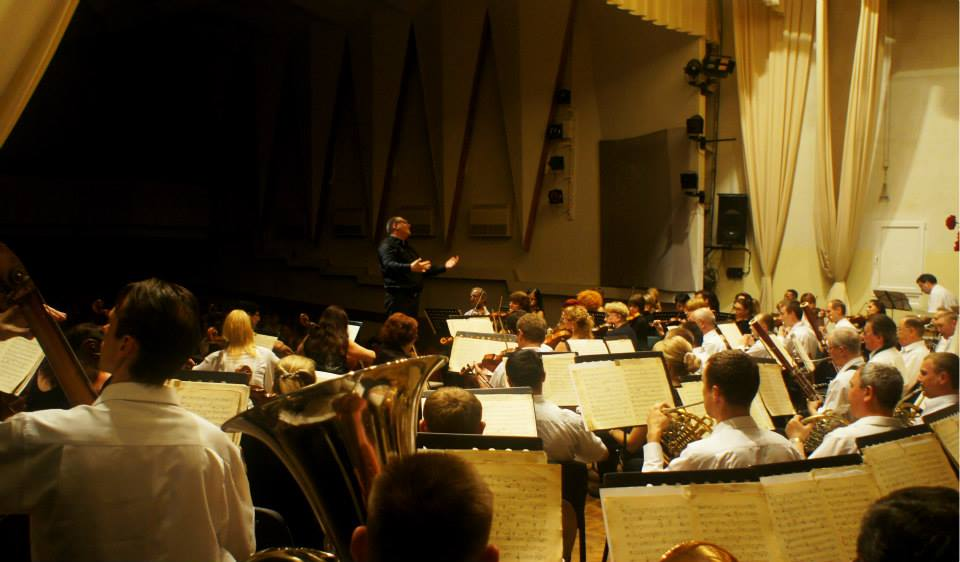
Conducting Rachmaninov

Midway through his pianistic career, Epifanio Comis branched into conducting. In May 2013 E. Comis conducted Filharmony Symphony Orchestra in Donetsk on Rachmaninoff Festival all Piano concertos and the Symphonies

== Teaching ==
Comis is on the teaching staff for the main piano course at the Vincenzo Bellini's conservatory in Catania and at Accademia Pianistica Siciliana. Students of Comis have won a number of international prizes. In 2013, his student Alessandro Mazzamuto won the International Classical Music Awards – ICMA as a ‘Young Artist of the Year’ In addition to his performing career, E. Comis has served as jury member for several international piano competitions, including International Piano Rachmaninov Competition in Moscow. Professor Comis is invited yearly to piano master classes at the Hunter College in New York, at the North Carolina University, at the Duke University of Durham, at the Ecole Normale de Musique of Paris, at the Thessaloniki State Conservatory, at the Monterrey University in Mexico, at the Manhattan School of Music NY, at the West Chester University Philadelphia, Cienna Music Academy "Orpheus", at the State Moscow Conservatoire by Tchaikovsky and at Chopin Academy in Warsaw and Chopin college in Moscow where he also gives a Superior Music Course on the Concert for piano and orchestra.

== Academia ==
In 2011, Comis created Accademia Pianistica Siciliana in Catania. In 2014, the academy collaborated with the University of Catania

Epifanio Comis is also the artistic director of ConcertFest Accademia Pianistica Siciliana in Moscow.

In 2014, Comis organised the International Chamber Music Festival in Catania "Le Grandi Serate Musicali" with supporting of Accademia Pianistica Siciliana and “C&G Cioccolato e Gelato.

== Rachmaninov Award ==
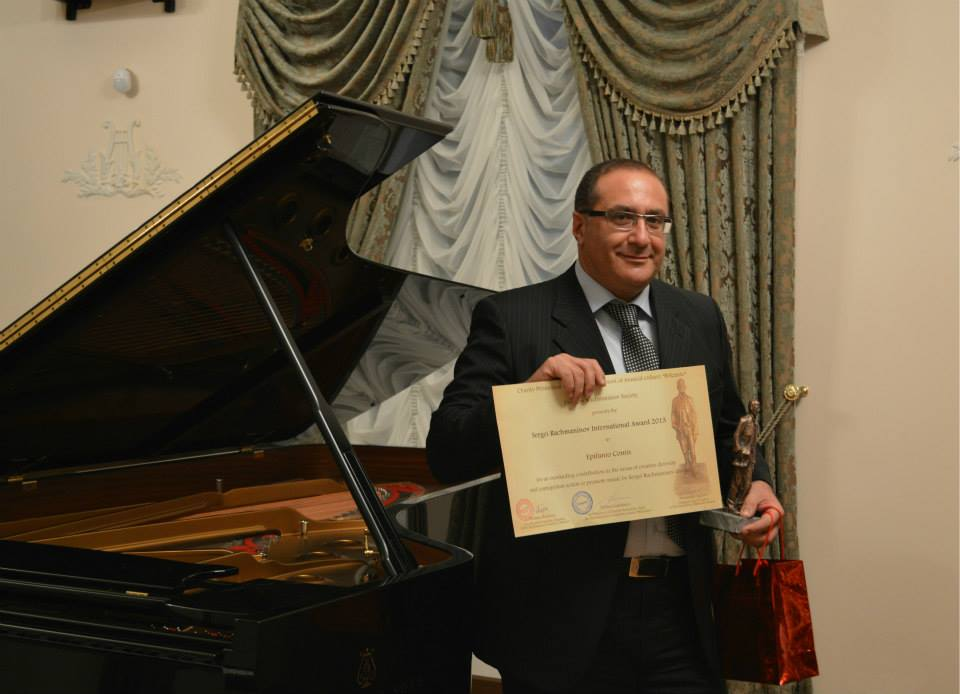
Rachmaninov Award

In 2013, Epifanio Comis received the First International Sergei Rachmaninov Award.
