= Krzysztof Książek =

Polish classical pianist from Krakow (born 1992)

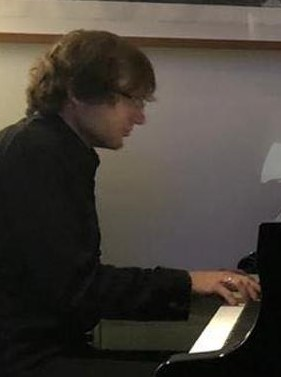

Background information
- Born: 5 August 1992 (age 33); Kraków; Poland
- Genres: Classical music
- Occupations: Pianist; Composer
- Website: krzysztofksiążek.com

Krzysztof Książek (born 5 August 1992) is a Polish classical pianist.
