= Rondo in A minor (Mozart) =

1787 composition for solo piano by W. A. Mozart

Rondo
- by W. A. Mozart
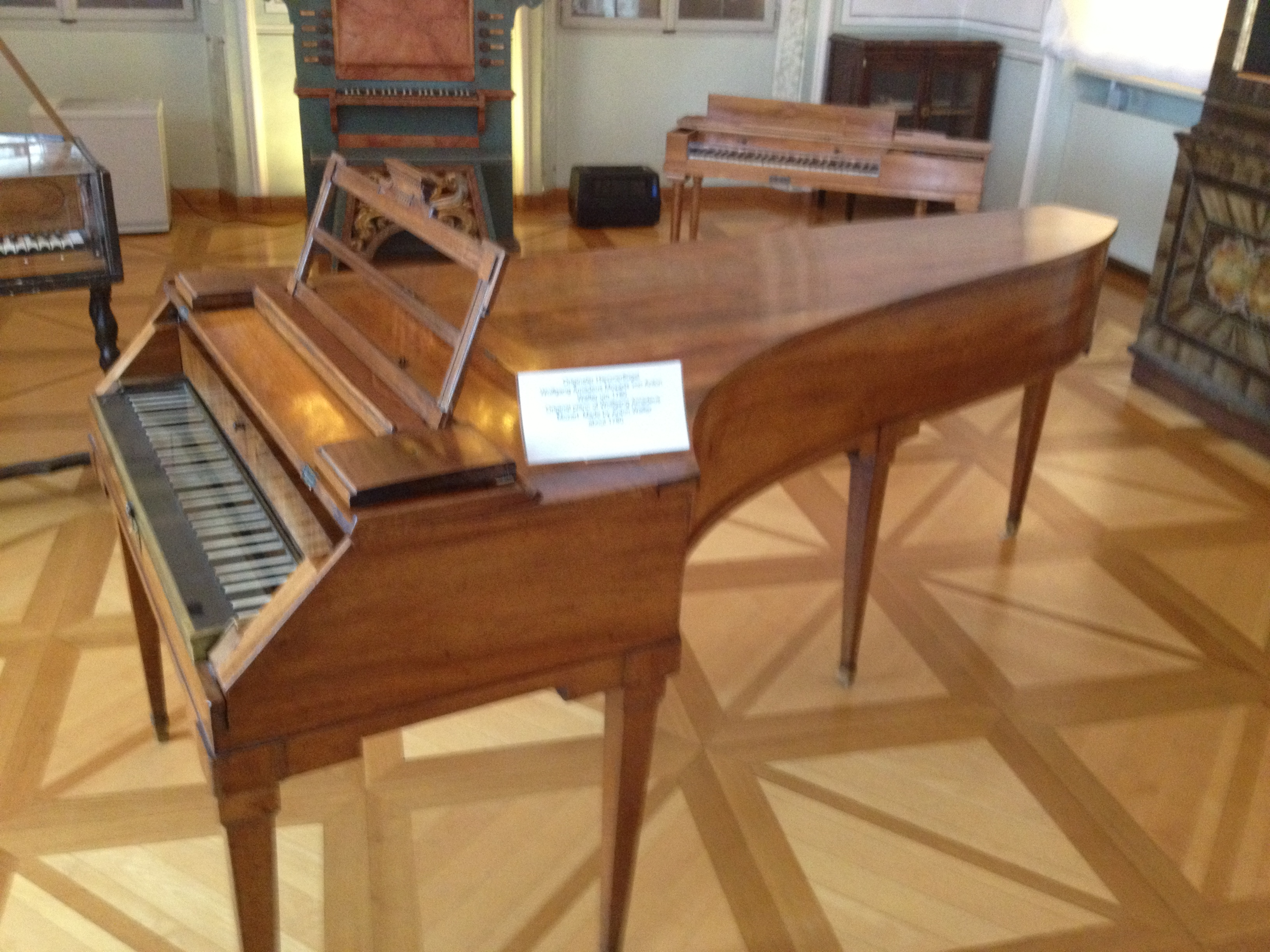
- The piano Mozart owned in 1787, built by Anton Walter
- Key: A minor
- Catalogue: K. 511
- Composed: 1787
- Published: 1787

The Rondo in A minor, K. 511, is a work for solo piano by Wolfgang Amadeus Mozart, composed and published in 1787. The work's theme contains the first eight notes of the ascending chromatic scale, from A to E.

== Composition, premiere, and publication ==
Mozart recorded the completion of the Rondo in his personal thematic catalog on 11 March 1787; (Note: The autograph manuscript is also dated 11 March.) he was age 31 at the time and had only recently returned from a triumphant journey to Prague, where he witnessed great success for a new production of his 1786 opera The Marriage of Figaro, for his Symphony No. 38, and for his own solo piano performances. Abert notes some other major works of this stage in Mozart's life: the Rondo shortly preceded the beginning of work on Don Giovanni; and instrumental pieces from 1787 include the Third and Fourth String Quintets as well as the string serenade Eine kleine Nachtmusik.

No musical sketches for the Rondo survive. This is not surprising, since as Ulrich Konrad has noted, none of the many surviving Mozart sketches are for solo keyboard works; apparently Mozart felt no need to sketch in his native performing medium. Simon Keefe even suggests that the Rondo was not created through ordinary musical composition but rather was improvised on the spot, perhaps before an audience in Prague during his trip there (January–February 1787), or at a Vienna concert on 11 February 1787.

No record survives of Mozart having premiered the completed Rondo in public. Aside from Keefe's suggestion above, a different guess is entertained by Scheideler: "Since subscription [i.e., benefit] concerts of two of [Mozart's] musician friends took place shortly after he completed the work (that of the oboist Friedrich Ramm on 14 March and of the bass singer Ludwig Karl Fischer on 21 March), and works by Mozart were ascertainably performed there ... it seems plausible to assume that the Rondo in A minor was also given its first performance at one of these concerts."

The Rondo was published (1787) by Franz Anton Hoffmeister in Vienna, and reissued by a variety of publishers in the years after Mozart's death in 1791. The Hoffmeister publication consisted of a volume of works for piano by Mozart and other composers; it was issued as part of a monthly subscription series (Note: Of the series Edge (2001), p. 1006 writes, "In 1785, ... Hoffmeister initiated three separate subscription series of musical publications, one for 'chamber music' (including symphonies and concertos, as well as works for smaller ensembles), one for keyboard music (including concertos and chamber music, as well as solo pieces), and a third for flute music (including concertos and chamber music)." Mozart's own 22 issues of the series at the time of his death in 1791 entitled Prénumération pour le Forte Piano ou Clavecin.) The title is in French. For "prénumération" see Praenumeration. "Pour le Forte Piano ou Clavecin" means "for the piano or harpsichord". The specific term fortepiano is widely used in modern times to designate the early version of the piano for which Mozart composed; in Mozart's day it was simply one of several words used to denote the piano. Concerning "or harpsichord", an effective performance of the Rondo on this instrument seems hard to imagine, but well into Beethoven's time music publishers used the phrase "or harpsichord" to encourage sales of music composed for piano, including even the "Moonlight" Sonata.

An alternative to buying printed music in Mozart's day was the purchase of handwritten copies. Later in 1787 (17 October), an advertisement in the Wiener Zeitung announced that manuscript copies of the Rondo (price 1 florin) were available from the copyist Johann Traeg, who had previously issued three of Mozart's piano concertos. Traeg frequently produced unauthorized copies of composers' works; there is no evidence whether or not his version the Rondo was created with Mozart's cooperation.

Several editions of the Rondo are available today. The modern editor will generally rely on surviving copies of the Hoffmeister edition and on facsimile editions of the original autograph (hand-written) manuscript. (Note: The autograph is currently in private ownership and not available to scholars, but before its disappearance it was photographed and published in facsimile. Scheideler lists the following as a published version of the autograph facsimile: Musikalische Seltenheiten ("Musical Rarities"). Wiener Liebhaberdrucke, vol. V. Wolfgang Amadeus Mozart. "Zwei Rondos D-Dur und A-Moll". Edited after the manuscripts in facsimile reproduction by Hans Gál, Vienna, New York, 1923.) The two sources differ in dozens of places, though mostly just in details of phrasing or articulation. The edition by Scheideler relies primarily on the autograph, but includes a list of all the divergences. (Note: The same document describes varying opinion concerning which of the two main sources should be considered the more reliable.)

== Music ==
Rondo No. 3 in A minor, K.511
Performed by David H. Porter.

The work consists of a single movement; it is in 6/8 time and the tempo marking is Andante.

=== Form ===
The work follows the common A–B–A–C–A pattern characteristic of the rondo form; "A" is a returning theme and "B" and "C" are episodes. "A" is in A minor (the key of the piece), "B" is in F major, and "C" is in A major. Following the last appearance of "A" there is a coda that draws on the music for A as well as a minor key version of C.

Each of the five major sections is itself structured. "A" is in ternary form, "a b a", opening with a passage "a" in A minor, a middle section "b" that modulates to C major (the relative major), then an ornamented repetition of "a". The middle rendition of "A" is truncated, consisting of just one repetition of "a" rather than the full "a b a".

Concerning the episodes "B" and "C", Forte suggests that each is a brief instantiation of sonata form; it moves to the dominant key in the first part (exposition), and in the second part first explores remote keys (development) then returns to the original material all in the tonic key (recapitulation). Each episode ends in a transitional passage returning to the key of the following "A" section; Forte notes that these transitions are "very long in comparison to the other parts."

=== Musical texture ===
As Cowdery notes, the three main sections "A", "B", and "C" divide the beat into progressively smaller units: "A" primarily uses eighth notes while "B" uses sixteenths and "C" uses triplet sixteenths.

The work abounds in chromatic passages (i.e., involving closely spaced notes drawn from outside the set of pitches of the keynote scale). For example, in the third and fourth bars, the melody line covers the first eight notes of the ascending chromatic scale going upward from the tonic note (A, B♭, B, C, C♯, D, D♯, E).

The "A" section is ornamented with increasing extravagance with each of its returns.

The transitions from "B" and "C" back to "A" are in free form and bear the hallmarks of a fantasia or concerto cadenza, with rapid modulations to new keys, "drifting arpeggios and diminished harmonies".

== Performance practice ==
Since the work is so heavily ornamented, performers are obliged to arrive at decisions concerning the meaning of Mozart's musical notation for the ornaments. Konrad Wolff offers a clear criterion, namely an appeal to the influential textbook on violin playing written (and published in Mozart's birth year 1756) by the composer's father Leopold: "As for embellishments, Mozart was very much his father's child, which is to say that one can find most answers by studying Leopold Mozart's Gründliche Violinschule." Based on this criterion, Wolff judges that in general, performers should play embellishments on, rather than before, the beat – though for the main theme of the K. 511 rondo, which features a prominent triple grace note (see quotation above), Wolff allows for the possibility of playing it before the beat as well.

In bars 134–135, the rising sequence of the main theme receives a particularly intense form of ornamentation: every note is trilled.

(Due to software limitations, the trills and turns in the scores are not executed in the sound file.)

Wolff also addresses this sort of passage, saying "trill chains must be smoothly connected, with no accent given to the new trill tone at its entrance." The basis for his advice is a piano exercise taught by Mozart to his pupil Johann Nepomuk Hummel and recalled later by Hummel in his own textbook (Note: "The exercise consists of trilling the same two white keys, changing fingers but without interrupting the flow." See Wolff (1990), pp. 108–109.)

A number of the ornaments and variations are not notated with signs, but simply written out by Mozart in ordinary music notation. These can be taken more or less at face value, but they are of great importance for performance practice nonetheless, as they bear on issues and controversies in historically informed performance. The reason is that many other works of Mozart are notated quite sparely, with nothing like the layers of ornamentation he added onto the repetitions of the main theme of the Rondo in A Minor. One view is that Mozart himself, who was famed for his ability at musical improvisation, would embellish such passages on the spot. However, when serving others, as in writing cadenzas for his piano concertos (which he improvised in his own performances) or writing for publication, he would fill in the details.

Robert Levin (1990) has argued forcefully that modern performers should ornament the plainer repeated passages of Mozart scores, just as (he believes) Mozart himself did; and he faults modern conservatories sharply for failing to provide young performers with the instruction (particularly in music theory) they would need to do this.

For performers who seek to follow Levin's recommendation, (Note: N.B. The opposite view has also been taken; Charles Rosen felt that ornamentation was anachronistic in Mozart's own time – "a dead weight from an earlier style" – and urged performers to shun it in most contexts. See his The Classical Style (New York: Norton, 1970, 2nd ed. 1997), pp. 100–108; the quotation is from p. 101.) works like the Rondo in A Minor are of great value: the finished work, written out so painstakingly, is a sort of compendium of Mozartean ornamentational technique from which the modern player can learn. To help make this point, Levin juxtaposes all ten appearances of the Rondo's main motif in musical notation, illustrating the striking variety of decoration and restatement that Mozart achieved.

One of the ways in which the main theme is decorated appears at measures 86–87: it is much like the ornamentation of measures 5–6, but the melody notes that would normally appear on the musical beat are delayed slightly, with a sixteenth rest appearing on the beat instead. The left hand plays on the beat as usual.

Measures 5–6:

Measures 86–87:

This kind of ornamentation has been identified as the 18th-century version of tempo rubato; the left hand accompaniment remains steady, but the right hand imposes a slight delay in the melody notes. Further discussion of this practice, with reference to K. 511 but also citation of 18th-century authorities, was provided by Roland Jackson. The practice was described by Mozart himself in a letter to his father. (Note: The letter, which he wrote while traveling in Augsburg in 1777, says "... besides, I always keep correct time. They are all wondering about that. They simply can't believe that you can play a Tempo rubato in an Adagio, and the left hand knows nothing about it but goes on playing in strict time. As far as they know, the left hand always follows the right." Translation from Spaethling, Robert (2000) Mozart's Letters, Mozart's Life. New York, Norton, p. 81.) (Note: A comment by Rowland (1998:28) suggests that the amount of delay and articulation of the notes is only loosely approximated by the musical notation; "even this amount of detail must surely have been inadequate to express the subtlety of Mozart's playing".)

== Critical reception ==
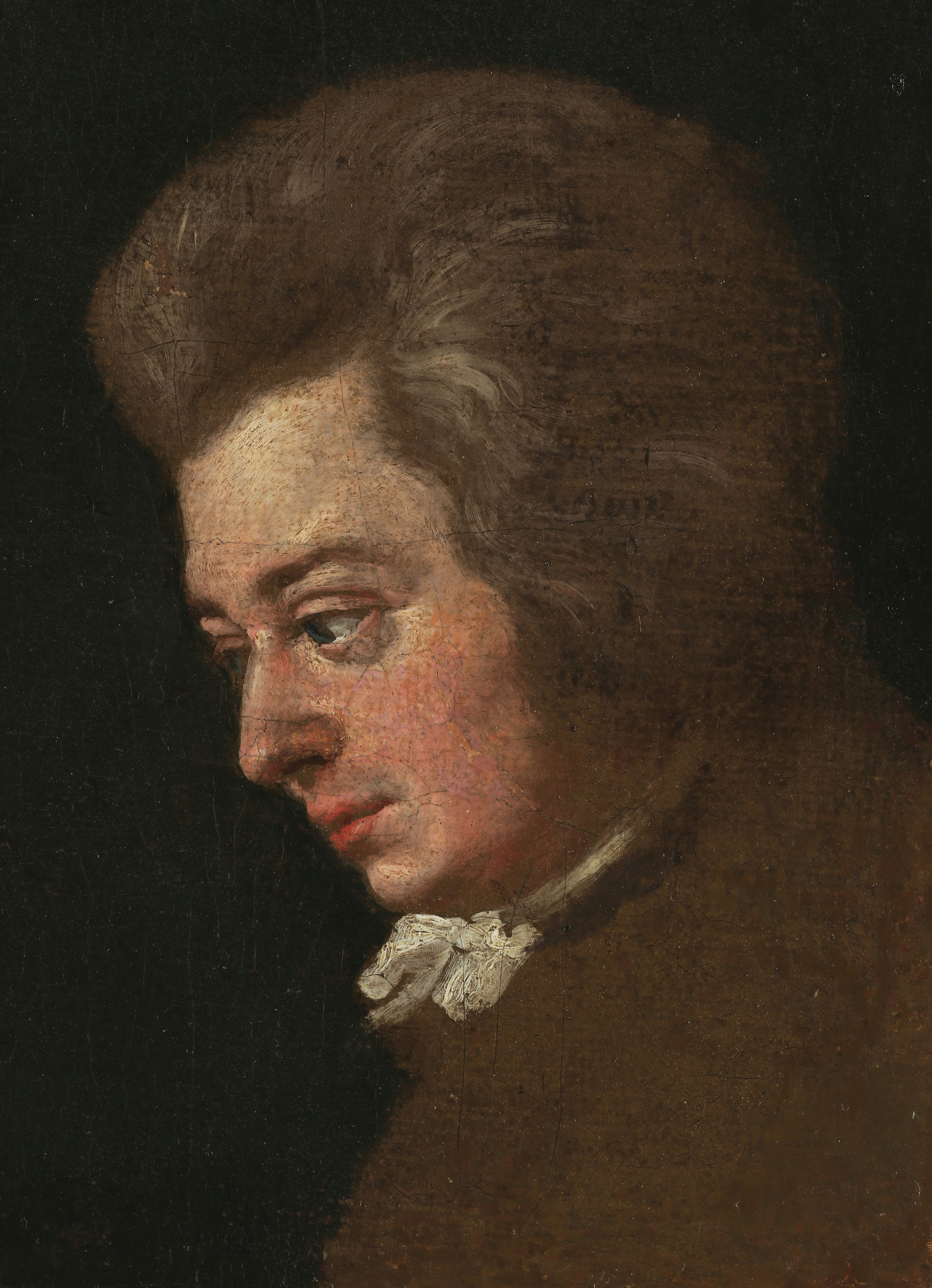
Detail of portrait of Mozart by his brother-in-law Joseph Lange

The Mozart scholar Hermann Abert offered a warm appreciation of the work: it "is one of the most important keyboard rondos ever composed. With its exotically tinged theme, it is a typically Mozartian piece in A minor, its first four bars, with their characteristic chromaticisms and dynamics, revealing an impassioned tension that is maintained through the whole movement, without ever achieving any resolution in an optimistic sense". Abert also appreciates the ways in which the two episodes are structurally related to the main theme; for instance the A major episode takes the cadential material of the main theme as its basis. (Note: Abert's discussion, originally written in the 1920s, appears in his 2007 publication.)

Robert Levin hears the work as despairing: "More than any other solo work it seems forlorn, dejected; its fundamental bleakness drags against the articulateness of the ornamentation, which struggles with increasing intensity against a manifestly hopeless fate." Richard Wigmore takes the despair theme a step further, following a longstanding tradition in Mozart biography.Keefe (2017), pp. 451–452 "With a Classical composer it is always dangerous to hear music as autobiography. But we do know that Mozart suffered a brief illness in the early spring of 1787, and that his popularity as a composer-virtuoso was on the wane. So perhaps it is not being over-fanciful to link the depressive, almost morbid tone of the Rondo ... to Mozart’s physical and emotional state."

Vladimir Horowitz disagreed with the "despair" interpretation and cautioned in particular against letting it lead to dragging the tempo in performance. His remarks on the work were recorded by David Dubal: "People today think that slow playing means profound ... [Horowitz approached the piano and continued.] ... Here is how they play the Mozart Rondo in A minor. It goes on for eleven minutes with some pianists. They think that because it is in a minor key, that it must be Mozart at his most serious. But listen to how it needs to move. [He illustrates.] There are dance elements, too, in this rondo. It can't be academic. It is not really sad. It is pensive." (Note: The work has been recorded many times by established pianists and multiple recordings can be accessed from music streaming services. Horowitz is correct in asserting that performance times occasionally exceed 11 minutes. His own recording (made for Deutsche Grammophon in 1988–1989) is on the brisk side among the range of tempos on offer.)

== Influence ==
The moody chromaticism of the work has reminded many listeners of the (decades later) piano music of Frédéric Chopin. Mitchell speculates a possible specific case of influence: "Chopin revered Mozart ...and this reverence influenced his own pianistic textures. (It is unthinkable, for example, that Chopin could have written his A minor mazurka, opus 17, no. 4, had he not known Mozart's rondo, K. 511.)"

== Notes and references ==
=== Sources ===
- Abert, Hermann (2007) [1921]. W. A. Mozart. Translated by Spencer, Stewart (revised ed.). New Haven: Yale University Press. Updated with new footnotes by Cliff Eisen.
- Edge, Dexter (2001). Mozart's Viennese copyists (Ph.D. dissertation). University of Southern California.
- Keefe, Simon P. (2017). Mozart in Vienna: The Final Decade. Cambridge: Cambridge University Press.
- Scheideler, Ullrich [in German] (2009). Mozart: Rondo A-moll KV 511 (With editorial preface and notes on sources). Munich: G. Henle Verlag. HN 54, ISMN 979-0-2018-0054-7. "Preface", "Comments" (in German and English)
