= Katarzyna Popowa-Zydroń =

Polish pianist of Bulgarian descent (born 1948)

- Екатерина Попова
- Born: 30 April 1948 (age 78); Sofia, Bulgaria
- Education: Academy of Music in Poznań; Academy of Music in Gdańsk; University of Music and Performing Arts Vienna
- Occupations: Classical pianist; Music educator
- Known for: Chair of the jury of the 17th and 18th International Chopin Piano Competitions
- Awards: Officer's Cross of the Order of Polonia Restituta (2005); Silver Medal for Merit to Culture – Gloria Artis (2005); Medal of the Commission of National Education (2004)
- Musical career
- Genre: Classical
- Instrument: Piano

Katarzyna Popowa-Zydroń (Bulgarian: Екатерина Попова) (born 30 April 1948 in Sofia) is a Polish pianist of Bulgarian descent.

She studied at the Poznań Music Academy, then graduated with honours from the State High School of Music (Academy of Music) in Gdańsk, in Professor Zbigniew Sliwinski's class, in 1973. She completed her postgraduate studies in the Hochschule für Musik und darstellende Kunst in Vienna, in Professor Alexander Jenner's class.

She was a prizewinner of the Polish Competitions: 4th Polish Festival of Young Musicians, 2nd Polish Competition of Piano Music; obtained an honorable mention at the IX International Chopin Piano Competition in Warsaw in 1975, and entered the semifinals of the Piano Competition in Terni, Italy, 1975, and of the ARD Piano Competition in Munich in 1978.

Popowa-Zydroń gave concerts in Polish philharmonic halls as well as in Germany, the Czech Republic, Russia, Bulgaria, Austria and Japan.

She was employed as a visiting professor at Kitakyūshū Music Academy in Fukuoka Prefecture.

She was member of the jury of the 16th International Chopin Piano Competition and Head of Jury of the 17th Competition in 2015 and 18th Competition in 2021.

She obtained an honourable mention at the 1975 Fryderyk Chopin International Piano Competition. Rafał Blechacz's teacher, Popowa-Zydroń is best known for her work as a pedagogue. She also chaired the jury of the 17th and 18th International Chopin Piano Competition. She has been decorated by the Medal of the Commission of National Education (2004), Silver Medal for Merit to Culture – Gloria Artis (2005) and the Order of Polonia Restituta's Officer's Cross (2005).

She is a professor of piano at the Academy of Music in Gdańsk and in Bydgoszcz.
