= Charles Richard-Hamelin =

Canadian concert pianist from Quebec

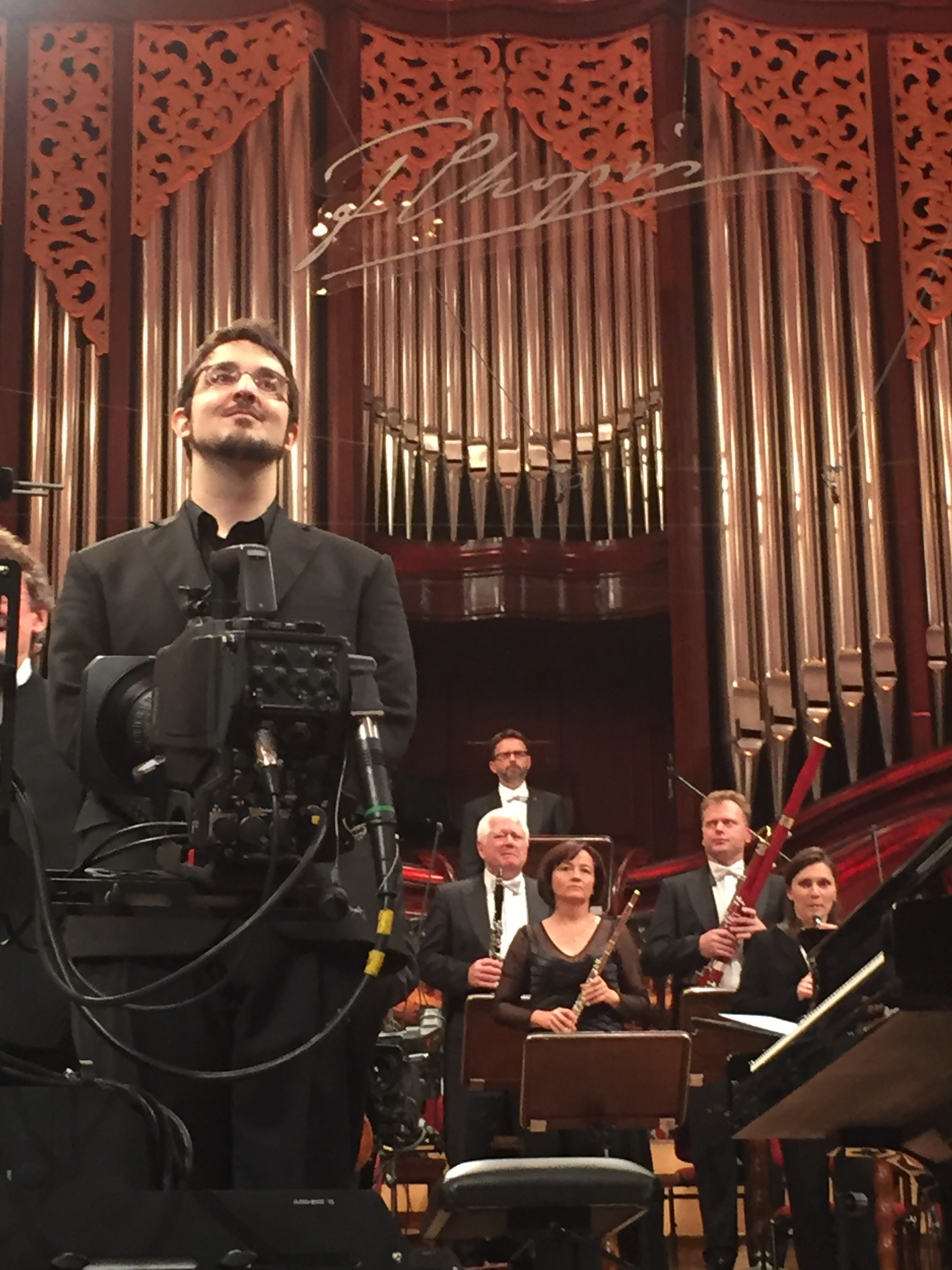

Background information
- Born: July 17, 1989 (age 37); Lanaudière, Québec
- Instrument: Piano
- Label: Analekta
- Website: www.charlesrichardhamelin.com

Charles Richard-Hamelin (born 17 July 1989) is a Canadian concert pianist from Joliette, Québec.

== Early life and education ==
Richard-Hamelin was born in Lanaudière, Quebec, and took his first piano lessons with his father. He studied at McGill University, where he received his bachelor's degree in 2011. He completed his master's degree at the Yale School of Music in 2013.

== Career ==
In 2014, Richard-Hamelin won second prize at the Montreal International Musical Competition and third prize at the Seoul International Music Competition in South Korea. The next year, he participated in the XVII International Chopin Piano Competition (Warsaw, 2015), where he received the silver medal and the Krystian Zimerman Prize for the best performance of a sonata. He also received the most prize money in the competition.

Richard-Hamelin then toured across Canada, mainly performing works by Chopin. The Fryderyk Chopin Institute later released a two-disc album of his audition performances for the competition. He also completed three concert tours in Japan.

In 2016 he received the Choquette-Symcox Award, conferred by the JM Canada Foundation and Jeunesses Musicales Canada, accompanied by a $5,000 excellence scholarship, and participated in a Jeunesses Musicales Canada tour in Quebec and Ontario.

In 2018 Richard-Hamelin and Andrew Wan released an album, Beethoven: Violin Sonatas Nos. 6, 7 & 8; in 2019 it was nominated for a Juno Award for Classical Album of the Year. In February 2019, Richard-Hamelin gave a solo performance at Koerner Hall in Toronto, which was recorded by CBC Radio 2.
