= Adam Harasiewicz =

Polish pianist

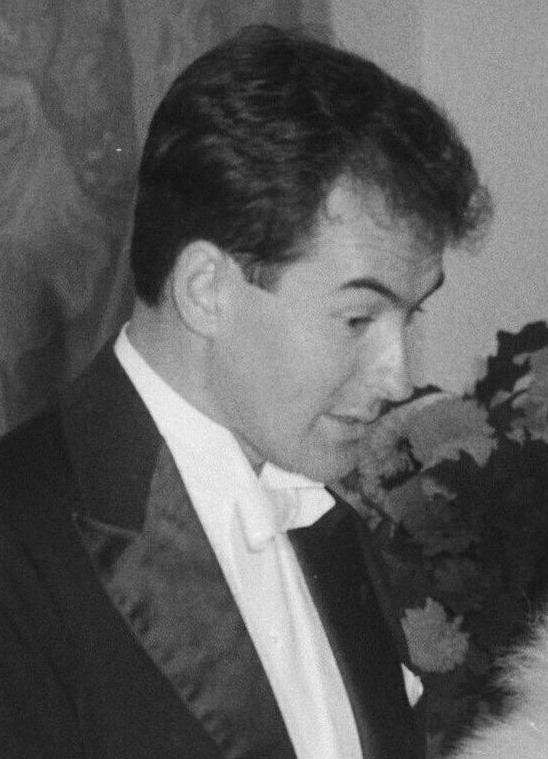
- Harasiewicz in the Netherlands in 1963

Background information
- Born: 1 July 1932 (age 93); Chodziez, Poland
- Genres: Classical
- Occupation: Pianist

Adam Harasiewicz (born 1 July 1932) is a Polish classical concert pianist.

== Biography ==
Harasiewicz was born in Chodziez. After studying violin for two months, at the age of 10 he began piano study, and at age 15 he obtained first prize in a contest at Rzeszów. At 18 he entered the State Higher School of Music in Kraków (at present Academy of Music in Kraków) where he studied with Zbigniew Drzewiecki.

Harasiewicz studied with Drzewiecki for six years, and became pre-eminent as an interpreter of Chopin, excelling through a combination of superb technique, lyrical imagination, exceptional consistency of stylistic and idiomatic approach, and (through all of these) in playing of a characteristic temperament which identifies him as a true exponent of the Polish Romantic tradition. He won the first prize at the V International Chopin Piano Competition in 1955. He then spent some years in Belgium, before settling in Austria. Harasiewicz was a member of the jury at the International Chopin Piano Competition in 1995, 2010, 2015, and 2021.

He has recorded the complete works of Chopin and also much by Szymanowski.
