= Seong-Jin Cho =

South Korean pianist (born 1994)

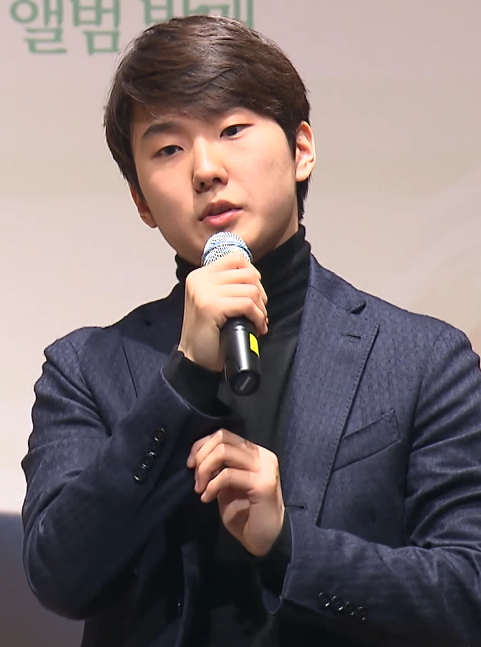
- Cho in 2016

Background information
- Born: 28 May 1994 (age 32); Seoul, South Korea
- Genre: Classical
- Occupation: Musician
- Instrument: Piano
- Years active: 2006–present
- Label: Deutsche Grammophon
- Awards: (gold) 1st Prize, International Chopin Piano Competition (2015)
- Website: seongjin-cho.com

Korean name
- Hangul: 조성진
- RR: Jo Seongjin
- MR: Cho Sŏngjin

Seong-Jin Cho (Korean: 조성진; born 28 May 1994) is a South Korean concert pianist. He was the winner of the 2015 International Chopin Piano Competition, the first from South Korea. Since then, he has regularly performed recital programs in major venues and with the world's foremost orchestras as a soloist.

Cho signed with Deutsche Grammophon in 2016, under which he has released seven studio albums and one live recording. He was the Artist in Residence of the Berlin Philharmonic for the 2024–25 season.

== Early life and education ==
Cho was born in Seoul, South Korea, the only child of non-musical parents; his father was an engineer. At six years old, he began studying both the piano and the violin. Though he appeared to have more natural facility on the latter, he developed a stronger liking for the piano, and gave his first public piano recital at age eleven. After being identified through a musical prodigy development program at the Seoul Arts Center, he began studying under Sook-Ryeon Park at Sunchon National University and Soo-Jung Shin at Seoul National University.

He attended the Yewon School, a private middle school for art education, during which he won First Prize at both the Moscow International Fryderyk Chopin Competition for Young Pianists (2008) and the Hamamatsu International Piano Competition (2009). Cho then attended Seoul Arts High School for two years, during which he placed third at the 2011 International Tchaikovsky Competition and began performing regularly with Myung-whun Chung and the Seoul Philharmonic Orchestra.

Cho moved to Paris in 2012 to study at the Conservatoire de Paris with Michel Béroff. While there, Cho placed third at the 2014 Arthur Rubinstein International Piano Master Competition and first prize at the 2015 International Chopin Piano Competition, becoming the first Korean to receive that distinction.

== Career ==
Cho regularly tours the world to perform with orchestras or in solo. He generally performs more than 100 concerts yearly with a schedule pre-booked three years ahead. As a soloist, Cho frequently works with various European orchestras - including the Berliner Philharmoniker, Vienna Philharmonic, Royal Concertgebouw Orchestra, Czech Philharmonic, Orchestre de Paris, Philharmonia Orchestra, London Symphony Orchestra and London Philharmonic Orchestra - and North American orchestras such as the New York Philharmonic, Boston Symphony, Chicago Symphony, Philadelphia and Cleveland. He has collaborated with conductors such as Lorin Maazel, Simon Rattle, Kirill Petrenko, Vladimir Ashkenazy, Semyon Bychkov, Jakub Hrůša, Myung-Whun Chung, Gustavo Dudamel, Valery Gergiev, Vasily Petrenko, Mikhail Pletnev, Esa-Pekka Salonen, Yuri Temirkanov, Gianandrea Noseda, Yannick Nézet-Séguin and Andris Nelsons.

Cho has performed at various venues, notably the Stern Auditorium of Carnegie Hall, Berliner Philharmonie, Musikverein, Concertgebouw Amsterdam, Rudolfinum in Prague, Prinzregententheater München, Wiener Konzerthaus, Wigmore Hall in London and Suntory Hall Tokyo. He has also been invited to numerous music festivals such as the Verbier Festival, Menuhin Festival Gstaad, Rheingau Musik Festival, BBC Proms, Tanglewood Festival, Salzburg Festival, Edinburg Festival and Lucerne Festival.

In 2017, Cho made his debut with the Berliner Philharmoniker under Simon Rattle to perform Ravel's Piano Concerto in G.

In 2021, Cho gave the world premiere of Allegro in D, a newly found Mozart work.

In 2022, Cho debuted with the Vienna Philharmonic, as a replacement for Denis Matsuev, with Yannick Neget-Seguin. Cho performed the Rachmaninoff Piano Concerto No. 2, and in October 2024 collaborated with the orchestra on performances of Beethoven's Piano Concerto No. 3.

Cho was 2024–25 Artist in Residence of the Berlin Philharmonic Orchestra performing the Shostakovich Piano Concerto No. 1, Beethoven Piano Concerto No. 5 and chamber music with members of the orchestra.

The London Symphony Orchestra selected Cho as Artist Portrait of the 2025/26 season., featuring him in a series of concerts and activities with the LSO including Chopin's Piano Concerto No. 2, Prokofiev's Piano Concerto No. 2, chamber music and recitals.

== Reception of his work ==
The Chicago Tribune noted on Cho's 2025 performance of Prokofiev's Piano Concerto No.2: "He pulled a silvery, bladelike sound from the Orchestra Hall Steinway — skillful in itself, as the piano's default tends towards the ripe and full." On his 2025 Carnegie Hall recital with a program of Ravel's complete works for piano solo, Susan Stempleski of Bachtrack noted: "Hearing Cho, with his impeccable technique and acute musical sensitivity, play the whole of this magnificent repertoire over the course of a single evening, deepened one's appreciation of the beauty and originality of Ravel's pianistic oeuvre." Joshua Barone, reviewing the same concert for The New York Times, wrote, "Cho is a pianist of extraordinary precision and shading. He almost never misses a note, and sounds as if he could assign a different weight to each finger. But in Ravel's solo works, which across decades of composition contain both the evocative broad strokes of impressionism and the luminous specificity of pointillism, his approach can have mixed results." Classics Today's David Hurwitz called Cho's recordings of Ravel on Deutsche Grammophon "lovely but too fussy," and summarized his overall impression with, "Nice playing, a touch micro-managed, and hardly the best in this repertoire."

On his BBC Proms performance of Beethoven's Piano Concerto No. 4, The Guardian reviewed: "Cho's acclaimed virtuosity was clear, his passagework gleamingly precise, his sound ranging from staggering softness to luminous Steinway shine." Bachtrack reviewer Chris Garlick commented on Cho's Schumann's Symphonic Études: "Cho revelled in the charm and endless variety of textures and dancelike rhythms, rising to the occasion at every turn, an inspired performance of a work that demands nothing less." Cho has been described as a "poet on the keyboard" by Sir Simon Rattle.

== Personal life ==
After the Chopin Competition in 2011, Cho met Krystian Zimerman in Tokyo who toured him around the city. Zimerman has provided career advice to Cho since then. Cho's first classical album that he purchased as a child was Zimerman's recording of Chopin's Four Ballades. Cho idolised Radu Lupu, as he revealed in an interview, and when they met in Paris during a dinner party, they became close and Cho was invited to Lupu's house in Lausanne several times.

Cho moved to Berlin in 2018 after briefly visiting the city for business. He was attracted by the city's cosmopolitan culture and many beautiful parks in the city. Cho considers music more of a passion than a job and enjoys performing while he tries to expand his repertoire by adding at least two new piano concertos and a one-year recital program worth of solo piano pieces each year. Since he was in the 7th grade, Cho has really admired Mahler's symphonies.

== Awards ==
- 2008: International Fryderyk Chopin Competition for Young Pianists – First Prize
- 2009: Hamamatsu International Piano Competition – First Prize
- 2011: International Tchaikovsky Competition (piano) – Third Prize
- 2014: Arthur Rubinstein International Piano Master Competition – Third Prize
- 2015: XVII International Chopin Piano Competition – First Prize
- 2023: Samsung Ho-Am Prize in the Arts
- 2025: Opus Klassik, Instrumentalist of the Year

== Discography ==
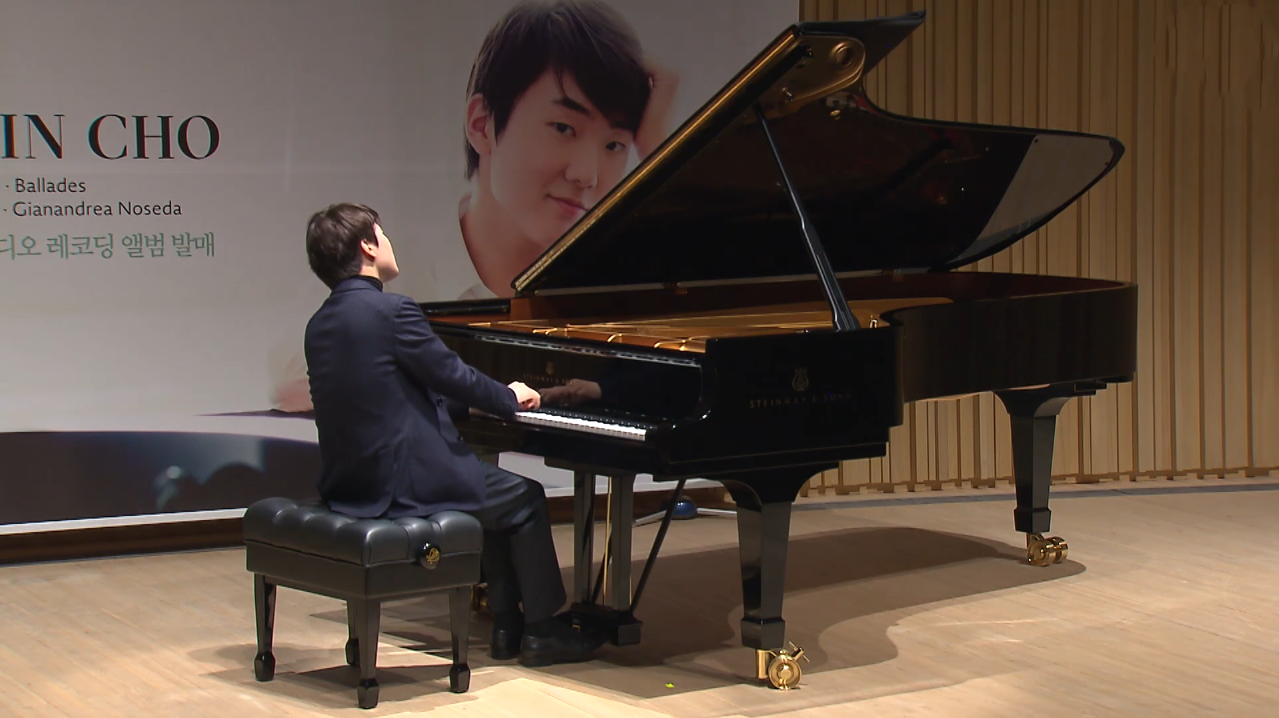

Seong-Jin Cho's first album was his Chopin Piano Competition-winning performance released as a live recording immediately after the conclusion of the competition:

1. Winner of the 17th International Chopin Piano Competition Warsaw 2015, Seong-Jin Cho, Deutsche Grammophon, 6 November 2015

In 2016, Cho signed a recording contract with Deutsche Grammophon and released eight studio albums:

1. Chopin: Piano Concerto No. 1 & Ballades, Seong-Jin Cho with the London Symphony Orchestra & Gianandrea Noseda, Deutsche Grammophon, 25 November 2016
2. Debussy: Images / Children's Corner / Suite Bergamasque, Seong-Jin Cho, Deutsche Grammophon, 17 November 2017
3. Mozart: Piano Concerto No. 20, K. 466; Piano Sonatas, K. 281 and 332, Seong-Jin Cho with the Chamber Orchestra of Europe & Yannick Nézet-Séguin, Deutsche Grammophon, 16 November 2018
4. The Wanderer: Schubert, Berg, Liszt, Seong-Jin Cho, Deutsche Grammophon, 8 May 2020
5. Chopin: Piano Concerto No. 2 · Scherzi, Seong-Jin Cho with the London Symphony Orchestra & Gianandrea Noseda, Deutsche Grammophon, 27 August 2021
6. The Handel Project: Handel-Suites & Brahms-Variations, Seong-Jin Cho, Deutsche Grammophon, 23 February 2023
7. Ravel: The Complete Solo Piano Works, Seong-Jin Cho, Deutsche Grammophon, 17 January 2025
8. Ravel: The Piano Concertos, Seong-Jin Cho with the Boston Symphony Orchestra & Andris Nelsons, Deutsche Grammophon, 21 February 2025

In addition, Cho recorded Mozart's newly-found work, collaborating with Matthias Goerne for a song album and releasing six digital singles:

1. Schubert: 6 Moments musicaux, Op. 94, D. 780, III. Allegro moderato, Seong-Jin Cho, Deutsche Grammophon, 21 August 2020
2. Mozart: Allegro in D major, K 626b/16, Seong-Jin Cho, Deutsche Grammophon, 29 January 2021
3. Im Abendrot (at Sunset) – Songs by Wagner, Pfitzner, Strauss, Matthias Goerne and Seong-Jin Cho, Deutsche Grammophon, 16 April 2021
4. Liszt: Consolations, S. 172: No. 3 Lento placido in D-flat major, Seong-Jin Cho, Deutsche Grammophon, 30 April 2021
5. Schubert: Der Wanderer, D. 489, Matthias Goerne and Seong-Jin Cho, Deutsche Grammophon, 28 May 2021
6. Brahms: 6 Pieces for Piano, Op. 118: VI. Intermezzo in E Flat Minor. Andante, largo e mesto, Seong-Jin Cho, Deutsche Grammophon, 25 February 2022
