= Kate Liu =

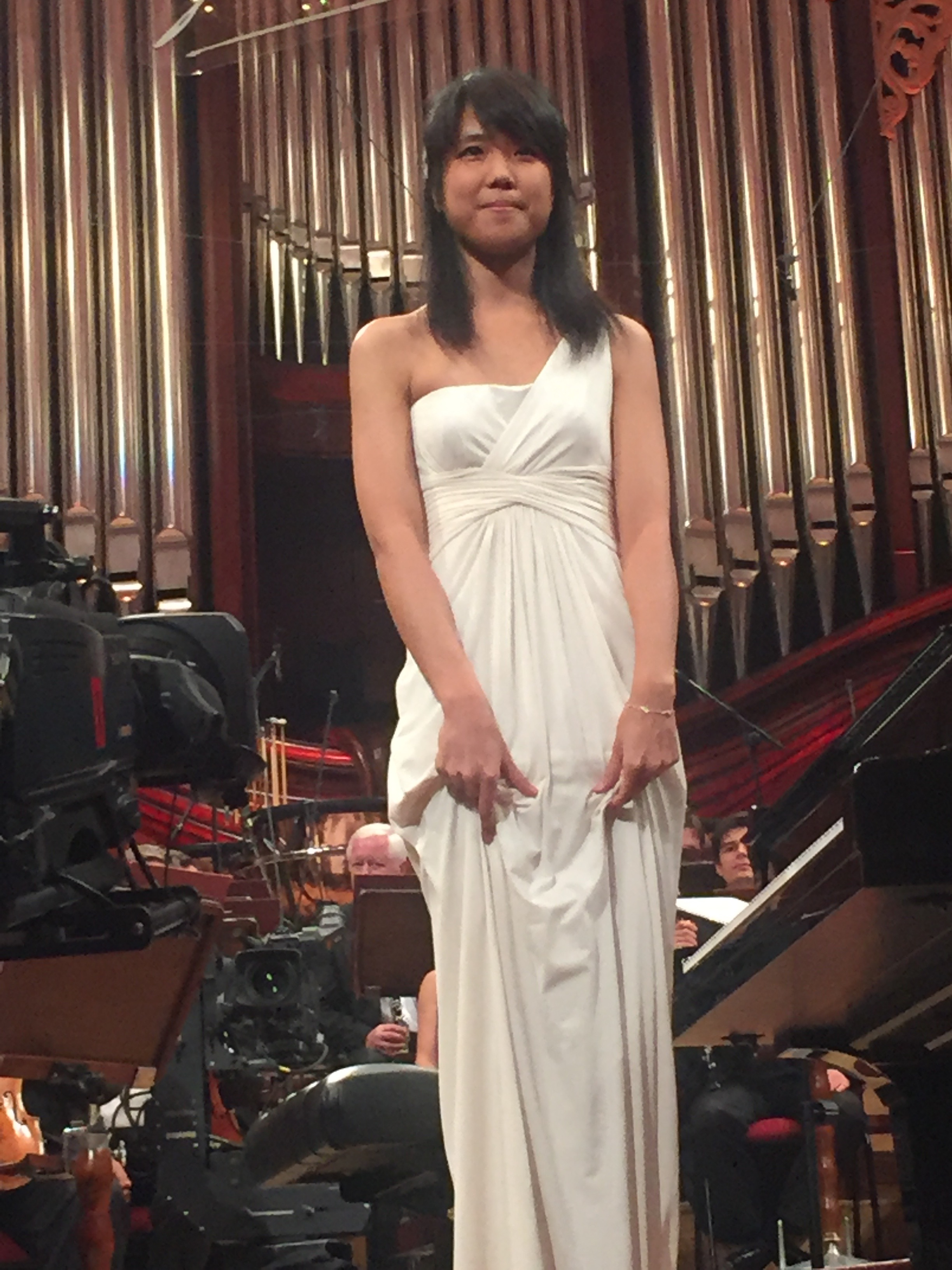

Background information
- Born: May 23, 1994 (age 32); Singapore
- Genres: Classical
- Occupation: Pianist
- Instrument: Piano
- Website: kateliu.com

Chinese name
- Simplified Chinese: 刘珒
Transcriptions
Standard Mandarin
- Hanyu Pinyin: Liú jīn

Kate Liu (born May 23, 1994 in Singapore) is an American classical pianist. On October 20, 2015, she won the third prize and the Polish Radio Award for the best performance of mazurkas in the 17th International Fryderyk Chopin Piano Competition.

== Biography ==
Liu began playing piano at age four. At six, she was admitted to the gifted music program of the Yamaha Music School in Singapore. When she was eight, she moved with her family to the Chicago area, United States. In Chicago, she studied piano with Alan Chow, Micah Yui and Emilio del Rosario in the Academy program for talented young pianists and string players at the Music Institute of Chicago. She graduated from New Trier High School in 2012 and received her Bachelor of Music degree from the Curtis Institute of Music. While studying at Curtis, she was named a 2018-19 Gilmore Rising Star. She is pursuing her graduate degree at the Juilliard School, where she studies with Robert McDonald and Yoheved Kaplinsky.

As a soloist, Liu has performed in many major venues, including the Seoul Arts Center, Tokyo Metropolitan Theatre, Carnegie's Weill Hall, Severance Hall in Cleveland, La Maison Symphonique de Montréal, Warsaw National Philharmonic, Kennedy Center in Washington, D.C., Shanghai Concert Hall, Osaka Symphony Hall, Polish National Radio Symphony Orchestra Hall, the Phillips Collection, and so on. She has collaborated with the Cleveland Orchestra, Warsaw Philharmonic Orchestra, Orchestre Symphonique de Montréal, Polish Radio Orchestra, Poznan Philharmonic, Yomiuri Nippon Symphony Orchestra, Daegu Symphony Orchestra, Rochester Philharmonic, Hilton Head Symphony Orchestra, and Evanston Symphony Orchestra.

== Accolades ==
- 2010: New York International Piano Competition in New York City, USA – 1st prize
- 2010: Thomas & Evon Cooper International Competition in Oberlin, USA – 3rd prize
- 2011: Hilton Head International Piano Competition for Young Artists in Hilton Head, USA - 6th prize
- 2012: Eastman Young Artist International Piano Competition in Rochester, USA – 3rd prize
- 2014: Montreal International Musical Competition in Montreal, Canada - finalist
- 2015: The 3rd Asia-Pacific International Chopin Competition in Daegu, South Korea – 1st prize
- 2015: 17th International Fryderyk Chopin Piano Competition in Warsaw, Poland – 3rd prize (bronze medal) and the special prize by the Polish Radio for the best performance of Mazurkas
- 2022: Quarterfinalist, Sixteenth Van Cliburn International Piano Competition
- 2024: Semifinalist, Sixteenth Concours Géza Anda in Zürich, Switzerland
