= Michel Béroff =

French pianist and conductor

Michel Béroff (born 9 May 1950) is a French pianist and conductor of Bulgarian origin.

== Background and education ==
Béroff was born at Épinal, and trained at the Nancy Conservatory, winning the 1st prize in 1962 and the prize of excellence in 1963. He completed his studies at the Paris Conservatory with Pierre Sancan, winning the 1st prize in 1966.

== Career ==
In 1967 he made his Paris debut and won 1st prize in the Messiaen competition in Royan. Thereafter he toured extensively internationally and performed with most of the major orchestras and as a recitalist.

He has recorded extensively for EMI in works by Liszt, Prokofiev, Stravinsky, J.S. Bach, Debussy, Bartók and Messiaen.

He has also turned to conducting.

== Notable students ==
- Seong-Jin Cho

== Bibliography ==
- Baker's Biographical Dictionary of 20th Century Classical Musicians, N. Slonimsky, Schirmer Books, 1997
