= 2015 Leeds International Piano Competition =

The 2015 Leeds International Piano Competition was the 18th edition of the tournament, and it was held in the University of Leeds and the Leeds Town Hall from 26 August to 13 September 2015, with the Hallé Orchestra acting in the final conducted by Mark Elder. Russian pianist Anna Tsybuleva won the competition.

== Jury ==
- (United Kingdom) Fanny Waterman (chairman)
- (Russia) Nikolai Demidenko
- (France) Pascal Devoyon
- (United Kingdom) Danny Evans
- (United Kingdom) Adam Gatehouse
- (South Korea) Han Tong-il
- (United States) Jerome Lowenthal
- (United States) Robert McDonald
- (Cyprus) Marios Papadopoulos
- (Russia) Boris Petrushansky
- (France) Anne Queffélec
- (China) Eleanor Wong

== Results ==
Competitor	R1	R2	SF	F
(Russia) Anna Tsybuleva				1st
(South Korea) Heejae Kim				2nd
(Ukraine) Vitaly Pisarenko				3rd
(United States) Drew Petersen				4th
(Japan) Tomoki Kitamura				5th
(China) Wei Yun				6th
(United Kingdom) Ashley Fripp				
(South Korea) Hong Hi-hwang				
(Russia) Alexander Panfilov				
(Italy) Shizuka Susanna Salvemini				
(Taiwan) Szuyu Rachel Su				
(China) Sun Jun				
(United Kingdom) Jamie Bergin				
(South Korea) Cho Jun-hwi				
(Germany) Kiveli Dörken				
(Italy) Giuseppe Guarerra				
(South Korea) Huh Jae-weon				
(Japan) Daiki Kato				
(Hungary) Daniel Lebhardt				
(South Korea) Lee Taek-gi				
(Italy) Rodolfo Leone				
(China) Li Zhenni				
(Japan) Yuka Morishige				
(South Korea) Park Joo-hyeon				
(Italy) Costanza Principe				
(South Korea) Shin Chang-yong				
(Russia) Arseny Tarasevich-Nikolaev				
(South Korea) Won Jae-yeon				
(United Kingdom) Yang Yuanfan				
(Japan) Masaru Yoshitake				
(Romania) Alina Bercu				
(Russia) Anna Bulkina				
(Taiwan) Jenny Chen				
(South Korea) Cho Jun				
(Romania) Daniel Ciobanu				
(United States) Lindsay Garritson				
(Japan) Eriko Gomita				
(China) Guang Chen				
(United States) Julia Hamos				
(Georgia (country)) Shalva Khotenashvili				
(South Korea) Kim Myung-hyun				
(South Korea) Kim Yoon-ji				
(South Korea) Lim Hyun-jin				
(China) Lin Peng				
(Japan) Mizuho Nakada				
(Israel) Adi Neuhaus				
(Japan) Nariya Nogi				
(South Korea) Oh Yeon-taek				
(Japan) Kana Okada				
(France) Célia Oneto Bensaid				
(South Korea) Park Hyo-eun				
(Belgium) Stephanie Proot				
(Romania) Mihai Ritivoiu				
(Uzbekistan) Tamila Salimdjanova				
(Russia) Nikolai Saratovsky				
(Taiwan) Shen Mengsheng				
(South Korea) Song Jeung-beum				
(Thailand) Nattapol Tantikarn				
(China) Wang Chun				
(Hong Kong) Wong Chiyan				
(China) Wu Chuyong				
(China) Wu Zhenyi				
(South Korea) Yong Chang				
(South Korea) Yoon Joon				

== Reactions ==
Andrew Clements from The Guardian found that while Tcybuleva's playing in the final was fluent:

"...she often seemed incapable of seeing the overall shape of the work [Brahms' 2nd Concerto], and her role in projecting it."

Clements further commented that "only Petersen and Kim gave any sense that they chose music they genuinely loved" (Rachmaninov's 1st and Beethoven's 4th respectively), while describing Pisarenko as "another pianist with steely technique and limited musical imagination in the current Russian mould."
