= Leeds International Piano Competition =

Piano competition in Leeds, England every 3 years

- Artistic Director Sir Stephen Hough
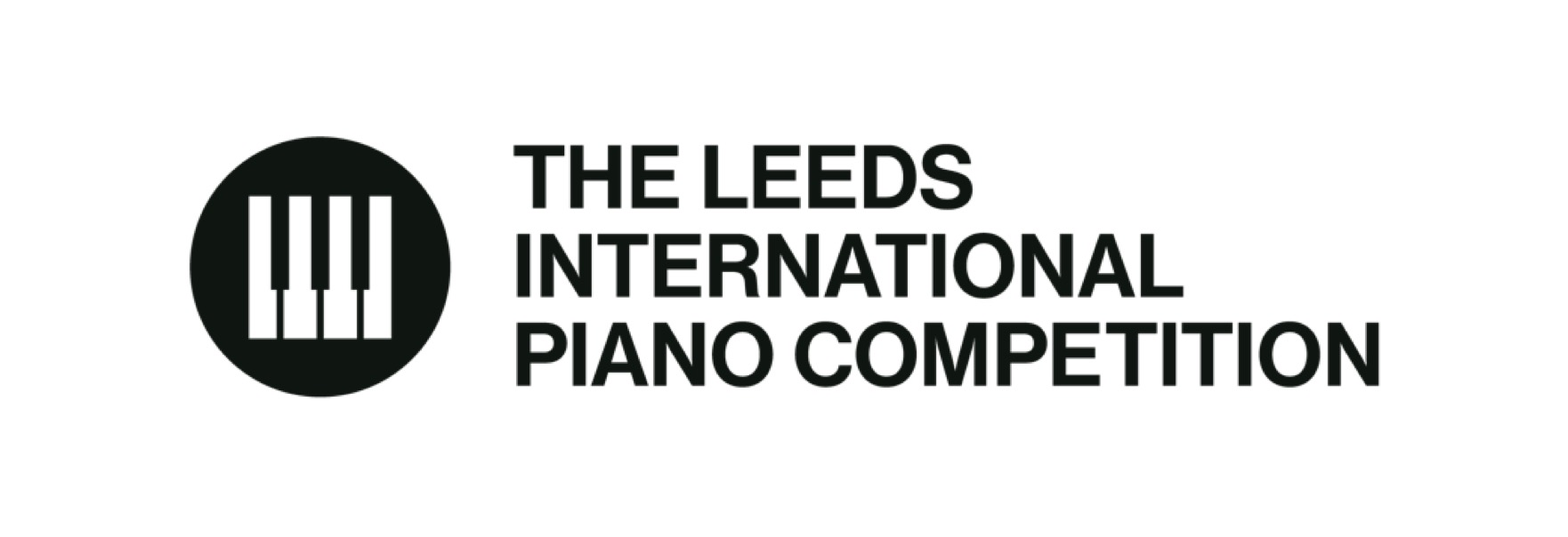
- Awarded for: Exceptional piano performance
- Location: Great Hall of the University of Leeds; Leeds Town Hall
- Country: United Kingdom
- Presented by: Leeds International Piano Competition
- Formerly called: Leeds International Pianoforte Competition
- First award: 1963; 63 years ago
- Final award: 2024
- Website: www.leedspiano.com

The Leeds International Piano Competition, informally known as The Leeds and formerly the Leeds International Pianoforte Competition, is an international piano competition which takes place every three years in Leeds, West Yorkshire, England. It was founded in 1961 by Marion, Countess of Harewood, Dame Fanny Waterman, Dr Geoffrey de Keyser and Roslyn Lyons, with the first competition being held in 1963. Its first-prize winners include Radu Lupu (1969), Murray Perahia (1972) and Eric Lu (2018), who went on to win the International Chopin Piano Competition in 2025. Mitsuko Uchida and András Schiff were among the prize-winners in 1975.

Waterman led the competition as chair and artistic director until the 2015 competition. She was succeeded by Paul Lewis and Adam Gatehouse, and from 2018 by Gatehouse as sole Artistic Director. In July 2026 Sir Stephen Hough was appointed Artistic Director and Chair of the Jury for the 2027 competition, which removed prescribed repertoire and raised the upper age limit to 35.

The First Round is held in several cities around the world. The Second Round and Semi-finals take place in the Great Hall of the University of Leeds, and the concerto finals at Leeds Town Hall. Alongside the competition, the charity runs an award-winning public pianos and community programmes in Leeds.

== History > Founding and early years (1961 to 2015) ==
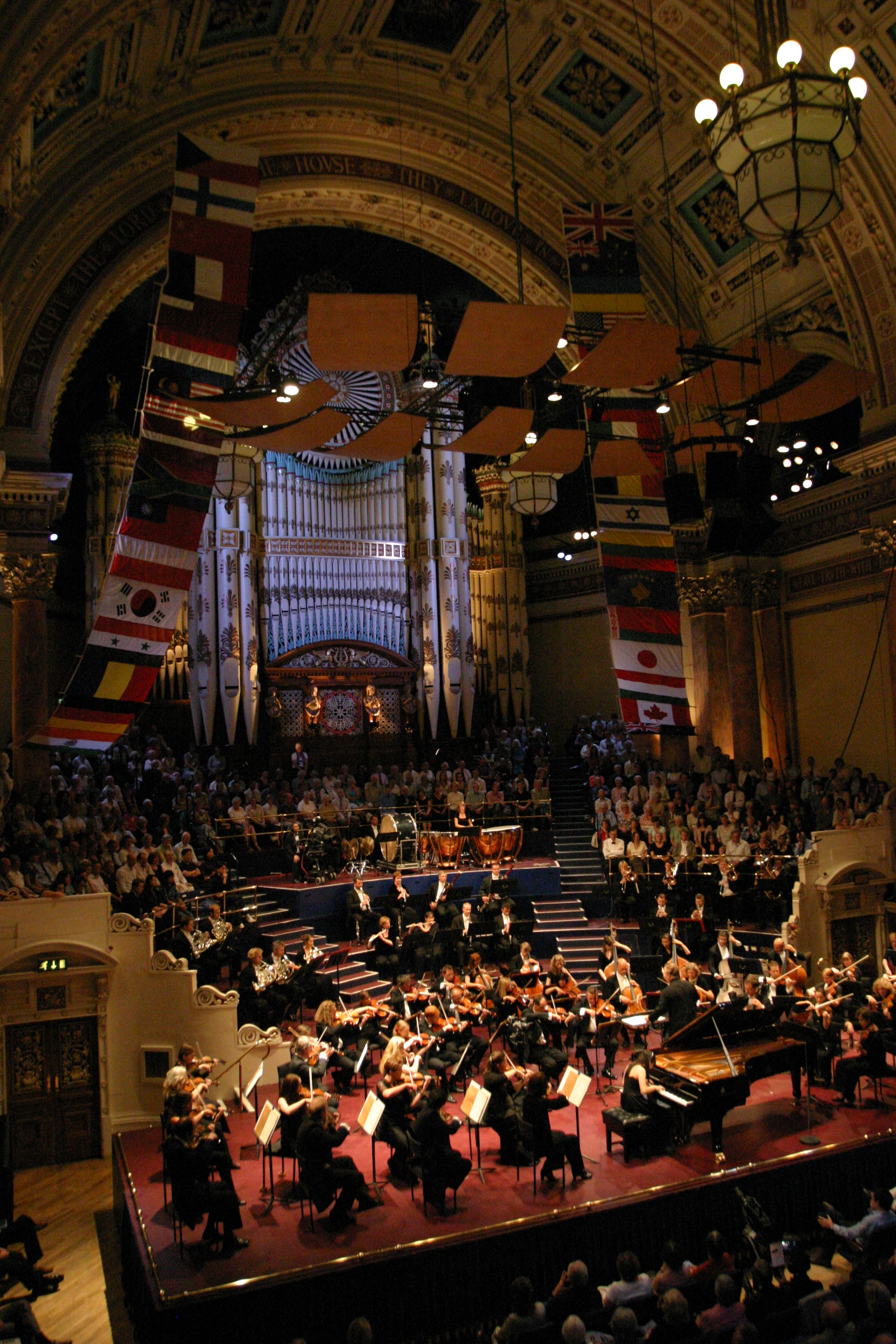
2009 competition finals

The competition was founded by the Leeds piano teacher Fanny Waterman with the pianist Marion Stein, Countess of Harewood, Dr Geoffrey de Keyser (Waterman's husband) and Roslyn Lyons. The first competition was held in September 1963 and was won by the British pianist Michael Roll. The competition joined the World Federation of International Music Competitions in 1965. The BBC has broadcast every competition on television and radio since 1966.

The University of Leeds has supported the competition since it began and is its Principal Partner.

After the 1996 competition, there was a four-year break before the 2000 competition, to align with the turn of the millennium.

Early winners included Radu Lupu (1969) and Murray Perahia (1972). Finalists who did not win first prize include Mitsuko Uchida and András Schiff (1975), Peter Donohoe (1981), Louis Lortie (1984) and Lars Vogt (1990). Sofya Gulyak became the first woman to win first prize in 2009.

Waterman retired after the 2015 competition at the age of 95. She remained Honorary Life President until her death in December 2020, aged 100.

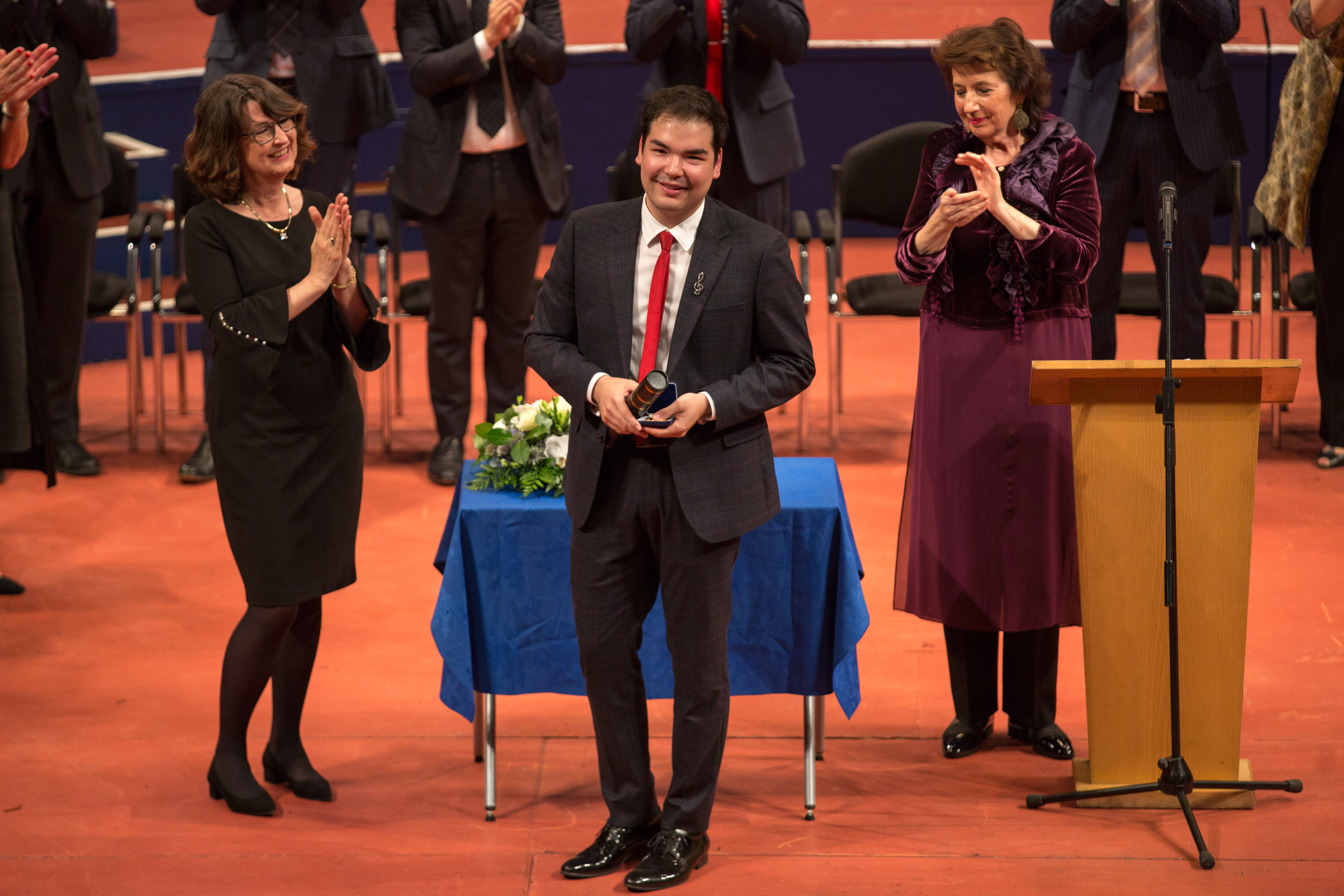
2021 winner, Alim Beisembayev receiving his Dame Fanny Waterman Gold Medal

== History > 2018 to 2024 ==
Paul Lewis and Adam Gatehouse became co-artistic directors after Waterman's retirement and announced a new format for 2018. For the first time, the preliminary round was held internationally (in Berlin, New York and Singapore). The semi-final included chamber music. The prize package was redesigned around career development and included artist management with Askonas Holt, a recording with Warner Classics and mentoring. All rounds were streamed live by medici.tv for the first time. A festival programme was also introduced, including public pianos across Leeds city centre. The 2018 competition was won by the 20-year-old American Eric Lu.

Gatehouse became sole Artistic Director in 2021, and Imogen Cooper became Chair of the Jury. Because of the COVID-19 pandemic, the 2021 First Round was held virtually, with 63 pianists recorded in 17 locations and the jury deliberating online. The Royal Liverpool Philharmonic Orchestra became the finals orchestra. Alim Beisembayev was the first winner from Kazakhstan.

The 2024 competition received 366 applications, a record at the time, and held its First Round in six cities. While Leeds Town Hall was being refurbished, the concerto finals were held at St George's Hall, Bradford. The Canadian pianist Jaeden Izik-Dzurko won first prize. Broadcasts across BBC Four, BBC Radio 3, medici.tv, Amadeus.tv, Classic FM and Mezzo.tv reached a combined audience of over 10 million views. Gatehouse announced that he would step down in spring 2025.

== History > 2027 Competition ==
On 2 July 2026 the competition announced Sir Stephen Hough as Artistic Director and Chair of the Jury for 2027. For the first time there is no prescribed repertoire at any stage, and the upper age limit was raised to 35. First prize was increased to £50,000. New awards include an Encore Prize and the Leeds Piano Trail Prize, for a community-focused project to be delivered in 2028.

Hough said that competitions "can seem like a bunch of tests where you're trying to trip up the competitors."

The jury includes Piotr Anderszewski, Lucas Debargue, Janina Fialkowska, Alexander Gavrylyuk, Orli Shaham, Yeol Eum Son, Kathryn Stott and the composer Errollyn Wallen, chaired by Hough. Applications closed in November 2026. The First Round takes place from 30 March to 6 April 2027 in London, New York, Paris, Berlin, Vienna, Beijing and Seoul. The Leeds rounds run from 8 to 18 September 2027, ending with the concerto finals at Leeds Town Hall with the Royal Liverpool Philharmonic Orchestra and Domingo Hindoyan.

== Orchestra ==
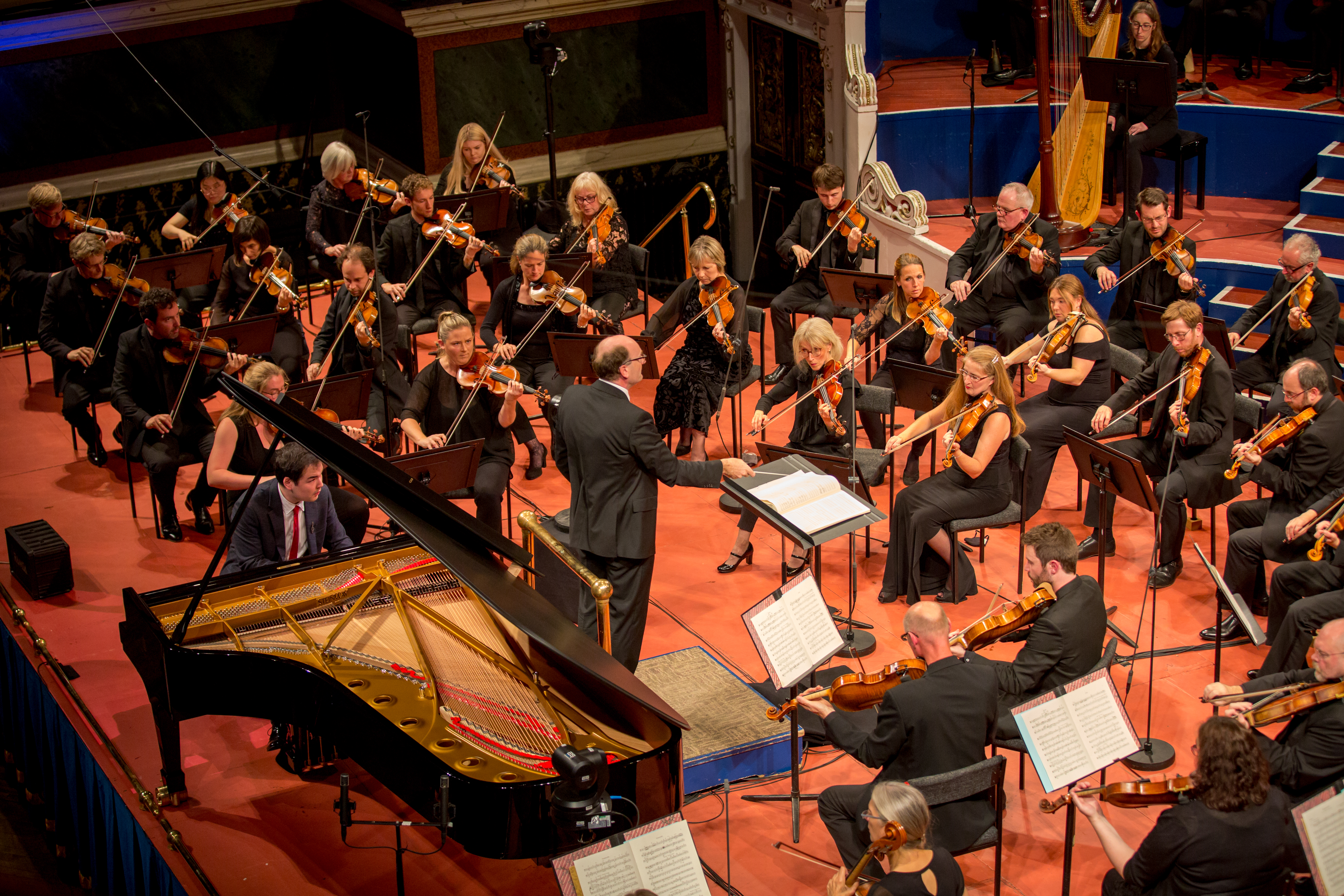
Alim Beisembayev with the Royal Liverpool Philharmonic Orchestra and Andrew Manze at Leeds Town Hall

Several major UK orchestras have accompanied the concerto finals. The Terence Judd Hallé Orchestra Prize, chosen by the orchestra, was awarded from 2012 to 2018. In 2019 the Royal Liverpool Philharmonic was announced as finals orchestra from 2021. It awards the Royal Liverpool Philharmonic Society Prize for the best performance of a contemporary work. After the 2021 winner Alim Beisembayev received this prize, the orchestra commissioned a piano concerto from Eleanor Alberga.

- Royal Liverpool Philharmonic with Sir John Pritchard and Sir Charles Groves (1963 to 1975)
- BBC Northern Symphony Orchestra, renamed as BBC Philharmonic with Norman Del Mar (1978) and Vernon Handley (1984)
- Philharmonia Orchestra with Sir Charles Groves (1981)
- City of Birmingham Symphony Orchestra with Sir Simon Rattle (1987 to 2000)
- Hallé with Sir Mark Elder (2003 to 2015) and Edward Gardner (2018)
- Royal Liverpool Philharmonic with Andrew Manze (2021) and Domingo Hindoyan (2024 and 2027)

== Prize winners ==
Year	1st place	2nd place	3rd place	4th place	5th place	6th place
2024	Jaeden Izik-Dzurko	Junyan Chen (Note: Winner of the Yaltah Menuhin Award.)	Khanh Nhi Luong	Kai-Min Chang	Julian Trevelyan	—N/a
2021	Alim Beisembayev (Note: Winner of the medici.tv Audience Award.)	Kaito Kobayashi	Ariel Lanyi	Dmytro Choni	Thomas Kelly	—N/a
2018	Eric Lu (Note: Winner of the Terence Judd–Hallé Orchestra Prize.)	Mario Häring	Xinyuan Wang	—N/a (Finalists: Aljoša Jurinić, Anna Geniushene)		
2015	Anna Tsybuleva	Heejae Kim	Vitaly Pisarenko	Drew Petersen	Tomoki Kitamura	Yun Wei
2012	Federico Colli	Louis Schwizgebel	Jiayan Sun	Andrejs Osokins	Andrew Tyson	Jayson Gillham
2009	Sofya Gulyak	Alexej Gorlatch	Alessandro Taverna	David Kadouch	Rachel Cheung	Jianing Kong
2006	Sunwook Kim	Andrew Brownell	Denis Kozhukhin	Alice Wong	Sung-hoon Kim	Grace Fong
2003	Antti Siirala	Evgenia Rubinova	Yuma Osaki	Igor Tchetuev	Chiao-Ying Chang	Sodi Braide
2000	Alessio Bax	Davide Franceschetti	Severin von Eckardstein	Cristiano Burato	Ashley Wass	Tatiana Kolesova
1996	Ilya Itin	Roberto Cominati	Aleksandar Madžar	Sa Chen	Armen Babakhanian	Ekaterina Apekisheva
1993	Ricardo Castro	Leon McCawley	Mark Anderson	Filippo Gamba	Maxim Philippov	Margarita Shevchenko
1990	Artur Pizarro	Lars Vogt	Éric Le Sage	Balázs Szokolay	Haesun Paik	Andrei Zheltonog
1987	Vladimir Ovchinnikov	Ian Munro	Noriko Ogawa	Boris Berezovsky	Hugh Tinney	Marcantonio Barone
1984	Jon Kimura Parker	Ju Hee Suh	Junko Otake	Louis Lortie	David Buechner	Emma Tahmizian
1981	Ian Hobson	Wolfgang Manz	Bernard d'Ascoli	Daniel Blumenthal	Christopher O'Riley	Peter Donohoe
1978	Michel Dalberto	Diana Kacso	Lydia Artymiw	Ian Hobson	Kathryn Stott	Etsuko Terada
1975	Dmitri Alexeev	Mitsuko Uchida	Joint 3rd prize: András Schiff; Pascal Devoyon	Joint 4th prize: Michael Houstoun; Myung-whun Chung	—N/a	
1972	Murray Perahia	Craig Sheppard	Eugen Indjic	—N/a		
1969	Radu Lupu	Georges Pludermacher	Arthur Moreira Lima	Boris Petrushansky	Anne Queffélec	—N/a
1966	Rafael Orozco	Joint 2nd prize: Viktoria Postnikova; Semyon Kruchin	Alexey Nasedkin	Jean-Rodolphe Kars	—N/a	
1963	Michael Roll	Vladimir Krainev	Sebastien Risler	Armenta Adams	—N/a	

== Popular culture ==
Author Jilly Cooper visited the competition during research for her novel Appassionata; it features a similar event, also in Yorkshire, called the Appleton Piano Competition.

== See also ==
- List of classical music competitions
