= Isang Yun Competition =

International music competition

- Genre: Classical music
- Locations: Tongyeong, South Korea
- Years active: 2003–present
- Website: Official website

The ISANGYUN Competition is an international music competition, held annually in Tongyeong, South Korea. It commemorates Isang Yun (1917–1995), a Korean composer who was born in Tongyeong and later settled in Germany. The competition was established in 2003 as the Gyeongnam International Music Competition, and renamed to ISANGYUN Competition in 2008. It consists of a three-year "cycle", where each year, or "edition", consists of a different instrument in the rotation: cello, piano, and violin.

== History ==
The competition has been organized by local governments and media companies in South Korea: Gyeongnam Province, the City of Tongyeong and MBC Gyeongnam. To remember Isang Yun, in 2003, the Governor of Gyeongnam Province requested the Tongyeong International Music Festival (통영국제음악제) Foundation to plan and organize an international competition. The foundation, initially chaired by Seong-Yawng Park, created a general prospectus of an annual instrumental competition to nurture international young players between 15 and 29 years old. The event would be held in the city where Yun was born, which was Tongyeong, and the competition dates would be scheduled to include November 3, the date of Yun's death in 1995. However, there were exceptions in the schedule for the years 2003, 2004, and 2009.

The first Gyeongnam International Music Competition was held in 2003. The organizers originally wanted different instrument disciplines. The first discipline selected was cello, since Yun was a famed cellist, and he had composed his first concerto for cello in 1975–76. The organizers then selected violin and piano, because those were the top two disciplines to present the highest quantity of international competitions, and because Yun wrote many works involving those two instruments. They also found that after one cycle of three editions, the winners had an opportunity to collaborate and play in piano trios.

In order to attract an international audience, the organizers wanted the Gyeongnam International Music Competition to be recognized by the World Federation of International Music Competitions (WFIMC). In accordance with WFIMC statutes, the event had to show two editions of success, which it did in 2003 and 2004. The next year, the foundation submitted an application to the WFIMC. In 2006, following a vote held by the federation's general assembly in Geneva, the WFIMC accepted the Gyeongnam International Music Competition as a member competition, which made it the first music competition in South Korea to receive such an honor.

The organizers originally wanted to name the event after Isang Yun, however, the Yun family would not permit it; they were not convinced that the event was sustainable or comparable to other international competitions. The organizers continued to persuade the family, and after demonstrating the event's success, the Yun family eventually consented. The name change was ratified in 2008 by the WFIMC's general assembly in Tbilisi, Georgia. The WFIMC also stipulated that the name "Isang Yun" be titled in all capital letters.

== Editions ==
As of 2011, the competition has completed nine editions and three cycles, rotating among disciplines of cello, violin and piano. The 2012 competition will begin the fourth cycle and tenth edition.

All competitions have been held at the Main Hall of the Tongyeong Arts Center.

Year	Date	Discipline	Notes
2003	November 22–29	Cello	–
2004	November 13–20	Violin	–
2005	October 29 – November 5	Piano	Isang Yun Special Prize was added to list of awards.
2006	October 28 – November 4	Cello	For the first time of Korean competition history, the Competition was approved of full membership by WFIMC.
2007	October 28 – November 4	Violin	Seong-Yawng Park Special Prize was added to list of awards.
2008	November 2–9	Piano	Competition title was officially changed to 'ISANGYUN Competition'.
2009	November 15–22	Cello	–
2010	October 31 – November 7	Piano	Piano now comes after Cello in the rotation.
2011	October 30 – November 6	Violin	It was the last competition to feature 5th Prize Winner.
2012	October 27 – November 4	Cello	The number of finalists were reduced from five to four, while currency of cash prizes was changed from US Dollars to Korean Won.
2013	November 2–10	Piano	For the first time of competition history, the top 2 male prize winners was approved of duty exemption for military services by the Korean Ministry of Culture, Sports and Tourism.
2014	November 1–9	Violin	It was the first edition presented at the 'Tongyeong Concert Hall'; a newly constructed concert hall for classical music in Tongyeong. The number of prize winners were reduced from four to three.
2015		Cello	
2016		Piano	
2017	October 28 – November 5	Violin	

== Schedule ==
=== Preliminary stage ===
As part of the WFIMC statutes, the competition is available to all nationalities.

Months before the event, there is a preliminary stage where the applicants submit a written application, and audio/video material showing his or her performance of a piece from a selected list of artists. A preliminary jury, one of which is a South Korea representative from the regular jury, reviews the applications, and selects "approximately 25 or more" people to participate in the event. The participants then submit their repertoires by mid-September.

=== First stage ===
The first stage lasts two days. The participant plays three pieces with the following constraints:

- One piece is from a selection of works from a list of artists.
- One piece is from a selection of works from Isang Yun.
- One piece is of the performer's choice.
- The total duration of the performances has a time limit.
- The pieces cannot be from the preliminary stage.

A day is placed between the first and second stage. Competitors are notified on whether they advance in the competition.

=== Second stage ===
The second stage lasts two days. The participant plays three pieces with the following constraints:

- One piece is a complete sonata from a selection of works from a list of artists.
- One piece is a complete sonata from a selection of works from Yun, or a contemporary (composed in 1950 or later) artist.
- One piece is of the performer's choice, with restrictions that it cannot be from a composer that has been presented before. A preliminary stage composer may be selected, but a different piece must be chosen. Piano accompaniment is allowed for some pieces.
- The total duration of the performances also has a time limit.
- The best performer of Yun's piece in this stage wins the Isang Yun Special Award.

A day is placed between the second and final stage. Competitors are notified on who is selected as a finalist. In previous competitions there were five finalists, all considered "Prize Winners". Between 2012 and 2013, only four prize winners were awarded. Starting from 2014, there were only three.

=== Final stage ===
The final stage lasts one day. The finalists choose from a list of concertos and play the pieces with a full orchestra. As with the other stages, there is a time limit, and the pieces cannot be from previous stages.

The day after the final stage is the Winners Concert.

The competition originally awarded cash prizes in the currency of US Dollars, but starting with the 2012 Edition, the cash prizes are awarded in Korean Won (KRW).

=== Prizes ===
The following are the prizes from the 2014 competition:

Ranking	Title	Cash Prize	Remarks
1st	1st Prize (Winner)	KRW 30,000,000	granted by Governor of Gyeongnam Province
2nd	2nd Prize (Winner)	KRW 20,000,000	–
3rd	3rd Prize (Winner)	KRW 10,000,000	–
–	Isang Yun Special Prize (Winner)	KRW 2,000,000	awarded to the best performer of Isang Yun's work in the Second Stage
–	Seong-Yawng Park Special Prize (Winner)	KRW 2,000,000	awarded to the most promising Korean competitor of young age in the Second or Final Stage / granted by Kumho Asiana Group

Adjustments

- Income taxes are applied to the cash prize amount acccoing to South Korean tax laws.
- Except for 1st Prize, ties may be awarded, where the prize money for that ranking and the next below ranking are averaged and awarded to the tied Winners.

The winners also have to do concerts and CD recordings, as well as return visits to perform at Tongyeong.

== List of Jury Members ==
The judging for the first, second, and final stage consists of nine "jury" members, two of whom are from South Korea, the host country. Complying with WFIMC statutes, the seven other members must come from other countries. One of the two South Korean jurors participates in the preliminary stage.

Year	Chairman	Preliminary Chairman	Other Members
2003	Siegfried Palm	Myung-Wha Chung (정명화)	Young-Chang Cho (조영창), Lluis Claret, David Geringas, Walter Grimmer, Arto Noras, Leslie Parnas, Tsuyoshi Tsutsumi
2004	Saschko Gawriloff	Min Kim (김민)	Ik-Hwan Bae (배익환), Vera Beths, James Buswell, Yao-Ji Lin, Igor Ozim, Jacqueline Ross, Akiko Tatsumi
2005	Klaus Hellwig	Daejin Kim (김대진)	Tong-Il Han (한동일), Haruko Kasama, Roland Keller, Anna Malikova, Jerome Rose, Erik Tawaststjerna, Françoise Thinat
2006	Wolfgang Boettcher	Minja Hyun (현민자)	Yi-Bing Chu, Jean-Marie Gamard, Toshiaki Hayashi, Paul Katz, Ivan Monighetti, Duk-Sung Na (나덕성), Uzi Wiesel
2007	Gérard Poulet	Nam Yun Kim (김남윤)	Eui Myung Kim (김의명), Harada Koichiro, Sergey Kravchenko, Mihaela Martin, Itzhak Rashkovsky, Krzysztof Wegrzyn, Lina Yu
2008	Robert Levin	Soo-Jung Shin (신수정)	Michel Beroff, Hung-Kuan Chen, Christopher Elton, Kaya Han (한가야), Michael Krist, Hiroko Nakamura, Boris Petrushansky
2009	Myung-Wha Chung (정명화)	Myung-Wha Chung	Richard Aaron, Karine Georgian, Ko Iwasaki, Jong Young Lee (이종영), Jens-Peter Maintz, Philippe Muller, Jian Wang, Hillel Zori
2010	Daiuk Lee (이대욱)	Daiuk Lee	Kyung-Sook Lee (이경숙), Jerome Lowenthal, Siegfried Mauser, Pavel Nersessian, Matti Raekallio, Katsumi Ueda, Xu Zhong, Idith Zvi
2011	Christoph Poppen	Kyung Sun Lee (이경선)	Ariadne Daskalakis, Eszter Haffner, Michael Ma, Jagdish Mistry, Ho Young Pi (피호영), Kyoko Takezawa, Vera Tsu Wei-Ling
2012	Laurence Lesser	Kangho Lee (이강호)	Suren Bagratuni, Andrzej Bauer, Dmitry Feygin, Rocco Filippini, Dong-Oo Lee (이동우), Wen-Sinn Yang, Young Sook Yun (윤영숙)
2013	Tong-Il Han (한동일)	Aviram Reichert	Bao Huiqiao, Akiko Ebi, Young-Lan Han (한영란), Thomas Hecht, Peter Paul Kainrath, Quentin Kim (김정권), Alexander Shtarkman
2014	Young Uck Kim (김영욱)	Young Uck Kim	Shmuel Ashkenasi, Tanja Becker-Bender, Simon Blendis, Boris Garlitsky, Dong-Suk Kang (강동석), Takashi Shimizu, Wei-Dong Tong, Jean-Pierre Wallez
2015	Raimund Trenkler		
2016	Daejin Kim		
2017	Michael Haefliger		

== Results ==
=== Prize Winners ===
The following table is a list of the finalists (aka Prize Winners) for each competition. Starting in 2012, there will only be four finalists.

Year	1st prize	2nd prize	3rd prize	4th prize	5th prize
2003	Julie Albers	Bong-Ihn Koh (고봉인)	Boris Andrianov	Na-Young Baek (백나영)	Silver Ainomae
2004	Bo-Kyoung Lee (이보경)	Erin Keefe	not awarded (ex aequo et bono)	Carla Leurs	Lin Yue
2005	Victoria Kortchinskaia	Da Sol Kim (김다솔)	Norie Takahashi	Alexandre Moutouzkine	Young-Ah Tak (탁영아)
2006	Jung Ran Lee (이정란)	Bartosz Koziak; Narek Hakhnazaryan	not awarded (tie)	Arnold Choi	Massimiliano Martinelli
2007	Haik Kazazyan	Solenne Paidassi	Jae Young Kim (김재영)	Min Jeong Suh (서민정)	Andrey Baranov
2008	Sofya Gulyak	Stanislav Khristenko	Mariangela Vacatello	Hong-Chun Youn (윤홍천)	Christopher Guzman
2009	Christine Rauh	Jee-Hye Bae (배지혜)	Matthew Zalkind	Georgi Anichenko	Sung-Chan Chang (장성찬)
2010	Yunjie Chen	Alessandro Deljavan	Elmar Gasanov	Ju-Eun Lee (이주은); Sungpil Kim (김성필)	not awarded (tie)
2011	Yu-Chien Tseng	Jinjoo Cho (조진주)	Young-Uk Kim (김영욱)	Nigel Armstrong	Ji-Yoon Lee (이지윤)
2012	Uladzimir Sinkevich	Angela Jeanyoung Park (박진영); Alexey Zhilin	not awarded (tie)	Jonathan Dormand	
2013	Hong-gi Kim (김홍기)	Ji Won Han (한지원)	Jeung Beum Sohn (손정범)	So Hyang In (인소향)	
2014	Luke Hsu	Minkyung Sul (설민경)	Wonhee Bae (배원희)		
2015	Ella van Poucke	Mun-Puo Lee	James Jeonghwan Kim (김정환)		
2016	Hans H. Suh (서형민)	Gyu-Tae Ha (하규태)	Minsoo Hong (홍민수); Julia Kociuban		
2017	Ji Won Song	Nancy Zhou	Nigel Armstrong		

=== Isang Yun Special Prize ===
This award is given to the best performer of Isang Yun's piece during the second stage. It was originally named "Special Prize" in 2006, but Yun's name was added in 2007 to distinguish between the two special prizes.

Year	Winner
2005	Sofya Gulyak; Yorck-Hardy Rittner
2006	Jung Ran Lee (이정란)
2007	Haik Kazazyan
2008	Stanislav Khristenko
2009	Christine Rauh
2010	Akihito Okuda
2011	Yu-Chien Tseng
2012	Uladzimir Sinkevich
2013	not awarded
2014	Luke Hsu
2015	Woohyung Suh (서우형)
2016	Hans H. Suh (서형민)
2017	Nigel Armstrong
2025	Andrew Ilhoon Byun

=== Seong-Yawng Park Special Prize ===
Starting in 2007, the Seong-Yawng Park Special Prize is given to the most promising young Korean performer from the second and final stages. It is sponsored by the Kumho Asiana Group.

Year	Winner
2007	Jae Young Kim (김재영)
2008	Hong-Chun Youn (윤홍천)
2009	Yoon-Hye Chung (정윤혜)
2010	Hong-Gi Kim (김홍기)
2011	Eun Ae Koh (고은애)
2012	Angela Jeanyoung Park (박진영)
2013	Hong-gi Kim (김홍기)
2014	Gyehee Kim (김계희)
2015	James Jeonghwan Kim (김정환)
2016	Gyu-Tae Ha (하규태)
2017	Ji Won Song

== See also ==
- List of music festivals in South Korea
- List of classical music festivals
- World Federation of International Music Competitions
- List of classical music competitions
- Tongyeong International Music Festival Foundation
