= Robert Schumann International Competition for Pianists and Singers =

Classical music competition

The Robert Schumann International Competition for Pianists and Singers was constituted in 1956 in East Berlin within the framework of the commemorations on the 100th anniversary of Robert Schumann's death. A second edition was organized on the occasion of the 150th anniversary of the composer's birth, and three years later a third edition was arranged in Zwickau, his birthplace. The competition, a member of the World Federation of International Music Competitions, has taken place in Zwickau every 3 or 4 years since.

== Prize winners ==
=== Piano ===
Piano
Year
1956	1st prize	2nd prize	3rd prize (ex-a.)
	(East Germany) Annerose Schmidt	(Soviet Union) Irina Sijalova	(Poland) Lidia Grychtołówna
			(Soviet Union) Mikhail Voskresensky
1960	No piano category	No piano category	No piano category
1963	1st prize	2nd prize (ex-a.)	3rd prize
	(Soviet Union) Nelly Akopyan	(Bulgaria) Rutka Carakcieva	(Hungary) Aniko Szegedi
		(East Germany) Peter Rösel	
1966	1st prize	2nd prize	3rd prize (ex-a.)
	(Soviet Union) Eliso Virsaladze	(Soviet Union) Svetlana Navasardyan	(Bulgaria) Raina Padareva
			(Bulgaria) Evgenia Sachareva
1969	1st prize	2nd prize	3rd prize
	(Hungary) Dezső Ránki	(Soviet Union) Tatyana Ryumina	(Japan) Okitaka Uehara
1974	1st prize	2nd prize	3rd prize
	(Soviet Union) Pavel Egorov	(Soviet Union) Dina Joffe	(Romania) Petru Grossmann
1977	1st prize	2nd prize	3rd prize
	(Bulgaria) Emma Tahmizian	(Romania) Dana Borşan	(East Germany) Christoph Taubert
1981	1st prize	2nd prize	3rd prize (ex-a.)
	(France) Yves Henry	(East Germany) Susanne Grützmann	(Soviet Union) Kalle Randalu
			(Hungary) Balázs Szokolay
1985	1st prize	2nd prize	3rd prize
	(Soviet Union) Tamriko Siprashvili	(Czechoslovakia) Zuzana Paulechová	(Soviet Union) Mzija Gogashvili
1989	1st prize	2nd prize	3rd prize
	(France) Éric Le Sage	(Japan) Sachiko Yonekawa	(Soviet Union) Alexander Melnikov
1993	1st prize	2nd prize	3rd prize
	(Kazakhstan) Temirzhan Yerzhanov	(Japan) Eiji Shigaki	(Italy) Corrado Rollero
1996	1st prize	2nd prize	3rd prize (ex-a.)
	(Russia) Mikhail Mordvinov	(Romania) (France) Dana Ciocarlie	(Russia) Lyubov Gegechkori
			(Germany) Christian Seibert
2000	1st prize	2nd prize	3rd prize
	(Japan) Kiai Nara	(Uzbekistan) Ulugbek Palvanov	(Italy) Andrea Rebaudengo
2004	1st prize	2nd prize	3rd prize
	(Japan) Akiko Yamamoto	(France) Nicolas Bringuier	(South Korea) (United States) Soojin Ahn
2008	1st prize	2nd prize	3rd prize
	(Japan) Mizuka Kano	(Japan) Akiko Nikami	(South Korea) Da Sol Kim
2012	1st prize	2nd prize	3rd prize
	(Croatia) Aljoša Jurinić	(Belgium) Florian Noack	(Italy) Luca Buratto
2016	1st prize	2nd prize	3rd prize
	not awarded	(Japan) Tomoyo Umemura	(Hong Kong) Tiffany Poon
		(China) Cheng Zhang	(Japan) Maiko Ami

=== Voice ===
Voice
Year
1956	1st prize (ex-a.)	2nd prize (ex-a.)	3rd prize
	(Soviet Union) Kira Isotova	(East Germany) Sigrid Kehl	(Romania) Dan Iordăchescu
	(Soviet Union) Aleksander Vedernikov	(Czechoslovakia) Jiří Bar	
1960	1st prize	2nd prize (ex-a.)	3rd prize (ex-a.)
	(Soviet Union) Vitali Gromadski	(East Germany) Wolfgang Hellmich	(Hungary) Sylvia Geszty
		(Czechoslovakia) Roman Horák	(Soviet Union) Violanta Sirotinina
1963	1st prize	2nd prize	3rd prize
	(East Germany) Karl Heinz Stryczek	(Soviet Union) Evgeni Isakov	(East Germany) Friederike Apelt
1966	1st prize	2nd prize	3rd prize
	(Romania) Ionel Pantea	(Uruguay) Julia Albonico	(East Germany) Jürgen Hartfiel
1969	1st prize	2nd prize	3rd prize
Ladies	(East Germany) Heidi Berthold-Riess	(East Germany) Rosemarie Lang	(Romania) Georgina Orlovschi
Gentlemen	(Soviet Union) Ruben Lisician	(East Germany) Peter Tschaplik	(East Germany) Siegfried Lorenz
1974	1st prize	2nd prize	3rd prize
Ladies	(Japan) Mitsuko Shirai	(East Germany) Andrea Ihle	(Bulgaria) Violetta Madjarova
Gentlemen	(Hungary) Lászlo Polgár	(Soviet Union) Sergej Lejferkus	(Romania) Mihai Zamfir
1977	1st prize	2nd prize	3rd prize
Ladies	(Canada) Edith Wiens	(United States) Mary Ann Hart	(Czechoslovakia) Jana Mrázová
Gentlemen	(Soviet Union) Boris Mareskin	(Soviet Union) Alibek Dnisev	(East Germany) Christoph Rösel
1981	1st prize	2nd prize	3rd prize
Ladies	not awarded	(Romania) Constanza Mestes	(Hungary) Györgyi Benza (Ex aequo)
			(Bulgaria) Nadja Cvetkova (Ex aequo)
Gentlemen	(East Germany) Jürgen Kurth	(East Germany) Andreas Scheibner	(East Germany) Matthias Weichert
1985	1st prize	2nd prize	3rd prize
Ladies	not awarded	(East Germany) Cornelia Wosnitza	(East Germany) Kirsten Bertkau
Gentlemen	(East Germany) Karsten Mewes	(East Germany) Egbert Junghanns	(East Germany) Thomas Mäthger
1989	1st prize	2nd prize	3rd prize
Ladies	not awarded	(East Germany) Angela Liebold (Ex aequo)	(East Germany) Britta Schwarz
		(Soviet Union) Svetlana Sumaceva (Ex aequo)	
Gentlemen	(East Germany) Frank Schiller	(East Germany) Matthias Goerne	(East Germany) Torsten Frisch
1993	1st prize	2nd prize	3rd prize
Ladies	not awarded	(Japan) Asako Motojima	(Germany) Barbara Hölzl (Ex aequo)
			(Japan) Fumiko Hatayama (Ex aequo)
Gentlemen	(South Korea) Locky Chung	(Germany) Stefan Geyer	(Germany) Raimond Spogis
1996	1st prize	2nd prize	3rd prize
Ladies	(Japan) Risako Kurosawa	(Switzerland) Maria-Riccarda Schmid	(Norway) Bodil Arnesen
Gentlemen	(Germany) Henryk Böhm	(Japan) Hideki Kadoya	(Romania) Marius Budoin
2000	1st prize	2nd prize	3rd prize
Ladies	(Germany) Annette Dasch	(Germany) Christa Mayer	(Canada) Measha Brueggergosman
Gentlemen	not awarded	(Austria) Klemens Geyrhofer	(South Korea) Kyu-Hee Cho
2004	1st prize	2nd prize	3rd prize
Ladies	not awarded	(Germany) Stefanie Irányi (Ex aequo)	(Germany) Julia Amos
		(Germany) Lydia Teuscher (Ex aequo)	
Gentlemen	(Canada) Colin Balzer	(Austria) Daniel Wolfgang Johannsen	(Canada) Peter McGillivray
2008	1st prize	2nd prize	3rd prize
Ladies	(Germany) Anne-Theresa Albrecht	(Germany) (Chile) Carolina Ullrich	(Hungary) Julia Hajnóczy (Ex aequo)
			(Germany) Sophie Harmsen (Ex aequo)
Gentlemen		(Germany) Christoph Pohl (Ex aequo)	(United States) Jesse Blumberg
		(Poland) Tomasz Wija (Ex aequo)	
2012	1st prize	2nd prize	3rd prize
Ladies	(Germany) Anna Lucia Richter	(Egypt) Fatma Said	(Australia) Simone Easthope (Ex aequo)
			(Germany) Annika Boos (Ex aequo)
Gentlemen	(Switzerland) Mauro Peter	(Germany) Georg Gädker (Ex aequo)	not awarded
		(Germany) Sebastian Wartig (Ex aequo)	
2016	1st prize	2nd prize	3rd prize
Ladies	(Germany) Henriette Gödde	(Germany) Hiltrud Kuhlmann	(Israel) (Germany) Hagar Sharvit
Gentlemen	(Portugal) André Baleiro	(France) Jean-Christophe Fillol	(United States) Jonathan Michie

=== String quartet ===
String Quartet
Year
1960	1st prize	2nd prize	3rd prize
	(Sweden) Jan-Evert-Andersson-Quartett	(Hungary) Peter-Komlós-Quartett	(East Germany) Christian-Lucaß-Quartett
