= Edith Lyman Kuether =

American violinist and writer

- Born: May 17, 1915
- Died: January 19, 2013 (aged 97)
- Occupation: novelist
- Writing career
- Pen name: Margaret Malcolm
- Language: English
- Period: 1973
- Genre: Mystery novel

Edith Lyman Kuether (May 17, 1915 – January 19, 2013), was an American violinist and writer of a novel under the pseudonym of Margaret Malcolm.

== Biography ==
Edith Lyman Kuether was born May 17, 1915. She was a native of Columbus, Ohio, and a 1937 graduate of the Oberlin College Conservatory of Music in Ohio. Mrs. Kuether played in the violin section of the National Symphony Orchestra when it went on a national tour in 1969, under the baton of Boston Pops Orchestra director Arthur Fiedler. From 1962 to 1975, she played violin in the orchestra for the annual Christmas performances of the Nutcracker ballet at Lisner Auditorium in Washington, D.C. She was a past president of the Friday Morning Music Club in Washington. Under the pseudonym Margaret Malcolm, she wrote a novel, “Headless Beings” (1973), a mystery set in Scotland, where she and her husband had traveled often. She used the pseudonym of Margaret Malcolm in honour of Saint Margaret Atheling and her husband, the Scottish king Malcolm Canmore.

== Bibliography ==
=== As Margaret Malcolm ===
- Headless Beings (1973/01)
