= Paul Lewis (pianist) =

British pianist (born 1972)

Paul Lewis CBE
- Born: Paul Lewis; 20 May 1972 (age 54); Liverpool, England
- Genre: Classical
- Occupation: Classical pianist
- Instrument: Piano
- Website: paullewispiano.co.uk

Paul Lewis CBE (born 20 May 1972) is an English classical pianist.

== Early life ==
Lewis's father worked at the Liverpool Docks and his mother was a local council worker; there were no musicians in his family background. Lewis began by playing the cello, the only instrument for which his school could offer him tuition. At the age of 14 he was accepted by Chetham's School of Music in Manchester, where his piano studies blossomed. His teachers included Ryszard Bakst (at Chetham's), Joan Havill (at the Guildhall School of Music and Drama) and Alfred Brendel, whom Lewis acknowledges as a mentor. His first international achievement was the second prize at the 1994 World Piano Competition in London. He also won the Dudley Piano Competition and the Royal Overseas League Piano Competition.

== Career ==
Lewis is strongly affiliated with the Wigmore Hall, London.

Lewis performed all 32 of the Beethoven piano sonatas, on tour in the United States and Europe, between the 2005 and 2007 seasons, in parallel with his complete recording of the cycle for Harmonia Mundi. Each of these CD releases has been included in Gramophone magazine's "Editor's Choice", and in August 2008, volume 4 of the series was awarded Gramophone's "Best Instrumental" recording and "Best Recording of the Year". In July and August 2010 Lewis became the first pianist to perform all five Beethoven Concertos in a single season of The BBC Proms.

In 2015, he succeeded Fanny Waterman as artistic director of the Leeds International Piano Competition, jointly with conductor Adam Gatehouse. He also chaired the competition's jury.

Lewis was appointed Commander of the Order of the British Empire (CBE), in the 2016 Birthday Honours, for services to music.

In 2021, Paul Lewis became an Irish citizen.

== Reviews ==
Writing in The Daily Telegraph, Geoffrey Norris said, "There is in Lewis's playing a strong physicality, a firm connection between his deep thinking about the music and his articulation of it. He knows and can define its character, and can show how its rhythmic, harmonic and melodic components coalesce. This was playing of intellectual rigour and imaginative vigour."

In a 2016 interview with The Guardian, Lewis revealed that his musical guilty pleasure was the 1968 single "Paralyzed" by the Legendary Stardust Cowboy.

== Discography ==
- Harmonia Mundi:
  - Schubert: Piano Sonata No. 19 in C minor, D. 958, Piano Sonata No. 14 in A minor ("Grande Sonate"), D. 784 (Op. posth. 143) (2002) CD ASIN B00005QG1F
  - Schubert. Last Sonatas D.959 & D.960, (2003) CD (HMC901800) ASIN B00008O6EO
  - Liszt: Sonata in B minor (2004) CD (HMC901845) ASIN B0002I746S
  - Beethoven: Complete Piano Sonatas, Vol.1 (2005) CD (HMC901902) ASIN B000A5B25W
  - Beethoven: Complete Piano Sonatas, Vol.2 (2007) CD (HMC901903.05, 3 CDs) ASIN B000HXDS04
  - Beethoven: Complete Piano Sonatas, Vol.3 (2007) CD (HMC901906.08, 3 CDs)
  - Beethoven: Complete Piano Sonatas, Vol.4 (2008) CD (HMC901909.11, 3 CDs)
  - Beethoven: Complete Piano Concertos, BBC Symphony Orchestra/Jiri Belohlavek (2010) (3 CDs)
  - Beethoven: Diabelli Variations, Op. 120 (2011) CD (HMC902071)
  - Schubert: Die Schöne Müllerin D.795, Mark Padmore – Tenor
  - Schubert: Winterreise D.911, Mark Padmore – Tenor
- Hyperion Records:
  - Mozart: Piano Quartet in G minor; Piano Quartet in E flat (with Leopold String Trio) (2003) ASIN B00008ZZ3E
  - Schubert: Trout Quintet (with Leopold String Trio and Graham Mitchell)
  - Schubert: Piano Duets (with Steven Osborne)
  - Schubert: French Duets (with Steven Osborne) (2021) CD (CDA68329)
