= Aljoša Jurinić =

Croatian pianist

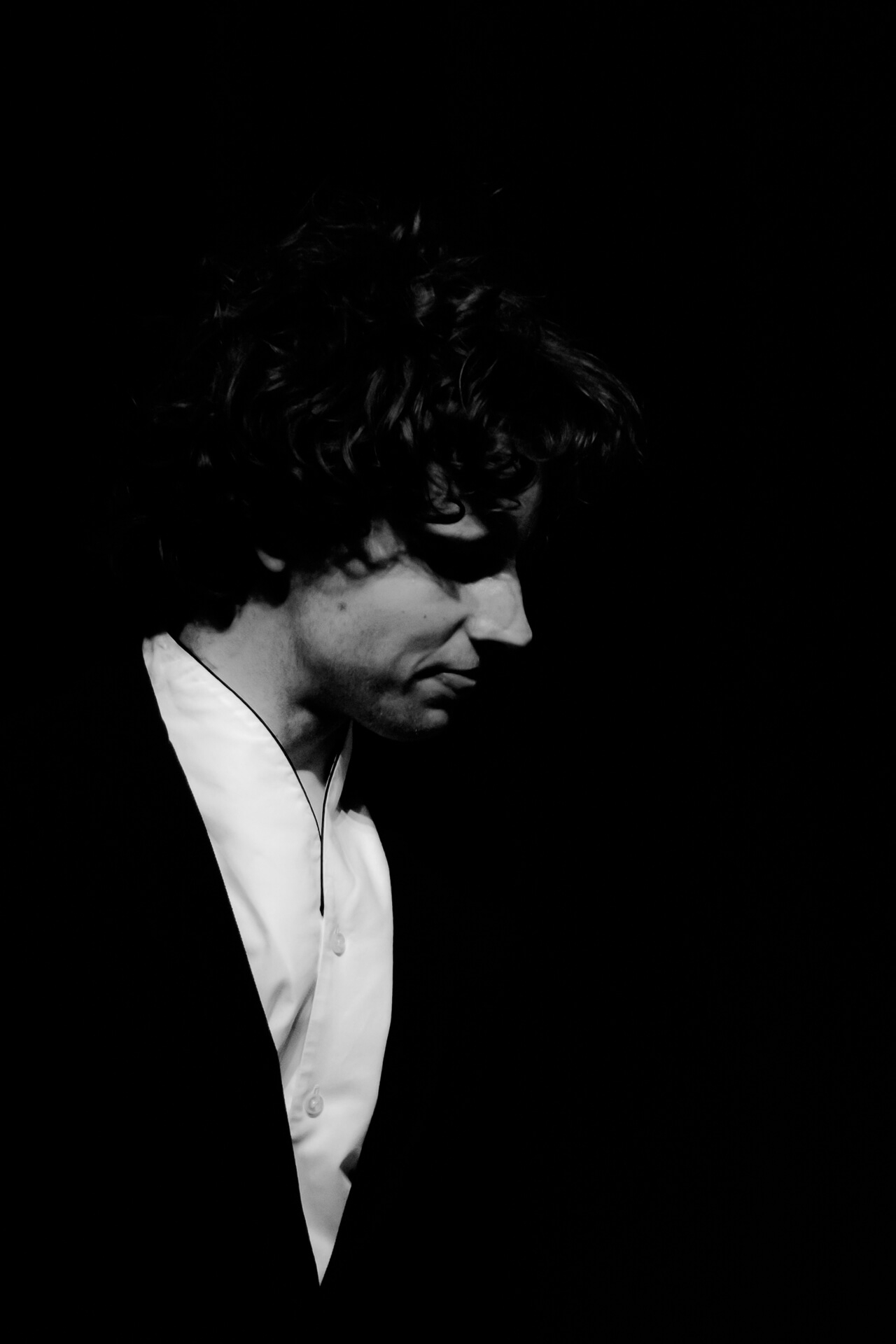
- Jurinić in 2020

Background information
- Born: June 2, 1989 (age 37); Zagreb, Croatia
- Genres: Classical
- Instrument: Piano

Aljoša Jurinić (born June 2, 1989) is a Croatian pianist who has established himself at the world's most prestigious piano competitions. He is best known for winning the 2012 Robert Schumann International Competition in the composer’s hometown of Zwickau. He was also a laureate at the 2016 Queen Elisabeth International Competition and the 2018 Leeds International Piano Competition, as well as a finalist at the 2015 International Chopin Piano Competition. In 2019, the president of Croatia awarded him the Order of Danica Hrvatska for outstanding achievements in culture and the international promotion of his country.

== Career ==
Jurinić has appeared as a soloist and with orchestras at prominent venues in over 35 countries across five continents, including New York City's Carnegie Hall, Vienna's Musikverein, Salle Cortot in Paris, Gasteig in Munich, Tokyo Opera City Tower Concert Hall, Osaka Festival Hall, La Sala Verdi in Milan, Bozar in Brussels, Lisinski Concert Hall in Zagreb, Kolarac in Belgrade, and many others. In addition, he held several recital and orchestra tours in China and Japan.

His discography includes five albums featuring works by Chopin, Schumann, and Debussy. A sought-after chamber musician, Jurinić has collaborated with world-renowned instrumentalists such as Kian Soltani (cello), Luka Šulić (cello) and Petrit Çeku (guitar), to name a few.

== Education ==
Jurinić began playing piano at the age of 8 at Pavao Markovac Music School in his hometown of Zagreb, studying under Jasna Reba. He later enrolled at the Academy of Music, University of Zagreb, where he earned his Bachelor of Music degree in 2011 and Master of Music degree in 2012, studying with Ruben Dalibaltayan. During this time, he also spent two years as an exchange student through the Erasmus Programme at the University of Music and Performing Arts Vienna, studying under Noel Flores. His postgraduate education included attending the Fiesole School of Music with Eliso Virsaladze from 2011 to 2014. He subsequently obtained a Konzertexamen degree from the University of Music Franz Liszt Weimar (2014-2019) under Grigory Gruzman. Jurinić pursued a Doctor of Musical Arts degree at the University of Toronto. Based in Boston, he is also a Visiting Artist at the Massachusetts Institute of Technology (MIT), where he is exploring the biomechanics of piano playing.

== Discography ==
- Highlights of the Robert Schumann International Competition (2012)
- Chopin Alive — solo album (2016)
- Highlights of the Queen Elisabeth International Competition (2016)
- Highlights of the Sydney International Piano Competition (2016)
- Correspondances — solo album featuring Frédéric Chopin and Robert Schumann (2020)
- Chopin: Piano Sonatas No. 2 and No. 3 — solo album (2025)
