= Wolfgang Manz =

German pianist

Wolfgang Manz (born 1960 in Düsseldorf) is a German pianist.

He won Berlin's 1980 Mendelssohn competition and was awarded 2nd prizes at Leeds' (1981) and Brussels' (1983) competitions. An international concert career ensued. A professor at Nürnberg's Musikhochschule, he remains active in his homeland.
