= Yu-Chien Tseng =

Taiwanese violinist

- 曾宇謙
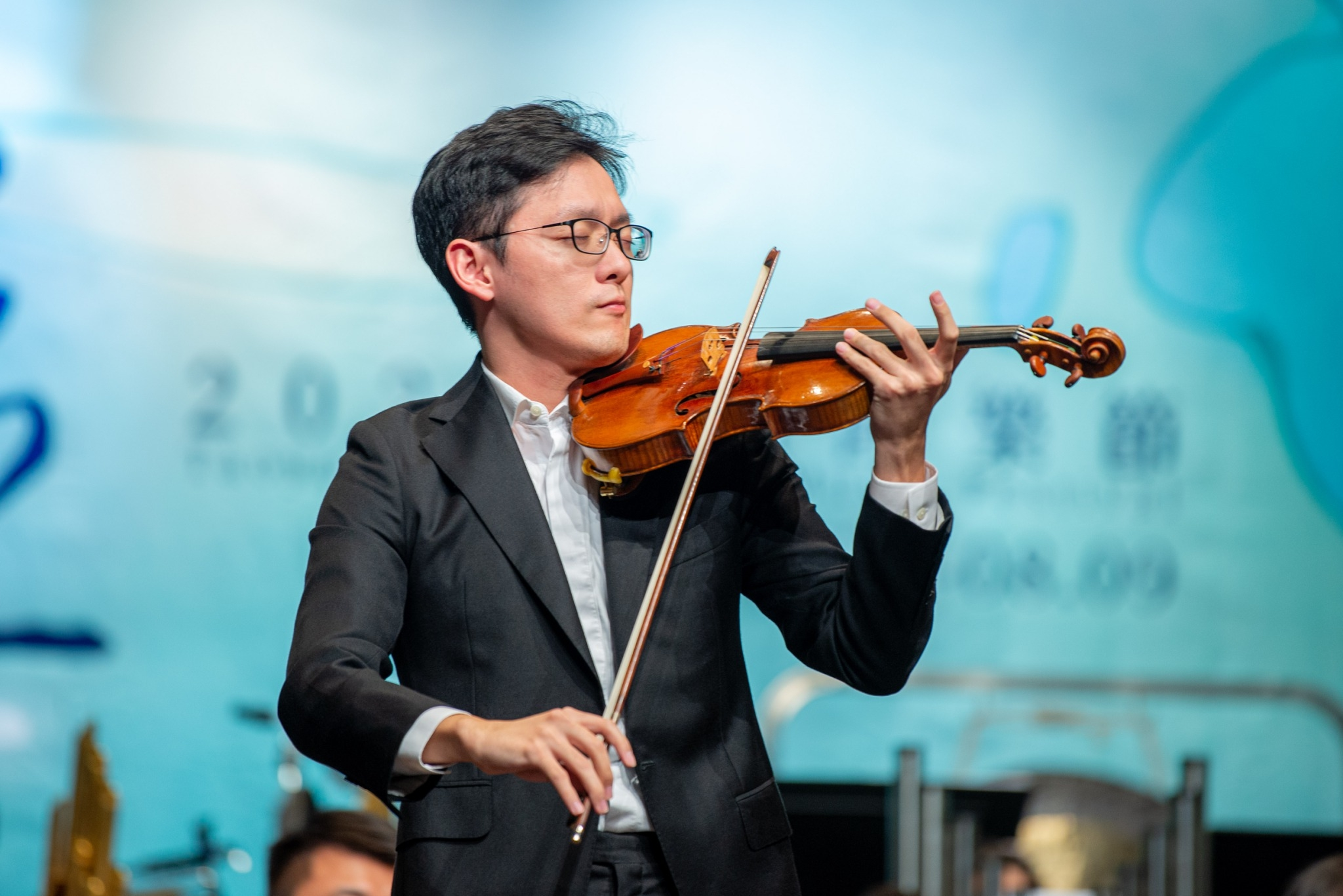
- Yu-Chien Tseng photographed in 2020.
- Born: August 24, 1994 (age 31); Taipei County, Taiwan
- Other name: Benny
- Education: Curtis Institute of Music
- Occupation: Classical violinist
- Years active: 2005 - present
- Website: yuchientseng.com

Yu-Chien (Benny) Tseng (Chinese: 曾宇謙; pinyin: Zēng Yǔqiān; Wade–Giles: Tsêng Yü-ch'ien; born August 24, 1994) is a Taiwanese violinist. In 2012 he was fifth laureate in the Queen Elisabeth Music Competition, where he also won both the Musiq'3 and the Klara-Canvas prizes awarded by the public. In the 15th International Tchaikovsky Competition held in 2015, Tseng won the 2nd prize in the violin contest, in which no first prize was awarded. Tseng has recorded for Fuga Libera and the Chimei Museum.

== Life and career ==
Yu-Chien Tseng was born in Taipei County (now New Taipei City). In pre-school, Tseng's parents worried that he was tone deaf. His father enrolled him in percussion classes after hearing tests showed Tseng's hearing to be normal. He started to study the violin at the age of 5. By the age of 6, he had already performed with the Taipei Symphony Orchestra. In his native Taiwan, he studied with Po-Shan Lin, Ying-Liang Shen, I-Ching Li and C. Nanette Chen. Since 2008 he has studied at the Curtis Institute of Music, under professors Ida Kavafian and Aaron Rosand. In 2009 he won the 10th Pablo Sarasate International Competition in Pamplona (Spain). In 2011 he won the Isang Yun Competition in Tongyeong (South Korea) and also was awarded a special prize at the XIV International Tchaikovsky Competition (as best of those in Round II who did not make the finals). In 2012 he took fifth place in the Queen Elisabeth Competition in Brussels. He has performed with the Philadelphia Orchestra, the National Orchestra of Belgium, and the symphony orchestras of Singapore, Taipei, and Navarra among others. He has given solo concerts in cities in the US, Europe and Asia.

In 2017, Tseng was featured in the opening ceremony of the 2017 Summer Universiade in Taipei, Taiwan with a solo violin performance.

== Awards ==
- 2006: Third Prize in Yehudi Menuhin International Competition for Young Violinists Junior division
- 2009: First Prize and Prize to Best Interpreter of Works by Sarasate in 10th Pablo Sarasate International Competition in Pamplona (Spain)
- 2010: Associazione Amici di Paganini Prize and Prize in memory of Dr. Enrico Costa in the 53rd Paganini Competition
- 2011: Jury Discretionary Award in The XIV International Tchaikovsky Competition
- 2011: First Prize and Isang Yun Special Prize in Isang Yun Competition in Tongyeong (South Korea)
- 2012: Fifth Prize in Queen Elisabeth Competition
- 2015: First Prize in Singapore International Violin Competition
- 2015: Second Prize in the XV International Tchaikovsky Competition (no first prize awarded)

== Recordings ==
His debut disc featuring music by French composers was released by Fuga Libera.

- Franck, Ravel, Debussy - French Violin Sonatas with Inga Dzektser, piano (Fuga Libera: FUG597)
- Sarasate Violin Pieces (Chimei Museum: S000887011011088)
- Reverie: Chopin, Ernst, Mozart, Tartini, Tchaikovsky, Wieniawski with Rohan De Silva, piano (Universal Music Taiwan / Deutsche Grammophon: UCCG-1774)
