= Mauro Peter =

Swiss singer and opera singer

Mauro Peter (born in 1987) is a Swiss operatic lyric tenor.

== Life ==
Born in Lucerne, Peter gained his first experience as a child with the Lucerne Boys Choir. From 2008 he was trained by Fenna Kügel-Seifried at the Hochschule für Musik und Theater München and since 2010 by the Bayerische Theaterakademie August Everding in Munich. At the same time he attended the oratorio class of Christoph Adt and the lied class of Helmut Deutsch. In 2009 Peter made his debut with the Bad Reichenhaller Philharmoniker as Ferrando in Così fan tutte, in 2010 he also gave Don Ottavio and in 2011 Tamino. In 2011 he had engagements at other Munich institutions, the Staatstheater am Gärtnerplatz, the Bayerische Theaterakademie and in 2012 at the Prinzregententheater.

Peter joined several times with the Münchner Rundfunkorchester (conductor Ulf Schirmer) in oratorios by J. S. Bach, G. F. Händel, Joseph Haydn, Giacomo Puccini and Gioacchino Rossini as well as in Mozart's Requiem.

Peter's song repertoire includes songs by Samuel Barber, Franz Liszt, Franz Schubert (Die schöne Müllerin also in an adapted version for orchestra at the Theater Rudolstadt), Peter Warlock and Hugo Wolf. He made his debut at the Schubertiade Vorarlberg and the Salzburg Festival in 2012 and since then has been a regular guest at both these venues.

Since the 2013/14 season he has been a member of the ensemble at the Zürich Opera House. At the beginning of 2014, Peter made his debut, again with Schubert's Müllerin, at the Wigmore Hall. In 2014 he made his debut in the Mozart Da Ponte cycle at the Theater an der Wien under the musical direction of Nikolaus Harnoncourt.

In 2015 he made his debut, again with Tamino, at the Paris Opera, at the Bayerische Staatsoper Munich and in 2017 at the Royal Opera House Covent Garden. At La Scala in Milan he made his debut as Belmonte in Mozart's Die Entführung aus dem Serail. He sang the same role at the Toronto Opera House Canadian Opera Company.

In 2015 his debut CD with Goethe songs by Franz Schubert was released, and in 2016 a Schumann album on Sony Classical.

== Awards ==
- Prize winner of the Kammeroper Schloss Rheinsberg and scholarship holder of the Deutscher Bühnenverein (Bavarian regional association). In 2010 he received a sponsorship award from the Vera und Volker Doppelfeld Foundation.
- Winner of the Robert Schumann International Competition for Pianists and Singers in 2012.
- Participant at the International Classical Music Awards in 2017.
