= Andrea Ihle =

German opera singer (born 1953)

- Andrea Ihle, c. 1990
- Born: 17 April 1953; Dresden, German Democratic Republic
- Died: 18 June 2023 (aged 70); Dresden, Germany
- Education: Musikhochschule Dresden
- Occupation: Operatic soprano
- Organizations: Staatsoper Dresden
- Title: Kammersängerin
- Awards: Robert Schumann Competition

Andrea Ihle (17 April 1953 – 18 Juni 2023) was a German operatic soprano. A long-term member of the Staatsoper Dresden, she performed a wide range of roles from coloratura soprano to character roles. She appeared as Ännchen in Weber's Der Freischütz in the opening performance of the rebuilt Semperoper, in world premieres and in contemporary opera such as Udo Zimmermann's Der Schuhu und die fliegende Prinzessin

== Career ==
Born in Dresden, Ihle completed her vocal studies at the Musikhochschule Dresden, where she was a pupil of Klara Elfriede Intrau. In 1974 she won the 2nd prize at the Robert Schumann International Competition for Pianists and Singers in Zwickau.

In 1976 she made her debut at the Staatsoper Dresden in the role of Giannetta in Donizetti's L'elisir d'amore. Since then she has been an ensemble member of the Dresden State Opera, where she became known first as a coloratura soprano. She performed roles such as Despina in Mozart's Così fan tutte, Papagena in Die Zauberflöte, Ännchen in Weber's Der Freischütz, Gretel in Humperdinck's Hänsel und Gretel, Marie in Lortzing's Der Waffenschmied, Carolina in Cimarosa's Il matrimonio segreto and Sophie in Der Rosenkavalier by Richard Strauss. Ihle also appeared in lyric soprano roles, such as Eurydice in Gluck's Orfeo ed Euridice, Donna Elvira in Mozart's Don Giovanni and Alice Ford in Verdi's Falstaff.

On 13 February 1985, Ihle sang the role of Ännchen in Weber's Der Freischütz in the opening performance of the rebuilt Semperoper. She appeared as Axinja in Shostakovich's Lady Macbeth of the Mtsensk District in 1999, and in the female title role in Udo Zimmermann's Der Schuhu und die fliegende Prinzessin. Character roles included the fortune teller in Arabella by Richard Strauss in 2005. In May 2006, she took part in the European premiere of Jake Heggie's Dead Man Walking, as Mrs. Charlton. In 2007, she appeared as Leitmetzerin during the Dresden Festtage in honour of Richard Strauss. In May 2008, she sang Matilde Di Spelta in the world premiere of Manfred Trojahn's La grande magia. In the 2010/11 she appeared as Marzellina in Rossini's Il barbiere di Siviglia and as Virtù in Monteverdi's L'incoronazione di Poppea.

Ihle made international guest appearances mainly with the ensemble of the Dresden State Opera, such as in 1982 as the milliner in Der Rosenkavalier in Venice. In April 2010, she gave a guest performance at the Deutsche Oper Berlin as Ortlinde in Wagner's Die Walküre. In addition to her operatic activities, Ihle is also known as a concert singer in oratorios, masses, and sacred vocal works. She was honoured with the title Kammersängerin.

Ihle died on 18 June 2023, at the age of 70.
