= Elmar Gasanov =

Elmar Vagifovich Gasanov Эльмар Вагифович Гасанов
- Born: 1983 (age 42–43); Sevastopol, Ukrainian SSR, Soviet Union
- Genres: Classical
- Occupation: Pianist
- Instrument: Piano

Elmar Vagifovich Gasanov (Note: Russian: Эльмар Вагифович Гасанов, romanized: Elmar Vagifovich Gasanov) (Russian: Эльмар Вагифович Гасанов; born 1983) is a pianist. Born in Sevastopol, Gasanov trained at the Moscow Conservatory who represents Russia at international competitions. He later undertook postgraduate studies at London's Royal College of Music, as a student of Vanessa Latarche. Gasanov graduated with the Master of Music degree with Distinction.

Gasanov has given solo and concerto performances outside his native Russia, including appearances in Hungary (Budapest Spring Festival), Germany (Baden-Baden Summer Festival), France (Colmar Festival), Holland, Austria, the UK (Campden Music Festival), in Turkey, Brazil, USA, Slovakia, Sloveniya, Ukraine, as well as Switzerland (Zurich Tonhalle, Paul Klee Centre Berne, Crans-Montana.)

Gasanov regularly works with renowned orchestras and conductors, including the Musikkollegium Winterthur under Theodor Guschlbauer, Tonhalle Orchester Zurich under David Zinman, Concerto Budapest under Andras Keller, the INSO Orchestra Lviv under Georg Kugi and others, the Hong Kong Philharmonic Orchestra under Vladimir Ashkenazy.

In 2012, EMI Records released his recording of Liszt's Sonata B minor within project Digital Debut.

== Competition record ==
- 2000 - Vladimir Krainev IPC, Kharkiv: 1st prize
- 2006 - Franz Liszt-Béla Bartók IPC, Budapest: 1st prize
- 2010 - ISANGYUN Competition, Tongyeong: 3rd prize
- 2011 - Hong Kong Piano Competition: 5th prize
- 2011 - Geza Anda Piano Competition, Zurich: 3rd prize and the Schumann prize
