= Adam Gatehouse =

English conductor, radio producer and editor

Adam Gatehouse (born c. 1950) is an English conductor, radio producer and editor, and classical music administrator. He was the main conductor of the Ballet Rambert and the Dutch National Ballet before working for BBC Radio 3 (1991–2013), where he became editor of live music, and founded the New Generation Artists scheme and the Wigmore Hall lunchtime concert series. He was artistic director of the Leeds International Piano Competition from 2015 until 2025.

== Early life and education ==
Gatehouse was born in London, and attended the Lycée Francais de Londres and the Royal College of Music, where he studied piano and clarinet. His first degree is in music and English which he studied at Dartington Hall and Exeter University. He then went to the Guildhall School of Music, where he studied conducting under Vilem Tausky, Sir Adrian Boult and André Previn.

== Career ==
=== Conducting ===
Gatehouse started his professional conducting career as the musical director of the Ballet Rambert (1974–78). He was also the founding conductor of the Wolsey Orchestra (1972–76), then an amateur chamber orchestra. He then became the principal conductor and musical director of the Dutch National Ballet (1978–89) and of the Dutch National Youth Orchestra (1980–90). He was also the artistic advisor to the Royal Concertgebouw in Amsterdam (1988–91).

He has been the conductor of the Ipswich Symphony Orchestra since 2000. Other orchestras that he has conducted as a guest include the Barcelona Symphony Orchestra, Brooklyn Philharmonic Orchestra, La Fenice, Lamoureux Orchestra, Orchestre de Bordeaux Aquitaine, Royal Ballet and the Tenerife Symphony Orchestra. In 2013, he conducted the world première of and the Crowd (wept), an opera by composer Erick Flores and librettist Afsaneh Gray about Jade Goody, the late reality television star.

=== Radio 3 ===
In 1991, Gatehouse gave up full-time conducting to join Radio 3, the BBC's classical music radio station, at first as a producer and subsequently as the editor for live music. He made radio programmes, including documentaries on the Russian ballet dancer Rudolf Nureyev and the Russian composer Sergei Prokofiev, which received Sony Radio Awards. He founded the BBC Wigmore Hall lunchtime concert series in 1998, which was broadcast on Radio 3, and continued to run it until 2013. He also founded the London Symphony Orchestra's lunchtime concert series at St Luke's. He was also responsible for special Radio 3 programming on several composers, including composer weeks for Schubert and Tchaikovsky.

In 1999, he founded the BBC Radio 3 New Generation Artists scheme (NGA), which aims to boost the careers of six or seven selected young classical performers or groups each year with concerts, recordings and Radio 3 broadcasts. He continued to direct the scheme until 2013, when he left Radio 3. Prominent musicians who participated in the scheme include the pianists Benjamin Grosvenor, Igor Levit, Paul Lewis and Steven Osborne, violinist Alina Ibragimova, trumpeter Alison Balsom, percussionist Colin Currie, mezzo-soprano Alice Coote and the Belcea Quartet. Jonathan Lennie, writing in Time Out in 2009, called it "a tribute to his intuition ... that practically all of the 60 NGAs have lived up to their potential." Meurig Bowen, director of the Cheltenham Music Festival, commented that his "gift for detecting signs of greatness early on in musicians' careers has proved to be second-to-none."

=== Other roles ===
Gatehouse served on the jury of the Leeds International Piano Competition in 2012 and 2015, and in 2015, he took over from Fanny Waterman as the artistic director of the competition, initially jointly with Paul Lewis, and from 2019, as the sole director. Martin Cullingford, writing in Gramophone magazine, commented that "Gatehouse's role in launching the BBC New Generation Artists scheme ... well places him to help discover the next generation of keyboard greats."

He was also a jury member for the BBC Cardiff Singer of the World competition in 2009 and 2013.

In 2006, he founded the Festival de Valloires, a week-long chamber music festival held at Argoules, France, which he also directed. He serves on the Artistic Committee of the Borletti-Buitoni Trust, a charitable trust that gives grants to young musicians.
