= Sofya Gulyak =

Russian pianist (born 1979)

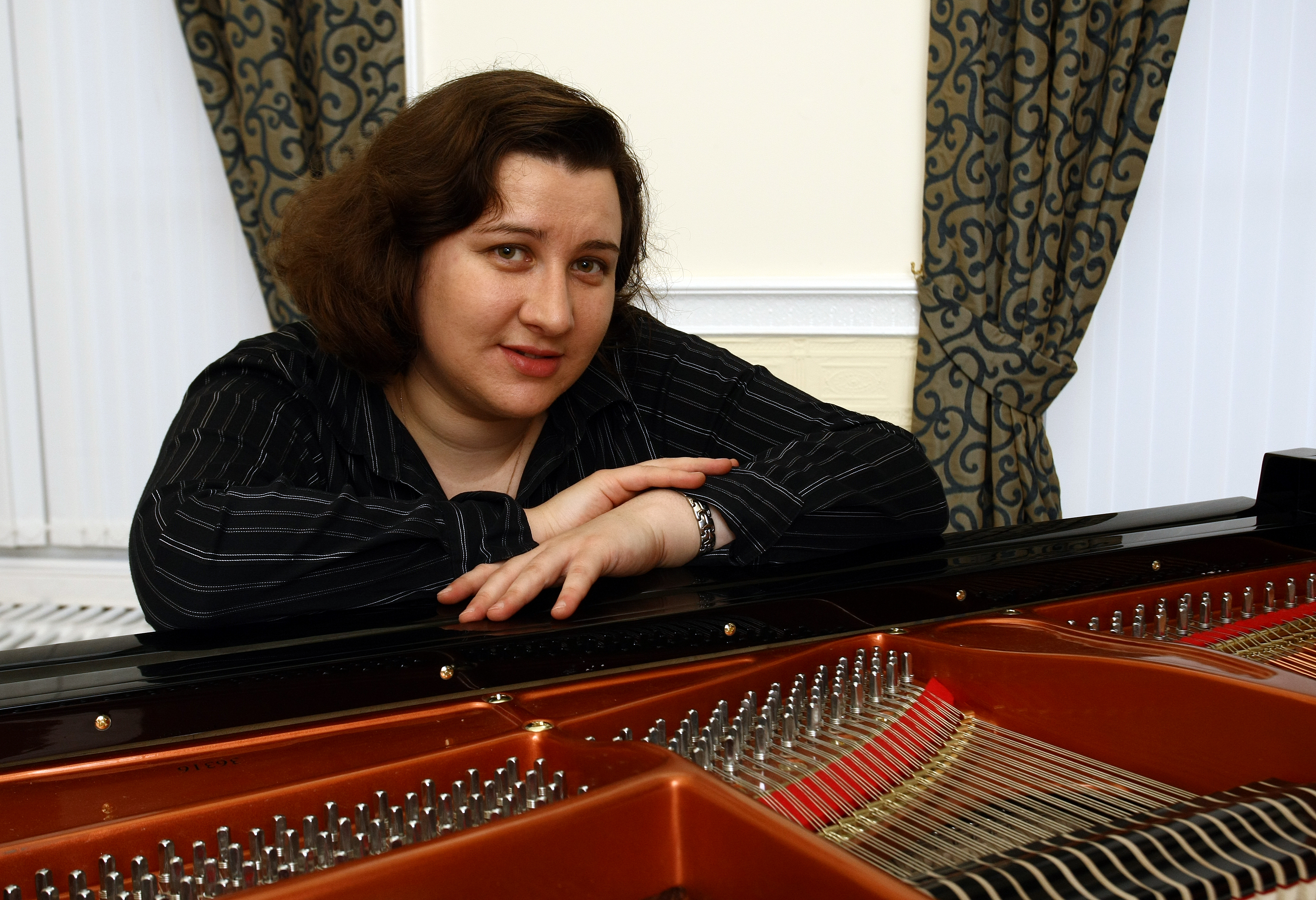

Background information
- Born: 1979 (age 46–47); Kazan, Russian SFSR, Soviet Union
- Genres: Classical
- Occupation: Pianist
- Instruments: Piano
- Awards: (gold) 1st Prize, Leeds International Pianoforte Competition

Sofya Gulyak (born 29 December 1979) is a Russian classical pianist. She was the first woman to win the Leeds Piano Competition.

Gulyak was born in Kazan. She studied at the Kazan State Conservatoire, Piano Academy Incontri col Maestro, and the Royal College of Music. In 2006, she won first prize in the Sigismund Thalberg International Piano Competition. In 2007, she won the William Kapell Competition and shared the Concorso F. Busoni second prize with Dinara Nadzhafova. Gulyak was the winner of the 2008 Washington International Competition of the Friday Morning Music Club, and also won ISANGYUN Competition 2008. In 2009, she won the 1st prize in the Leeds International Pianoforte Competition. She is the first female winner of the competition.
