= Gwendolyn Bradley =

American soprano (born 1952)

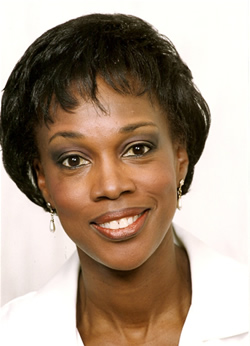

Background information
- Born: December 12, 1952 (age 73); New York City
- Origin: Bishopville, South Carolina
- Genres: Opera, concerts
- Occupations: Singer, voice teacher
- Instrument: Vocals

Gwendolyn Bradley (born December 12, 1952) is an American soprano who performed on many opera and concert stages worldwide.

== Early life ==
Bradley grew up in Bishopville, South Carolina as daughter of public school educators which were involved in the civil rights movement. After her high school music teacher recognized her talent, she received voice lessons at Coker College in Hartsville. Bradley was further trained at the University of North Carolina School of the Arts in Winston-Salem, the Curtis Institute of Music and the Academy of Vocal Arts in Philadelphia.

== Singing career ==
Bradley's debut was as Nannetta in Verdis's opera Falstaff at the Lake George Opera in 1976. After a very successful concert in New York in 1979 she established herself at the Metropolitan Opera, starting in 1981 as Nightingale in L'Enfant et les sortilèges (Ravel) and continuing for the next nine seasons singing such roles as Fiakermilli in Arabella, Blonde in Die Entführung aus dem Serail, Zerbinetta in Ariadne auf Naxos, Olympia in Les contes d'Hoffmann, the title role of Stravinsky's Le Rossignol, Clara in Porgy and Bess and especially as Gilda in Rigoletto. From her first appearance on March 20, 1977, to her last on January 27, 1990, Bradley sang in 108 performances at the Metropolitan Opera. She performed also in other American opera houses like Opera Memphis, the Michigan Opera Theatre and the Central City Opera. Bradley was a frequent guest on the stage of the Los Angeles Opera as Oscar, Blonde, Zerbinetta, Romilda (Serse), Zerlina (Don Giovanni), and in the 1997/98 season as Pamina in Die Zauberflöte.

She made her European debut in 1983 with the Dutch National Opera in the title role of Handel's Rodelinda. On European opera stages she performed beside other roles as Zerbinetta in Paris, Montpellier, Nice, Monte Carlo, as Susanna (The Marriage of Figaro) and Pamina in Madrid, as Blonde in Munich, as Adina (L'elisir d'amore), Blonde, Susanna, Zerbinetta in Hamburg, as Despina (Così fan tutte) in Barcelona, as Oscar (Un ballo in maschera) in Vienna, as Rodelinde in Amsterdam, and as Fiakermilli in Arabella at the Glyndebourne Festival Opera which was released as DVD from a recording of the 1984 season.

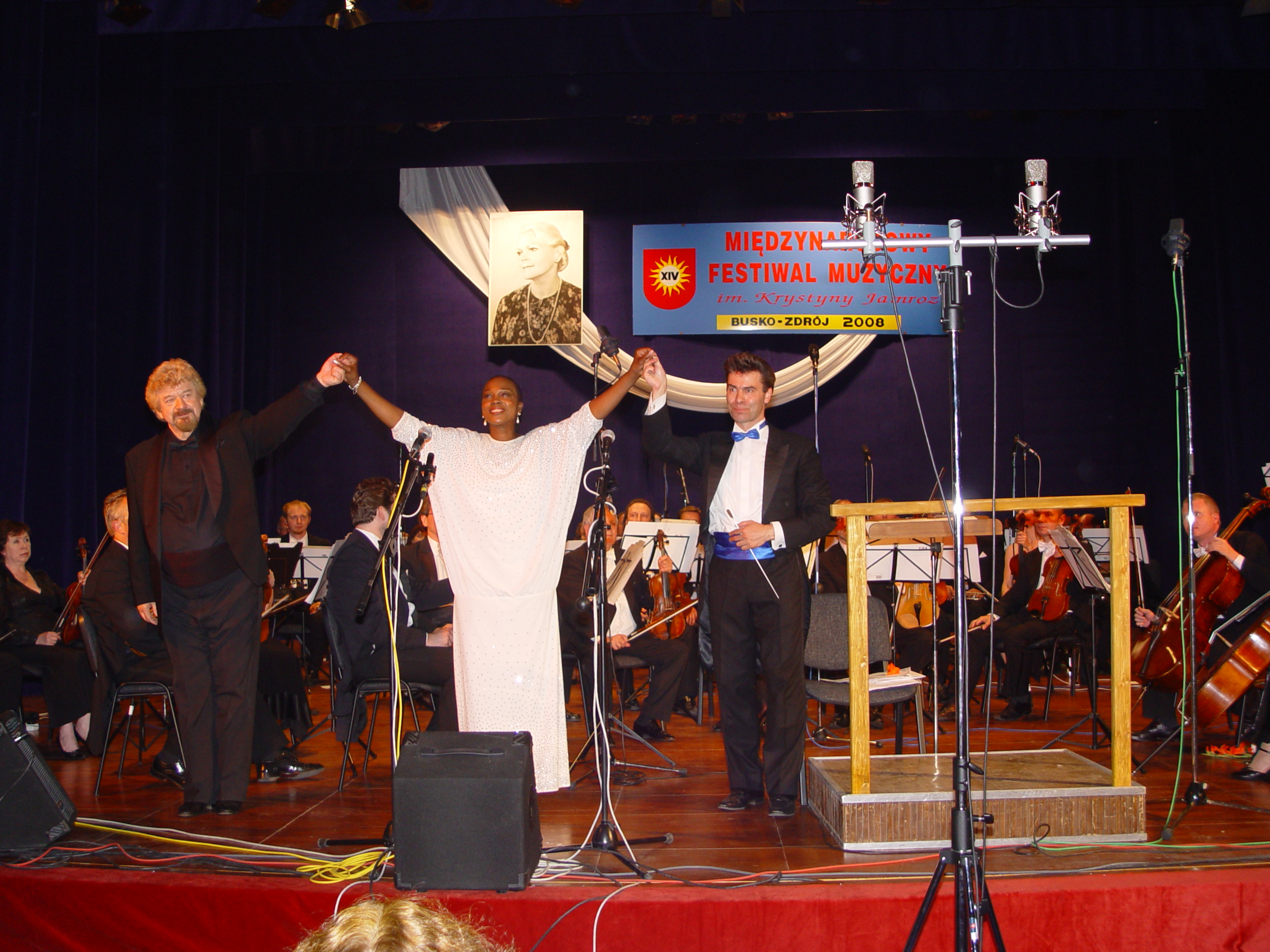
Bradley at the XIV. International Music Festival of Krystyna Jamroz, Poland, Busko-Zdrój, 1 July 2008

In 1988 she became a member of the Deutsche Oper Berlin where she made her debut in 1987 as Gilda in Verdi's Rigoletto. With her bell like voice, she was successful not only in female roles such as Gilda, Susanna, Nannetta, Sophie (Der Rosenkavalier) or Pamina but also the pert Blonde, as capricious Zerbinetta and Musetta (La bohème) or the androgynous Oscar.

As an accomplished concert singer, she has worked with such conductors as Zubin Mehta (New York Philharmonic/Israeli Symphony), Riccardo Muti (Philadelphia Orchestra), Mstislav Rostropovich and Rafael Frühbeck de Burgos (Washington National Symphony Orchestra), Charles Dutoit (Montreal Symphony Orchestra/Philadelphia Orchestra), André Previn (Pittsburgh Symphony Orchestra), Michael Tilson Thomas (Los Angeles Philharmonic), Marek Janowski, Hans Graf, Christopher Hogwood, Ralf Weikert, Víctor Pablo Pérez, and Lorin Maazel among others. Her concert repertoire encompasses important works from the Baroque to the 20th century and as a recitalist she performed in Paris, Tokyo, Lisbon, San Sebastian, Los Angeles and New York.

Bradley has recorded Fiakermilli in Arabella with Dame Kiri Te Kanawa, Jeffrey Tate conducting for Decca Records, Virgil Thomson's Four Saints in Three Acts for Nonesuch Records and a live concert recording of Mozart concert works, with members of the Orchestre symphonique français.

After returning to the United States, Bradley shared her expertise with young artists teaching at the Masters School (since September 2004) and the Nyack College (since September 2005) as vocal instructor. In 2010 Bradley served as judge at the Washington International Competition for Singers of the Friday Morning Music Club which she had won herself in 1977.

In 2014 Bradley performed at the XX International Music Festival Krystyna Jamroz in Busko-Zdrój, Poland, as she did on several occasions in previous years. During her stay she was honored on July 5, 2014, with a 'sun', a commemorative bronze plaque embedded in the Star's Promenade (similar to the Hollywood Walk of Fame) which is located in front of the Sanatorium Marconi in the Spa Park.

== Media ==
- Live from the Metropolitan Opera, season 12, episode 1: Les contes d'Hoffmann (2 March 1988)
- Glyndebourne Festival Opera: Arabella (BBC, 1984)
- Harfy Papuszy (symphonic poem by Jan Kanty Pawluśkiewicz, Antologia) (1995)
- Klassik Edition 8: NDR Radiophilharmonie, Bernstein–Gershwin-Gala (1997)
- R. Strauss: Arabella (Universal Music Classics & Jazz) (2012)
