= Mario Häring =

German pianist

Mario Häring (born November 1989) is a German pianist. In 2018, he won the second prize at the Leeds International Piano Competition.
