= Emma Tahmizian =

Bulgarian pianist of Armenian descent (born 1957)

Emma Tahmizian (born 13 December 1957, Plovdiv) is a Bulgarian pianist of Armenian descent.

She debuted at an international level at 11, representing Bulgaria at a concert series in Moscow. She has performed and recorded internationally regularly since she won the 1977 Robert Schumann Competition.

She was subsequently prized at the Tchaikovsky Competition (1982), the Leeds Competition (1984) and the Van Cliburn Competition (1985). Tahmizian premiered Sebastian Currier's Piano Concerto in April 2007.
