= Yuri Slesarev =

Russian pianist

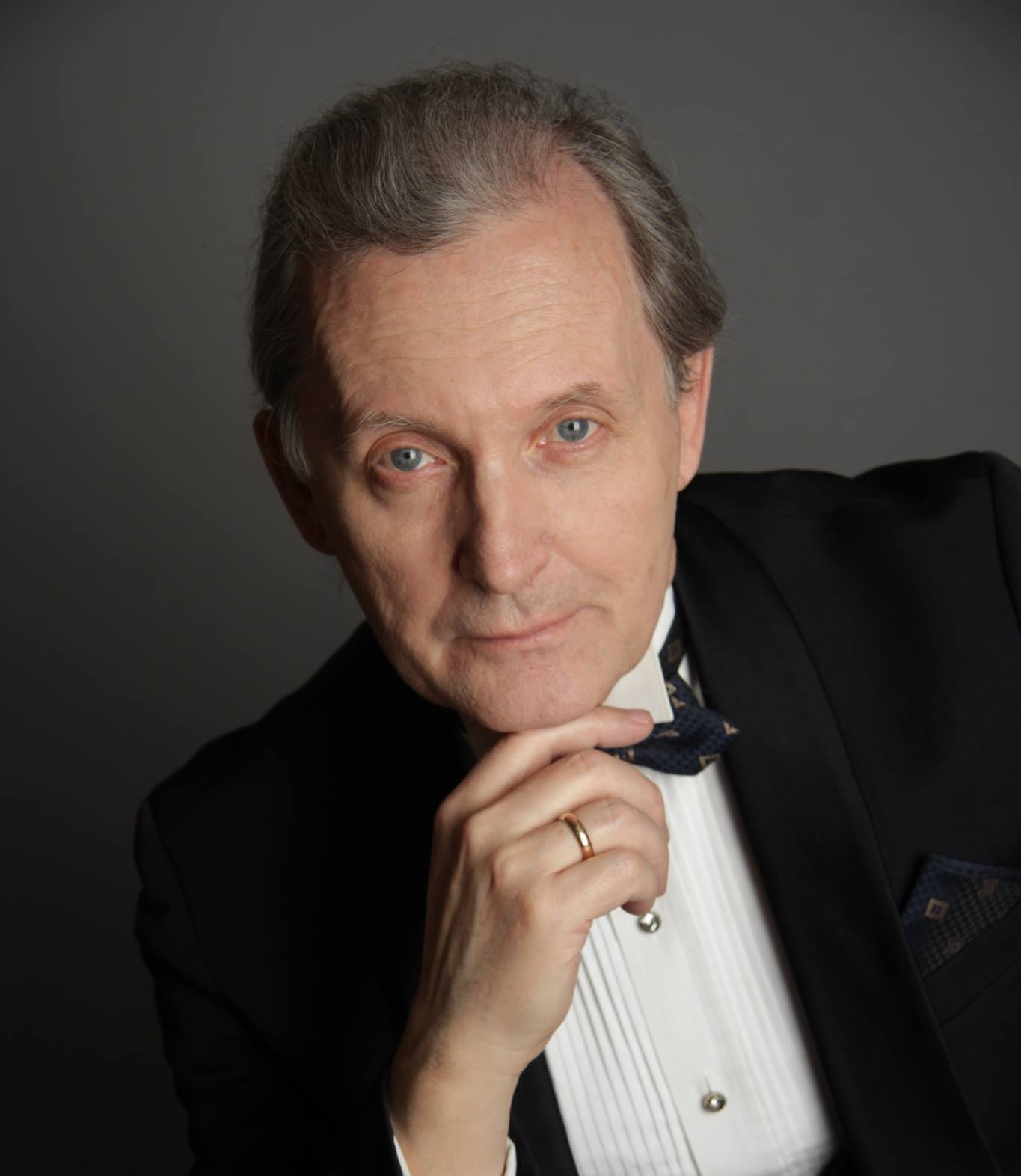
Yuri Slesarev

Yuri Slesarev (born 1947 died 10 May 2025) was a Russian pianist.

A graduate of Moscow Conservatory's Central Music School, he studied piano under Victor Merzhanov. After winning the All-Union Piano Competition in Tallinn in 1969, he took part in several international contests, winning the 1972 Montevideo Competition. He was active as a concert pianist through Europe and South America in subsequent years.

Slesarev is a People's Artist of Russia, and now teaches at the Moscow Conservatory. His pupils have included Vitaly Pisarenko and Vyacheslav Gryaznov.
