= Pavel Egorov =

Russian pianist and scholar

- Russian: Павел Григорьевич Егоров
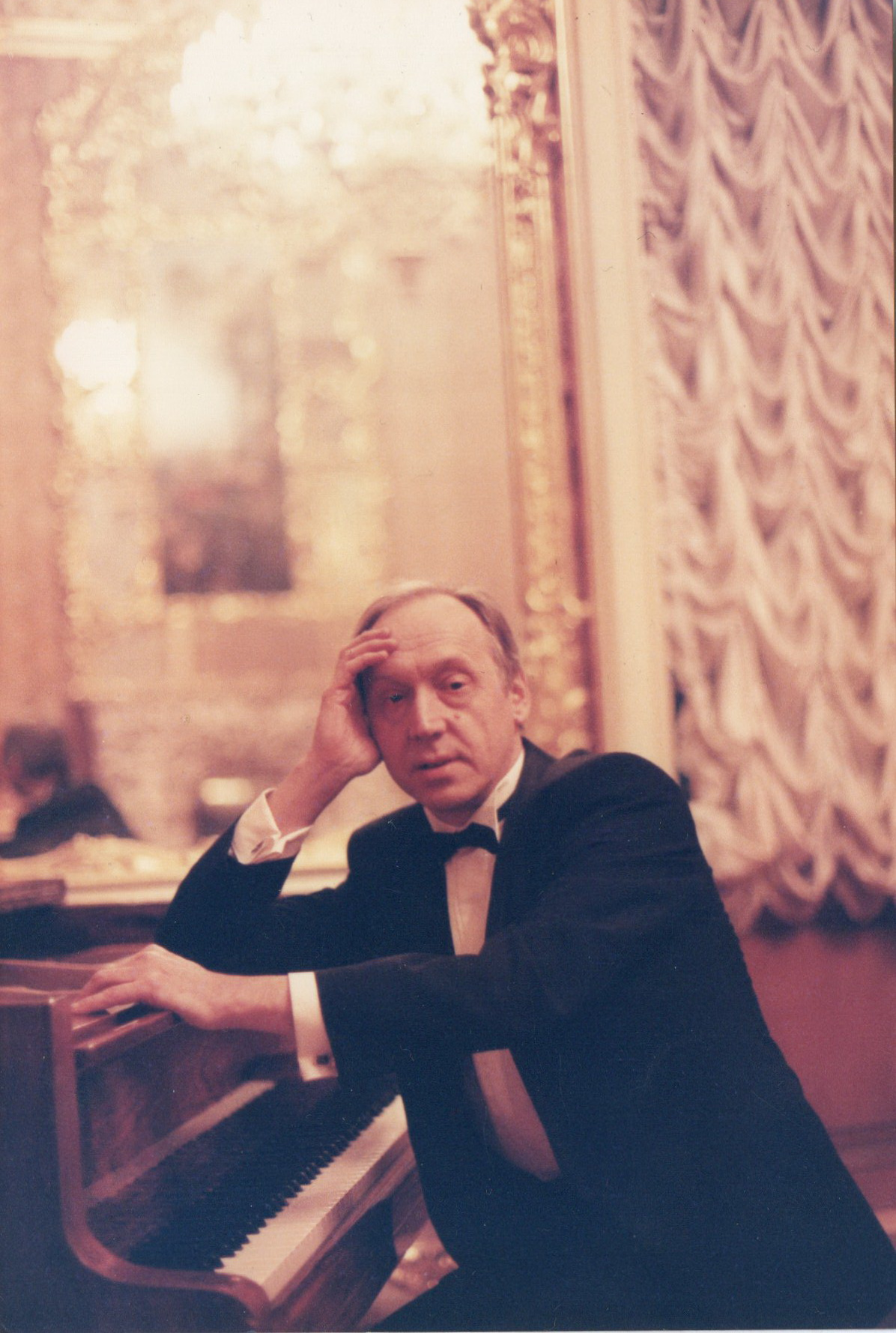
- 2017
- Born: Pavel Grigorievich Egorov; 8 January 1948; Leningrad
- Died: 15 August 2017 (aged 69); Saint-Petersburg
- Education: Moscow Conservatory

Pavel Grigorievich Egorov (Russian: Павел Григорьевич Его́ров; 8 January 1948 – 15 August 2017) was a Russian pianist and scholar.

== Life and career ==
He won the VI Robert Schumann Competition before graduating in 1975 from the Moscow Conservatory. He has performed widely at an international level since (ca. 3000 performances). He was a professor and the Head of the Piano Department at the Saint Petersburg Conservatory, where he taught from 1980 until his death.

Pavel Egorov was named a Meritorious Artist of the Russian Federation, and was a member of Saint Petersburg branch of the Russian Academy of Natural Sciences, and an Honorary Member at the Robert Schumann Society in Düsseldorf and the Saint Petersburg Philharmonic Society. The scientific editor of the first Russian edition of Robert Schumann's complete piano works (Muzyka, 1986), he was awarded the Robert Schumann Prize of the City of Zwickau in 1989.

He died of cancer on 15 August 2017 at the age of 69.
