= Federico Colli =

Italian classical pianist

- Born: August 10, 1988 (age 38); Brescia, Lombardy- Italy
- Education: Milan Conservatory; Imola International Piano Academy; Salzburg Mozarteum
- Occupations: Concert pianist and Professor SUM Conservatorio della Svizzera italiana in Lugano
- Label: Chandos Records
- Awards: First Prize Salzburg Mozart Competition (2011) - First Prize and Gold Medal Leeds International Piano Competition (2012)
- Website: www.federicocolli.eu

Federico Colli is an Italian classical pianist. He won the First Prize at the Salzburg Mozart Competition in 2011 and the First Prize with Gold Medal at The Leeds International Piano Competition in 2012. After this victory, The Independent wrote: "Beautiful pianism with wonderful tone; very sensitive to nuances, voicing and atmosphere; intelligent, energetic and never heavy-handed."

== Career ==
In 2014, the British magazine International Piano has selected him as “one of the 30 pianists under 30 who are likely to dominate the world stage in years to come.”
Since then, he has performed internationally with major orchestras, chamber ensembles, renowned conductors and at prominent venues and festivals, getting great reviews.
Over the years, he has received increasing recognition for his unconventional interpretative approach, with critics highlighting his clarity of sound and distinctive musical perspective. Gramophone wrote: ”There’s no doubt that Federico Colli is one of the more original thinkers of his generation.”
He was a member of the jury at the Ferruccio Busoni International Piano Competition in Bolzano (2021) and "Premio Venezia" National Piano Competition (2026).

== Education ==
He has been studying at the Milan Conservatory, Imola International Piano Academy and Salzburg Mozarteum, under the guidance of Sergio Marengoni, Konstantin Bogino, Boris Petrushansky and Pavel Gililov.

== Awards and recognition ==
The second volume entirely dedicated to Scarlatti's Sonatas (CHANDOS 20134) was chosen by Classical Music-BBC Music Magazine as one of the best classical album released in 2020: ”This is a superb release from the most scintillating and personal of all young artists.” (International Piano).
He received from the Municipality of Brescia the "Grosso d'Argento" as a prize for the international prestige given to his hometown and the Music Section of the UK Critics’ Circle included him among the recipients of its 2018 Awards for the following reason: "His exceptional control of sonority, voicing and colour is placed at the service of an individual imagination that casts new light on the music while staying essentially true to the composer.".
Furthermore, in 2023 Fortune Italia Magazine selected him as one of the most influential “40 under 40” of the Italian culture and on June 2, 2026 he was awarded the honorific title of "Cavaliere dell’Ordine al Merito della Repubblica Italiana" as recognition of his acquired merits to the Italian Nation in the field of art.
