= Vitaly Pisarenko =

Ukrainian pianist

Vitaly Pisarenko Віталій Писаренко
- Born: 24 July 1987 (age 38); Kiev, Ukrainian SSR, Soviet Union
- Genres: Classical
- Occupation: Pianist
- Instrument: Piano
- Years active: 2008–present
- Website: pisarenkovitaly.com

Vitaly Pisarenko (Note: Ukrainian: Віталій Писаренко, romanized: Vitalii Pysarenko) (born 24 July 1987) is a Ukrainian pianist. He was the winner of the International Franz Liszt Piano Competition in 2008.

Vitaly Pisarenko was born in Kiev, and performed for the first time in public when he was six years old. He studied in Kharkiv and Kyiv, and in 2005 entered the Professor Yuri Slesarev's class at the Moscow State Conservatory. He also studied at the Rotterdam Conservatory Codarts, under Aquiles Delle Vigne.

Pisarenko has performed as a soloist in Russia, Italy, North Macedonia, Austria, the Netherlands and Germany. He won first prize at the "Inter Fest Bitola" competition in Dnevnik (North Macedonia) in October 2005. He also won the 3rd prize, the audience prize and the special prize of Fazıl Say at the 5th Franz Liszt Competition in Weimar in 2006. In addition, he won the International Piano Competition "Citta di Trani" in Italy. In 2008, he was the winner of the International Franz Liszt Piano Competition in Utrecht.

In 2015, Pisarenko was a finalist at the Leeds International Piano Competition in the UK, finishing in third place.
