= Heejae Kim =

South Korean classical pianist

- Hangul: 김희재
- RR: Gim Huijae
- MR: Kim Hŭijae

Heejae Kim (also Hee-jae; born c. 1987) is a South Korean classical pianist. She won the Terence Judd–Hallé Orchestra Prize in the Leeds International Piano Competition in 2015, and was placed second overall.

== Biography ==
Kim studied at the Hochschule für Musik und Theater "Felix Mendelssohn Bartholdy" in Leipzig, Germany, graduating in 2013. Her teachers include Gerald Fauth. She made her debut at the Prodigy Concert Series of the Kumho Asiana Cultural Foundation, and has given recitals in Brussels, Leeds, Leipzig, Paris and Seoul. Her repertoire includes Bach, Beethoven, Brahms, Chopin and Liszt.

She was placed second at the UNISA International Piano Competition, South Africa (2012) and third at the International Piano Competition, San Marino, Italy (2013). In 2015, she was awarded the second prize at the Leeds International Piano Competition, and also won the Terence Judd–Hallé Orchestra Prize.

== Critical reception ==
Kim's performance of Beethoven's Piano Concerto no. 4 in the Leeds Piano Competition's final round was described as the audience's favourite. The Guardian's music critic, Andrew Clements described Kim as being "genial, engaging", and added that "[s]he was utterly absorbed in the music in every bar." The BBC Radio 3 commentator, Lucy Parham, praised her "thoughtful and stylish rendition", and wrote: "She particularly shone in the second and third movements and will definitely be a name to watch." Murray Mclachlan, writing in the International Piano magazine, described her performance as "energised and experienced" ... "assured, fluent and articulate in the outer movements, while the second movement showed conviction and control: there was a real sense of presence in this movement's solo passages. Perhaps her literal approach to accents and sforzandi in the first movement could be questioned, and the finale needed at least a little more energy and sparkle, but overall this was extremely assured interpretation." He also commented that, in an earlier round, "she had stamped real authority and vision into a blistering account of Liszt's Fantasy and Fugue on BACH."
