= Friday Morning Music Club =

Musical organization in Washington, D.C., United States

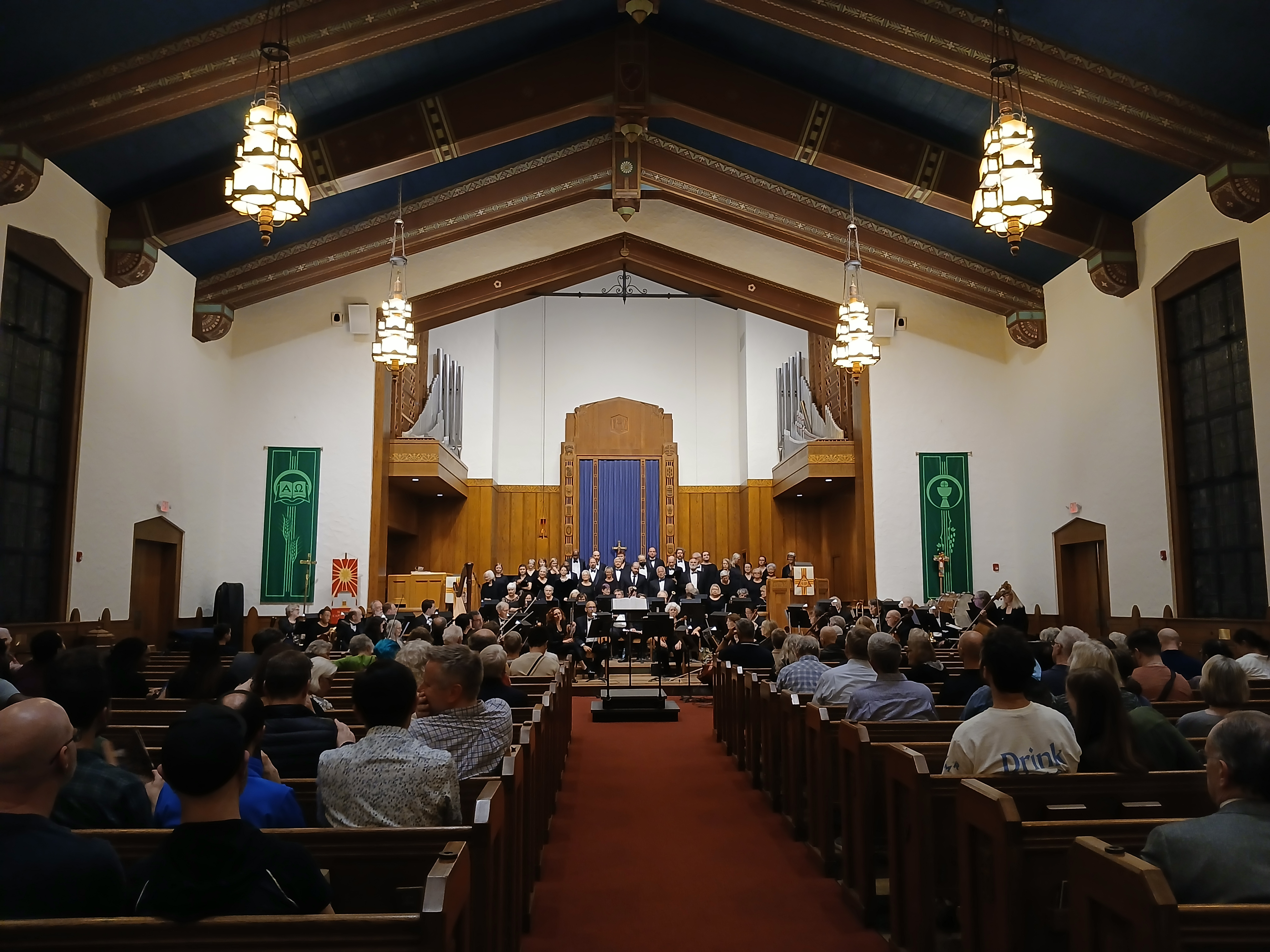
Members of the Arioso Chorale and Orchestra during a concert at Lutheran Church of the Reformation

The Friday Morning Music Club originated in Washington, D.C. in the mid-1880s as an informal club for the study of music. Members of the club were required to audition to become a part of the club, and had to take part in musical performances. Early activities included reading from musical periodicals, the creation of a musical library, the creation of a lecture series, and the hosting of other musical groups for their DC performances.

Over the years, the club grew in size, and requirements for membership became more rigorous. In 1894, the club was incorporated in the District of Columbia, and the headquarters moved from the various members’ homes to the music room of the Washington Club, located at 1710 I Street. As the club has grown over the years, it has been located in various places, including the Assembly room of the Cosmos Club, the Raleigh Hotel, and the Charles Sumner School. Today, its archives are located at the Historical Society of Washington, D.C., 801 K St., N.W., Washington, D.C., and its primary location for meetings and programs is First Congregational United Church of Christ in Washington, D.C.

The period from 1943-1949 was extremely active, and included the formation of groups of different categories, including pianists, singers, organists, composers and others who met on a regular basis to study and to listen to their own performances. Additionally, during this period, Miss Gretchen Hood, the opera singer, bequeathed money in her will to assist promising young musicians in their concert careers. This was the beginning of The Friday Morning Music Club Foundation, which was incorporated March 22, 1948, to help aspiring musical students.

In 1970, Foundation Director Willa Mae Koehn moved to change the name of the National Auditions to the Washington International Competition (WIC), and the first competition under this name was held for singers on April 23 and 24, 1971. Over the years, notable winners have included: Jessye Norman, Gwendolyn Bradley, Robert Kerns, William Cochran, Jane Coop, (who was also a judge of the competition), Sofya Gulyak, Cynthia Clarey, Jennifer Frautschi, Gil Morgenstern, Ralph Kirshbaum, Toby Saks and Jie Chen.

The Foundation continues to hold annual competitions alternating among pianists, singers, string players and composers, and grants awards. It draws its applicants from all over the world. The most recent Washington International Competition, for strings and composition, was held in May 2025 at the John F. Kennedy Center for the Performing Arts. The competition for voice will be held in 2026, and piano in 2027. The Foundation also holds the Johansen International Competition for Young String Players (JIC) every three years; contestants are ages 13-17. The next JIC will be held in 2028.
