= Fanny Waterman =

English musician (1920–2020)

Dame Fanny Waterman DBE
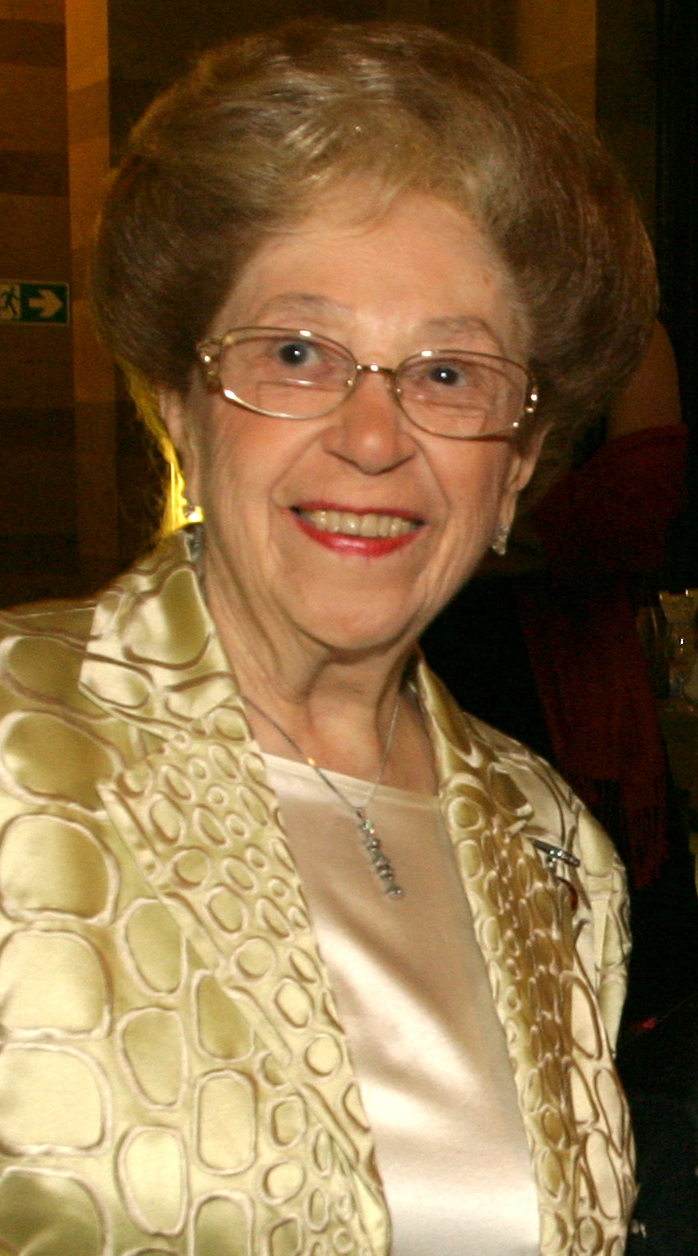
- Waterman in 2009
- Born: 22 March 1920; Leeds, England
- Died: 20 December 2020 (aged 100); Ilkley, West Yorkshire, England
- Occupations: Pianist; Academic teacher; Music competition administrator

Chair and artistic director of the Leeds International Piano Competition
- In office 1961–2015

Dame Fanny Waterman DBE (22 March 1920 – 20 December 2020) was a British pianist and academic piano teacher, who is particularly known as the founder, chair and artistic director of the Leeds International Piano Competition. She was also president of the Harrogate International Music Festival.

== Early life, education and career as pianist ==
Waterman was born in Leeds to Mary (née Behrmann) and Myer Waterman (né Wasserman), a Russian Jew who had emigrated to England to work as a jeweller. She attended Allerton High School and began to study with Tobias Matthay. She won a scholarship to the Royal College of Music where she studied with Cyril Smith.

She started giving public performances, and in 1941 opened the concert season in Leeds with the Leeds Symphony Society. The following year, she appeared at The Proms as one of the soloists playing the Bach Concerto for three harpsichords in C major (BWV 1064), conducted by Sir Adrian Boult, but her concert career was disrupted by the Second World War. She played duos with the violinist Erich Gruenberg.

== Leeds International Piano Competition ==
By the early 1960s, Waterman felt that young British pianists needed a goal to give them a competitive edge over overseas pianists. In 1961, jointly with her pianist friend Marion, Countess of Harewood (later Marion Thorpe), and Roslyn Lyons, she founded the Leeds International Piano Competition. She was artistic director of the competition and, from 1981, chair of the competition jury, holding the posts until 2015. Finalists of the competition who began an international career based on it include Radu Lupu, Murray Perahia, Sunwook Kim, Federico Colli, Eric Lu, András Schiff, Mitsuko Uchida, Lars Vogt and Denis Kozhukhin.

She was a jury member for other international piano competitions, including the Tchaikovsky, Chopin, the Horowitz and the Paloma O'Shea International Piano Competition.

== Teaching, writing and societies ==
Waterman's notable students include Paul Crossley, Jonathan Dunsby, Benjamin Frith, Michael Roll and Allan Schiller; Roll won the inaugural Leeds competition and her students were also successful in other international competitions. She held strong views on piano pedagogy in the UK, blaming electronic keyboards, interruptive mobile phones and insufficient discipline for what she perceived as the country's weakness in generating top-class performers.

She published a number of piano instruction books. This included the 30-volume Me and My Piano series, which was co-authored with Thorpe, and sold more than 2 million copies worldwide. She co-wrote Piano Competition: The Story of the Leeds with Wendy Thompson (1990). Her autobiography, My Life in Music, was published in 2015.

She was Director of the Postgraduate Certificate in Advanced Piano Performance at Leeds College of Music until 2006, and a patron of The Purcell School for Young Musicians. She served as honorary vice-president of the British Society of Women Musicians and honorary president of the Harrogate International Festivals from 2009.

== Personal life and death ==
In 1944, she married Geoffrey de Keyser, a doctor, and in 1950, with the arrival of her first child, gave up her concert career and concentrated on teaching. They had two sons; Paul de Keyser became a musician and music author. Geoffrey de Keyser died in 2001.

She was a guest for BBC Radio Four's Desert Island Discs in July 2010. Although then aged 90, she was still teaching masterclasses and continued to be involved with every detail of the Leeds competition. "They call me Field Marshal Fanny" she said, "I am a busy breeches."

She donated her papers and memorabilia to the library of the University of Leeds in November 2017.

Waterman turned 100 on 22 March 2020. She died at a care home in Ilkley on 20 December 2020.

== Honours and awards ==
Waterman was appointed OBE in 1971, CBE in 2001 and DBE in the 2005 New Year Honours. She was also awarded the degree of Doctor of Music (DMus) honoris causa by the University of Leeds in 1992, and also received honorary degrees from Leeds Metropolitan University and the University of York. Her contribution to the city of Leeds was further recognised in April 2006, when she was given the Freedom of the City. Her name is one of those featured on the sculpture Ribbons, unveiled in 2024.
