= Balázs Szokolay =

Hungarian pianist

Balázs Szokolay (Hungarian: [ˈbɒlaːʒ ˈsokolɒj]; born 2 July 1961) is a Hungarian pianist.

Szokolay was born in Budapest. His father is Hungarian composer Sándor Szokolay. His international concert career started in 1983, when he replaced Nikita Magaloff at a concert in Belgrade. Four years later he was appointed a professorship at the Franz Liszt Academy of Music. Throughout his career he has been awarded 14 competition prizes (Zwickau's Robert Schumann, Leeds', Brussels' Queen Elisabeth, Munich's ARD, Terni's Alessandro Casagrande, Monza's Rina Sala Gallo, etc.).

In 2001 the Hungarian Government awarded him the Liszt Prize.
