= Michael Roll (pianist) =

British pianist

Michael Roll (born 1946) is an English classical pianist, winner of the first Leeds International Piano Competition in 1963.

Roll, born in the UK to Viennese Jewish parents, was a child prodigy who performed on the concert platform with the City of Birmingham Orchestra at the age of ten and at the Royal Festival Hall aged twelve under the direction of Sir Malcolm Sargent. Roll won the Leeds Piano Competition aged only seventeen, while still a pupil at Roundhay School. As of 2016, he remains the competition's youngest winner.

His success at Leeds led to appearances worldwide, working with conductors such as Boulez, Boult, Giulini, Haitink, Masur, Previn, Sawallisch, Sanderling and more recently Gergiev and Steinberg. In 1973 he completed an acclaimed tour of Southern Africa. Orchestras have included the London Symphony, London Philharmonic, Royal Liverpool Philharmonic, Royal Philharmonic, BBC Symphony, Leipzig Gewandhaus and Boston Symphony Orchestras, with the last of which Roll made his American debut in 1974 under Sir Colin Davis. International festivals have included Vienna, Edinburgh, Hong Kong and Aldeburgh, where he performed together with Benjamin Britten. He has also appeared on sixteen occasions at the Promenade Concerts at the Royal Albert Hall in London.

Roll is married to pianist Juliana Markova, and they have one son, Maximilian.
