= Armenta Adams =

American musician

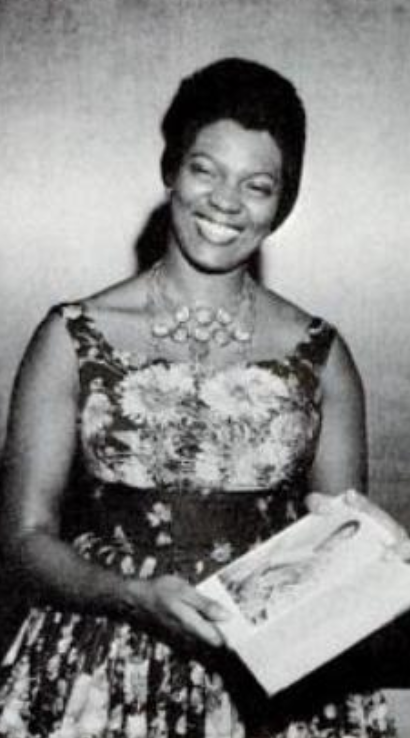
Armenta Adams, from a 1961 publication of the U.S. State Department

Armenta Adams (Hummings) Dumisani (born 1936) is an American concert pianist and music educator who since 1960 has performed in the United States and, thanks to an international relations award from the U.S. State Department, in 27 other countries. In 1993, she founded the Gateways Music Festival which promotes the achievements of young African-American classical musicians. A former associate professor of music at the Eastman School of Music in Rochester, New York, in 1994 she was appointed Eastman's Distinguished Community Mentor.

== Biography ==
Born on 27 June 1936 in Cleveland, Ohio, Armenta Adams was the daughter of Albert and Estella Adams, both of whom loved classical music. She was brought up in Cleveland together with her elder brother Elwyn, in a house her father built himself - as Adams put it, "brick by brick". From the age of four, she took piano lessons at the New England Conservatory in Boston, Massachusetts, while Elwyn (c.1933–1995) was taught the violin, later becoming an accomplished violinist. From 1954, she studied piano at the Juilliard School in New York under Sascha Gorodnitzki, earning both Bachelor and Master of Science degrees.

Adams made her debut at the New York Town Hall in 1960, later performing at Carnegie Hall, Avery Fisher Hall, Alice Tully Hall and the Metropolitan Museum of Art. She has performed across Europe under the Martha Baird Rockefeller Aid to Music award and in Africa, South America, India and Pakistan thanks to an international relations award from the U.S. State Department.

Now divorced, Adams has four sons, the violist Amadi Azikiwe (born 1969), the naval officer Gus Jr., and Martin (an educator) and Marcus (a psychologist) who are identical twins.
