= Anna Tsybuleva =

Russian classical pianist

Anna Tsybuleva (also Tcybuleva; born 12 August 1990) is a Russian classical pianist. She won the Leeds International Piano Competition in 2015. As of 2022, she has released two recordings, including a performance of the Brahms Piano Concerto no. 2 with the Deutsches Symphonie-Orchester Berlin.

== Early life and education ==
Tsybuleva was born in 1990. Her mother, Svetlana Tsybuleva, was a musician and art historian, and her father, a radio physicist. Tsybuleva was raised in Nizhny Arkhyz in Karachay-Cherkessia, Russia. She played the piano from the age of six, at first taught by her mother, and also briefly played the violin. She attended the Shostakovich Music School in Volgodonsk (2000–3) and the Moscow Central Music School (2003–9). In 2009, she went to the Moscow Conservatory (in the class of professor Ludmila Roschina), graduating in 2014 and starting post-graduate study there, as well as at the City of Basel Music Academy (in the class of Claudio Martinez Mehner) in Switzerland. Her teachers include Elena Vorobyova, Ludmila Roschina and the Spanish pianist, Claudio Martínez Mehner.

== Career and awards ==
Tsybuleva has won several Russian piano competitions including the Russian National Piano Competition at Rostov (2001), the International Piano Competition at Murmansk (2002) and the Nasedkin International Piano Competition at Yaroslavl. She won the International Piano Competition SEILER at Kitzingen, Germany (2003) and the International Piano Competition at Ibla, Italy (2011). In 2012, she won the Emil Gilels International Piano Competition at Odesa, Ukraine, and also came fourth in the Hamamatsu International Piano Competition in Japan. In 2015, she won the Leeds International Piano Competition in the UK, the second woman to do so.

She has performed internationally with orchestras including the Tokyo Symphony Orchestra, Royal Philharmonic Orchestra and The Hallé, as well as with Russian orchestras including the Saint Petersburg Philharmonic Orchestra.

== Critical reception ==
The British conductor, Mark Elder, called Tsybuleva "a truly exciting winner" of the Leeds competition. The Guardian's music critic, Andrew Clements, considered that her "success certainly raised a few eyebrows" and criticised her performance of Brahms's Piano Concerto no. 2, writing that "for all the fluency of her playing, she often seemed incapable of seeing the overall shape of the work, and her role in projecting it, rather than the detail of each passing moment." Erica Worth, editor of the magazine Pianist, considered her performance failed to deliver the "warmth, gravitas, a certain humility, a feeling that one has lived, not to mention a velvety rich tone and utter command over the keyboard" that the concerto requires. The BBC Radio 3 commentator, Lucy Parham, praised her "mature, elegant and communicative reading of this hugely demanding work".

Murray Mclachlan, writing in the International Piano magazine, described her as a "born performer" with "unquestionable qualities as an artist"; he considered that her performance of the Brahms concerto "perhaps lacked gravitas" but added: "there was no doubt that she was thoroughly enjoying every minute. The work was taken by the scruff of the neck and executed with energetic elan, bravura and heart-on-sleeve communication." Mclachlan also praised "her spellbinding, exquisite sounds" in performing Debussy's Préludes.

Commenting on a 2016 recital, the British pianist, Peter Donohoe, called Tsybuleva "one of the very finest young musicians of her generation". He commented on her "unerring sense of breathing and space and an instinct for tempo-appropriatenes in relation to her approach to sound and phrase", and praised the "imagination and integrity" of her interpretations of Schumann's Etudes Symphoniques and Prokofiev's 10 pieces Op 12.

In a Telegraph review of a 2018 performance of Schumann's piano concerto with the Royal Liverpool Philharmonic Orchestra, David Fanning writes that Tsybuleva can "float long, lyrical lines with a cushioned singing tone" and "blend rippling passagework with the orchestra", but characterises her playing as "predictable and short on fantasy", and concludes that she "could benefit from scaling up her musical intentions".

== Recordings ==
Tsybuleva's debut recording of fantasies by C. P. E. Bach, Beethoven, Schubert and Brahms was released in 2017. Jed Distler, in a review for Gramophone magazine, praises her "superb pianism and intelligent musicianship", although notes "a little more drive and ferocity" would have improved the fugue of Schubert's Wanderer Fantasy. Peter Burwasser, in a review for Fanfare magazine, describes her playing as "thoughtful, elegant, yet exciting".

In 2021, Tsybuleva released a recording of Brahms' second piano concerto; Huntley Dent, in a review for Fanfare, notes a lack of power compared with some male pianists, but praised the "unflagging momentum and powerful technique" of the Scherzo, the "poetry" of the faster-than-usually paced Andante, and the "especially animated reading filled with brio" of the finale. Donald R. Vroon, in a more-critical review for the American Record Guide, states that her playing lacked "weight and grandeur" and was instead "almost French and delicate".

== Discography ==
Year	Title	Composer	Record company	Reference	Other performers
2017	Fantasie in F sharp minor, H.300; Phantasie, Op.77; Fantasy in C major Wanderer-Fantasie, D.760; Fantasien, Op.116	C. P. E Bach; Beethoven; Schubert; Brahms	Champs Hill Records	CHRCD131	
2021	Piano Concerto No. 2 Capriccios: in F♯ minor, op. 76/1; in B minor, op. 76/2; in C, op. 76/8; Intermezzos: in E♭, op. 117/1; in A, op. 118/2	Brahms	Signum Records	Signum 674	Deutsches Symphonie-Orchester Berlin, conducted by Ruth Reinhardt
