= Han Tong-il =

South Korean pianist (1941–2024)

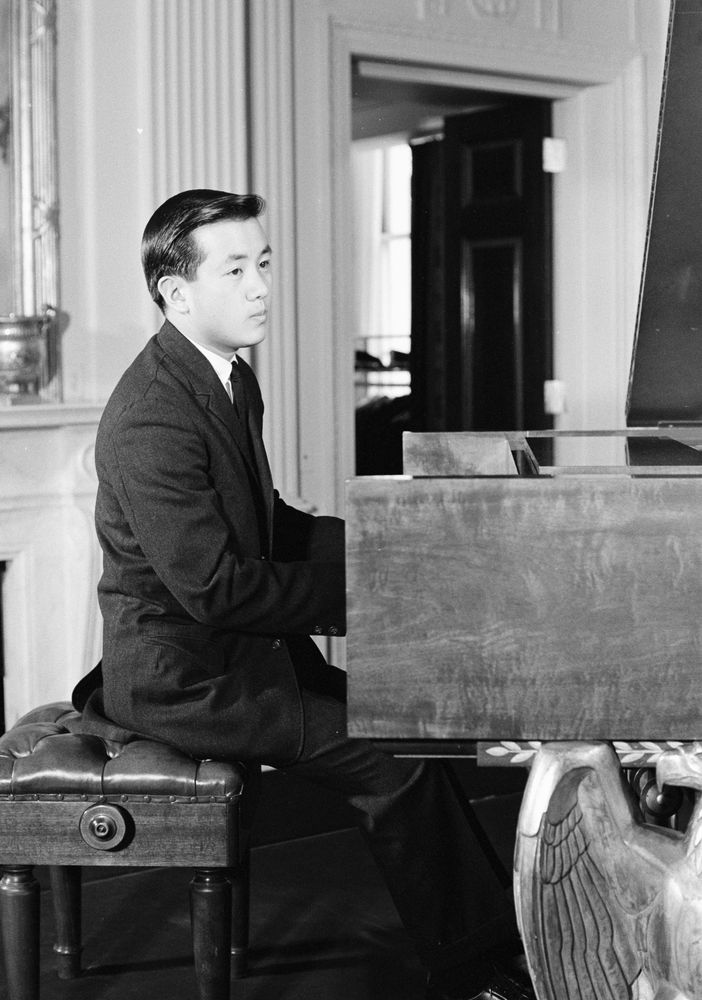
- Han performs at the White House, 1962
- Born: 1941; Hamhung, Korea, Empire of Japan
- Died: December 29, 2024 (aged 83)
- Occupation: Pianist

Korean name
- Hangul: 한동일
- Hanja: 韓東一
- RR: Han Dongil
- MR: Han Tongil

Han Tong-il (Korean: 한동일; December 4, 1941 – December 29, 2024) was a South Korean pianist.

== Background ==
Han was born in Kankō (now Hamhung, North Korea), Korea, Empire of Japan. He began learning the piano and musical composition from his father at the age of 4. He fled south during the Korean War, ending up in Seoul. He was a guest on the classic American game show, I've Got a Secret, hosted by Steve Allen. Han's secret was that, as a young child, he was discovered by Staff Sergeant JJ "Mike" Egan during the Korean War, and General Samuel E. Anderson arranged a tour at the US bases in Japan where they raised money for the young child.

Han died on December 29, 2024, at the age of 83.

== Musical career ==
Han left South Korea on June 1, 1954. He went to the US with General Anderson to attend Juilliard, where his teachers included Rosina Lhévinne. In 1965, at 23, he won the prestigious Leventritt Competition.

Han had performed with many of the finest orchestras around the world, among them the New York Philharmonic, Chicago Symphony, Los Angeles Philharmonic, Cleveland Orchestra, Detroit Symphony, London Philharmonic, Royal Philharmonic, Scottish National Orchestra, Oslo Philharmonic, Monte Carlo Orchestra, Rotterdam Philharmonic, Polish Radio National Orchestra, Budapest Radio Symphony Orchestra, and Russian National Symphony, among many others. The conductors with whom he had collaborated include Bernard Haitink, Herbert Blomstedt, Edo de Waart, Rafael Frühbeck de Burgos, Charles Dutoit, Lukas Foss, Eugen Jochum, Raymond Leppard, Robert Shaw, Stanisław Skrowaczewski, and David Zinman.

Since his return to South Korea, Han had performed throughout his homeland as a soloist performing with numerous orchestras, among them KBS Symphony Orchestra, Seoul Philharmonic Orchestra, and Daegu Philaharmonic Orchestra. As a distinguished chamber musician, Han participated in the Seoul Spring Festival, as well as collaborated with highly accomplished young musicians.

Han's several recordings include Chopin's Twenty-Four Preludes, Four Ballades and Four Scherzos, eight Sonatas by Beethoven (including the last five), Sonatas by Schubert and Brahms, and a group of shorter piano works under the title "Music I Love To Play". He also has recorded Sonatas for Cello and Piano by Brahms, and Schumann's Fantasy Pieces with cellist Leslie Parnas. The CD titled "The Kennedy White House Concert" (the live concert given at the White House) has been released. In this concert recording Han performed Debussy's "Reflet dans l'eau" and electrifying performance of the Liszt's "Mephisto Waltz". His latest CD released in June 2004 was recorded in Rome. This includes major works by Schumann, Beethoven, and Brahms.

== Academic career ==
Han went on to teach in the music departments of Indiana University, Illinois State University, University of North Texas and Boston University. He returned to Korea in 2005, where he served first as dean of the college of music and then as chair professor of music at University of Ulsan. He has also served as guest professor at Elisabeth University of Music in Hiroshima, Japan. In March 2007 he began teaching at Suncheon University, Suncheon, Korea.
