= Boris Petrushansky =

- Борис Петрушанский
- Born: 3 June 1949 (age 76); Moscow, Russia
- Education: Moscow Conservatory
- Occupation: pianist

Boris Petrushansky (born 3 June 1949 in Moscow) is a Russian-Italian pianist.

Petrushansky started an intercontinental concert career in the mid-1970s after graduating from the Moscow Conservatory. Among his teachers were Heinrich Neuhaus and Lev Naumov. After the collapse of the Soviet Union he settled in Italy.

Petrushansky's recordings of Shostakovich's complete piano solo music have received generally favorable reviews.

He teaches at the Imola Piano Academy.
