= Chung (surname) =

Chung is a surname whose bearers are generally people of Chinese or Korean descent. It is also a Vietnamese surname worn by people of Chinese descent but is very rare in Vietnam; the surname is known as Zhong (trad/simp: 鍾/锺) in Mandarin Chinese, Jong (鍾/종), Jong (宗/종), and Jung (鄭/정) in Korean, and Chung in Vietnam, Taiwan and Hong Kong.

- Chung or Zhong (surname), /ˈdʒoʊŋ/ is a transliteration of several Chinese surnames, including Zhōng (鍾/锺 or 钟), Zhòng (种, mistakenly for Chóng, cf. zh:种姓) and Zhòng (仲), etc.. These are transliterated as Chung (especially in Taiwan, Hong Kong and Malaysia). Sometimes it is transliterated as Cheong or Choong in Malaysia.
- Chung or Cheung, a Cantonese romanization of several Chinese surnames, including 張/张 (Jyutping: Zoeng1; Pinyin: Zhāng; Wade–Giles: Chang), and 章. Sometimes, 蔣 (蒋) is also spelled as Cheung instead of Chiang/Jiang due to its Cantonese pronunciation.
- Jeong (Korean surname), a Latin alphabet rendition of the Korean family name "정" (hanja: 鄭, 丁, 程), sometimes also spelled as Chung, Jung, or Jong.

Notable people with the surname include:

== Korean ==
- Chi Hyun Chung (born 1970), South Korean–Bolivian doctor, evangelical pastor and politician
- Chung Chung-hoon (born 1970), South Korean cinematographer and filmmaker
- Chung Dong-kee (born 1949), South Korean volleyball player
- Chung Eui-sun (born 1970), South Korean businessman
- Chung Eui-yong (born 1946), South Korean diplomat and politician
- Chung Han-ah (born 1982), South Korean novelist
- Chung Hong-won (born 1944), South Korean politician and prosecutor
- Chung Hwang-keun (born 1961), South Korean politician
- Chung Hyeon (born 1996), South Korean tennis player
- Chung Il-kwon (1917–1994), South Korean politician, diplomat and soldier
- Chung Jung-yong (born 1969), South Korean football manager and former player
- Chung Ju-yung (1915–2001), South Korean businessman
- Chung Mong-hun (1948–2003), South Korean businessman
- Chung Mong-joon (born 1951), South Korean businessman and politician
- Chung Mong-koo (born 1938), South Korean businessman
- Chung Sye-kyun (born 1950), South Korean politician
- Chung Yong-jin (born 1968), South Korean businessman
- Chung Yoo-ra (born 1996), South Korean equestrian
- Jamie Chung (born 1983), Korean-American actress
- Clara Chung (born 1987), Korean-American singer and songwriter
- David Chung (golfer) (born 1990), Korean-American golfer
- Doo-Ri Chung (born 1973), Korean-American fashion designer
- Eugene Chung (born 1969), Korean-American football player
- Koo Chung, Korean-American musician
- Kyung Wha Chung (born 1948), South Korean violinist
- Lee Isaac Chung (born 1978), Korean-American filmmaker
- Myung-wha Chung (born 1944), South Korean cellist
- Myung-whun Chung (born 1953), South Korean conductor and pianist
- Nicole Chung (born 1981), Korean-American writer
- Peter Chung (born 1961), South Korean–American animator
- Roy Chung (1957–2004), Korean–American US Army soldier and defector to North Korea
- Sun Hwan Chung (born 1940), South Korean–American Hapkido, Tang Soo Do and Taekwondo grandmaster
- Wonho Chung (born 1981), Korean-Jordanian TV personality

== Chinese ==
- Arthur Chung (1918–2008), first President of Guyana
- Alexa Chung (born 1983), British writer, television presenter, model and fashion designer
- Betty Chung (born 1947), Hong Kong singer and actress
- Brendon Chung, founder of Blendo Games
- Cecilia Chung (born 1965), Hong Kong LGBT rights activist
- Charlet Chung (born 1983), American actress
- Cherie Chung (born 1960), Hong Kong actress
- Chipo Chung (born 1977), Zimbabwean actress and activist
- Christopher Chung (politician) (born 1957), Hong Kong politician
- Christopher Chung (actor) (born 1988), Australian actor and singer
- Christy Chung (born 1970), Canadian actress
- Chung Thye Phin (1879–1935), Malaysian farmer and businessman
- Chung Yung-chi (born 1957), Taiwanese weightlifter
- Connie Chung (born 1946), American journalist
- David Chung (disambiguation), multiple people
- Deborah Chung (born 1952), Chinese–American materials scientist and academic
- Doreen Chung (c. 1932–2009), Guyanese public figure and wife of President Arthur Chung
- Fan Chung (born 1949), Taiwanese–American mathematician and academic
- Fay Chung (born 1941), Zimbabwean politician and educator
- Foy Gordon Chung (born 1975), Fijian swimmer
- Geoffrey Chung (1950–1995), Jamaican musician and record producer
- Iris Chung (born 1987), Hong Kong model and actress
- Kadin Chung (born 1998), Canadian soccer player
- Lily Chung (born 1969), Hong Kong actress
- Linda Chung (born 1984), Canadian actress, singer and songwriter
- Margaret Chung (actress) (born 1976), Canadian model, actress and yoga instructor
- Mikey Chung (1950–2021), Jamaican musician and record producer
- Patrick Chung (born 1987), American football player
- Paul Chung (1959–1989), Hong Kong actor and disc jockey
- Sammy Chung (1932–2022), English footballer and manager
- Sharon Chung, American politician from Illinois
- Stella Chung (born 1981), Malaysian actress and singer
- Tiffany Chung (born 1969), American artist
- Wallace Chung (born 1974), Hong Kong actor
- Yip-Wah Chung (born 1950), Hong Kong materials and mechanical engineer

== Fictional characters ==
- Chung Su-Lee, the Chinese student in Mind Your Language, played by Pik-Sen Lim

== See also ==
- Zhong (surname)
