= Tongyeong International Music Festival =

Music festival concert venue in Tongyeong, South Korea

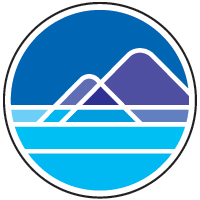
- Official Logo for TIMF-Tongyeong International Music Festival
- Genre: Classical music
- Dates: Spring
- Locations: Tongyeong, South Korea
- Years active: 2002–present
- Website: www.timf.org/en/

- Tongyeong International Music Festival
- Hangul: 통영국제음악제
- Hanja: 統營國際音樂祭
- RR: Tongyeong gukje eumakje
- MR: T'ongyŏng kukche ŭmakche

Tongyeong International Music Festival (TIMF; Korean: 통영국제음악제) is an annual music festival held in Tongyeong, South Gyeongsang Province, South Korea. Considering the classification between ethnic and artistic categories, TIMF may be classified into one of Korea's leading arts and music festivals which is specialized in western music, i.e. with a variety of style and genre, such as contemporary, early(baroque), classical, romantic, traditional, symphonic, chamber or ensemble, operatic or music theater. In spite of its various appetite for genre, TIMF is usually known as being strong in contemporary program of western style music. The artistic director (from 2022 onwards) is the composer Unsuk Chin.

== History ==
The origin of this festival results from the spirit to commemorate Isang Yun (윤이상; 1917–1995), a world-renowned composer who was born in Sancheong near Tongyeong and lived the latter part of life in Berlin, Germany. Yun settled down in Tongyeong and took the first job of teaching at high schools. At 39, Yun moved to Europe to study at Berlin University of the Arts, Germany. As a full-time professor, he educated many young artists whether they are composers or players, and many of his disciples were Koreans or from Korea.

Isang Yun's Korean disciples were the ones that led TIMF project to be feasible. They first sought for sponsorship from the municipal government in order to present an introductory concert titled as 'Night of Isang Yun's Music'. This singular concert was held in 1999 and found itself to be successful thanks to hails of so many Korean artists.

The disciples were encouraged by this success, and they tried to develop it into Tongyeong Contemporary Music Festival. This festival is now recognized as an archetype of TIMF's current format, and on its threshold, it was a reformatory challenge to extend a singular concert to a form of a three-days festival.

This festival is very similar to 'the present' TIMF in the following features.

a. It was organized in a perfect form of a festival, as being held for three consecutive days.

b. Each different concert presented each different content in program, style and instrumentation.

c. Consistency was met in content programming, as the festival set its own theme.

2 years of experiments in the form of festival made it clear that the content of western music could be cooperatively coexistent with Tongyeong's environments. The opinions arose among the populace that the festival should be developed into an international format.

But the initiators did not make haste. Their next step was to establish an independent entity of a foundation. This action was necessary because the activity of hosting a festival should be politically neutral and cannot be disturbed by politicians or governments. The initiators formed the Board of Directors being helped by the provincial and the municipal governments, and the Board determined the initiative proposals to constitute a foundation and elect Seong-Yawng Park (1932–2005) as the first Chairman of TIMF Foundation. The Foundation was established and registered in February 2002.

TIMF 2002, the first edition of a new 'international' format, was presented by this new legal entity through organizational forces caused by the Board, the Managing Committee and the Administration Office. Based upon the past 2 years' experiences, the programmers of the Secretariat constituted Tongyeong International Music Festival 2002, for 8 consecutive days in March.

The programmers kept deciding a new theme for each year. The theme was always derived from a subtitle of Isang Yun's works. Although there always arose a need to construct a new concert hall, Tongyeong Arts Center with Main Hall (880 seats) and Small Hall (290 seats), was always the official venue. The following is the prospectus of Tongyeong International Music Festival since its first edition up to now.

=== Editions ===
| Year | Theme | Dates |
|---|---|---|
| TIMF 2002 | Fanfare & Memorial | March 8 to March 15 |
| TIMF 2003 | Dream | March 25 to April 2 |
| TIMF 2004 | Espace | March 22 to March 27, June 20, August 30, December 12 |
| TIMF 2005 | Memory | March 17 to March 22, July 3 to July 8, October 28 to November 6 |
| TIMF 2006 | Flux | March 21 to March 26, October 27 to November 6 |
| TIMF 2007 | Rencontre | March 23 to March 29, July 2 to July 7, October 26 to November 4 |
| TIMF 2008 | Freiheit | March 21 to March 26, November 1 to November 9 |
| TIMF 2009 | East & West | March 27 to April 2, June 29 to July 4, November 14 to November 22 |
| TIMF 2010 | Music + | March 19 to March 25 |
| TIMF 2011 | Moving Dimension | March 26 to April 1 |
| TIMF 2012 | Without Distance | March 23 to March 29 |
| TIMF 2013 | Free & Lonely | March 22 to March 28 |

== Programs ==
The uniqueness in contemporary programming results from its spiritual motto that encourages programmers to commemorate and inherit creative minds of Isang Yun, a Korean composer born in Tongyeong. Isang Yun was helped and discovered by European sponsors in the past during the time where he endeavored to research abroad, TIMF finds it as an organizational mission to discover many other young composers who may succeed to Yun's legacy. Following Isang Yun's death, TIMF's programmers try to make usual commissions to new works by young composers with creativity.

Since Asia is still regarded upon as the periphery of music society, TIMF's discoveries are mainly focused on Asian composers. The following is the selected list of Asian composers whom TIMF has proudly found over the last decade by setting their own repertoire on stage.

Toru Takemitsu (Japan; 1930~1996)
Sukhi Kang (Korea; 1934~)
Chung-Gil Kim (Korea; 1934~)
Byung-dong Paik (Korea; 1936~)
Younghi Pagh-Paan (Korea; 1945~)
Qigang Chen (China; 1951~)
Qu Xiao-Song (China' 1952~)
Ih Kangyul (Korea; 1953~2004)
Toshio Hosokawa (Japan; 1955~)
Tan Dun (China; 1957~)
June Hee Lim (Korea; 1959~)
Unsuk Chin (Korea; 1961~)
Uzong Choe (Korea; 1968~)
Nam-kuk Kim (Korea; 1971~)
Sungji Hong (Korea; 1973~)

Let alone Asian composers, TIMF has also presented many outstanding contemporary works written by 20th century's composers. If the concept 'contemporary' may be defined as a reformative attempt towards new forms, a variety of works and composers can be introduced. TIMF has set up its own programming policy to honor contemporary era by finding the beauty of the works and introducing it to new and young audiences. The following is the result of the efforts made to do the finding.

Leoš Janáček (Czech; 1854~1928)
Edward Elgar (England; 1857~1934)
Isaac Albéniz (Spain; 1860~1909)
Gustav Mahler (Austria; 1860~1911)
Claude Debussy (France; 1862~1918)
Richard Strauss (Germany; 1864~1949)
Alexander Scriabin (Russia; 1872~1915)
Ralph Vaughan Williams (England; 1872~1958)
Sergei Rachmaninoff (Russia; 1873~1943)
Arnold Schoenberg (Austria; 1874~1951)
Charles Ives (America; 1874~1954)
Maurice Ravel (France; 1875~1937)
Manuel de Falla (Spain; 1876~1946)
Béla Bartók (Hungary; 1881~1945)
Karol Szymanowski (Poland; 1882~1937)
Zoltán Kodály (Hungary; 1882~1967)
Anton Webern (Austria; 1883~1945)
Edgard Varèse (France; 1883~1965)
Alban Berg (Austria; 1885~1935)
Heitor Villa-Lobos (Brazil; 1887~1959)
Bohuslav Martinu (Czech; 1890~1959)
Sergei Prokofiev (Russia; 1891~1953)
Darius Milhaud (France; 1892~1974)
Paul Hindemith (Germany; 1895~1963)
Francis Poulenc (France; 1899~1963)
Luigi Dallapiccola (Italy; 1904~1975)
Andre Jolivet (France; 1905~1974)
Giacinto Scelsi (Italy; 1905~1988)
Dmitri Shostakovich (Russia; 1906~1975)
Olivier Messiaen (France; 1908~1992)
Elliott Carter (America; 1908~2012)
Samuel Barber (America; 1910~1981)
John Cage (America; 1912~1992)
Benjamin Britten (England; 1913~1976)
Witold Lutosławski (Poland; 1913~1994)
Alberto Ginastera (Argentina; 1916~1983)
Henri Dutilleux (France; 1916~2013)
Ástor Piazzolla (Argentina; 1921~1992)
Iannis Xenakis (Greece; 1922~2001)
György Ligeti (Hungary; 1923~2006)
Luigi Nono (Italy; 1924~1990)
Luciano Berio (Italy; 1925~2003)
Pierre Boulez (France; 1925~2017)
György Kurtág (Hungary; 1926~)
Karlheinz Stockhausen (Germany; 1928~2007)
Mauricio Kagel (Germany; 1931~2008)
Sofia Gubaidulina (Russia; 1931~2025)
Krzysztof Penderecki (Poland; 1933~2020)
Alfred Schnittke (Russia; 1934~1998)
Arvo Pärt (Estonia; 1935~)
Steve Reich (America; 1936~)
Heinz Holliger (Switzerland; 1939~)
Franghiz Ali-Zadeh (Azerbaijan; 1947~)
Salvatore Sciarrino (Italy; 1947~)
Wolfgang Rihm (Germany; 1952~2024)

== Artists ==
As well as composers, TIMF has also presented outstanding musicians and performers. Its programming policy is concentratively set on presenting 2 categories of classical musicians; famed top stars or gifted top rookies. For this reason, TIMF's concert model is structured in a symmetrical compatibility between experimental performances to introduce young players and big-scale projects run by globally recognized orchestras, chamber ensembles, soloists or operatic productions. The following shows the artists staged in TIMF's history complying with these 2 categories.

=== Young players introduced ===
Bartosz Koziak, Cello (2009)
Yunji Kang, Viola (2009)
Asian Festival Ensemble (2009)
KNUA String Ensemble with Solenne Paidassi, Violin (2008)
Narek Hakhnazaryan, Cello (2008)
Parker String Quartet (2008)
Sangah Nah, Flute (2008)
Ye-Eun Choi, Violin (2007)
Jun Mo Yang, Baritone (2007)
Julie Albers, Cello (2007)
Erin Keefe, Violin and So-Mang Jeagal, Piano (2007)
Young-Ah Tak, Piano (2006)
Jane Yoon, Harp (2006)
David DQ Lee, Countertenor (2006)
Bo-Kyoung Lee, Violin (2006)
Norie Takahashi, Piano (2006)
Sun-Wook Kim, Piano (2005)
Lin Yue, Violin (2005)
Kayagum Ensemble SAGYE (2005)
Boris Andrianov, Cello and Dimitri Illarionov, Guitar (2005)
Na-Young Baek, Cello (2004)
Matt Haimovitz, Cello (2004)

=== Globally recognized performing artists ===
Northern Sinfonia with Thomas Zehetmair, Conducting & Violin (2009)
Roby Lakatos, Gypsy Violin (2009)
Munich Chamber Orchestra with Alexander Liebreich, Conducting (2009, 2007)
Yeol-Eum Son, Piano (2008, 2005, 2002)
London Chamber Orchestra with Han-na Chang, Cello (2008)
Europa Galante with Fabio Biondi, Violin (2008)
Freiburg Baroque Orchestra (2008)
John Holloway, Violin (2008)
HaeSun Paik, Piano (2008, 2004)
Jacques Loussier, Jazz Piano (2008)
BBC Philharmonic Orchestra with Gianandrea Noseda, Conducting (2008)
Hilary Hahn, Violin (2008)
English Chamber Orchestra with Ralf Gothóni, Conducting (2007)
Jordi Savall, Viola da gamba (2007, 2005)
Kazuhito Yamashita, Guitar (2007)
Claude Bolling, Jazz Piano (2007)
Dong-Min Lim, Piano (2007)
Kronos Quartet with Wu Man, Pipa (2007)
St.Petersburg Philharmonic Orchestra with Yuri Temirkanov, Conducting (2006)
Vladimir Feltsman, Piano (2006)
Richard Yongjae O'Neill, Viola (2006)
Moscow Philharmonic Orchestra with Yuri Simonov, Conducting (2006)
Stuttgart Chamber Orchestra with Peter von Wienhardt, Piano (2005)
Arditti Quartet (2005)
Dong-Suk Kang, Violin (2005)
Sir John Eliot Gardiner, Conducting with Monteverdi Choir and English Baroque Soloists (2004)
Chung Trio (2004)
Mischa Maisky, Cello (2004)
Tan Dun, Conducting (2004)
Silesian String Quartet (2004)
The State Symphony Capella of Russia with Valeri Polyansky, Conducting (2004)
Rachel Lee, Violin (2004)
Natalie Clein, Cello (2004)
Vienna Philharmonic Orchestra with Zubin Mehta, Conducting (2003)
Sarah Chang, Violin (2003)
Sejong Soloists with Cho-Liang Lin, Violin (2003)
Heinz Holliger, Conducting & Oboe (2003)
Myung-whun Chung, Conducting with Philharmonique Orchestra de Radio France (2002)
Dong-Hyek Lim, Piano (2002)
Xenakis Ensemble (2002)

== Vision: artistic director ==
On the verge of opening TIMF 2009, the Festival embraced a revolutionary brand-new phase of its history. TIMF Foundation, the managing body of the Festival and other related business branches, announced that TIMF would appoint a new artistic director, the position that had been left unfilled since the birth of the Festival. The inaugural artistic director was Alexander Liebreich, principal conductor of the Munich Chamber Orchestra, followed by the German cultural manager Florian Riem, and (from 2022 onwards), the composer Unsuk Chin.

See also

- List of music festivals in South Korea
- List of classical music festivals
