= Zhong (surname) =

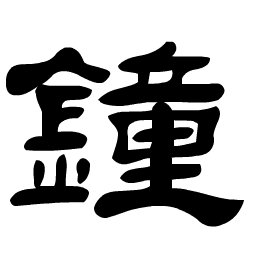
- Traditional Chinese: 鍾 / 鐘
- Simplified Chinese: 锺 / 钟
- Hanyu Pinyin: Zhōng
- Jyutping: Zung^{1}
- Literal meaning: vessel
Transcriptions
Standard Mandarin
- Hanyu Pinyin: Zhōng
- Gwoyeu Romatzyh: Jong
- Tongyong Pinyin: Jhōng
Yue: Cantonese
- Jyutping: Zung^{1}
Southern Min
- Hokkien POJ: Cheng, Chiong, Tiong

Zhong
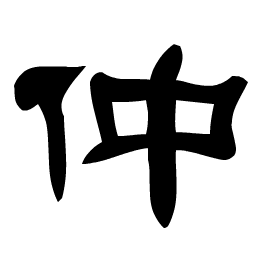
- Chinese: 仲
- Hanyu Pinyin: Zhòng
- Jyutping: Zung^{6}
- Literal meaning: second, middle
Transcriptions
Standard Mandarin
- Hanyu Pinyin: Zhòng
- Gwoyeu Romatzyh: Jonq
- Tongyong Pinyin: Jhòng
Yue: Cantonese
- Jyutping: Zung^{6}
Southern Min
- Hokkien POJ: Tiōng, Chiong

Zhong is pinyin transliteration of several Chinese surnames, including Zhōng (鍾/鐘/钟), and Zhòng (仲). These are also transliterated as Chung (especially in Taiwan, Hong Kong and Malaysia), Cheong or Choong (in Malaysia), Tjung or Tjoeng (in Indonesia), and Chiong (in the Philippines). It is the 53rd most common surname in mainland China.

== Notable people surnamed Zhong ==
=== Zhōng 鍾/鐘/钟 ===
- Alexa Chung (born 1983), English model and television personality
- Arthur Chung (1918–2008), first president of Guyana
- Basuki Tjahaja Purnama (鐘萬學) (born 1966), Indonesian businessman, politician, former governor of Jakarta
- Betty Chung (born 1947), Hong Kong actress and singer
- Cheong Eak Chong (1888–1984), Singaporean entrepreneur
- Gillian Chung (born 1980), Hong Kong singer and actress
- Jamie Chung (born 1983), American actress
- Jong Chien-wu, Taiwanese football manager
- Jong Yeu-Jeng (born 1973), Taiwanese baseball player
- Chung Chun-to, better known as Kenny Bee (born 1953), Hong Kong singer, songwriter, and actor
- Linda Chung (born 1984), Hong Kong singer and actress
- Zhong Guiqing (born 1977), Chinese pole vaulter
- Zhong Hui (born 225–264), military general, politician and writer of the state of Cao Wei in the Three Kingdoms period
- Zhong Kui, Chinese god of vanquishing ghosts
- Zhong Yao (151–230), Chinese calligrapher and politician
- Zhong Chenle (born 2001), Chinese singer based in South Korea, member of NCT Dream
- Zhong Naixiong (born 1963), Chinese entrepreneur and billionaire
- Stella Chung (born 1981), Malaysian singer and actress
- Zhong Wanxie (born 1934), Chinese civil engineer and physicist
- Simon Chung (鍾德勝), Hong Kong film director
- Kym Ng (钟琴), stage name of Ng Kwee Khim (黄桂琴) (born 1967), Singaporean actress
- Choong Pei Shan (钟佩珊), Singaporean housewife and murder victim
- Cheng Geok Ha (钟玉霞) (c. 1967–1977), Singaporean schoolgirl who was raped and murdered
- Cheong Wai Sang (钟伟生), Singaporean convicted rioter and killer
- Chung Hsin-yu (born 1983), Taiwanese host and actress
- Zhong Huijuan (born 1961), Chinese pharmaceutical executive
- Zhong Shanshan (born 1954), Chinese businessman
- Aviis Zhong (born 1986), Taiwanese actress
- Zhong Tao (钟涛; born 2002), Chinese pole vaulter

=== Zhòng 仲 ===
- Zhong You (542–480 BC), disciple of Confucius
- Zhong Man (born 1983), Chinese sabre fencer

=== Zhong ===
- Guangming Zhong, microbiologist
- Zhong Mengying (born 1990), Chinese triathlete
- Deng Zhong, multiple people
- Zhong Jiyu (born 1997), Chinese football player
- Zhong Ni (born 1962), Chinese tennis player
- Zhong Huanghao (born 1998), Chinese Paralympic athlete
- Zhong Hu of Cai

== See also ==
- Zhang (surname)
- Chung (surname)
