= Dong-Min Lim =

South Korean classical pianist (born 1980)

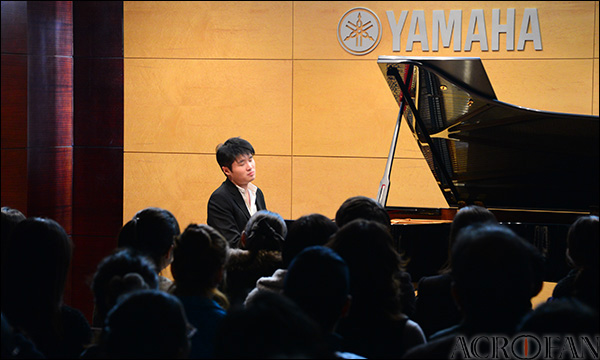
- Born: April 14, 1980 (age 45); Seoul, South Korea
- Occupation: Classical pianist

- Dong-Min Lim
- Hangul: 임동민
- RR: Im Dongmin
- MR: Im Tongmin

Dong-Min Lim (Korean: 임동민; born April 14, 1980, in Seoul) is a South Korean classical pianist. He and his brother Dong-Hyek Lim won third prize at the XV International Chopin Piano Competition in Warsaw. Dong Min Lim studied at the Moscow Conservatory, at the Hochschule für Musik, Theater und Medien Hannover and at Mannes College The New School for Music.

== Childhood ==
Lim started playing the piano at the age of nine. However, within two years, he had won various competitions in South Korea such as Samick Piano Competition. While he was studying in Sun Hwa Arts School with the full scholarship at age 14, he moved to Moscow in 1994 to study at the Tchaikovsky Conservatory in Moscow, with his parents. He continued his studies with Professor Lev Naumov. Since he was young, he participated in most of the top competitions in Europe. At that time, Lim got a message of congratulations by Kim Young-sam, the president of Korea at that moment.

== Awards ==
Lim had received plenty of awards in well-known competitions. In 1996, at age 16, he was the winner of the Chopin Competition for Young Pianists in Moscow (his brother Dong-Hyek Lim was in second place). In 1998, he was in the final round of International Tchaikovsky Competition for young adults. Also, he was placed as the third in International Vioti Competition. Moreover, in 2001, he was placed as the third in The International Piano Competition Ferruccio Busoni, Italy when there was no winner. He also took the fifth prize at the 2002 International Tchaikovsky Competition. Here, he was the third person in Korean history after Myung-whun Chung (정명훈) and Hae-Sun Beak (백혜선) to be on the top list. In 2005, Lim participated in the 15th International Frederick Chopin Piano Competition in Warsaw announcing that this competition would be the last competition. At the end, he tied (having exactly the same decimal numbers) the third prize with his brother Dong-Hyek Lim (while there was no second prize) as the first Koreans in the history to be on the first five list.

== Performing style ==
The performing styles of Dong-Min and Dong-Hyek Lim are very contrasting from each other. While Dong-Min Lim's performing style is soft, light, and flexible, which gives the audience a comfort sound to hear, Dong-Hyek Lim has more characteristic sound (sound of his own), using a lot of good techniques while he is playing a piece.

== See also ==
- List of classical pianists
- TIMF
