= Tatiana Shebanova =

Russian pianist

- Татьяна Шебанова
- Born: 12 January 1953; Moscow, Russia
- Died: 1 March 2011 (aged 58); Warsaw, Poland
- Occupation: Pianist

Tatiana Vladimirovna Shebanova (Russian: Татьяна Владимировна Шебанова; 12 January 1953 – 1 March 2011) was a Russian pianist.

== Early life ==
Shebanova was born in Moscow, Russia. She finished the central music school of the Moscow Conservatoire where she studied with Tatiana Kestner. She graduated the Moscow Conservatoire with a gold medal in 1976 after studying under professor Victor Merzhanov. For the next decade she continued working with Merzhanov as assistant lecturer.

== Career ==
Shebanova participated in the X International Chopin Piano Competition and won the second prize, which launched her career on the world stage. In the final round of the competition, she chose to perform Chopin Piano Concerto No. 2 in F Minor and was awarded with the special prize from the jury for “Best performance of a Piano Concerto” together with Đặng Thái Sơn.

Shebanova performed in almost all European countries as well as in the Philippines, Taiwan, Canada, South Africa and the USA. She also appeared more than 100 times in Japan. She performed regularly with her husband Jarosław Drzewiecki, and their son, Stanisław Drzewiecki. She was the first performer of new compositions by Jevgeny Golubev, Yuri Aleksandrov and Boris Bloch.

Shebanova made about 50 recordings, in LP and CD mostly for former eastern bloc labels such as Melodiya and Polskie Nagrania Muza. She recorded Chopin, Brahms, Rachmaninov, Feinberg, Debussy, Szymanowski and Zarzycki, for labels including RCA Victor, Melodia, Muza, CBS/Sony, EMI, Pony Canyon and Dux.

She lived for many years in Poland, teaching at the Bydgoszcz Academy of Music and giving regular master classes. She died in Warsaw in 2011, aged 58.

=== Competitions ===
- Concertino Praha in Prague in 1969 (1st Prize)
- Geneva in 1976 (1st Prize and two special awards - "American" and Ernest Shelling)
- X International Chopin Piano Competition in Warsaw in 1980 (2nd Prize, Chopin Society Award for best polonaise performance, National Philharmonic Award for best piano concerto performance)
- Bösendorfer Empire Grand Prix Competition in Brussels in 1990 (1st Prize and three special awards)

She also took part in the Tchaikovsky Competition in Moscow in 1974.
