= XV International Chopin Piano Competition =

Piano competition (2005)

The Fifteenth International Fryderyk Chopin Piano Competition
- Official poster
- Date: 2–24 October 2005
- Venue: National Philharmonic, Warsaw
- Hosted by: Fryderyk Chopin Society
- Winner: (Poland) Rafał Blechacz
- Website: konkurs15.chopin.pl

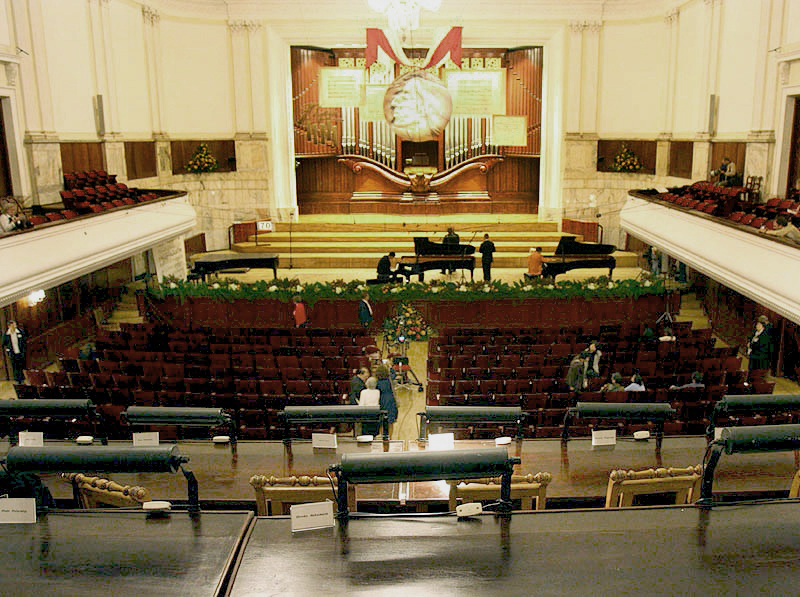
The National Philharmonic during the competition

The XV International Chopin Piano Competition (Polish: XV Międzynarodowy Konkurs Pianistyczny im. Fryderyka Chopina) was held from 2 to 24 October 2005 in Warsaw, organized by the Fryderyk Chopin Society. The competition was won by Rafał Blechacz of Poland, who prevailed against 80 competitors from 18 countries.

This was the first competition that was completely broadcast on TV, radio and on the internet.

== Awards ==
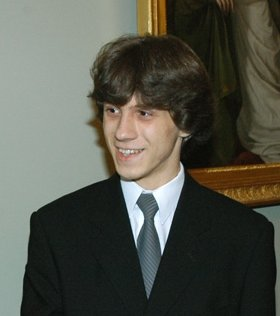
Rafał Blechacz of Poland decisively won the competition

For the first time, the competition introduced a preliminary round, as selecting participants from submitted recordings only was deemed not wholly reliable.

In the most decisive showing in the history of the competition, Rafał Blechacz took First Prize and the special prizes for the best performance of a polonaise, mazurka, and concerto. One of the judges, Piotr Paleczny, said that Blechacz "so outclassed the remaining finalists that no second prize could actually be awarded." Another judge, John O'Conor, called Blechacz "one of the greatest artists I have had a chance to hear in my entire life". Blechacz was the first Pole to win the prize since 1975, when Krystian Zimerman won.

The following prizes were awarded:

Prize		Winner	
1st place, gold medalist(s)	US$25,000	Rafał Blechacz	Poland
2nd place, silver medalist(s)	not awarded		
3rd place, bronze medalist(s)	US$15,000	Dong-Hyek Lim	South Korea
3rd place, bronze medalist(s)	US$15,000	Dong-Min Lim	South Korea
4th	US$10,000	Shohei Sekimoto	Japan
4th	US$10,000	Takashi Yamamoto	Japan
5th	not awarded		
6th	US$6,000	Ka Ling Colleen Lee	Hong Kong
F	US$2,000	Andriej Jaroszynskij	Russia
F	US$2,000	Jacek Kortus	Poland
F	US$2,000	Rachel Naomi Kudo	United States
F	US$2,000	Rieko Nezu	Japan
F	US$2,000	Yuma Osaki	Japan
F	US$2,000	Yeol Eum Son	South Korea

In addition, three special prizes were awarded independently:

Special prize	Winner	
Best Performance of a Concerto	Rafał Blechacz	Poland
Best Performance of Mazurkas	Rafał Blechacz	Poland
Best Performance of a Polonaise	Rafał Blechacz	Poland

== Jury ==
The jury consisted of:

- (Russia) Vera Gornostayeva
- (Poland) Lidia Grychtołówna
- (Poland) Adam Harasiewicz ( (gold) V)
- (Poland) Krzysztof Jabłoński
- (Poland) Andrzej Jasiński (chairman)
- (South Korea) Choong-Mo Kang
- (Russia) Vladimir Krainev
- (Japan) Hiroko Nakamura
- (Republic of Ireland) John O'Conor
- (Poland) Janusz Olejniczak
- (Poland) Piotr Paleczny (vice-chairman)
- (United States) John Perry
- (Italy) Sergio Perticaroli
- (Poland) Ewa Pobłocka (5th X)
- (France) Bernard Ringeissen
- (Poland) Regina Smendzianka
- (Poland) Józef Stompel
- (Vietnam) (Canada) Đặng Thái Sơn ( (gold) X)
- (Israel) Arie Vardi
- (United Kingdom) Fanny Waterman
- (China) Zhou Guangren
