= Deng Zhong (Investiture of the Gods) =

Character and Taoist deity

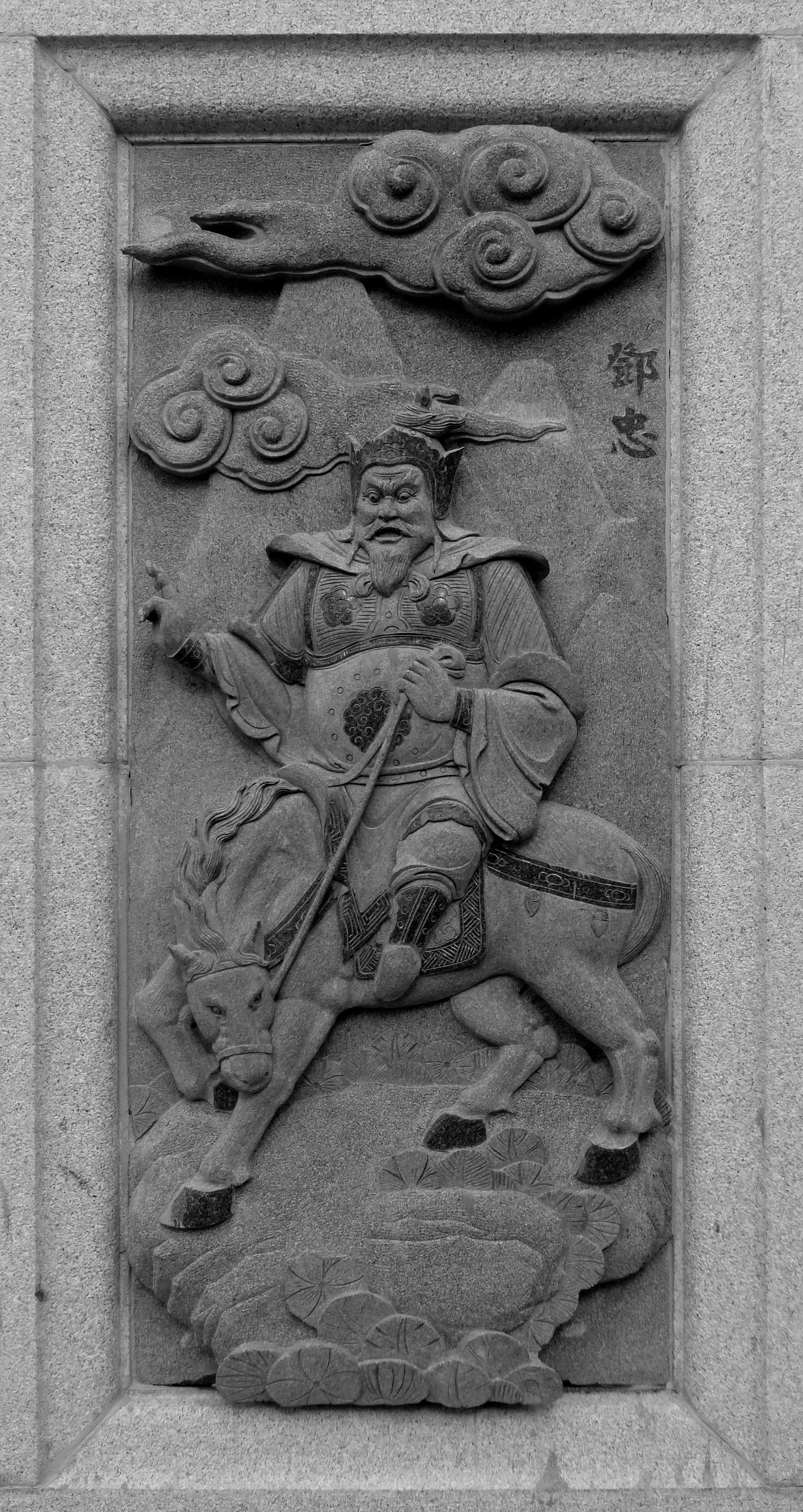
A depiction of Deng Zhong at Ping Sien Si

Deng Zhong (Chinese: 邓忠; pinyin: Dèng Zhōng) is a character in the Chinese novel Investiture of the Gods (Fengshen Yanyi). He is the eldest of four sworn brothers who live at Mount Yellow Flower and later serve as generals under Wen Zhong of the Shang dynasty.

== In Investiture of the Gods ==
Deng Zhong is described as having a blue-black face, red hair, large teeth, and a loud voice. He carries a large axe as his weapon.

Deng Zhong lives at Mount Yellow Flower with his sworn brothers Xin Huan, Zhang Jie, and Tao Rong. When Wen Zhong passes through the area during his campaign against the forces of Jiang Ziya, the four agree to join the Shang army. Deng Zhong subsequently serves under Wen Zhong in the campaign against Xiqi.

During the campaign, Deng Zhong takes part in battles against the Zhou forces. Wen Zhong later assigns him and Zhang Jie to fight on the left side of the Shang camp while Xin Huan and Tao Rong fight on the right.

Deng Zhong is killed by Nezha at Juelong Ridge. During the battle, Nezha strikes Deng Zhong with the Qiankun Circle, knocking him from his horse, and then kills him with his spear. His spirit is subsequently sent to the Investiture Platform.

At the end of the novel, Deng Zhong is appointed one of the twenty-four Heavenly Lords of the Thunder Ministry (雷部). He is named Deng Tianjun (邓天君), with the personal name Zhong. The twenty-four Heavenly Lords are placed under Wen Zhong, who is appointed the Jiutian Yingyuan Leisheng Puhua Tianzun.

== Religious tradition ==
Deng Zhong is identified with Deng Marshal (邓元帅), a god of thunder in Taoism. According to the Chinese Taoist Association, Deng Marshal's name is Zhong (忠). He is also called the Heavenly Origin Deng General (天元邓将军). Investiture of the Gods calls him Deng Zhong, while Journey to the West calls him Deng Hua.

Deng Marshal also appears in older Chinese records. The Yijian zhi bu (《夷坚志补》) calls him the Heavenly Origin Examining-and-Summoning General Deng (天元考召邓将军). The Changshu zhi (《常熟志》) records a Taoist temple with a Thunder God Hall headed by Deng Marshal.
