= Dong-Hyek Lim =

South Korean pianist (born 1984)

- Born: July 25, 1984 (age 40); Seoul, South Korea
- Genres: Classical
- Occupation: Pianist
- Instrument: Piano
- Labels: Warner Music Group
- Website: www.donghyeklim.com

- Dong-Hyek Lim
- Hangul: 임동혁
- RR: Im Donghyeok
- MR: Im Tonghyŏk

Dong-Hyek Lim (Korean: 임동혁; born July 25, 1984) is a South Korean classical pianist. He and his brother Dong-Min Lim both won third prize at the XV International Chopin Piano Competition in 2005. Lim won fifth prize at the 2000 Ferruccio Busoni International Piano Competition.

== Early life and education ==
Lim was born in Seoul, South Korea. After early studies in Korea, he attended Moscow Conservatory with Professor Lev Naumov. He also studied in Germany with Arie Vardi at the Hochschule für Musik, Theater und Medien Hannover and with Emanuel Ax at the Juilliard School.

== Awards ==
Lim has been the recipient of many prominent awards. In September 1996, he took second prize in the Chopin Competition for Young Pianists in Moscow and received much international attention by being the youngest participant in the competition and by placing second while his elder brother Dong-Min Lim tied for first prize. In 2000, Lim placed fifth at the International Busoni Piano Competition in Italy and won second prize at the Hamamatsu International Piano Competition in Japan.

In December 2001, he became the youngest winner of the Premier Grand Prix in the history of the Marguerite Long-Jacques Thibaud International Piano Competition in Paris and also five other special awards.

Lim created controversy in 2003 upon his refusal of his third prize placement in the Queen Elisabeth Music Competition in Brussels, stating that the judging wasn't fair. The third place prize was consequently 'unawarded' for the first time since the establishment of the competition in 1938, and Lim's name and placement is missing from the laureates' page on the official web site.

Lim participated in the 15th International Chopin Piano Competition in Warsaw in October 2005 and shared the third prize with his elder brother Dong-Min Lim, with no second prize being awarded. He then placed fourth with fellow contestant Sergei Sobolev in the 13th International Tchaikovsky Competition in Moscow in June 2007, where no first prize was awarded.

== Performing and recording career ==
Lim has performed in many venues including the Seoul Arts Center, Small and Great Halls of the Moscow State Conservatory, Salle Pleyel and Salle Cortot in Paris, the Lazienki Palace in Warsaw, the Konzerthaus in Berlin, Wigmore Hall in London, and the Philharmonic Hall in Beppu, Japan. He has also participated in renowned festivals such as Verbier in Switzerland, Klavier-Festival Ruhr in Germany, the 57th International Chopin Festival in Poland, Festival de Radio France et Montpellier, Piano aux Jacobins festival in France and Martha Argerich's Festival in Lugano.

He also appeared with reputable orchestras: the NHK Symphony Orchestra under Charles Dutoit, the St. Petersburg Philharmonic under Yuri Temirkanov, the Orchestre National de France under Kurt Masur, the Orchestre Philharmonique de Radio France under Lawrence Foster and Myung-Whun Chung, the National Orchestra of Belgium under Alexander Dmitriev, the BBC Symphony Orchestra under Jiri Belohlavek, the European Union Youth Orchestra under Vladimir Ashkenazy, the Northern Sinfonia under Thomas Zehetmair, the Moscow Symphony Orchestra, the New Japan Philharmonic and the Israel Philharmonic Orchestra.

== Personal life ==
In November 2009, Lim's mother suddenly died while he was on tour in Malaysia. He played Ravel's Pavane for a Dead Princess in her honor at his recital at the Seoul Arts Center in February, 2010.
