= Colleen Lee =

Hong Kong pianist (born 1980)

- Born: 11 October 1980 (age 45)
- Education: Heep Yunn School
- Occupation: Musician
- Awards: International Frédéric Chopin Piano Competition; 2005 6th in place Hong Kong International Piano Competition; 2005 Finalist
- Musical career
- Genres: Classical
- Instrument: Piano
- Website: https://www.colleen-lee.com/

Colleen Lee Ka-ling (李嘉齡; born 11 October 1980) is a Hong Kong pianist who won the 6th place prize in the XV International Chopin Piano Competition in 2005.

== Biography ==
Lee began piano lessons when she was four, and started studying with Miss Eleanor Wong upon admission to the Hong Kong Academy for Performing Arts two years later. She graduated valedictorian in 2001 (Bachelor’s) and again in 2003 (Professional Diploma), and has since been working with Arie Vardi at the Hochschule in Hannover, Germany.

She has given recitals extensively on nearly every continent, in venues from Carnegie Hall in New York City to Chopin's Manor in Poland, and has collaborated with many major orchestras, performing works from Bach to world premieres of Tjeknavorian and others. She was a guest artist at festivals in Austria (Carinthia), France (Prades “Casals”), Germany (Meissen, Goslar), Italy (Assisi), Holland (Holland Music Sessions) and Poland (Antonin, Chopin Duszniki Zdroj), and has been heard on radio in Hong Kong, Poland, Germany, Italy, Scotland and the United States.

She is considered as a leading pianist in Hong Kong and has performed in the New Masters on Tour Series in Concertgebouw, Amsterdam, and The Hague; as well as in New York City, San Francisco and Tel-Aviv (with the Israel Philharmonic) among other prestigious venues, for the upcoming season.

In 2005, she received 6th prize in the XV International Chopin Piano Competition, and in 2006 she received 6th prize in the Gina Bachauer International Piano Competition. She has also been awarded the Commendation from the Home Affairs Bureau in 2004 and the Commendation for Community Service by the Chief Executive in 2006, in recognition of her outstanding achievements in music.

== Others ==
She has recorded regularly for RTHK Radio 4 for both recitals and chamber series. Also, she was one of the artists presented in the acclaimed Outstanding Young Chinese Musicians Series (2006), and was also one of the ten outstanding Hong Kong musicians featured in the CD and programme "Gifted" presented by RTHK 4 to celebrate the 10th years of the Establishment of the Hong Kong SAR. Her début CD, an all Chopin album, recorded in Warsaw with the Pleyel Piano was issued by the Fryderyk Chopin Institute in 2006. In February 2008, she has recorded her second CD, including various Scarlatti Sonatas.

Lee was also the laureate of the Paloma O'Shea International Piano Competition in Santander, Cantabria, Spain.
