= Bernard d'Ascoli =

French pianist

Bernard d'Ascoli (born 18 November 1958) is a French pianist.

== Biography ==
Born in Provence, France, and blind since the age of 3, d'Ascoli began learning piano and organ at the age of eleven, using scores written in Braille. In 1974 he was the youngest French Baccalaureat graduate of the year and four years later at the age of nineteen, he won the First Prize in the Barcelona International Piano Competition. In 1980 he received honorable mention at the X International Chopin Piano Competition. After winning prizes in Santander, Leipzig and Warsaw, d'Ascoli came to major public attention in 1981 when, following his Third Prize in the Leeds International Piano Competition, he made his London debut in recital and with orchestra and made his first recording of the Liszt sonata and other works for EMI. He made his first appearance with a major American orchestra in 1992, with the Boston Symphony Orchestra.

He went on to perform in London (Royal Festival Hall and the Barbican), Amsterdam (Concertgebouw), Vienna (Musikverein), Melbourne, Paris, Tokyo, Madrid, Washington, Geneva, and the Sydney Opera House. He has performed with most British orchestras, including the main London ones, as well as with many major overseas ensembles such as the Chamber Orchestra of Europe, Montreal Symphony, Boston Symphony, and Dresden Philharmonic. The conductors he has appeared with include Svetlanov, Sanderling, Berglund, Plasson, Casadesus, Guschlbauer, Litton, Menuhin, Pritchard, Llewellyn, Herbig, Leppard, Fischer, Järvi, Parrot and Andrew Davis.

He has taken part in international festivals such as the BBC Proms, Sintra, Oviedo, Besançon or La Roque d'Anthéron. In 2000 he was a special guest of the Sydney Olympic festivities, appearing at the Opera House both as recitalist and soloist with the Sydney Symphony.

He is founder and artistic director of PIANO CANTABILE, an organisation based in Provence which is dedicated to the coaching and professional support of highly talented young pianists.

D'Ascoli has recorded albums of Chopin and Schumann for Nimbus and has made regular recordings as well as live broadcasts for the BBC. He features prominently on a Schumann CD issued by Linn Records of the Quintet and other works, where he is joined by the Schidlof Quartet. His special affinity with Chopin's music led him to undertake the complete recording of the Scherzi, Impromptus and Nocturnes for the Athene-Minerva label. This double album was selected as "Editor's Choice" in Gramophone magazine.
