= Deng Zhong =

Deng Zhong may refer to:

- Deng Zhong (Cao Wei) (died 264), Cao Wei general
- Deng Zhong (Investiture of the Gods), Investiture of the Gods character
