= Rafał Blechacz =

Polish classical pianist

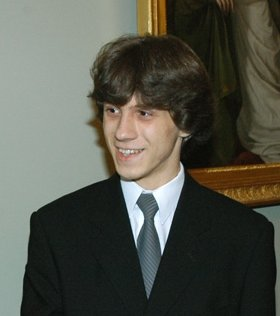
- Born: 30 June 1985 (age 40); Nakło nad Notecią, Poland
- Education: Feliks Nowowiejski Music Academy; Nicolaus Copernicus University in Toruń (PhD)
- Occupation: Pianist
- Awards: (gold) XV International Chopin Piano Competition; (gold) Hamamatsu International Piano Competition
- Website: blechacz.net

Rafał Blechacz ([ˈrafaw ˈblɛxat͡ʂ]; born 30 June 1985) is a Polish classical pianist who rose to fame after winning the XV International Chopin Piano Competition in 2005.

== Biography ==
Blechacz began piano lessons at the age of five, and enrolled in the National Arthur Rubinstein Music School in Bydgoszcz three years later. In May 2007, he graduated from the Feliks Nowowiejski Music Academy in Bydgoszcz with professor Katarzyna Popowa-Zydroń. He won second prize at the Arthur Rubinstein in Memoriam Piano Competition in Bydgoszcz in 2002, first prize at the 4th Hamamatsu International Piano Competition in 2003 (no first prize was awarded), and first prize at the International Piano Competition in Morocco in 2004.

On October 21, 2005, he became the sole recipient of all five first prizes at the 15th International Frederick Chopin Piano Competition in Warsaw, taking First Prize and the polonaise, mazurka, concerto prizes, as well as the Special Prize for Audience Approval. No other pianist has achieved this feat. One of the judges, Piotr Paleczny, said that Blechacz "so outclassed the remaining finalists that no second prize could actually be awarded." Another judge, John O'Conor, called Blechacz "one of the greatest artists I have had a chance to hear in my entire life". Blechacz was the first Pole to win the prize (given every five years) since 1975, when Krystian Zimerman won.

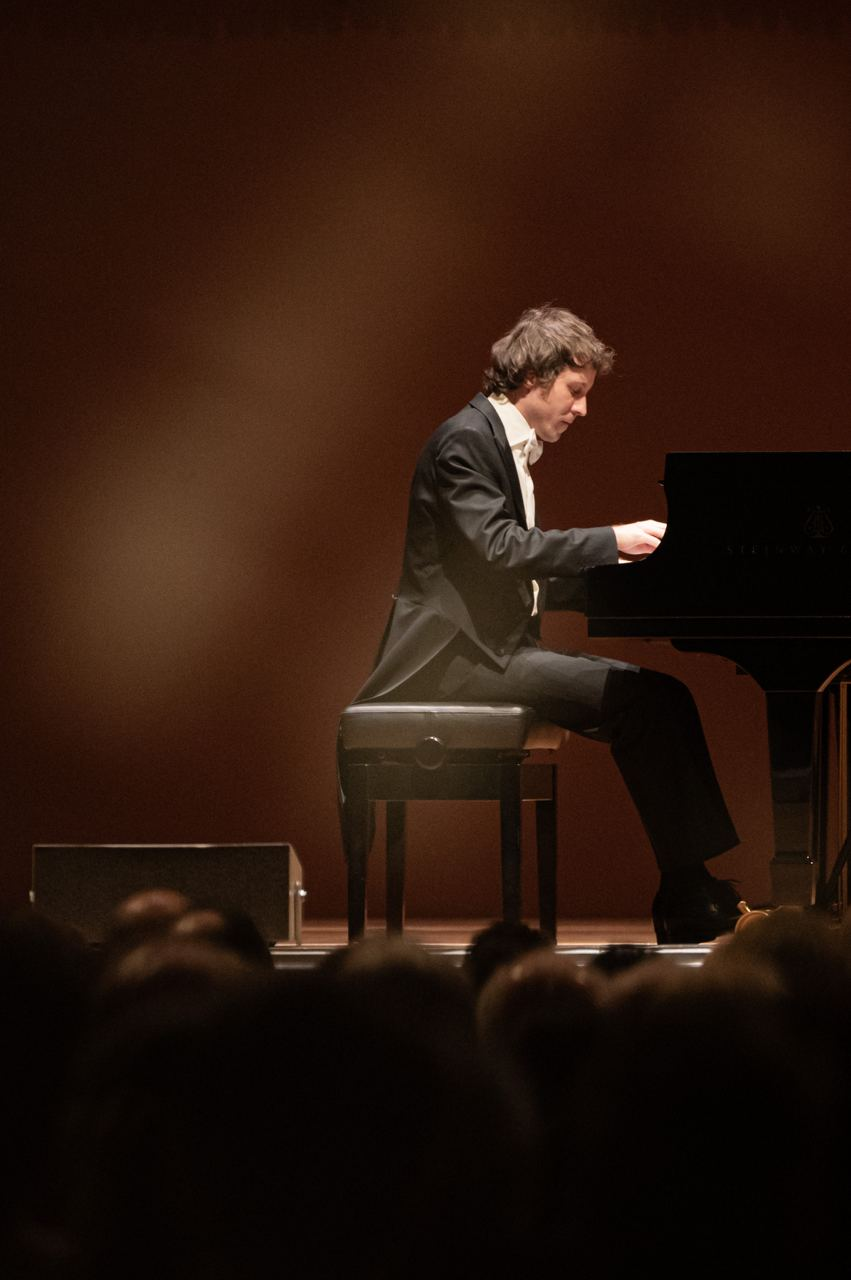
Rafał Blechacz at a concert in Basel, Switzerland

Blechacz signed a contract to record for Deutsche Grammophon on May 29, 2006. In addition to his 2005 debut album from CD Accord, he has released seven albums under Deutsche Grammophon as of March 2022. He recorded with the Warsaw Philharmonic, led by Antoni Wit, for the Chopin Competition in 2005, and with the Concertgebouw, under Jerzy Semkow, for his album of the Chopin piano concertos in 2009. He has also performed with the Russian National Orchestra, the Tonhalle Orchestra, the Berlin Radio Symphony Orchestra, the Philharmonia, the Tokyo Symphony Orchestra, and the Wiener Symphoniker.

In 2014, Blechacz was named the 2014 Gilmore Artist. He is the seventh individual to receive this award, and the second Polish pianist.

Blechacz had been studying philosophy at the Nicolaus Copernicus University in Toruń, and in 2016, took a sabbatical to complete his doctorate. His thesis explored "aspects of the metaphysics and aesthetics of music and, as he reflects, his studies have helped him 'understand both the freedoms and limitations of musical interpretations'". He returned to performing in January 2017.

In March 2022, many of his concerts were cancelled or postponed due to illness.

== Discography ==
Title	Release date	Peak chart positions			Certifications
Title	Release date	POL	FRA	JPN	Certifications
Piano Recital — Schumann, Liszt, Debussy, Szymanowski, Chopin	15 September 2005	28	—	—	POL: Gold
Chopin — Preludes op. 28 & Nocturnes op. 62	1 October 2007	2	194	245	POL: 4× Platinum
Sonatas — Haydn, Mozart, Beethoven	10 October 2008	12	—	—	
Chopin — Piano Concertos	5 October 2009	2	116	—	POL: 3× Platinum
Debussy, Szymanowski	1 February 2012	13	—	—	POL: Gold
Chopin — Polonaises	6 September 2013	8	—	—	POL: Gold
Johann Sebastian Bach	10 February 2017	36	—	—	
Debussy, Fauré, Szymanowski	25 January 2019	—	—	—	
Chopin	3 March 2023	—	—	—	
"—" denotes a recording that did not chart or was not released in that territory.
