= Q. Jane Wang =

Chinese-American tribologist

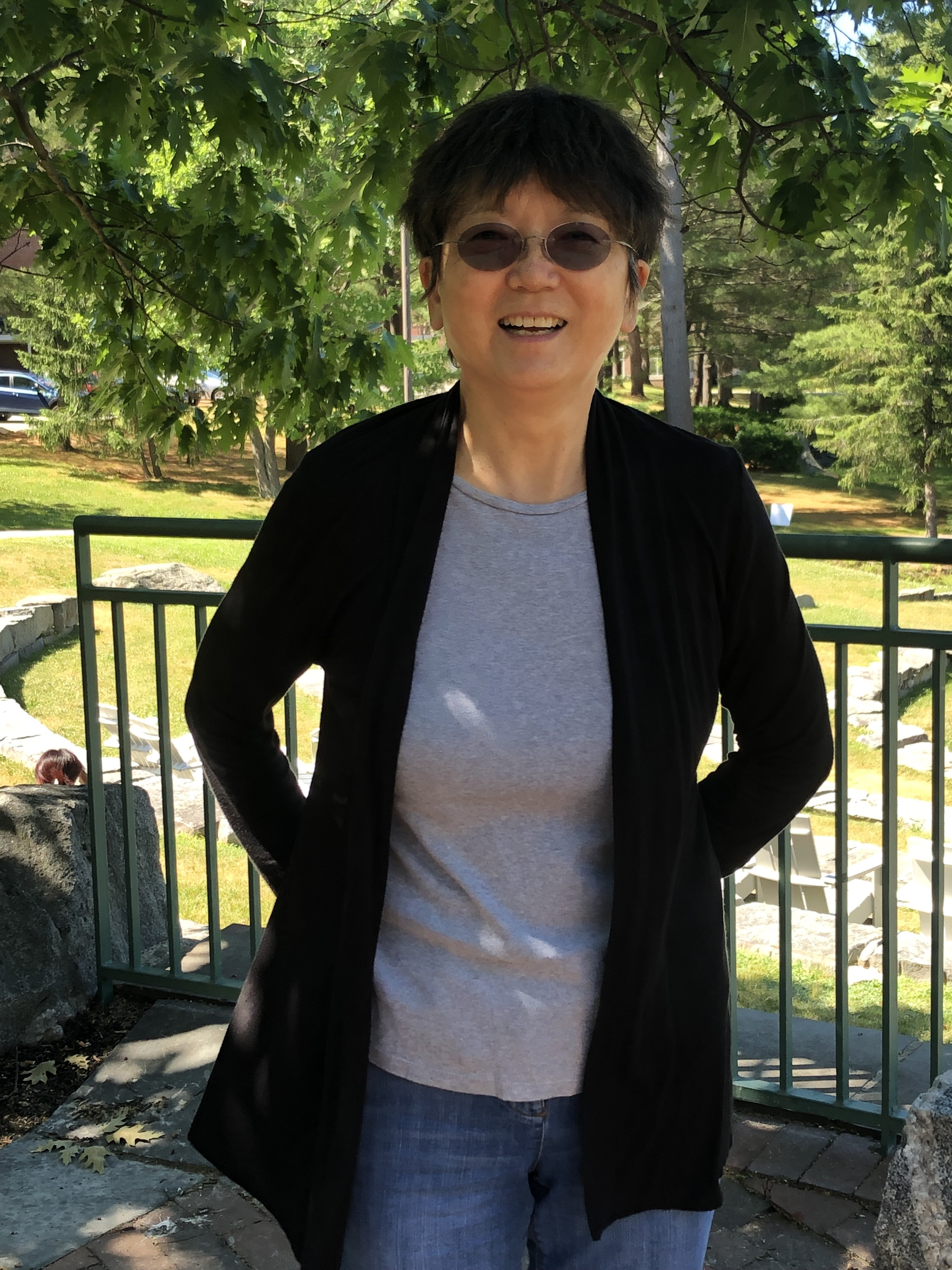
- Q. Jane Wang at the 2022 Tribology GRC (Lewiston, Maine)
- Citizenship: US
- Education: Xi'an University of Technology; Northern Illinois University; Northwestern University
- Known for: Pioneering theories and methods in computational contact mechanics and tribology.
- Awards: 2009 ASME Fellow; 2015 STLE International Award
- Scientific career
- Fields: mechanical engineering, materials science
- Workplaces: Florida International University; Northwestern University
- Doctoral advisor: Herbert S. Cheng

Qian Jane Wang is an American professor of mechanical engineering and the Executive Director for the Center for Surface Engineering and Tribology at Northwestern University. She is a tribologist whose research includes work on contact mechanics, lubrication, micromechanics, and solid-state batteries.

== Education ==
Wang studied mechanical engineering at the Xi'an University of Technology, graduating in 1982. She went to Northern Illinois University for graduate study in mechanical engineering, and earned a master's degree there in 1989. She completed her Ph.D. in 1993 at Northwestern University. Her doctoral advisor was Herbert S. Cheng.

== Research ==
Wang's group has developed theories, models, and methods for understanding and simulation of tribological interfaces and for industrial research and development. The scope of the work includes novel design of tribological surfaces, establishment of unified computational methodologies with a focus on efficient computing, establishment of accurate modeling of transient and steady state tribological responses in polymers, and pioneering methods for the tribological response of materials under strain.

== Recognition ==
Wang was named a Fellow of the Society of Tribologists and Lubrication Engineers (STLE) in 2007, and an ASME Fellow in 2009. She won the Ralph R. Teetor Educational Award in 2000 and in 2015 the STLE awarded her the STLE International Award, which is considered their highest technical award. She has also won numerous best-paper awards, and her research publications have been cited more than 12,000 times as of September 2022.

== Professional service ==
Wang's service with STLE includes Chief Editor for the Encyclopedia of Tribology, Chair, 2011-2012, STLE Fellows Committee, Chair, 2011 ASME/STLE International Joint Tribology Conference, and Chair, 2008 STLE Annual Meeting Program Committee.

Wang worked with fellow engineer at Northwestern Yip-Wah Chung to edit the Encyclopedia of Tribology.
