= Takashi Yamamoto (pianist) =

Japanese pianist

Takashi Yamamoto is a Japanese pianist who won the Silver Medal at the 2006 Gina Bachauer International Piano Competition, a prestigious piano competition held in Salt Lake City, Utah. He shared 4th place in 2005 at the XV International Chopin Piano Competition.
