= Erik Berchot =

French pianist

Erik Berchot (born 14 February 1958) is a French classical pianist.

== Biography ==
Born in Paris, Berchot entered at a very young age at the Conservatoire de Paris where he won 1st prize in piano and chamber music in Yvonne Loriod's class. He later became a soloist for Radio France.

Berchot has won numerous international competitions: Long-Thibaud-Crespin Competition (France), Viotti (Italy), Maria Canals International Music Competition (Spain), Young Concert Artists (New York) and 6th prize at the X International Chopin Piano Competition (Poland).

Berchot is the pianist-actor of Claude Lelouch's feature film Partir, revenir (1985) in which he interprets Sergei Rachmaninoff's 2nd concerto as well as a concert movement by Michel Legrand specially composed for this film.

Michel Legrand, who regularly shares the stage with Berchot, transcribed The Umbrellas of Cherbourg, Yentl and The Windmills of Your Mind for him (version for two pianos).

His recordings include discs devoted to Chopin, Rachmaninoff, Saint-Saëns and Debussy.

Since 2007, he has been Charles Aznavour's solo pianist at the Palais des congrès in Paris and during tours in France, Egypt, Portugal, South and North America, and Moscow. From 2013, he began a tour with Aznavour in Montreal, London, Tel Aviv, Amsterdam, Yerevan, Berlin, Frankfurt, Warsaw (where he received the Frédéric Chopin Prize), Barcelona, Rome, Los Angeles, New York, Moscow, Antwerp, Geneva, St Petersburg, Recife, Porto Alegre, Rio de Janeiro and other cities.

Berchot is regularly invited by the Société Chopin in Paris for the Bagatelle festival.

Berchot is the pianist of Claudy Malherbe's radio opera: La Cantatrice, commissioned by Radio France (September 2008).

On 28 September 2009 in Paris, Berchot received the insignia of Chevalier of the Ordre national du Mérite from the hands of composer Michel Legrand, on behalf of the President of the French Republic, Nicolas Sarkozy.

== Discography ==
- Érik Berchot joue Chopin – Piano Sonata No. 2, Op. 35 "Funeral March" (1839); Polonaise in A-flat major, Op. 53 "Heroic" (1842); Mazurka, Op. 24, No. 1 (1836). Recording: EMI Studio, London – Rodolphe Productions, Harmonia Mundi France, 1989
