= Alexander Lonquich =

German classical pianist and conductor

Alexander Lonquich (born 28 August 1960 in Trier) is a German classical pianist and conductor.

== Biography ==
Lonquich studied with Paul Badura-Skoda, Andrzej Jasiński, and Ilonka Deckers-Küszler.

He won the first prize at the Alessandro Casagrande Piano Competition in Terni, Italy, at the age of 16. In 1980, he received an honorable mention at the X International Chopin Piano Competition.

The musician regularly appeared at international festivals including: Mozartwoche Salzburg, Piano-Festival Ruhr, Schleswig-Holstein Festival, Lucerne Festival, Cheltenham Festival, Edinburgh Festival, Kissinger Sommer, Schubertiade Schwarzenberg, Lockenhaus, Beethovenfest.

Throughout his career, Lonquich worked with several conductors including: Claudio Abbado, Yuri Bashmet, Hans Graf, Heinz Holliger, Ton Koopman, Emmanuel Krivine, Mark Minkowski, Kurt Sanderling, Sándor Végh.

Among the orchestras Lonquich played with are Camerata Salzburg, Mahler Chamber Orchestra, Orchestra Filarmonica Marchigiana, Orchestra da Camera di Mantova, Orchestra del Teatro Olimpico di Vicenza, Münchener Kammerorchester, Kammerorchester Basel, Deutsche Kammerphilharmonie Bremen, Stuttgart Chamber, Symphony Orchestra Frankfurt, Vienna Philharmonic, Royal Philharmonic Orchestra, Tonhalle Orchestra Zurich, Orchestre Philharmonique du Luxembourg, Düsseldorf Symphonic Orchestra. He also conducts himself, sometimes as piano concerto soloist.

Lonquich's performed with numerous chamber music partners, including Renaud Capuçon, Gautier Capuçon, Veronika Hagen, Heinz Holliger, Steven Isserlis, Leonidas Kavakos, Isabelle van Keulen, Sabine Meyer, Heinrich Schiff, Christian Tetzlaff, Auryn Quartet, Ruth Ziesak.

He recorded music by Schubert, Schumann, Poulenc and Mozart for EMI; Fauré, Messiaen, Ravel, Gideon Lewensohn, Flavio Emilio Scogna for RCA Red Seal, Schumann and Holliger for ECM New Series; and Beethoven live for the Ruhr piano festival.

Among Lonquich's recording awards are the Diapason d’Or and Premio Abbiati.

Together with his son, Tommaso Lonquich, clarinet player, he recorded the CD Moonwalk.

He is the artistic director of the Scuola di Musica di Fiesole (Italy).
