= Arutyun Papazyan =

Armenian pianist

Arutyun Papazyan Հարություն Փափազյան
- Born: 25 May 1954 (age 72); Yerevan, Armenian SSR, Soviet Union
- Genres: Classical
- Occupation: Pianist
- Instrument: Piano

Arutyun Karapeti Papazyan (Note: Armenian: Հարություն Կարապետի Փափազյան, romanized: Harutʻyun Karapeti Pʻapʻazyan; Russian: Арутюн Карапетович Папазян, romanized: Arutyun Karapetovich Papazyan) (born 25 May 1954, known by the diminutive Artur) (Note: Armenian: Արթուր, romanized: Artʻur; Russian: Артур, romanized: Artur) is an Armenian pianist.

Born in Yerevan, Papazyan rose to prominence after winning the 1979 Vianna da Motta International Music Competition and being awarded a 3rd prize in the X International Chopin Piano Competition. He has been internationally active as a concert pianist since.

Arutyun Papazyan and his wife Maral returned to Armenia in early 2000.
