= David Chung =

David Chung may refer to:

- David Chung (football executive) (born 1962), Malaysian-Papua New Guinean sports official and former footballer
- David Chung (golfer) (born 1990), Korean-American golfer
- David Chung (actor) (1946–2006), Korean-American actor
- David Chung (cinematographer) on An Autumn's Tale
- David Chung (artist) (born 1959), musician artist
- David Chung Wai-keung (born 1966), Hong Kong Under Secretary for Innovation and Technology
