= Chung Yung-chi =

Taiwanese weightlifter

Personal information
- Nationality: Taiwanese
- Born: 8 October 1957 (age 67)

Sport
- Sport: Weightlifting

Chung Yung-chi (born 8 October 1957) is a Taiwanese weightlifter. He competed at the 1984 Summer Olympics and the 1988 Summer Olympics.
