= Yip-Wah Chung =

Hong Kong engineer (born 1950)

Yip-Wah Chung (born 1950) is a materials scientist at Northwestern University. He is a professor of materials science & engineering, and, by courtesy, of mechanical engineering within the McCormick School of Engineering, and serves as co-director of the mechanical engineering–materials science & engineering Master of Science program.

Chung was raised in Hong Kong, and holds a B.S. and an M.S. in physics from the University of Hong Kong, as well as a Ph.D. in physics from the University of California, Berkeley. He joined Northwestern, after obtaining his doctorate; at Northwestern, he previously served as department chair of materials science & engineering (1992–1998).

His research includes work on energy efficiency, surface engineering, and tribology. In 2016, Chung, Jiaxing Huang, and other co-authors published an article in the Proceedings of the National Academy of Sciences describing how a lubricant containing crumpled graphene could provide higher lubrication performance than other lubricant oils. In 2017, Chung was featured in the Northwestern Engineering magazine for his research on improving energy efficiency. The article describes a development by Chung and others on reducing friction within automobiles. Their development, a lubricant additive, "can reduce friction by up to 70 percent and wear by up to 90 percent compared to conventional lubricant counterparts." In 2019, Chung was interviewed by Tribology & Lubrication Technology. In his interview, he expressed sentiment that communication skills are a vital part of career tribology, and are not emphasized enough in education.

In 2002, Chung, Leon M. Keer, and Kornel Ehmann won the Innovative Research Award, conferred by the tribology division of the American Society of Mechanical Engineers. For his contributions to surface engineering and coatings, Chung received the 2024 R.F. Bunshah Award from the Advanced Surface Engineering Division, American Vacuum Society. As of 2024, he is a fellow of ASM International, American Vacuum Society, and the Society of Tribologists and Lubrication Engineers.

== Selected publications ==
- Chung, Yip-Wah; Homola, A. M.; Street, G. Bryan, eds. (1992). Surface Science Investigations in Tribology. ACS Symposium Series. Vol. 485. American Chemical Society. doi:10.1021/bk-1992-0485. ISBN 978-0-8412-2205-2.
- Miyoshi, K.; Chung, Y. W., eds. (1993). Surface Diagnostics in Tribology. Series on Modern Tribology. Vol. 1. World Scientific. doi:10.1142/2130. ISBN 978-981-02-1516-3.
- Chung, Yip-Wah (2002). Practical Guide to Surface Science and Spectroscopy (1st ed.). Academic Press. doi:10.1016/C2009-0-22546-3. ISBN 978-0-12-174610-0.
- Chung, Yip-Wah, ed. (2012). Micro- and Nanoscale Phenomena in Tribology (1st ed.). CRC Press. doi:10.1201/b11211. ISBN 978-0-429-10626-2.
- Wang, Q. Jane; Chung, Yip-Wah, eds. (2013). Encyclopedia of Tribology (1st ed.). Springer. doi:10.1007/978-0-387-92897-5. ISBN 978-0-387-92897-5.
- Chung, Yip-Wah; Kapoor, Monica (2022). Introduction to Materials Science and Engineering (2nd ed.). CRC Press. doi:10.1201/9781003274469. ISBN 978-1-00-327446-9.
