= Chung Trio =

Piano trio

The Chung Trio is a piano trio consisting of Korean siblings. The trio consists of Myung-whun Chung, who plays the piano, Kyung-wha Chung, who plays the violin, and Myung-wha Chung, who plays the cello. The trio performed a program at the Carnegie Hall in December 1982. After their mother, Lee Won-suk, died in May 2011, they performed at Ewha Womans University as a tribute to her. This was the first time the three of them had performed on a stage together in 7 years.
