= X International Chopin Piano Competition =

Piano competition (1980)

The Tenth International Fryderyk Chopin Piano Competition
- Date: 1–20 October 1980
- Venue: National Philharmonic, Warsaw
- Hosted by: Fryderyk Chopin Society
- Winner: (Vietnam) Đặng Thái Sơn

The X International Chopin Piano Competition (Polish: X Międzynarodowy Konkurs Pianistyczny im. Fryderyka Chopina) was held from 1 to 20 October 1980 in Warsaw. Đặng Thái Sơn, who in the final played with an orchestra for the first time in his life, won first prize, becoming the first pianist from Asia to do so. The elimination of Ivo Pogorelić after the third stage was a great source of controversy.

== Awards ==
The competition consisted of three elimination stages and a final with seven pianists.

The following prizes were awarded:

Prize	Winner	
1st place, gold medalist(s)	Đặng Thái Sơn	Vietnam
2nd place, silver medalist(s)	Tatiana Shebanova	Soviet Union
3rd place, bronze medalist(s)	Arutyun Papazyan	Soviet Union
4th	not awarded	
5th	Akiko Ebi	Japan
5th	Ewa Pobłocka	Poland
6th	Erik Berchot	France
6th	Irina Pietrova	Soviet Union
HM	Dan Atanasiu	Romania
HM	Bernard d'Ascoli	France
HM	Angela Hewitt	Canada
HM	Hung-Kuan Chen	Taiwan
HM	Kevin Kenner	United States
HM	Alexander Lonquich	West Germany
HM	Ivo Pogorelić	Yugoslavia
HM	William Wolfram	United States

Three special prizes were awarded:

Special prize	Winner	
Best Performance of a Concerto	Đặng Thái Sơn	Vietnam
Best Performance of a Concerto	Tatiana Shebanova	Soviet Union
Best Performance of Mazurkas	Đặng Thái Sơn	Vietnam
Best Performance of Mazurkas	Ewa Pobłocka	Poland
Best Performance of a Polonaise	Đặng Thái Sơn	Vietnam
Best Performance of a Polonaise	Tatiana Shebanova	Soviet Union

== Jury ==
The jury consisted of:

- (Argentina) Martha Argerich ( (gold) VII)
- (Austria) Paul Badura-Skoda
- (Italy) Rodolfo Caporali
- (Spain) Josep Colom
- (Poland) Halina Czerny-Stefańska ( (gold) IV)
- (Soviet Union) Sergei Dorensky
- (Poland) Jan Ekier
- (Bulgaria) Liuba Enczewa
- (East Germany) Rudolf Fischer
- (Poland) Lidia Grychtołówna
- (Canada) Iving Heller
- (Australia) Rex Hobcroft
- (West Germany) Ludwig Hoffmann
- (Poland) Andrzej Jasiński
- (France) Geneviève Joy
- (United Kingdom) Louis Kentner
- (Poland) Kazimierz Kord (chairman)
- (United States) Eugene List
- (Switzerland) Nikita Magaloff (vice-chairman)
- (Czechoslovakia) Frantisek Rauch (vice-chairman)
- (Poland) Regina Smendzianka
- (Hungary) Péter Solymos
- (Poland) Zbigniew Śliwiński
- (Japan) Kazuko Yasukawa
- (Poland) Tadeusz Żmudziński

=== Pogorelić Scandal ===
There was a sensation at the 1980 Chopin Competition in Warsaw when, in a decision going against audience opinion, Ivo Pogorelić was not admitted to the final round because of his unconventional interpretations of Chopin's works. This came about because of a wide discrepancy in the jury's marking; half the panel of judges gave him the highest number of points and half the lowest. He was awarded only a special prize for his "exceptionally original pianistic talent". Others were less fond of his modern approach to Chopin.

Jury member Eugene List explained: "I'm the first to say that the boy is very talented [...] but I voted very low for him. This is a special kind of competition. It's only Chopin. He doesn't respect the music. He uses extremes to the point of distortion. And he puts on too much of an act." Louis Kentner resigned after the first stage after all of his students had been eliminated from the competition, saying that "if people like Pogorelić make it to the second stage, I cannot participate in the work of the jury. We have different aesthetic criteria."

In the third stage, Pogorelić once again caused controversy, performing his program in the wrong order, leaving the stage part way through, and wearing an extravagant concert attire that Martha Argerich described as making him look like "a prince dropped in the middle of the desert". In the end, Pogorelić was not admitted into the final. Argerich resigned in protest, proclaiming him a "genius" and previously likening him to Vladimir Horowitz who "her colleagues could not appreciate because of an entrenched conservatism", which is "why she was ashamed to be associated with them". Nikita Magaloff and Paul Badura-Skoda announced their solidarity with Argerich, though coming short of resigning themselves, declaring that it was "unthinkable that such an artist should not make it to the finals". According to Đặng Thái Sơn, the eventual winner, Argerich still sent a public telegram to Warsaw to congratulate him, after learning the final results.

Pogorelić later accused in a one-sided interview in 1993, claiming that "The Soviet Bloc authorities had decided months before the competition that it was politically necessary to have a North Vietnamese winner. My decision to participate was not at all welcome. I was told I should wait a year, for the Tchaikovsky competition, when I would have the first prize guaranteed." In 2008, he demanded an official inquiry into the jury decisions of the 1980 competition, however, the Chopin Institute refused to reopen the case.
