= Myung-wha Chung =

South Korean musician (born 1944)

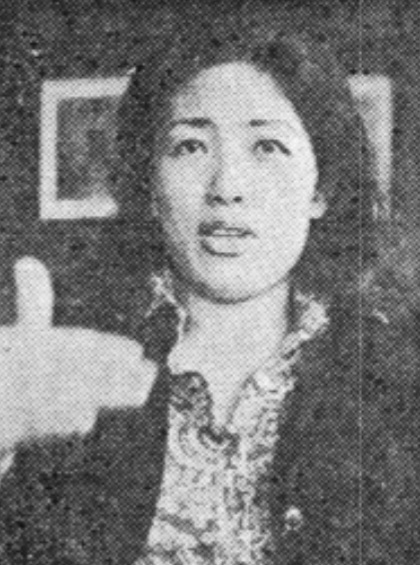

Korean name
- Hangul: 정명화
- Hanja: 鄭明和
- RR: Jeong Myeonghwa
- MR: Chŏng Myŏnghwa

Myung-wha Chung (Korean: 정명화; born 19 March 1944) is a South Korean cellist.

== Biography ==
Myung-wha Chung was born in 1944 in Seoul, Japanese Korea (today South Korea), to a musical family. Her younger sister is the violinist Kyung-wha Chung, and her younger brother is the pianist/conductor Myung-whun Chung.

She finished her high school studies at the Seoul Arts High School, and made her debut with the Seoul Philharmonic Orchestra, before continuing her studies in the USA.

She was a pupil of Leonard Rose at the Juilliard School in New York City between 1961 and 1965. Following that, she then studied with Gregor Piatigorsky at the University of Southern California in Los Angeles between 1965 and 1968.

She made her U.S. concert debut in San Francisco in 1969, and her European debut at Spoleto, Italy, in 1969. In that same year, she also had the honor of performing at the White House.

In 1971, she won the Geneva International Music Competition (cello division).

Besides her international concert career as a soloist, playing with the world's leading conductors and orchestras, she also plays chamber music partnering her siblings as the Chung Trio.

Her cello is the 1731 "Braga" Stradivarius.

== Teaching ==
She is professor of cello at Mannes College of Music in New York, and head of the cello faculty at the Korea National University of Arts, the School of Music in Seoul.

== Awards ==
- San Francisco Symphony Award, 1967
- First Prize (cello), Geneva International Music Competition, 1971
- National Order of Cultural Merit, South Korea, 1992
- Excellence 2000 Award ("for outstanding contribution to American society in the field of music"), US Pan-Asian Chamber of Commerce

== Discography ==
Myung-wha Chung has recorded for the major classical music labels, both as a soloist and as the Chung Trio. Her highlight recordings include:

- Beethoven – Piano Trios (EMI, 1994, reissued 2007)
- Beethoven – Archduke Trio (Deutsche Grammophon, 1998)
- Brahms/Mendelssohn – Piano Trios (Decca, 1995)
- Tchaikovsky – Rococo Variations. With the Los Angeles Philharmonic Orchestra conducted by Charles Dutoit. (Decca, SXL 6955 (411 210–1)

== Extra-musical activities ==
- Goodwill Ambassador for the UN Drug Control Program (UNDCP), appointed 1992
- Goodwill Ambassador for UNICEF in Korea
- Special envoy for the City of Seoul
