= Koo Chung =

American singer-songwriter

- Koo Chung

Background information
- Birth name: Koo Chung
- Origin: United States
- Genres: Contemporary Christian, pop/rock
- Occupation: Singer-songwriter
- Instrument(s): Guitar, voice
- Years active: 1998–present
- Labels: Broken for Good Records
- Website: http://www.koochung.com

Koo Chung is a Korean American Christian singer-songwriter. Beginning his career with the band Broken for Good in Boston, MA, Chung moved to New York City to start and run his own studio and label, Broken for Good Records.

== Discography ==
=== Albums ===
Album	Release date	Label
Commas Come First	October 2002	Broken for Good Records
While We Wait	April 5, 2004	Broken for Good Records
Akoostic Sessions	November 11, 2005	Broken for Good Records
Parallel	June 8, 2006	Broken for Good Records

=== Singles and EPs ===
Single/EP	Release date	Label	Format(s)	Notes
Still Holding On EP		Self-released	CD	
