= Kyung Wha Chung =

South Korean violinist (born 1948)

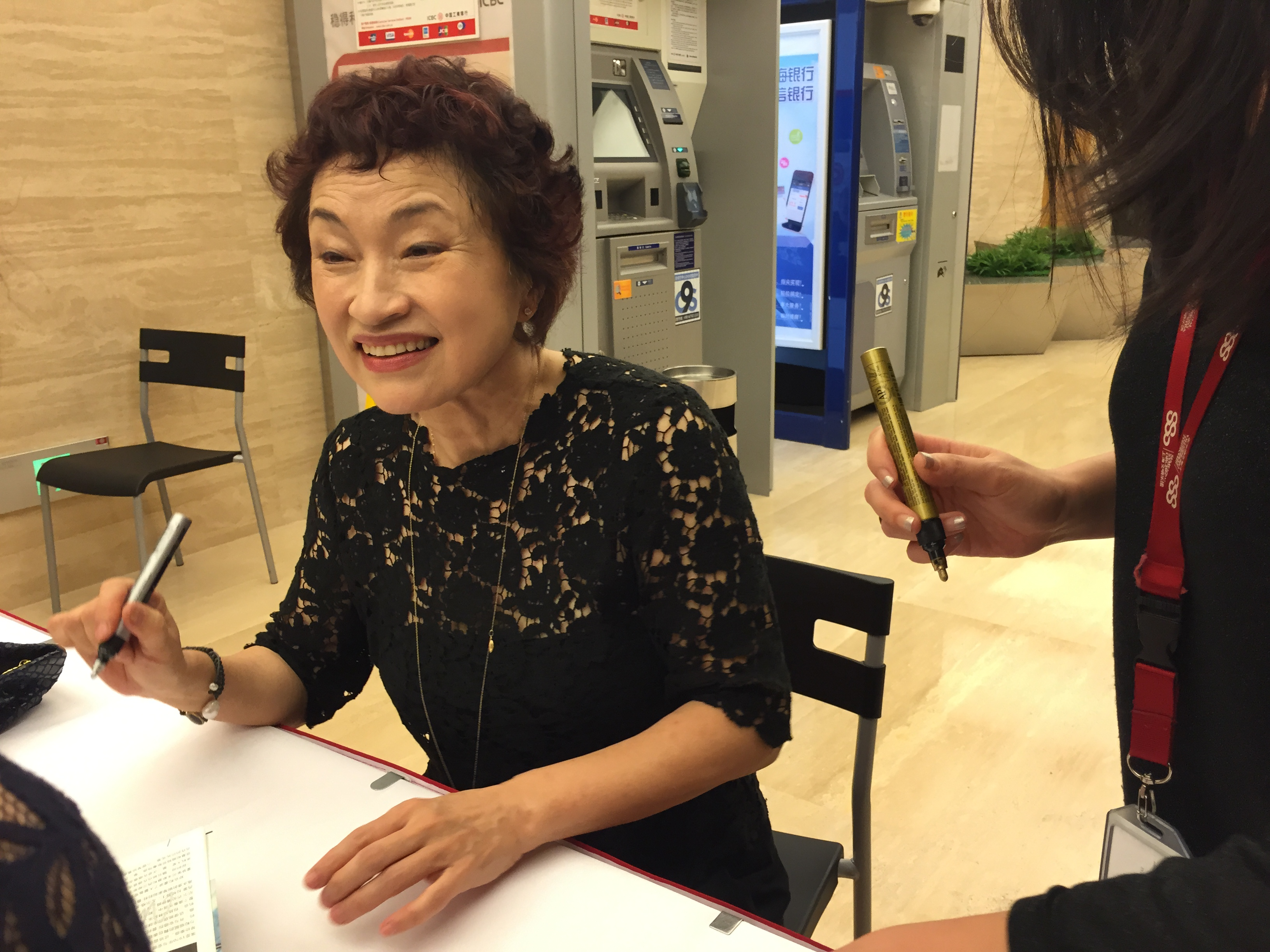

Background information
- Born: 26 March 1948 (age 77); Seoul, South Korea
- Occupation: Violinist

Korean name
- Hangul: 정경화
- Hanja: 鄭京和
- RR: Jeong Gyeonghwa
- MR: Chŏng Kyŏnghwa

Kyung Wha Chung (Korean: 정경화; born 26 March 1948) is a South Korean violinist.

== Early years and education ==
Kyung Wha Chung was born in Seoul as the middle child among seven siblings. Her father worked as an exporter, and her mother operated a restaurant. She started taking piano lessons at the age of four and began learning the violin at the age of seven, where she demonstrated a greater aptitude for the violin. She became recognized as a child prodigy, and by the age of 9 she was already playing the Mendelssohn Violin Concerto with the Seoul Philharmonic Orchestra. As time progressed she won most of the famous music competitions in Korea. With her siblings, Chung toured around the country, performing music both as a soloist and as a part of an ensemble. As the children became famous in Korea, Chung's mother felt that it was too small a country for her children to further their musical careers, and she decided to move to the United States. All of Chung's siblings played classical instruments and three of them would become professional musicians. Her younger brother, Myung-whun Chung is a conductor and a pianist, and her older sister, Myung-wha Chung is a cellist and teacher at the Korean National University of Arts in Seoul. The three of them began performing professionally later in their careers as the Chung Trio.

At age thirteen, she arrived in the United States. She followed her older flautist sister Myung-Soh Chung in attending the Juilliard School in New York, where she studied with Ivan Galamian.

== Musical career ==
In 1967, Chung and Pinchas Zukerman were the joint winners of the Edgar Leventritt Competition, the first time for such an outcome in the history of the competition. This prize led to several engagements in North America including performances with the Chicago Symphony Orchestra and the New York Philharmonic. She substituted for Nathan Milstein for his White House Gala when he became indisposed.

Her next big opportunity came in 1970 as a substitute for Itzhak Perlman, with the London Symphony Orchestra. The success of this engagement led to many other performances in the United Kingdom and a recording contract with Decca/London. Her debut album with André Previn and London Symphony Orchestra, which coupled Tchaikovsky and Sibelius concertos, brought her international attention, including the top recommendation on the BBC Radio 3's Building a Library programme, which compared the various recordings of the Sibelius. In Europe, Chung continued her musical studies with Joseph Szigeti.

Her commercial recordings include core repertoire violin concerti, including Beethoven, Tchaikovsky, and Berg. She has recorded chamber works including the Brahms violin sonatas, Franck & Debussy sonatas, and Respighi & Strauss sonatas (with Krystian Zimerman, a recording which earned her a Gramophone Award for Best Chamber Recording). Other recordings include Vivaldi's Four Seasons, which was selected as Gramophone's editorial choice, and the Brahms violin concerto with the Vienna Philharmonic under Simon Rattle.

In 1997, she celebrated the 30th anniversary of her international debut at Barbican Centre in London and in her hometown of Seoul, South Korea. In 2008, illness and injury caused her to temporarily halt her performing career Her next return to live performance was in London at the Royal Festival Hall in December 2014. However, her reaction to the audience coughing, including a persistent cough from a child in her line of vision and her subsequent speaking to the child's parents, caused widely reported controversy at this performance.

Chung has two sons, Frederick and Eugene, from her past marriage to the British businessman Geoffrey Leggett. Their 1984 marriage ended in divorce.

=== Educator ===
In 2007, Chung joined Juilliard as a member of the faculty of the school's Music and Pre-College Divisions. She received the Kyung-Ahm Prize in 2005. In 2011, she received the Ho-Am Prize in the Arts division in recognition of her 40-year-long career as a violinist and educator.

== Discography ==
=== Solo recordings ===
Year of issue	Album details	Collaborating artists	Record label	First Issue
1970	Tchaikovsky: Violin Concerto / Sibelius: Violin Concerto	London Symphony Orchestra (conducted by André Previn)	Decca	SXL 6493
1972	Bruch: Violin Concerto / Scottish Fantasia	Royal Philharmonic Orchestra (conducted by Rudolf Kempe)	Decca	SXL 6573
1973	Walton: Violin Concerto / Stravinsky: Violin Concerto	London Symphony Orchestra (conducted by André Previn)	Decca	SXL 6601
1975	Bach: Partita No. 2 in D minor; Sonata No. 3 in C Major		Decca	SXL 6721
1976	Saint-Saëns: Violin Concerto No. 3 / Vieuxtemps: Violin Concerto No. 5	London Symphony Orchestra (conducted by Lawrence Foster)	Decca	SXL 6759
1977	Prokofiev: Violin Concertos Nos. 1 & 2	London Symphony Orchestra (conducted by André Previn)	Decca	SXL 6773
1977	Bartók: Violin Concerto No. 2	London Philharmonic Orchestra (conducted by Sir Georg Solti)	Decca	SXL 6802
1977	Elgar: Violin Concerto	London Philharmonic Orchestra (conducted by Sir Georg Solti)	Decca	SXL 6842
1978	Saint-Saëns: Havanaise; Introduction and Rondo / Chausson: Poeme / Ravel: Tzigane	London Philharmonic Orchestra (conducted by Charles Dutoit)	Decca	SXL 6851
1980	Beethoven: Violin Concerto	Vienna Philharmonic (conducted by Kirill Kondrashin)	Decca	SXDL 7508
1980	Franck: Violin Sonata / Debussy: Violin Sonata	Radu Lupu	Decca	SXL 6944
1980	Mendelssohn: Piano Trio No. 1 / Schumann: Piano Trio No. 1	André Previn (Piano); Paul Tortelier (Cello)	His Master's Voice	ASD 3894
1981	Bach: Trio Sonatas BWV 1038, 1039 & 1079	James Galway (Flute); Phillip Moll (Harpsichord); Moray Welsh (Cello)	RCA Red Seal	
1981	Lalo: Symphonie Espagnole / Saint-Saëns: Violin Concerto No. 1	Montreal Symphony Orchestra (conducted by Charles Dutoit)	Decca	SXDL 7527
1982	Tchaikovsky: Violin Concerto / Mendelssohn: Violin Concerto	Montreal Symphony Orchestra (conducted by Charles Dutoit)	Decca	SXDL 7558
1984	Berg: Violin Concerto / Bartók: Violin Concerto No. 1	Chicago Symphony Orchestra (conducted by Sir Georg Solti)	Decca	411 804-1
1987	Con Amore (Romantic violin works by Kreisler and other composers)	Phillip Moll (Piano)	Decca	417 289-1
1988	Franck: Violin Sonata / Debussy: Violin Sonata /	Phillip Moll (Piano)	Decca	
1989	Dvořák: Violin Concerto Op. 53; Romance Op. 11	Philadelphia Orchestra (conducted by Riccardo Muti)	EMI	
1989	Strauss: Violin Sonata Op. 18 / Respighi: Violin Sonata	Krystian Zimerman (Piano)	Deutsche Grammophon	
1989	Beethoven: Violin Concerto / Bruch: Violin Concerto	London Philharmonic Orchestra (conducted by Klaus Tennstedt)	EMI	
2001	Vivaldi: Le Quattro Stagioni, The Four Seasons	St Luke's Chamber Ensemble (part of Orchestra of St. Luke's)	EMI Classics	
2016	Bach Sonatas & Partitas		Warner Classics	0190295944162
2018	Beau Soir – Fauré, Franck, Debussy – Works for Violin and Piano	Kevin Kenner (Piano)	Warner Classics	0190295708085

=== Chung trio recordings ===
Year of issue	Album details	Collaborating artists	Record label
1986	Dvořák: Piano Trios Nos. 1 & 3	Myung-wha Chung (Cello); Myung-whun Chung (Piano)	Decca
1987	Mendelssohn: Piano Trio No. 1 / Brahms: Piano Trio No. 1	Myung-wha Chung (Cello); Myung-whun Chung (Piano)	Decca
1988	Tchaikovsky: Piano Trio in A Minor / Shostakovich: Piano Trio No. 1	Myung-wha Chung (Cello); Myung-whun Chung (Piano)	EMI
1988	Beethoven: Triple Concerto; Two Romances	Myung-wha Chung (Cello); Myung-whun Chung (Piano); Philharmonia Orchestra (conducted by Myung-whun Chung)	Deutsche Grammophon
1992	Beethoven: Piano Trio Nos. 4 & 7 "Archduke"	Myung-wha Chung (Cello); Myung-whun Chung (Piano)	EMI

See Kyung-Wha Chung discography at discogs.com
