= Đặng Thái Sơn =

Vietnamese pianist (born 1958)

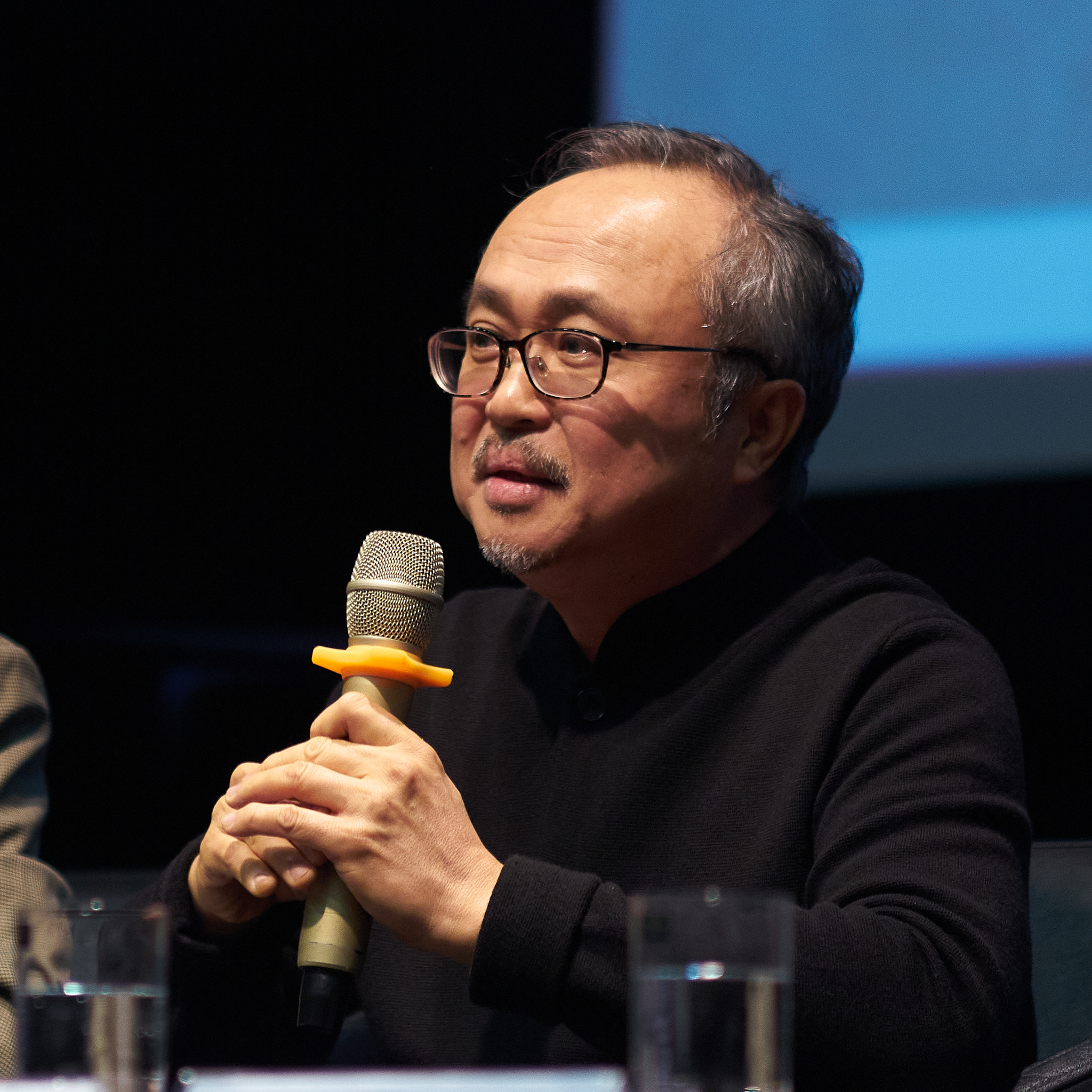
- Dang Thai Son in 2021
- Born: July 2, 1958 (age 68); Hanoi, North Vietnam
- Citizenship: Vietnam; Canada
- Education: Pyotr Tchaikovsky Conservatory
- Occupation: Pianist
- Years active: 1976–present
- Title: People's Artist
- Parents: Đặng Đình Hưng (father); Thái Thị Liên (mother)
- Awards: (gold) First Prize; 10th International Fryderyk Chopin Piano Competition (1980)

Signature
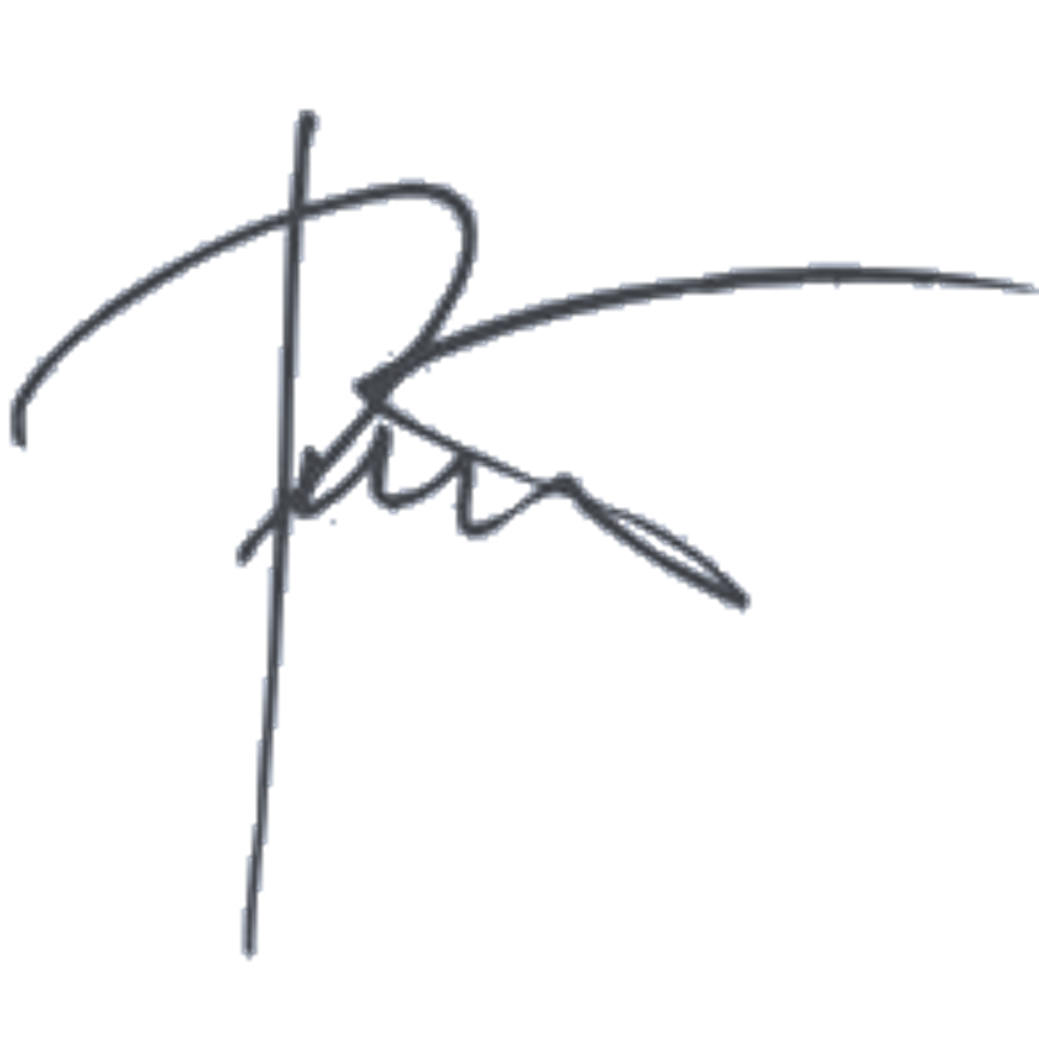

Đặng Thái Sơn (born July 2, 1958) is a Vietnamese and Canadian classical pianist. In 1980, he won the X International Chopin Piano Competition in Warsaw, becoming the first pianist from Asia to do so. He has received particular acclaim for the sonority and poetry in his interpretations of Chopin and the French repertoire.

== Career ==
Dang began studying the piano in Hanoi with his mother, Madame Thai Thi Lien, then a professor at the Vietnam National Academy of Music. Discovered by the Russian pianist Isaac Katz who was on visit to Vietnam in 1974, he pursued his advanced study at the Tchaikovsky Conservatory of Music in Moscow (Russia) with Vladimir Natanson and Dmitry Bashkirov.

In 1980, he won the First Prize at the X International Chopin Piano Competition in Warsaw, becoming the first Asian to win a top international competition.

In the 1980s, because of his Vietnamese citizenship, Dang could not move freely among Western countries to perform; he needed approval from the Vietnamese government to attend a concert, and each visa application took two months. He said he "lost opportunities to make a career because of these political difficulties". But since then, Dang has performed in more than 40 countries and on concert stages such as Lincoln Center (New York), Barbican Center (London), Salle Pleyel (Paris), Herculessaal (Munich), Musikverein (Vienna), Concertgebouw (Amsterdam), Sydney Opera House, and Suntory Hall (Tokyo).

He has played with many renowned orchestras, including the following:

- Czech Republic:
  - Czech Philharmonic Orchestra
  - Prague Symphony
- France:
  - Orchestre de chambre de Paris
  - Orchestre de Paris
  - Ensemble Orchestral de Paris
- Germany:
  - Dresden Philharmonic
  - Staatskapelle Berlin
- Japan:
  - New Japan Philharmonic
  - NHK Symphony
- Poland:
  - Sinfonia Varsovia
  - Warsaw National Philharmonic Orchestra
- Russia:
  - Moscow Philharmonic
  - Moscow Virtuosi
  - Russian National Orchestra
  - St Petersburg Philharmonic
- United Kingdom:
  - BBC Philharmonic
  - City of Birmingham Symphony Orchestra
  - Philharmonia Orchestra
- Other countries:
  - Helsinki Philharmonic
  - Hungarian State Symphony
  - Montreal Symphony Orchestra
  - Oslo Philharmonic
  - Sydney Symphony
  - Vienna Chamber Orchestra
  - Zurich Chamber Orchestra

Dang has appeared under the direction of Sir Neville Marriner, Vladimir Ashkenazy, Pinchas Zukerman, Mariss Jansons, Paavo Järvi, Ivan Fischer, Frans Brüggen, Vladimir Spivakov, Dimitri Kitaenko, and Sakari Oramo. He has performed chamber music with the Berlin Philharmonic Octet, the Smetana String Quartet, Barry Tuckwell, Tsuyoshi Tsutsumi, Pinchas Zukerman, Boris Belkin, Joseph Suk, and Alexander Rudin, and he has played duo-piano with Andrei Gavrilov.

Other career highlights include a New Year's Day concert (1995) with Yo Yo Ma, Seiji Ozawa, Kathleen Battle, and Mstislav Rostropovich, in a major international event produced by the Japanese Broadcasting Corporation NHK; in January 1999, a Gala-concert opening the Chopin year, where he was the only foreign artist invited to appear as soloist with the Warsaw National Opera Theatre Orchestra; concerts in Isaac Stern's last festival in Miyazaki, Japan in 2001, which included three performances with Pinchas Zukerman; a special performance in 2005 as the only guest artist at the Opening Gala Concert of the XV International Chopin Piano Competition, where he was also a member of the jury. In honor of Chopin's 200th birthday in 2010, he played at the Gala Concert the Concerto in F minor with the Orchestra of the Eighteenth Century under Brüggen's direction at the Warsaw National Opera Theatre.

Alongside his career, Dang is a devoted educator. He is frequently invited to give master classes around the world, such as the special class in Berlin in 1999, where he taught alongside Murray Perahia and Vladimir Ashkenazy. He has sat on the juries of prestigious competitions such as the Warsaw International Chopin Piano Competition (2005, 2010, 2015, 2021 & 2025), Cleveland (USA), Clara Haskil (Switzerland), Artur Rubinstein (Tel-Aviv), Hamamatsu, Sendai (Japan), Piano Masters of Monte Carlo, Sviatoslav Richter (Moscow), Prague Spring International, Montreal International Piano Competition, and Ferruccio Busoni International Piano Competition etc.

He was a visiting professor at the Kunitachi College of Music, and a professor at the Université de Montréal for 20 years. Dang joined the piano faculty at the Oberlin Conservatory of Music in 2018 and then the New England Conservatory in the Fall of 2020. He was named as Specially appointed Professor of Beijing Advanced Innovation Center for Chinese National School of Music and China Conservatory of Music. In June 2019, he was invited to be the honorary Professor at the Central Conservatory of Music in Beijing, China as well as visiting professor at the Taiwan National Normal University.

His influence as a teacher is reflected in the remarkable success of his students, including Bruce Xiaoyu Liu, and Eric Lu, whose consecutive victories at the Chopin Competition in 2021 and 2025 have further cemented Dang Thai Son's reputation as one of the most influential pianists and pedagogues of his generation. Other pupils from his studio - including Zitong Wang, Kai-Min Chang, JJ Bui, and Seahyun Kim - have also garnered top prizes at prestigious international competitions such as the Chopin International Competition in Warsaw, the Leeds International Piano Competition, and the Long-Thibaud International Piano Competition, among others.

During the 2012–13 season, Dang toured the world with an ambitious program of all five Beethoven piano concertos, the Beethoven Marathon. This project was considered the most significant since he won the International Chopin Piano Competition in 1980.

Dang won the Prix Opus in the 2016 "Concert of the Year" category for his concert presented by the Fondation Arte Musica at the Musee de Beaux Arts' Bourgie Hall in Montreal.

In September 2018, Ministry of Culture of Poland awarded Dang the gold Medal for Merit to Culture – Gloria Artis, the highest level of distinction awarded to distinguished contributions to Polish culture and national heritage.

Dang Thai Son received the "Doctor Honoris Causa" from the Bydgoszcz Music Academy - "Feliks Nowowiejski", Poland.

== Discography ==
Dang Thai Son has recorded for Deutsche Grammophon, Melodiya, Polskie Nagrania Muza, CBS Sony, Analekta, Victor JVC, and the Fryderyk Chopin Institute.

In 2013, Dang's album "Chopin's Concertos", on the Fryderyk Chopin Institute label, was awarded a Platinum Disc by the Polish Association of Audio-Video Producers for sales of over 10,000 copies. This disc features recordings of the Chopin Piano Concertos on a 1849 Erard piano and period instruments under the baton of Frans Brüggen and his Orchestra of the Eighteenth Century, documenting two memorable events in the festival "Chopin and his Europe" in 2005 and 2006.

Two recording projects were released in 2017. The first is a Schubert recording with Victor Kenwood Japan, a company Dang has worked with since 1995. The second recording is devoted to Paderewski's compositions, including the Piano Concerto in A minor and a selection of solo works. The Piano Concerto was recorded live with the Philharmonia Orchestra under the baton of Vladimir Ashkenazy during the "Chopin and his Europe" Festival in Warsaw on August 29, 2015. This recording was selected as "La clef du mois" (Disc of the Month) by ResMusica (Paris, France).

Dang was chosen by Deutsche Grammophon, in partnership with The Frederyk Chopin Institute, to be featured as one of the artists on its two-volume recording of Chopin on period instruments.
