= Guangming Zhong =

Microbiologist

Guangming Zhong is a microbiologist who is currently Dielmann Endowed Chair of Genetic and Environmental Risk at University of Texas Health Science Center at San Antonio. His lab works on microbial interactions and the development of vaccines for chlamydial infection.

He holds an MD in preventive medicine and MS in microbiology from Xiangya Medical School, Central South University, China, and completed his PhD in microbiology at the University of Manitoba, Canada.

He has an h-index of 54 according to Semantic Scholar.
