= Fengshen Bang =

Fengshen Bang (Chinese: 封神榜), meaning a register of deities, may refer to:

- Investiture of the Gods, 16th-century Chinese novel of the gods and demons genre
- List of gods in the Investiture of the Gods, referred to as Fengshen Bang in the novel Investiture of the Gods.
