= Chung Dong-kee =

South Korean volleyball player (born 1949)

Chung Don-key

Personal information
- Born: October 12, 1949 (age 77); South Korea

Best results
Result
Participation Medal

- Chung Dong-kee
- Hangul: 정동기
- Hanja: 鄭東基
- RR: Jeong Donggi
- MR: Chŏng Tonggi

Chung Don-key (born 12 October 1949) is a South Korean former volleyball player who competed in the 1972 Summer Olympics.
