= Myung-whun Chung =

South Korean pianist and conductor

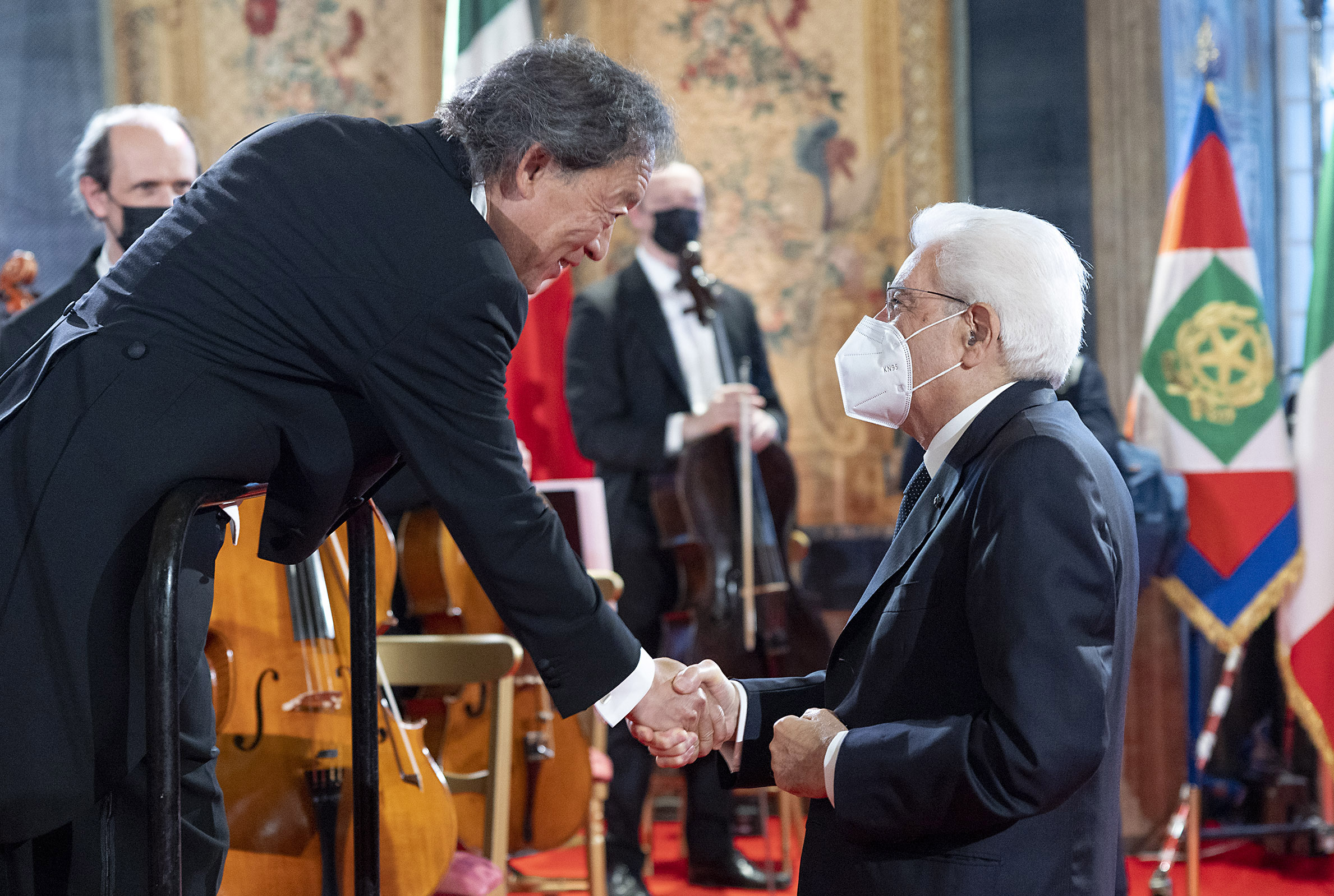
- Chung (left) shaking Sergio Mattarella's hand (right) in 2022
- Born: 22 January 1953 (age 73); Seoul, South Korea
- Occupations: Pianist, conductor
- Relatives: Sisters Kyung-wha Chung and Myung-wha Chung
- Awards: Geumgwan Order of Cultural Merit (1996)

Korean name
- Hangul: 정명훈
- Hanja: 鄭明勳
- RR: Jeong Myeonghun
- MR: Chŏng Myŏnghun
- IPA: tɕʌŋ.mjʌŋhun

Myung-whun Chung (Korean: 정명훈; born 22 January 1953) is a South Korean conductor and pianist.

== Career ==
=== Performer ===
Chung studied piano with Maria Curcio and won joint second-prize in the 1974 International Tchaikovsky Competition. He performed in the Chung Trio with his sisters, violinist Kyung-wha Chung and cellist Myung-wha Chung.

=== Conducting and musical direction ===
Chung studied conducting at the Mannes College of Music and the Juilliard School. He has conducted virtually all the prominent European and American orchestras, including the Metropolitan Opera in New York, the Los Angeles Philharmonic, the Chicago Philharmonic, the Berlin Philharmonic, and the Vienna Philharmonic, among others.

Chung was chief conductor of the Rundfunk-Sinfonieorchester Saarbrücken from 1984 to 1990, and principal guest conductor of the Teatro Comunale Florence from 1987 to 1992. At the end of the 1987–88 season, he received the Premio Abbiati award from Italian critics, and the following year was awarded the Arturo Toscanini prize. Chung was the Paris Opera's music director from 1989 to 1994, during which time he opened the inaugural season of the then-new Opéra Bastille. For the opening, he performed Berlioz's complete Les Troyens to high praise from critics. In 1991, the Association of French Theatres and Music Critics named him "Artist of the year". In 1992, he received the Legion d'Honneur for his contribution to the Paris Opéra. In 1995, he was honoured three times at the French Victoires de la Musiques Classiques, and was also named Meilleur Chef d'Orchestre de l'Année. He directed the world premiere of Messiaen's last work: the Concert à quatre for four soloists and orchestra, which the composer had dedicated to Myung-whun Chung and the Orchestre de la Bastille.

Chung took the role of artistic director at the Asia Philharmonic Orchestra in 1997 and at the Orchestre philharmonique de Radio France in 2000. The Tokyo Philharmonic Orchestra made Chung a Special Artistic Advisor in 2001, its Honorary Conductor Laureate in 2010, and its Honorary Music Director from 2016. Chung became the first principal guest conductor in the history of the Staatskapelle Dresden in 2012. He was the Seoul Philharmonic Orchestra's principal conductor between 2005 and 2015. During this period, the Seoul Philharmonic became the first Asian orchestra to sign a major-label record deal and gave its first performance at The Proms.

In May 2025, La Scala announced the appointment of Chung as its next music director, effective in 2027. In December 2025, the KBS Symphony Orchestra announced the re-appointment of Chung as its music director, effective in January 2026, with an initial contract through December 2028. Chung had previously served as chief conductor of the orchestra in 1998.

=== Recordings ===
Chung has been an exclusive recording artist for Deutsche Grammophon since 1990. His recordings have included:

- Messiaen: Turangalîla-Symphonie, Éclairs sur l'au-delà...
- Verdi: Otello
- Berlioz: Symphonie fantastique
- Ravel: La Valse with the Seoul Philharmonic Orchestra
- Rimsky-Korsakov: Sheherazade
- Stravinsky: Firebird Suite
- Shostakovich: Lady Macbeth of Mtsensk with the Opéra Bastille Orchestra
- Dvořák: symphonies and serenades with the Vienna Philharmonic
- Beethoven: Für Elise
- Bizet: L'Arlesienne Suite No. 1 with the Opéra Bastille Orchestra
- Requiems of Maurice Duruflé and of Gabriel Fauré, with the Orchestra dell'Accademia Nazionale di Santa Cecilia

== Honours ==
- Premio Franco Abbiati, 1988
- Arturo Toscanini prize, 1989
- 'Artist of the Year' (The Association of French Theatres and Music Critics), 1991
- Legion of Honour, 1992
- Conductor of the year (Victoires de la musique classique), 1995
- Order of Cultural Merit (Korea), 1996
- Ho-Am Prize in the Arts, 1997
- Ordre des Arts et des Lettres, Commandeur, 2011
- Order of the Star of Italy, Commander, 2017
- Order of the Star of Italy, Grand Officer, 2022
- UNESCO 'Man of the Year', 1995

In addition to being awarded numerous music prizes, Myung-whun Chung has also been honoured with Korea's most distinguished cultural award 'Kumkwan' for his contribution to Korean musical life. Chung served as Ambassador for the Drug Control Program at the United Nations and was Korea's first Honorary Cultural Ambassador.

Cultural offices
Preceded by Hans Zender	Chief Conductor, Rundfunk-Sinfonieorchester Saarbrücken; 1984–1990	Succeeded by Marcello Viotti
Preceded by Daniel Barenboim	Music Director, Opéra Bastille; 1989–1994	Succeeded by James Conlon
Preceded by Othmar Maga	Chief Conductor, KBS Symphony Orchestra; 1998	Succeeded by Dmitri Kitayenko
Preceded by Marek Janowski	Music Director, Orchestre philharmonique de Radio France; 2000–2015	Succeeded by Mikko Franck
Preceded by Seung Gwak	Music Director, Seoul Philharmonic Orchestra; 2005–2015	Succeeded by Osmo Vänskä
Preceded by Pietari Inkinen	Music Director, KBS Symphony Orchestra; 2026–present	Succeeded by incumbent
