= 1967 New Year Honours =

British royal recognitions

The New Year Honours 1967 were appointments in many of the Commonwealth realms of Queen Elizabeth II to various orders and honours to reward and highlight good works by citizens of those countries. They were announced on 1 January 1967 to celebrate the year passed and mark the beginning of 1967.

The recipients of honours are displayed here as they were styled before their new honour, and arranged by honour, with classes (Knight, Knight Grand Cross, etc.) and then divisions (Military, Civil, etc.) as appropriate.

== United Kingdom and Colonies ==
=== Life Peer ===
Baroness

- Beatrice Serota, JP. For services to welfare of children.

Baron

- Sir Willis Jackson. For services to Technology.
- The Very Reverend Sir George Fielden Macleod, Bt., MC, DD, Leader of the Iona Community.
- Sir Charles Richard Morris, KCMG, lately Vice-Chancellor, University of Leeds, and for services to University Education.
- Sir Robert Platt, Bt., MD, FRCP, Emeritus Professor of Medicine, University of Manchester.
- Sir Harold Woolley, CBE. For services to Agriculture.

=== Privy Councillor ===
- The Right Honourable Arthur Joseph, Baron Champion, Minister without Portfolio and Deputy Leader of the House of Lords since 1964.
- Sir Geoffrey Stanley de Freitas, KCMG, MP, President, Consultative Assembly of the Council of Europe.
- Sir Eric George Molyneux Fletcher, MP, Member for East Islington since 1945. Deputy Speaker and Chairman of Ways and Means, House of Commons.
- The Honourable Mr. Justice Karminski (Sir Seymour Edward Karminski), Judge of the High Court of Justice.
- William Stephen Ian Whitelaw, MC, MP, Member of Parliament for the Penrith and Border Division of Cumberland since 1955. Opposition Chief Whip since November 1964.

=== Knight Bachelor ===
- Leonard Barford, Chief Inspector of Taxes, Board of Inland Revenue.
- Frederick Charles Bawden, Director, Rothamsted Experimental Station, Harpenden, Hertfordshire.
- Lieutenant-Colonel Alderman Ian Frank Bowater, DSO, TD, Sheriff of the City of London.
- Neville Cardus, CBE. For services to cricket and music.
- Rupert Charles Hart-Davis. For services to Literature.
- Norman Randall Elliott, CBE, Chairman, South of Scotland Electricity Board.
- Trevor Maldwyn Evans, CBE, Industrial Editor, Daily Express.
- Samuel Fisher, JP. For services to Local Government in the Inner London area.
- Sidney William George Ford, MBE, President, National Union of Mineworkers.
- William Frederick Houghton, Education Officer, Inner London Education Authority.
- Alexander Grigor Jeans, TD, Chairman, Managing Director and Editor-in-Chief, Liverpool Daily Post and Echo, Ltd.
- Francis Charles McLean, CBE, Director of Engineering, British Broadcasting Corporation.
- Harold Lancelot Roy Matthews, CBE, Chairman, White Fish Authority.
- Joseph Thomas Molony, QC, lately Chairman of the Bar Council.
- His Honour Judge Owen Temple Temple-Morris, QC, Judge of the County Courts.
- Alfred James Nicholas, CBE, Chairman, Aberdare Holdings Ltd. For services to Wales.
- Peter Scott Noble, Principal, King's College London.
- Michael Willcox Perrin, CBE, Chairman (Treasurer), Board of Governors, St. Bartholomew's Hospital, London; Chairman, The Wellcome Foundation, Ltd.
- Alfred Ernest Ramsey, Manager, England Association Football World Cup Team.
- Stanley Edward Raymond, Chairman, British Railways Board.
- John Anthony Ewart Reiss, BEM, Chairman, Associated Portland Cement Manufacturers Ltd.
- Frank Rostron, MBE, Chairman, Cotton Board.
- Colonel Thomas Eric St Johnston, CBE, Chief Constable, Lancashire Constabulary.
- James Steel, CBE. For services to industrial development in the North East.
- William Swallow, lately Chairman and Managing Director, Vauxhall Motors Ltd. For services to Export.
- Alderman Robert Evan Thomas, JP. For services to Local Government in Manchester.
- Edward Hugh Dudley Thompson, MBE, TD, Chairman and Chief Executive, Allied Breweries, Ltd. For services to Export.
- Ronald Ernest Tunbridge, OBE, MD, FRCP, Professor of Medicine, University of Leeds.
- George Andrew Wheatley, CBE, Clerk of the County Council and Clerk of the Peace, Hampshire.
- John Clermont Witt. For services to the Arts.
- Henry Peart Wood, CBE, Principal, Jordanhill College of Education, Glasgow.

Diplomatic Service and Overseas List

- Donald Falshaw, lately Chief Justice of the High Court, Punjab, India.
- John Ortcheson, CBE, lately Senior Judge of the High Court of West Pakistan.

State of New South Wales

- Warwick Oswald Fairfax. For services to the community.
- Clarence Roy McKerihan, CBE. For services to the rural community and to hospital and other welfare activities.

State of Victoria

- Harold Roy Fidge, Mayor of Geelong.
- Robert Vincent Monahan, a Puisne Judge of the Supreme Court.

State of Queensland

- Bruce Shearer, CMG, of Brisbane. For public and social welfare services.

State of Western Australia

- Alfred Eric Sandover, MC. For services to commerce and industry.

=== Order of the Bath ===
==== Knight Grand Cross of the Order of the Bath (GCB) ====
Military Division

Royal Navy

- Admiral Sir Desmond Parry Dreyer, KCB, CBE, DSC.

Army

- General Sir Charles Richardson, KCB, CBE, DSO (40407), late Corps of Royal Engineers, Colonel Commandant, Corps of Royal Engineers.

Royal Air Force

- Air Chief Marshal Sir John Grandy, KCB, KBE, DSO.

==== Knight Commander of the Order of the Bath (KCB) ====
Military Division

Royal Navy

- Vice-Admiral Peter John Hill-Norton, CB.
- Vice-Admiral Horace Rochfort Law, CB, OBE, DSC.

Army

- Major-General George Harris Lea, CB, DSO, MBE (58116), late Infantry, Colonel, The Lancashire Fusiliers.
- Lieutenant-General John Antony Jervis Read, CB, CBE, DSO, MC (62631), late Infantry, Colonel Commandant, Army Catering Corps.

Royal Air Force

- Acting Air Marshal Sidney Weetman Rochford Hughes, CB, CBE, AFC.
- Acting Air Marshal Melvin Kenneth Drowley Porter, CB, CBE.

Civil Division

- Douglas Albert Vivian Allen, CB, Permanent Under-Secretary of State, Department of Economic Affairs.
- David Bruce Pitblado, CB, CVO, Permanent Secretary, Ministry of Power.
- Sir Edward William Spencer Ford, KCVO, CB, Assistant Private Secretary to The Queen.

==== Companion of the Order of the Bath (CB) ====
Military Division

Royal Navy

- Rear-Admiral Geoffrey Harry Carew-Hunt.
- Rear-Admiral Peter Maxwell Compston.
- Major-General Ferris Nelson Grant.
- Rear-Admiral Cuthbert Francis Kemp.
- Rear-Admiral Andrew Mackenzie Lewis.
- Rear-Admiral Dennis Howard Mason.
- Rear-Admiral Thomas Heron Maxwell, DSC.
- Rear-Admiral Philip Graham Sharp, DSC.
- Rear-Admiral John Kingdon Watkins, OBE.

Army

- Major-General Cecil Hugh Blacker, OBE, MC (67083), late Royal Armoured Corps.
- Major-General Robert Straton Broke, OBE, MC (56154), late Royal Regiment of Artillery (now retired).
- Major-General James Merricks Lewis Gavin, CBE (52617), late Corps of Royal Engineers.
- Major-General Arundell Rea Leakey, DSO, MC (67210), late Royal Armoured Corps.
- Major-General Henry Lowther Ewart Clark Leask, DSO, OBE (62419), late Infantry, Colonel, The Royal Highland Fusiliers (Princess Margaret's Own Glasgow and Ayrshire Regiment).
- Major-General John Noel Thomas, DSO, MC (65504), late Corps of Royal Engineers.
- Major-General George Robert Turner Cain, CBE, DSO (50884), late Infantry.
- Major-General Thomas Norman Samuel Wheeler, CBE (66180), late Infantry.

Royal Air Force

- Air Vice-Marshal John Frederick Roberts, CBE.
- Air Vice-Marshal Henry Neil George Wheeler, CBE, DSO, DFC, AFC.
- Acting Air Vice-Marshal Robert Deacon Elliott, OBE, DFC.
- Air Commodore Alfred Henry Wynne Ball, DSO, DFC.
- Air Commodore William Jack Maggs, OBE.
- Air Commodore Adam Muir, MB, ChB.

Civil Division

- Derek Fortrose Allen, Under-Secretary, Board of Trade.
- James Craig Baird, lately Permanent Secretary, Ministry of Agriculture for Northern Ireland.
- George Raymond Bell, Third Secretary, HM Treasury.
- Ronald Brain, Deputy Secretary, Ministry of Housing and Local Government.
- Frank George Griffith Carr, CBE, Director, National Maritime Museum.
- William George Downey, Under-Secretary, Ministry of Aviation.
- Douglas Emery, Under-Secretary, Ministry of Health.
- Brigadier Claude Cyril Fairweather, CBE, TD, JP, DL, Chairman, Territorial and Auxiliary Forces Association for the North Riding of Yorkshire.
- Ronald James Guppy, Assistant Under-Secretary of State, Home Office.
- Henry William Walter Huxham, CBE, Solicitor, Ministry of Labour.
- Kenneth Newis, MVO, Under-Secretary, Ministry of Public Building and Works.
- John Reid, MRCVS, Chief Veterinary Officer, Ministry of Agriculture, Fisheries and Food.
- Eric William Shepherd, Director of Finance and Accounts, General Post Office.
- Frederick George James Sherwin, Chief Inspector, Board of Customs and Excise.
- Donald William Smithers, Director of Dockyards, Ministry of Defence (Royal Navy).

=== Order of Saint Michael and Saint George ===
==== Knight Grand Cross of the Order of St Michael and St George (GCMG) ====
Diplomatic Service and Overseas List

- Sir John Guthrie Ward, KCMG, lately Her Majesty's Ambassador Extraordinary and Plenipotentiary at Rome.

==== Knight Commander of the Order of St Michael and St George (KCMG) ====
- Alexander Kirkland Cairncross, CMG, Head of the Government Economic Service.

Diplomatic Service And Overseas List

- William Barker, CMG, OBE, Her Majesty's Ambassador Extraordinary and Plenipotentiary at Prague.
- John Edward Chadwick, CMG, Minister (Commercial), Her Majesty's Embassy, Washington.
- Arthur Norman Galsworthy, CMG, Deputy Under-Secretary of State, Commonwealth Office.
- Leslie Charles Glass, CMG, Her Majesty's Ambassador Extraordinary and Plenipotentiary at Bucharest.
- George Peter Hampshire, CMG, British High Commissioner, Port of Spain.
- John Ogilvy Rennie, CMG, Deputy Under-Secretary of State, Foreign Office.

==== Companion of the Order of St Michael and St George (CMG) ====
- Evelyn Elizabeth Patricia Bark, OBE, lately Director, International Affairs Department, National Headquarters, British Red Cross Society.
- James Arthur Kinnear Brown, MD, MB, ChB. For services to the treatment of Leprosy.
- Ronald Sigismund Shepherd Dickinson, United Kingdom representative on the Council of the International Civil Aviation Organization.
- Edward Allan Morris, OBE, Assistant Crown Agent for Oversea Governments and Administrations.
- Owen Humphrey Morris, Assistant Secretary, lately Ministry of Overseas Development (now Ministry of Housing and Local Government).
- Arthur Barrington Powell, Assistant Secretary, Ministry of Power.

Diplomatic Service and Overseas List

- George David Anderson, British Deputy High Commissioner, Colombo.
- Walter Fancourt Bell, Counsellor, British High Commission, Nairobi.
- James Eric Cable, Counsellor, Her Majesty's Embassy, Beirut.
- Eric Edmund Raitt Church, CBE, Controller, Finance Division, British Council.
- Denis Mackrow Cleary, Commonwealth Office.
- Bernard Robert Curson, Commonwealth Office.
- Denzil Inglis Dunnett, OBE, Counsellor (Commercial), Her Majesty's Embassy, Madrid.
- Harry Frank Brien Fane, OBE, lately Counsellor (Labour), Her Majesty's Embassy, Washington.
- Rafael Aloysius Fonseca, OBE, Financial Secretary, British Honduras.
- John Archibald Ford, MC, Counsellor (Commercial), Her Majesty's Embassy, Rome.
- John Stephen Gandee, OBE, British High Commissioner, Gaberones.
- Basil Jack Greenhill, lately Commonwealth Office.
- Donald James Dundas Maitland, OBE, Foreign Office.
- Peter John Ellison Male, MC, lately Counsellor (Commercial), Her Majesty's Embassy, Oslo.
- Martin John Marshall, Counsellor (Commercial), Commercial Section of British High Commission at Sydney.
- Francis William Marten, MC, British Deputy High Commissioner, Kuching.
- Robert Wilson Munro, lately Counsellor (Commercial), Her Majesty's Embassy, Khartoum.
- Keith Robertson Oakeshott, Her Majesty's Consul-General, Hamburg.
- Albert Russell Garness Prosser, MBE, lately Adviser on Community Development, Kenya.
- Alan Keir Rothnie, Counsellor (Commercial), Her Majesty's Embassy, Moscow.
- Fireebairn Liddon Simpson, Permanent Secretary, Premier's Office, Mauritius.
- Gerald Gordon Simpson, Her Majesty's Consul-General, Houston.
- Frank Stallwood, OBE, Foreign Office.
- Teng Pin-hui, MB, BS, JP, Director of Medical and Health Services, Hong Kong.
- Ian Buchanan Watt, British High Commissioner, Maseru.
- Kenneth Michael Wilford, lately Counsellor, Office of the British Chargé d'Affaires, Peking.
- Alec Michael John Wright, Director of Public Works, Hong Kong.

State of Victoria

- Albert Edward Chadwick, Chairman of the Gas and Fuel Corporation.

State of Queensland

- Alan Walter Campbell, OBE, of Brisbane. For services to the pastoral industry and the co-operative movement.

State of South Australia

- The Honourable Lindsay Gordon Riches, Speaker of the House of Assembly.

State of Tasmania

- Professor Keith Sydney Isles, Vice-Chancellor of the University of Tasmania.

=== Royal Victorian Order ===
==== Knight Grand Cross of the Royal Victorian Order (GCVO) ====
- The Very Reverend Charles Laing Warr, KCVO, DD.

==== Dame Commander of the Royal Victorian Order (DCVO) ====
- Anstice Rosa Gibbs, CBE.

==== Knight Commander of the Royal Victorian Order (KCVO) ====
- Major-General Sir Allan Henry Shafto Adair, Bt., CB, CVO, DSO, MC.

==== Commander of the Royal Victorian Order (CVO) ====
- Thomas Brockie.
- Group Captain Peter Erskine Vaughan-Fowler, DSO, DFC, AFC, Royal Air Force.
- Agnes Barbara Holland, MVO.
- Commander Evan William Jones, MVO, Metropolitan Police.
- Major William Thomas Roe, ED.

==== Member of the Royal Victorian Order, 4th class (MVO) ====
- Captain Markham Henry Evelegh, Royal Navy (Retired).
- Sidney Charles Hutchison.
- Lieutenant-Commander Ronald McLean, Royal Navy.
- David Mercer Gorman Newburn, MBE.
- Surgeon Captain Anthony O'Connor, MB, BS, Royal Navy.
- Peter Alfred Wright, MVO.

==== Member of the Royal Victorian Order, 5th class (MVO) ====
- Herbert Albert Barry.
- Kathleen Margaret Louise Bruce.
- Lawrence Stanley Davis.
- Lieutenant-Commander John Merryn Atkinson Fairbank, Royal Navy (Retired).
- Superintendent Ernest William Francis, Norfolk Constabulary.
- Christopher Robert Hopper.
- Flight Lieutenant Ralph Matthew Lee, DFC (1395880), Royal Air Force.
- John Robert Harold Millman.
- Dolores Malita de Rohan Monreal, MBE.
- Gordon Sears.
- Police Inspector Derek Norman Sharp, Commonwealth of Australia Police Force.
- Gillian Adair Swinburn.

==== Medal of the Royal Victorian Order (RVM) ====
- L0535085 Chief Technician Leslie Jack Bloom, Royal Air Force.
- Police Constable John Irving Dodd, Metropolitan Police.
- G1920822 Flight Sergeant Desmond Sidney Franks, Royal Air Force.
- Ralph Frederick Glenister.
- Frederick Meredith.
- Leslie Shedwell Mutton.
- Ernest George Onslow.
- Chief Petty Officer Cook (O) Kenneth George Peers, P/MX 862895.
- Edward Francis Redrup.
- Harry Robbins.
- Leonard Rutt.
- William Thomson.
- George Turner.
- John Turner.
- Hilda Ward.
- Yeoman Bed Hanger George Henry Willmott, MBE, TD, Her Majesty's Bodyguard of the Yeomen of the Guard.

=== Order of the British Empire ===
==== Knight Grand Cross of the Order of the British Empire (GBE) ====
Civil Division

- Leslie Kenneth O'Brien, Governor of the Bank of England.

==== Dame Commander of the Order of the British Empire (DBE) ====
Civil Division

- Margaret Rutherford, OBE (Margaret Taylor Davis), Actress.
- Albertine Louise Winner, OBE, MD, FRCP, Deputy Chief Medical Officer, Ministry of Health.

==== Knight Commander of the Order of the British Empire (KBE) ====
Military Division

- Vice-Admiral Charles Peter Graham Walker, CB, DSC, Royal Navy.
- Lieutenant-General Ian Cecil Harris, CB, CBE, DSO (47584), late Infantry, Colonel, The Royal Ulster Rifles.
- Major-General John Edward Francis Willoughby, CB, CBE (58173), late Infantry.
- Air Marshal William Edward Coles, CB, CBE, DSO, DFC, AFC, Royal Air Force.

Civil Division

- Alexander Richard Glen, CBE, DSC, Chairman, Export Council for Europe. For services to Export.
- Colonel Tom Fielden Hood, CB, OBE, TD, Chairman, Territorial and Auxiliary Forces Association for the County of Gloucester.
- Sir Charles Hector Fitzroy Maclean, Bt., Chief Scout of the Commonwealth.
- Sir Edward James Reid, Bt., OBE, Chairman, Accepting Houses Committee.
- Professor Max Leonard Rosenheim, CBE, MD, FRCP, President, Royal College of Physicians.

Diplomatic Service and Overseas List

- James Currie, CMG, OBE, Her Majesty's Consul-General, Johannesburg.
- Sir John Osbaldiston Field, CMG, Governor and Commander-in-Chief, St. Helena.
- James McDonald, CBE, British Consul, Portland.
- Raymond Horace Smith, CBE, British subject resident in Venezuela.

State of New South Wales

- The Honourable John Sydney James Clancy, CMG, Chancellor of the University of New South Wales.

==== Commander of the Order of the British Empire (CBE) ====
Military Division

Royal Navy

- Commodore Griffith Owain Wyn Evans, DSC, Royal Fleet Auxiliary Service.
- Captain Thomas Patrick Gillespie, MBE.
- Captain Peter George La Niece.
- Surgeon Captain Bernard Sutton Lewis, DSC, MRCS, LRCP (now Retired).
- Captain Hardress Llewellyn Lloyd, DSC (now Retired).
- Captain John Charles Young Roxburgh, DSO, DSC.
- Captain Horace Gerald Southwood, DSC.

Army

- Colonel Geoffrey Thompson Anderson, OBE, MC (56988), late Infantry (now retired).
- Colonel Harry Benson Ansell, TD (164479), Staff, Territorial Army.
- Colonel Phyllis Grant Bennett, RRC (206058), Queen Alexandra's Royal Army Nursing Corps (now retired).
- Brigadier Cedric George Buttenshaw, DSO, OBE (50818), late Royal Regiment of Artillery.
- Colonel Clifford Mayhew Dodkins, DSO, OBE (380533), late Royal Armoured Corps (now retired).
- Colonel Rolland Padraig Stewart Erskine-Tulloch (77665), late Infantry.
- Brigadier (paid acting) Arthur John Hardy, MBE (86396), late Infantry, formerly Commander, Kenya Army and British Army Training Team, Kenya.
- Colonel William Charles Stuart Harrison, ERD (228020), late Corps of Royal Engineers, Army Emergency Reserve.
- Brigadier Eric Frank Kyte, OBE (66044), late Corps of Royal Engineers.
- Brigadier Frank Harrington Lowman, DSO, MBE, ADC (53650), late Corps of Royal Engineers.
- Brigadier (paid acting) Rollo Edward Cruwys Price, DSO (67130), late Infantry.
- Brigadier Harry Christopher Pulley, OBE, MC (380627), late Infantry.
- Colonel Anthony Arthur Keith Rugge-Price (63560), late Royal Armoured Corps (now retired).
- Brigadier (paid acting) Charles Gordon Talbot Viner, MC, TD (94529), late Infantry, formerly Commander, Federal Regular Army, Aden.
- Colonel Dennis Walton, OBE, MC, TD (179964), Staff, Territorial Army.

Royal Air Force

- Air Commodore Michael James Beetham, DFC, AFC.
- Air Commodore John Goodman.
- Air Commodore Charles Norman Seton Pringle.
- Acting Air Commodore John Thornett Lawrence, OBE, AFC.
- Group Captain Hedley Charles Davies Blasbery, OBE.
- Group Captain Ronald Noel Hamilton Courtney, DFC, AFC.
- Group Captain Alan Cyril Davies.
- Group Captain David George Evans, OBE.
- Group Captain John Thomas Lowe.
- Group Captain William Samuel Oliver Randle, OBE, AFC, DFM.
- Group Captain David Cecil Hugh Simmons, AFC.

Civil Division

- James Ballantyne Allan, OBE, TD, DL, Civil Defence Group Controller, Edinburgh.
- James Douglas Alston, JP, Member, Agricultural Research Council.
- Bernard Percy Alton, MVO, Joint Secretary, Newspaper Proprietors Association.
- Milicent Jessie Eleanor Bagot, MBE, attached Ministry of Defence.
- George Thomas Thalben-Ball, Organist, the Temple Church.
- Godfrey Lewis Barber, Assistant Secretary, Ministry of Housing and Local Government.
- Lieutenant-Colonel The Honourable Ralph Edward Blackett Beaumont, TD, JP. For public services in Wales.
- The Right Reverend Stanley Woodley Betts. Lately Bishop to HM Forces.
- David Blyth Bogle, Chairman, Scottish Committee, Council on Tribunals.
- Harry Briggs, Employee Relations Adviser to the Board of Unilever Ltd.
- Edward Louis Britton, General Secretary, Association of Teachers in Technical Institutions.
- Thomas Broad, Assistant Chief Valuer, Board of Inland Revenue.
- James Burns, GM, Chairman, Northern Gas Board.
- Wilfred Burns, City Planning Officer, Newcastle upon Tyne.
- John Greer Calvert, General Manager, Northern Ireland Housing Trust.
- Thomas Ivor Casswell, Senior Land Registrar, Lord Chancellor's Department.
- William Miller Seddon Cawley, Chief Engineer, Officer of the Receiver for the Metropolitan Police District.
- Ralph Chiles, Deputy Chairman, Prince-Smith and Stells Ltd. For services to Export.
- Ralph Harry Arthur Chisholm, County Treasurer, Cheshire.
- Gerald Edward Coke. For services to Music.
- Ralph Cox, Director of Army Contracts, Ministry of Defence (Army).
- William Craib, Chief Inspector, Department of Agriculture and Fisheries for Scotland.
- Peter Lauderdale Daubeny, OBE. For services to the Theatre.
- Roy Dicker Salter Davies, HM Chief Inspector of Schools, Department of Education and Science.
- John Priestman Doncaster, Keeper of the Department of Entomology, British Museum (Natural History).
- Pauline Dower, OBE, lately Deputy Chairman, National Parks Commission.
- Gerard Francis Mary Egan, Vice-President, Federation of Civil Engineering Contractors.
- Harold William Elliott, Managing Director, Pickfords Ltd.
- George Charles English, Assistant Secretary, Board of Customs and Excise.
- Arthur Charles Evans, Secretary, Joint Central Committee, Police Federation of England and Wales.
- Robert Young Fison, Joint Managing Director, Meredith and Drew Ltd. For services to Export.
- Denis Follows, MBE, Secretary, Football Association.
- Cyril Theodore Forsyth, JP. For services to Education in Nottingham.
- Alderman Kimberley George Foster, JP, Chairman, Cornwall County Council.
- Anna Freud. For services to Psycho-Analysis.
- Donald Frederick Galloway, Director of Research, Production Engineering Research Association of Great Britain.
- Frank Matthias Gardner. For services to Librarianship.
- Roberto Juan Rene Gerhard, Composer.
- Alexander Drummond Gibson, Musical Director and Principal Conductor, Scottish National Orchestra.
- Hugh Gillies, Convener, Dunbartonshire County Council.
- John Gary Gilson, OBE, MB, FRCP, Director, Medical Research Council's Pneumoconiosis Research Unit.
- Derek Harding Glover, MBE, Financial Director, British Overseas Airways Corporation.
- David Goodfellow. For services to the National Farmers' Union of Scotland.
- Strathearn Gordon, OBE, Librarian, House of Commons.
- Edward Basil Green, Chairman, Doulton and Company Ltd. For services to Export.
- Vincent Llewellyn Griffiths, OBE. For services to Education in developing countries.
- Catherine Mary Hall, General Secretary, Royal College of Nursing.
- Stanley William Hayter, OBE, Artist and Engraver.
- Reginald Hobbins, Principal Executive Officer, Ministry of Social Security.
- Laurence James Holloway, Director, Holloway Brothers (London) Ltd.
- James Frederick Holman, Chairman and Joint Managing Director, Holman Brothers Ltd. For services to Export.
- Graham Llewellyn Hopkin, OBE, Assistant Director, Weapons Group, United Kingdom Atomic Energy Authority, Aldermaston.
- Edward Maxwell Howard. For services to Agriculture in the counties of Derby, Lincoln and Nottingham.
- Kenneth Edwin Hyatt, Site Agent, Associated Bridge Builders Ltd.
- Herbert Noel Jerman, Assistant Secretary, Welsh Office.
- Arthur Walwyn John, OBE, Member, National Coal Board.
- Ceridwen Eiluned Beard Jones, Headmistress, Windsor Street County Primary School, Liverpool.
- David Jones. For services to Youth Charities.
- John Blythe Kinross, OBE, Deputy Chairman, Industrial and Commercial Finance Corporation Ltd.
- Hugh John Klare, Secretary, The Howard League for Penal Reform.
- Professor Heinz Koeppler, OBE, Warden, Wilton Park Centre, Foreign Office.
- Charles Louis Lawton, OBE, Chief Actuary, York County Savings Bank.
- Tom Stewart Lodge, Statistical Adviser and Director of Research, Home Office.
- Isidore Jack Lyons. For services to Industry and the Arts.
- Brian Fraser Macdona. For services to Anglo-African relations.
- Gordon McLachlan, Secretary, Nuffield Provincial Hospitals Trust.
- John Struthers McNeil, Chief Road Engineer, Scottish Development Department.
- Alfred Edward McVie, JP, Alderman, Barnsley County Borough Council.
- John Mount Montague Meyer. For services to Anglo-Russian trade.
- Arthur Leslie Miller, Chairman, Wolsey Ltd. For services to Export.
- Alderman Evan Thomas Kinsey Morgan. For social and local government services in mid-Wales.
- Cecil Denis Morley, Secretary, Stock Exchange Council.
- Terence Raymund Newman, Assistant Secretary, Ministry of Transport.
- Thomas Wallace Parker, lately Deputy Director, Building Research Station, Ministry of Technology.
- Joseph Buford Pennybacker, MD, FRCS, Director, Department of Neurological Surgery, Radcliffe Infirmary, Oxford.
- Denis Sydney Player, Chairman, Newall Machine Tool Company Ltd. For services to Export.
- Ronald Hector Prince, Assistant Secretary, Ministry of Defence (Royal Air Force).
- Ernest Edward Pullee, Principal, Leicester College of Art.
- Robert William Pye, Deputy Chief Scientific Officer, Royal Aircraft Establishment, Ministry of Aviation.
- Samuel Alfred Roberts, Chairman, B.S.A. Tools Group of Companies. For services to productivity in Birmingham.
- Thomas Ferguson Rodger, FRCP (Glas.), Professor of Psychological Medicine, University of Glasgow.
- Phyllis May Rossiter, Assistant Secretary, HM Treasury.
- George Singleton, JP. For services to the Arts in Scotland.
- Alderman Ellen Violet Smith, JP, Member, and lately Chairman, Birmingham Education Committee.
- Enid Mary Starkie, Reader Emeritus in French Literature, University of Oxford.
- Richard Renyard Strachan, Chief Superintendent Engineer, New Zealand Shipping Company Ltd.
- Walter Strachan, Managing Director, Bristol Aerojet Ltd. For services to Export.
- Colonel Leonard Tetley, TD, Chairman, Territorial and Auxiliary Forces Association for the County of Buckingham.
- Colonel Charles Newbigging Thomson, DSO, OBE, TD, DL, Chairman, Territorial and Auxiliary Forces Association for the County of Angus and the City of Dundee.
- Stanley Tiffany. For local government services in Wakefield and District.
- Dorothy Tutin, Actress.
- Leslie William Stokes Upton, MBE, JP, lately Registrar of the Judicial Committee of the Privy Council.
- Ernest Gillett Whitaker, Chairman, Central Transport Consultative Committee.
- Eric Frederick Wilkins, Chief Commoner, City of London.
- John Wilson, MBE, Chief Constable, Lanarkshire Constabulary.
- Edgar Barton Worthington, Scientific Director, International Biological Programme.

Diplomatic Service and Overseas List

- Brian Boyd Butterworth, lately Assistant Postmaster-General (Engineering), East African Common Services Organisation.
- Cochrane Highet Campbell, British subject resident in India.
- Mervyn William Dennison, MC, QC, lately Puisne Judge of the High Court of Zambia.
- Charles Edward Dymond, lately Counsellor (Commercial), British High Commission, Lagos.
- Vincent Edward Frederick Eyre, OBE, lately Resident Adviser and British Agent, Mukalla.
- Angus Macleod Ferguson, Senior Partner, Irving and Bonnar, Attorneys of Lagos.
- Terence Garrett, lately Counsellor (Scientific), Her Majesty's Embassy, Moscow.
- John Frederick Greaves, OBE, British subject resident in Belgium.
- James Snelson Hardman, OBE, Adviser to Indian Tea Association, Assam.
- Leslie William Hayes, OBE, lately Vice-Director, International Radio Consultative Committee, International Telecommunication Union.
- Henry Thomas Hopkinson, lately Director for Africa of the International Press Institute.
- Eric William Lawrance, Director of Lands and Surveys, Sarawak, Malaysia.
- John Lee, State Financial Officer, Brunei.
- Ian Vaudin Gordon Mackay, MBE, lately Director of Audit, Nigeria.
- Alastair George Mackenzie, MC, British subject resident in Singapore.
- Archibald Robert Kerr Mackenzie, Her Majesty's Consul-General, Zagreb.
- Donald Bruce McKinney. For public services in the Bahamas.
- John Graham Morley, Grade 4 Officer, Her Majesty's Diplomatic Service, lately Her Majesty's Embassy, Saigon.
- Joseph Maurice Paturau, DFC. For public services in Mauritius.
- Bruce Aubrey Reeves, DSC, lately Director of Lands and Surveys, Malaysia.
- Charles Edward De Salis, MBE, lately Grade 4 Officer, Her Majesty's Diplomatic Service, Her Majesty's Embassy, Rio de Janeiro.
- John Frederick Saunders, MBE, Counsellor (Commercial), British High Commission, Colombo.
- Ronald Aubrey Savage, Deputy General Manager (Engineering), National Electricity Board, Malaysia.
- Anthony Leslie Cranage Thorne, formerly Director of Veterinary Research, Nigeria.
- John Rupert Hunt Thouron, British subject resident in the United States of America.
- Robert Hugh Winder, MBE, lately Commandant, Bahrain State Police.
- Charles Francis Seton De Winton, OBE, British Council Representative, France.
- Arthur Wooller, British Deputy High Commissioner, Bombay.
- Cyril DaCosta Gittens, OBE, lately Auditor General, Barbados.

State of New South Wales

- Alexander Morven Dan, MB, BS. For services to the community.
- Raymond Edgar Purves. For services to community organisations.
- Alistair Hugh Urquhart, Chairman of the Sydney Stock Exchange.

State of Victoria

- The Honourable Thomas Henry Grigg, MLC, JP, of Maldon. For public and community services.

State of Queensland

- Harold George Fielding, of Brisbane. For public and community welfare services.
- John Hardie Lavery, Professor of Civil Engineering, University of Queensland.

State of Western Australia

- Professor Gordon Stephenson, Dean of the Faculty of Architecture, University of Western Australia.

State of Tasmania

- Trevor Claude James, OBE, MB, BS, lately Commissioner of the St. John Ambulance Brigade.
- Edward Ernest O'Farrell, MVO, Official Secretary to the Governor of Tasmania.

==== Officer of the Order of the British Empire (OBE) ====
Military Division

Royal Navy

- Lieutenant Commander John Keith Arbuthnot.
- Lieutenant Commander Edwin Alan Baldwin.
- Commander Gerald Lewis Coates.
- Lieutenant Commander Anthony Oliver Gaunt.
- Surgeon Commander Peter Warren Head, MB, BS.
- Major (Acting Lieutenant Colonel) Geoffrey Howe, VRD, Royal Marines Reserve.
- Commander William Francis Harold Lama-Craft.
- Commander Michael Chamney Lawder.
- The Reverend Raymond John Lowe, QHC.
- Commander Jeremy Nash, DSC.
- Commander Herbert Hamilton Ridler.
- Major David Ninis Slater, Royal Marines.
- Commander Eric Gascoyne Stearns.
- Commander Geoffrey Arthur Gay Williams.

Army

- Lieutenant-Colonel (paid acting) John Leslie Stuart Andrews (273204), Royal Regiment of Artillery.
- Lieutenant-Colonel Basil Spencer Beddall, MC (242798), Corps of Royal Engineers.
- Lieutenant-Colonel Robin Victor Mackenzie Benn (138116), Royal Army Educational Corps.
- Lieutenant-Colonel Thomas Roy Birkett (325740), The Prince of Wales's Own Regiment of Yorkshire.
- Lieutenant-Colonel (local) Thomas Nigel Bromage, MBE (354991), Grenadier Guards.
- Lieutenant-Colonel James Barnard Buckmaster (153963), Corps of Royal Military Police.
- Lieutenant-Colonel (acting) Leslie Alexander George Creal (340796), Army Cadet Force.
- Lieutenant-Colonel William John Wallis Crossby (236025), Corps of Royal Engineers, British Joint Services Training Team, Ghana.
- The Reverend Peter Alured Ettrick, TD (244122), Chaplain to the Forces, Second Class, Royal Army Chaplains' Department, Territorial Army (now retired).
- Lieutenant-Colonel (paid acting) John Charles Field (148212), Royal Regiment of Artillery.
- Lieutenant-Colonel Archibald Ian Douglas Fletcher (293471), Scots Guards.
- Lieutenant-Colonel Donald Murray Fletcher, MC (253718), The Parachute Regiment (Employed List 1), formerly Royal Brunei Malay Regiment.
- Lieutenant-Colonel John David Carew Graham (243024), The Parachute Regiment.
- Colonel John Gunn, MC, TD (184625), Staff, Territorial Army.
- Lieutenant-Colonel Richard Noel Harrison (256164), Royal Regiment of Artillery.
- Lieutenant-Colonel John Frederick Hill, TD (179053), Corps of Royal Engineers, Territorial Army.
- Lieutenant-Colonel Roy Frederick Humphrey, TD (35318), Army Cadet Force (now retired).
- Lieutenant-Colonel (Staff Quartermaster) Geoffrey Jones, MBE (211503), Corps of Royal Engineers (Employed List 2) (now retired).
- Lieutenant-Colonel Gerald Desmond Michael Landy (337664), Royal Army Ordnance Corps, British Army Training Team, Kenya.
- Lieutenant-Colonel (acting) Arthur John Lennox (310462), Army Cadet Force.
- Lieutenant-Colonel John Ronald Long (240341), Royal Corps of Signals, Territorial Army (now T.A.R.O.).
- Lieutenant-Colonel (Quartermaster) George Lynam (414687), Royal Corps of Signals.
- Colonel William Stewart Young Mackie, LDS (270805), late Royal Army Dental Corps.
- Lieutenant-Colonel John Stuart McLaren (126981), The Somerset and Cornwall Light Infantry (Employed List 1), formerly on loan to the Government of Malaysia.
- Lieutenant-Colonel Percy Arthur Norman, ERD (98581), Corps of Royal Engineers, Army Emergency Reserve.
- Lieutenant-Colonel Gordon Peat (219810), Royal Corps of Signals.
- Lieutenant-Colonel Gordon Colin Randolph Lithgow Pender, MBE (289086), The Royal Highland Fusiliers (Princess Margaret's Own Glasgow and Ayrshire Regiment).
- Lieutenant-Colonel Philip Douglas Turner Powell, TD (341885), The Royal Hampshire Regiment, Territorial Army.
- Lieutenant-Colonel and Staff Paymaster Eric Oliver Prothero (132182), Royal Army Pay Corps, formerly on loan to the Zambia Army.
- Lieutenant-Colonel Derrick Brian Pullen, TD (153153), The Queen's Royal Surrey Regiment, Territorial Army.
- Lieutenant-Colonel Gilbert Rous Saltonstall (182362), The King's Own Yorkshire Light Infantry.
- Lieutenant-Colonel Arthur Tamerlane Scott (328217), Royal Corps of Signals.
- Lieutenant-Colonel Philip Blencowe Tillard (232564), 13th/18th Royal Hussars (Queen Mary's Own), Royal Armoured Corps.
- Lieutenant-Colonel Cyril Charles Tobenhouse, MBE (360033), Royal Army Ordnance Corps.

Overseas Awards

- Colonel Henrique Alberto de Barros Botelho, MBE, ED, The Hong Kong Regiment, The Volunteers.

Royal Air Force

- Wing Commander James Stewart Wallace Bell, AFC (164601).
- Wing Commander Bertrand Brownlow, AFC (3110111).
- Wing Commander Robert George Cecil Castell (47182).
- Wing Commander George Percy Elliott, DFC (130622).
- Wing Commander Jack Ford (51447).
- Wing Commander John Raymond Charles Henry Graves (64946).
- Wing Commander John Alfred Henshaw (146457).
- Wing Commander John William Hume (49445).
- Wing Commander William James Marriott (166208). For services while on loan to the Government of Pakistan.
- Wing Commander Harold Mundy (56385).
- Wing Commander Christopher Roger Gartside Neville (180180).
- Wing Commander Stanley George Nunn, DFC (81935).
- Wing Commander David McLagan Scrimgeour (3038967).
- Wing Commander Peter John Stevens, MB, ChB (501433).
- Wing Commander William Wilkinson (51626).
- Acting Wing Commander John Worsley Thomas (120795), Royal Air Force Volunteer Reserve (Training Branch).
- Squadron Leader George Philip Black, AFC (3130226).
- Squadron Leader Harold Clive Jamieson, MBE (502941).
- Squadron Leader Eric John Elrick Smith (607610).

Civil Division

- William Russell Abernethy, MB, BCh, Medical Officer of Health, Londonderry County Borough.
- Joseph Allan. For services to the Royal Air Forces Association.
- Elizabeth Carnegy-Arbuthnott, Home Help Organiser, London Borough of Camden.
- Andrew Archibald, Chairman, Perth Trustee Savings Bank.
- Francis Thomas Bacon, Consultant, Energy Conversion Ltd.
- Frank Malcolm Baldwin, MBE. Secretary-General, Yorkshire Agricultural Society.
- Robert Smillie Barclay, MD, FRCS, Consultant Thoracic and Cardiac Surgeon, Western Regional Hospital Board, Scotland.
- John William Barnett, Chief Constable, Lincolnshire Constabulary.
- Sylvia Irina Barnett. Honorary Secretary, Branches, Membership, Hostels Standing and Fund Raising Committees, Victoria League for Commonwealth Friendship.
- Edgar Alfred Bartlett, lately County Agricultural Adviser, West Sussex, National Agricultural Advisory Service, Ministry of Agriculture, Fisheries and Food.
- Albert George Beck, National Secretary, Commercial Services Group, Transport and General Workers' Union.
- William George Erin Beckmann, Chief Welfare Officer, HM Diplomatic Service.
- Walter Andrew Biggar, MC. Farmer. For services to Agriculture in Scotland.
- John Hiram Blount, Headmaster, Rayners School, Penn, Buckinghamshire.
- William Bolton, Principal Scientific Officer, Agricultural Research Council Poultry Research Centre, Edinburgh.
- Harry Muirfield Braid, Chairman, John Walker and Sons Ltd. For services to Export.
- Lieutenant-Colonel William Norman Brann, ERD, Chairman, Northern Ireland War Pensions Committee.
- John James Brennan, Grade 2 Officer, Ministry of Labour.
- Henry Brown, Chief Inspector, Cumberland North and East Branch, Royal Society for the Prevention of Cruelty to Animals.
- Henry Thomas Cadbury-Brown, TD. Architect.
- William Christopher Brown, Chief Assistant, Freeman, Fox and Partners, Consulting Engineers.
- Arthur Frederick Bulgin, MBE. Chairman and Managing Director, A. F. Bulgin and Company Ltd.
- Doris Bullock. Headmistress, Gaywood Park Secondary Girls' School, King's Lynn.
- John Carruthers, JP, Chairman, Board of Management for Stirling and Clackmannan Hospitals.
- David Dore Carver, General Secretary, International P.E.N.
- Alderman Owen George Collins. Chairman, Harrow Savings Committee.
- John Edward Comben, Principal Inspector, Board of Inland Revenue.
- Ayleen Finlay Conway, MBE. Head of After-Care and Prison Welfare Department, Women's Royal Voluntary Service.
- William Cousin, Principal, Kirkcaldy Technical College, Fife.
- Alderman Robert Sands Crossfield, Chairman, Westmorland County Council.
- Daniel Crowley, lately Chief Executive Officer, Ministry of Defence (Royal Navy).
- Thomas Crozier, MBE. County Inspector, Royal Ulster Constabulary.
- Ena Daniels. Chairman, Professional and Technical Staffs Group A, Whitley Council for Health Services.
- Alfred Bentley Davies, MB, ChB. General Medical Practitioner, Walsall.
- Colonel Arthur Edward Davis, MBE, TD. For services to ex-servicemen in Wales.
- James Kilpatrick Davis, Chief Clerk of the Chancery Division and Registrar in Lunacy, Supreme Court of Judicature, Northern Ireland.
- Maxwell Robert Vincent Daviss, Engineer, Upper Tame Main Drainage Authority.
- Frank Dalmeny Dawtry, MBE, General Secretary, National Association of Probation Officers.
- Olivia Devonald, Honorary Secretary and Honorary Organiser, Widnes Cancer Research Fund.
- Robert Hugh Dewar, FRCS.Ed, LDS, General Medical Practitioner, Berwick-on-Tweed.
- Nakdimon Shabbethay Doniach, Senior Departmental Specialist, Government Communications Headquarters.
- Wallace Burns Douglas, JP. For services to the Institute of Clerks of Works of Great Britain Incorporated.
- Reginald James Dutton. For local government services in Hampshire.
- Donald Frederick Edwards, Chairman, Newcastle upon Tyne and District Advisory Committee.
- Michael Vincent Edwards, lately Assistant Conservator, Forestry Commission for Scotland.
- Frank Reginald Farmer, Head, Safeguards Division, Authority Health and Safety Branch, United Kingdom Atomic Energy Authority, Risley.
- Cecil Henry James Farthing, Investigator 1, Royal Commission on Historical Monuments (England).
- Roger Foster, Managing Director, M. & F. O. Foster and Company Ltd.
- Leonard John Fowler, Deputy Chairman and Managing Director, Weatherfoil Heating Systems.
- Alderman John Henry Franklin, Chairman, Grimsby Education Committee.
- Frank John Frost, Senior Land Agent, Oxford, Ministry of Defence (Army).
- Robert Petrie Gammie, MD, DRCOG, lately General Medical Practitioner, Bishop's Stortford.
- Dorothy Ellen Marion Gardner, Reader in Child Development Department, Institute of Education, University of London.
- Gordon Willie Garland, MD, MB, Member, South-West Metropolitan Regional Hospital Board.
- William Miller Gillespie, lately Chief Fatstock Officer, Ministry of Agriculture, Fisheries and Food.
- Robert Bayne Simpson Gilmour, County Road Surveyor and Engineer, Kirkcudbright County Council.
- Leslie John Glanfield, Deputy Regional Director, Home Counties Region, General Post Office.
- Roy Acton Glasson, lately Managing Director, Johnsons Ethical Plastics Ltd.
- Lieutenant-Commander Sidney Edward Glover, MBE, DSC, Staff Superintendent, House of Lords.
- John Basil Goode, Senior Principal Scientific Officer, Royal Armament Research and Development Establishment, Ministry of Defence (Army).
- Leonard Samuel Gross, Principal, Board of Customs and Excise.
- Joan Edith Hain, Chairman, West Cornwall Hospital Management Committee.
- Hubert Clifford Hampton, Immediate Past President, Institute of Housing Managers.
- Alderman Sydney Hand, Chairman, Traffic Committee, Leeds City Council.
- John Arthur Harrison, Editor, Coventry Evening Telegraph.
- Wilfred Harry Hathaway, Headmaster, Spon Lane Secondary School, West Bromwich.
- John Hayhurst, Alderman, Carlisle City Council.
- James Henderson, lately Academic Registrar, University of London.
- Captain James Morrison Henderson, Chief Marine Superintendent, J. & J. Denholm (Management) Ltd.
- Henry Franceys Porter Herdman, Director, Research Vessel Management Unit, Natural Environment Research Council, Plymouth.
- Roderick Hardy Hield, Chairman and Managing Director (Joint), Hield Brothers Ltd. For services to Export.
- Frank Hill, Chief Executive, Wool, Jute and Flax Industry Training Board.
- Robert Boothby Hoff, Chief Supplies and Contracts Officer, British Railways Board.
- Frederick Hopkins. For services to the welfare of old people and to youth in Battersea.
- Lewis George Foskett Horrell, Chairman, Devon Agricultural Executive Committee.
- Frank Howe, HM Inspector of Schools, Department of Education and Science.
- Captain Jack Wilmot Howgego. Marine Superintendent, General Steam Navigation Company Ltd.
- Cyril Leonard Hudson. Sales Manager (London), Simons-Lobnitz Ltd. For services to Export.
- Lieutenant-Colonel Charles Francis Hutchinson, DSO, DL. Secretary, Territorial and Auxiliary Forces Association for the County of Durham.
- Joe Illingworth. Journalist, The Yorkshire Post.
- Albert Horace Ireson. Assistant Director of Contracts, Ministry of Public Building and Works.
- Robert Arthur Smith Jamieson. Superintending Quantity Surveyor, Ministry of Public Building and Works.
- Gladys Mary Jay, JP. Alderman, London Borough of Enfield.
- David Jenner. Chief Executive Officer, Ministry of Social Security.
- William John Jepson. General Secretary, Confederation of Health Service Employees.
- Peter George Shore Johnson, MB, BS. General Medical Practitioner, Romsey.
- Samuel Johnson. Commercial Director, Daniel Doncaster and Sons Ltd.
- Thomas Rowley Jones. Alderman, Breconshire County Council.
- Alfred Maxwell Keeling, TD, Electrical Engineer, Ministry of Defence (Royal Navy).
- James Kegie. County Planning Officer, Monmouthshire.
- Joseph Sylvester Kelly, Alderman, Bootle Borough Council.
- Laurence Ernest Kieran. Higher Waterguard Superintendent, Board of Customs and Excise.
- Richard Henry Kirby. Assistant Director, Tropical Products Institute, Ministry of Overseas Development.
- Leah Lean Kitchingham, MBE. Director, Far East Department, British Council.
- Alec Kravis. Manager, Administrative and Technical Services Research Division, The Marconi Company Ltd.
- John Harold Lees. Senior Principal Scientific Officer, Ministry of Defence.
- James Andrew William Thomas Lewis. Chairman, Operatives Panel of Civil Engineering Construction Conciliation Board.
- Nelson Valdemar Linklater. Deputy Drama Director, Arts Council of Great Britain.
- Ernest Karl Litthauer. Export Sales Director, B.K.L. Alloys Ltd. For services to Export.
- William Lomax. Lately Principal, Doncaster Technical College.
- James McCormick, JP. Chairman, County Down Education Committee.
- Andrew McKenzie. Chief Executive Officer, Scottish Home and Health Department.
- Thomas Clyde McKenzie, TD, JP, DL, MB, ChB, Chairman, Smethwick Disablement Advisory Committee.
- Henry Wallace McMullan. Head of Northern Ireland Programmes, British Broadcasting Corporation.
- Frederic Allan Valentine Madden. Lately Headmaster, Royal Russell School, Addington, Surrey.
- Denis George Withers Malone, lately HM Prison Service.
- Joseph Angus Marshall. Principal Signals Officer, Diplomatic Wireless Service.
- John Edmund Leopold Martel, Conseiller in the States of Guernsey.
- Wing Commander Richard Frewen Martin, DFC, AFC. Lately Test Pilot, Hawker Siddeley Aviation Ltd.
- Hamish Masson. Administrative Secretary, Legal Aid Central Committee for Scotland.
- Ronald Cavill Mathias, MBE. Regional Secretary, South Wales, Transport and General Workers' Union.
- Robert Fredrick Moore. Captain, England Association Football World Cup Team.
- Samuel Morgan, MBE, National Savings District Member for West Glamorgan.
- John Blair Hood Morton. HM Inspector of Factories, Class IA, Ministry of Labour.
- Albert Davis Munrow. For services to sport and physical recreation.
- Clarence Henry Nicholas, Headmaster, Heolgam County Secondary School, Glamorgan.
- Robert Nimmo, Chief Superintendent Engineer, Currie Line Ltd.
- James Terence O'Brien, General Secretary, Ulster Farmers' Union.
- Major David Glyn-Owen, TD. For services to the British Schools Exploring Society.
- Arthur John Palmer, Secretary, National Small Bore Rifle Association.
- William Park, Keeper of Manuscripts, National Library of Scotland.
- Freda Parry (Frederica Mabel Parry-Dunmore), Founder and Conductor, The Freda Parry Choir, Southend.
- William Bryce Paton, County Librarian, Lanarkshire.
- Leslie Richard Pears, MBE, TD, For services to the Boy Scouts Association.
- Alderman Raymond Courtney Penhale. For services to local government and to old people in Lancashire.
- Richard Franklin Pescod, HM Senior District Inspector of Mines and Quarries, Ministry of Power.
- John Edward Pheysey, MC, Chairman, Worcestershire Agricultural Executive Committee.
- Alderman Annie Philpot, JP. For social services in Peterborough.
- Elsie Pigott, Director, Cambridgeshire and Isle of Ely Branch, British Red Cross Society.
- Stanley Frederick James Pilgrim, Chief Executive Officer, Ministry of Social Security.
- Janet Mary Poole, MBE, lately Chairman, Bradford, Shipley and District War Pensions Committee.
- Alderman Edith Enid Porter, Member, Worcestershire County Council Health Committee.
- Richard John Pounce, Senior Research Officer, Board of Trade.
- Tudor Howell Price, Managing Director, Unigate Ltd.
- Robert William Pringle, Chairman and Managing Director, Nuclear Enterprises (G.B.) Ltd.
- Lionel Ernest Prosser, Director of Research, British Hydromechanics Research Association.
- David Forsyth Rae, Regional Controller, Southern Region, Ministry of Social Security.
- David Redman, Principal Executive Officer, Ministry of Aviation.
- John Urquhart Reid, Chief Executive Officer, HM Treasury.
- James Richard, MB, ChB, General Medical Practitioner, Stranraer.
- George Richards, JP, Chairman, Glamorgan Agricultural Executive Committee.
- Noel Melville Richards, MBE, Head of Photographic and Reproduction Branch, Ministry of Defence (Royal Air Force).
- Francis Robinson, JP, Member, Executive Committee, National Union of Agricultural Workers.
- Winston Malcolm Rodgers, lately Head of Industrial Operations Unit, Ministry of Technology.
- Eric Olding Rose, Chief Engineer, Eastern Gas Board.
- Sydney Rose. For services to school sports.
- George Ambrose Rowse, Senior Dental Officer, Ministry of Health.
- Alderman Derrick Aylmer Frederick Henry Howard Hartley Russell, TD, Chairman, Civil Defence Committee, Berkshire County Council.
- Walter Phipps Sawtell, Director, Invertere Coat Company, Ltd. For services to Export.
- Louis Sherman, JP, Alderman, London Borough of Hackney.
- Jack Gilbert Skinner, lately Headmaster, St. John's Royal Air Force School, Episkopi, Cyprus.
- James Coulter Smyth, FFD, MRCS. For services to Dentistry in Northern Ireland.
- Muriel Sarah Spark, Writer.
- Leonard Alfred Speller, An Assistant Secretary, Church Commissioners.
- Kenneth Welter Lawrence Steele, Chief Constable, Somerset Constabulary.
- Richard Charles Steele, Secretary, School Broadcasting Council, British Broadcasting Corporation.
- William Stewart, London Editor, Northcliffe Newspapers Group, Ltd.
- William John Stewart, Principal Officer, Ministry of Development for Northern Ireland.
- Robert Hunter Taylor, lately Contractor's Site Agent, Tay Road Bridge.
- Frederick James Tector, Consultant to Managing Director, Stone Manganese Marine Ltd.
- Charles Vivian Thornley, Town Clerk, Burnley.
- John Boston Tilley, MD, Medical Officer of Health, Northumberland County Council.
- John Charles Timms, Regional Commissioner, North Western Region, National Savings Committee.
- John Tobin, Musical Director, London Choral Society.
- Robert Wilson Todd, Director, Export Group for the Constructional Industries. For services to Export.
- Ian Colton Trafford. For services to Export, particularly in connection with the Trade Fair in Moscow.
- William Unsworth, Area General Manager, No. 7 Area, East Midlands Division, National Coal Board.
- William Henry Valentine, Chairman, Medical Laboratory Technicians Board.
- William David Verrall, Principal Clerk, Chancery Chambers, Royal Courts of Justice.
- Richard Edward Wagg, TD, Honorary Treasurer, London Federation of Boys' Clubs.
- Archibald Howitt Warren, MBE, Chief Officer, Cheshire Fire Brigade.
- Herbert Francis Watson, Chairman, Friendly Societies Liaison Committee.
- Horace Stanmore Welch. Lately Chairman, Smethwick Advisory Committee on Justices of the Peace.
- Samuel Welch, lately Assistant Staff Engineer, Telephone Exchange Systems Development Branch, General Post Office.
- Stirling Martin Whorlow, Secretary, Royal National Life-Boat Institution.
- Frank Henry James Wileman, Secretary-General, The Corporation of Secretaries.
- George William Wilkins, JP, Alderman, Walsall Borough Council.
- Griffith Llewelyn Williams, JP, Alderman, Anglesey County Council.
- Walter Thomas Pettit Williams, lately Superintendent, Royal Ordnance Factory, Cardiff, Ministry of Aviation.
- Arthur Henry Wilson, Chief Examiner of Engineers, Board of Trade.
- James Wilson, MBE, Chief Driving Examiner, Ministry of Transport.
- Frederick William Winslade, JP. For services to local government in Lewisham and Camberwell.
- William Giles Worthington, Treasurer, Liverpool Regional Hospital Board.
- Mary Lavinia Bessie Young. Lately Matron, Westminster Group of Hospitals.
- Philip Cecil Zealey, Secretary, Voluntary Societies Committee on Service Overseas.

Diplomatic Service and Overseas List

- Anthony Clayton Ashworth, Information Adviser to British High Commissioner, Aden.
- Leonard Clayton Beadle, lately Professor of Zoology, Makerere University, Kampala, Uganda.
- Henry Hamilton Beamish, lately Adviser to the Minister of Information, Laos.
- Russell Horotho Vincent Belizaire. For public services in St. Lucia.
- Donald Sneath Benton, Principal Executive Engineer, Eastern Nigeria.
- Cecil Valentine Bethel, Headmaster, Government High School, Bahamas.
- Beatrix Blanche Briant, British subject lately resident in the Sudan.
- Gerard William Brigden, lately Chief Architect/Adviser, Capital Development Authority, Pakistan.
- Eric Broadbent, Principal Establishment Officer, Swaziland.
- Anthony Graham Brown, MB, BS, Deputy-Director in Saigon of Province Medical Aid, United States Agency for International Development.
- Desmond Lingard Bruen, lately Permanent Secretary, Ministry of Communications and Works, Sarawak, Malaysia.
- Cheng Tung-choy, JP, For services to the cause of education in Hong Kong.
- John Alexander Cochrane, MRCS, LRCP, Medical Officer Grade A, Gibraltar.
- Wilhelm Cohn, Senior Legal Assistant, Her Majesty's Embassy, Bonn.
- Thomson Reid Cowell, Administrative Officer Class I, Commissioner, South Pacific Office, Fiji.
- Eric Ralph Davies, FRCS.Eng., British subject resident in India.
- Sydney George Davis, Professor of Geography, University of Hong Kong.
- Eric Charles Stewart Dawe, Principal, Veterinary Training Institute, Uganda.
- William John Richard Geoffrey Patrick Dawson, lately Head of British Interests Section of the Canadian High Commission, Dar es Salaam.
- Peter Robert Vincent Deed, British Council Representative, Malta.
- Leslie Arthur William Diamond, lately Managing Director, Broadcasting Company of Northern Nigeria.
- Lieutenant-Colonel Hugh Docherty, lately Commercial Secretary, Her Majesty's Embassy, Vientiane.
- Alan Gregory Elgar, lately Chargé d'Affaires, Her Majesty's Embassy, Port-au-Prince.
- James Norrie Ellis, MBE, Deputy Adviser and British Agent, Eastern Aden Protectorate.
- Geoffrey James Ellison, British subject resident in Venezuela.
- Peter Ronald Ells, Financial Secretary, Montserrat.
- Donald Thomas Rees Elsmore, Organiser of Agricultural Training, Northern Nigeria.
- William Marnoch Emslie, British Council Regional Representative, Kaduna.
- Ewart William Francis, President of the Senate, British Honduras.
- John Edward Freeman, Planning and Development Officer, Education Service, Northern Nigeria.
- Victor Harry Gale, MBE, Chairman of the Farmers' Marketing Board, Malawi.
- Robert Geddes Gibson, British subject resident in the Sudan.
- Leslie Charles Gleadell, JP, Colonial Treasurer Falkland Islands.
- George Reuben Goodall, Chief Engineer (Generation), National Electricity Board, Malaysia.
- William Hurford Hagley, MBE. For public services in Grenada.
- Norman Maddeford Hallett, lately Her Majesty's Consul, Kansas City.
- Robert Laurence Harvey, Manager, The Deraodera Estate Group, Ceylon.
- Thomas Ellis Hatton, MBE, Assistant Commissioner of Police, Malaysia.
- James Noel Anthony Hobbs, British subject resident in India.
- Stanley Ernest Hodgson, Regional Representative, British Council, South India.
- Geoffrey Norman Hutchinson, British Consul, Barranquilla.
- William Thomas Joseph, MB, Obstetrics Officer, Holberton Hospital, Antigua.
- Arthur Cranmer Kenrick, British Consul, Valparaiso.
- Ralph Malcolm MacDonald King, Legal Draftsman, Northern Nigeria.
- Eric Creswell Kitson, First Secretary (Commercial), Her Majesty's Embassy, Manila.
- Arthur Wilfred Lawson Lake, MBE, MD, CM, Surgical Specialist, Cunningham Hospital, St. Christopher-Nevis-Anguilla.
- James Bale Lamb, British subject resident in Austria.
- Enoch Light, lately Chief Magistrate, Aden.
- Ian Gilmour McCulloch, Permanent Secretary, Ministry of Labour, Malawi.
- John Henry Macdonell, British subject resident in the United States of America.
- William Aubrey Manuel, MBE, Colonial Postmaster, Bermuda.
- David Anthony Marks, Director of Publicity for "Britain 66" Trade Fair, Oslo.
- Forrest Loudon Megson, British subject resident in Kenya.
- Sydney Miller, JP. For public services in the Falkland Islands.
- Joseph Reynold O'Neal, MBE, JP. For voluntary public services in the Virgin Islands.
- William Edwin Parker, British subject lately resident in Chile.
- Roland Charles Peagram, MBE, Deputy Permanent Secretary, Uganda.
- Louis Edouard Pierre Piat. For public services in Mauritius.
- Patrick Henry Towers-Picton, First Secretary, Her Majesty's Embassy, Helsinki.
- Denis Reginald Roper, MVO, lately Her Majesty's Consul, Minneapolis.
- Arnold Edwin Rose, FRCS Eng, FICS, Chief Medical Officer and Senior Surgeon, Cyprus Mines Corporation.
- Charles Henry Rowe, British subject resident in Uganda.
- William Sharpe, Her Majesty's Consul (Commercial), Milan.
- Leslie Claude Shore, lately Deputy Secretary, Government of West Pakistan.
- William John Simons, Regional Director, British Council, Frankfurt-On-Main.
- Colin James Cumming Smith, MB, FRCS Ed., Surgical Specialist, General Hospital, Kuching, Sarawak, Malaysia.
- John Elmer Stevens, lately Assistant Chief Engineer (Administration), East African Railways and Harbours.
- Anthony John Maxwell Stevenson, MRCS, LRCP, Principal Medical Officer, Mid-Western Nigeria.
- George Stewart, Manager, Chartered Bank, Kuching, Sarawak.
- Hans Francis Stierer, MBE, lately Assistant Head of External Department, British Military Government, Berlin.
- Raymond Lewis Sturge, Commissioner for Co-operative Development and Marketing, Aden.
- Gordon Ewart Charles Trounce, lately Counsellor (Labour), British High Commission, New Delhi.
- Augusto Francisco Velho, British subject resident in Bolivia.
- Hermine Dorothea Caroline De Vivenot, First Secretary (Information), Her Majesty's Embassy, The Hague.
- Commander Robert Duncan Wall, Royal Navy (Retired), lately Head of Information Section, British High Commission, Kingston.
- David Anthony Wehl, Regional Information Officer, British Government Office, Quebec City.
- George Russell Wheeler, MM, lately Secretary, National Electricity Board, Malaysia.
- Bernard Herbert Wilcox, Her Majesty's Consul (Commercial), Los Angeles.
- David Oswald Marchant Williams, MBE, First Secretary and Cultural Attaché, Her Majesty's Embassy, Bucharest.
- Wilfred Wong Sien-bing. For public and social services in Hong Kong.
- Percivale Cardross Grant, MBE, District Commissioner, Gaberones, Bechuanaland.
- Noel Vernon Redman, Permanent Secretary, Ministry of Agriculture, Bechuanaland.
- Chief Samuel Seepheephe Matete. For public services in Basutoland.
- Norman Napo Raditapole, Permanent Secretary, Ministry of Agriculture, Co operatives and Marketing, Basutoland.
- Victor Wallace Austin Chase. For public services in Barbados.

State of New South Wales

- William McKie Barbour, MB, ChM, President of the Gunning Shire Council.
- Edwin Sydney Bishop, New South Wales Parliamentary Draftsman.
- Francis Patrick Clune. For services to literature.
- Jean Mary Daly. For services to the community, particularly to the welfare of women.
- Lincoln Carruthers Hynes. For services to the welfare of the community.
- John Robert Somers. For services to primary industry.

State of Victoria

- The Reverend Christopher Thomas Frow Goy, lately Presbyterian Minister of Ewing Memorial Church.
- John Brisbane Harper, Honorary Secretary to the Council of Legal Education.
- George Lauder McCowan, of North Balwyn. For services to community welfare organisations.
- Ainslie William Walker, President of the Surf Life Saving Association of Victoria.
- The Reverend Alfred Harold Wood, lately Principal of Methodist Ladies' College, Kew.

State of Queensland

- James Charles Butler, of Townsville. For services to the community, particularly to crippled children.
- The Reverend Brother John Stanislaus Campbell, of Brisbane. For services to education.
- Jean Mary Geddes, of Brisbane. For services in the interests of youth welfare.
- Henry Emmanuel Roberts, Headmaster of the Church of England Grammar School, Brisbane.

State of Western Australia

- William Lane Brine. For services to the building profession.
- George Henry Jennings, JP, of Kalgoorlie. For services to the goldmining industry.
- Noel John Cowley McCombe, lately Town Clerk of Fremantle.

State of Tasmania

- Maxwell George Cleaver, of Launceston. For services to the community for many years.
- Arthur James Harvey, JP, of Cygnet. For services to the community and local government.

==== Member of the Order of the British Empire (MBE) ====
Military Division

Royal Navy

- Captain (Local Major) Jeffrey Charles Beadle, MC, Royal Marines.
- Instructor Lieutenant Commander Sydney Gregory Clark.
- Lieutenant Commander Geoffrey Arthur Stephen Cowley.
- Supply Lieutenant Commander (CK) William John Dawkins (now Retired).
- Engineer Sub-Lieutenant (A/E) William George Edward Daysh.
- Lieutenant Commander Lawrence Lamb, DSM (on loan to the Royal Malaysian Navy).
- Lieutenant Commander Henry Charles Paul Lesser, Royal Malaysian Navy.
- Lieutenant Commander (SCC) Phillip Jonathan Morgan, Royal Naval Reserve.
- Lieutenant Commander (SD)(G) Ronald Will Paige (now Retired).
- Lieutenant Commander Robert James Reading.
- Lieutenant Commander (SD)(TAS) John William Runnacles.
- Lieutenant Commander (SD)(O) Thomas Edward Joseph St Vaughan.
- Second Officer Kathleen Stewart, Women's Royal Naval Reserve.
- Electrical Sub-Lieutenant (AR) Bernard Alan Taft.
- Lieutenant Commander John Michael Wade (now Retired).
- Lieutenant Commander Sydney Alfred Warner, DSC.

Army

- Major and Paymaster Charles Adams (292944), Royal Army Pay Corps.
- Major (Q.G.O.) Balbahadur Tamang, MVO, MM (398048), 10th Princess Mary's Own Gurkha Rifles.
- Major Kenneth Winston Battson (352320), The Royal Welch Fusiliers.
- Major Derek Ronald Bishop (393075), The Queen's Regiment.
- Captain (acting) George Ivan Blow (290907), Combined Cadet Force (now retired).
- 14418837 Warrant Officer Class II Peter George Boot, Royal Regiment of Artillery.
- Major (T.O.T.) Stanley Alfred Bristow (409045), Royal Corps of Signals (now retired).
- Major James Moreland Campbell, TD (296689), Corps of Royal Engineers, Territorial Army.
- Captain Edna Cansick (402365), Women's Royal Army Corps, Territorial Army.
- Captain Stanley William Carrier (353852), Corps of Royal Military Police.
- Captain Peter Desmond Ernest Chase (437033), Royal Corps of Signals, on loan to the Government of Malaysia.
- Major (acting) Henry Mark Clayton (137282), Army Cadet Force.
- Captain (Quartermaster) John Thomas Herbert Cooper (464894), The York and Lancaster Regiment.
- Major John Napier Cormack (393107), Corps of Royal Engineers.
- 22209661 Warrant Officer Class II David John Costine, Royal Corps of Transport, Army Emergency Reserve.
- Major Raymond Frederick Newell Eke, DFC (292502), Corps of Royal Engineers.
- Major William Dudley Graham Fairholme (341499), The Royal Anglian Regiment.
- Captain (Quartermaster) Sydney Thomas Felton (455730), Grenadier Guards.
- Major (Quartermaster) Robert Frame, TD (313704), Royal Army Medical Corps, Territorial Army.
- Major Thomas Alexander Gibson (380091), The Duke of Edinburgh's Royal Regiment (Berkshire and Wiltshire).
- Major Richard Glazebrook (421959), The Prince of Wales's Own Regiment of Yorkshire, Federal Regular Army, Aden.
- W/383053 Warrant Officer Class II Margaret Henderson Ross Brown Hay Grant, Women's Royal Army Corps.
- 843042 Warrant Officer Class I (acting) George Gravestock, Corps of Royal Electrical and Mechanical Engineers.
- 14474163 Warrant Officer Class II David Gilbert Grove, The Royal Anglian Regiment.
- Major Harold James Hammon (281063), Royal Pioneer Corps.
- Major Roger Newman Harris (397272), Royal Corps of Transport.
- Major Margaret Danskin Hogarth, TD (415321), Women's Royal Army Corps, Territorial Army.
- 22809241 Warrant Officer Class I (Bandmaster) John Hugh Hughes, Royal Regiment of Artillery, Territorial Army.
- Major (Master-at-Arms) Victor Stephen Hugo (452761), Army Physical Training Corps.
- Major Eric Ernest Hunt (403497), 13th/18th Royal Hussars (Queen Mary's Own), Royal Armoured Corps.
- Major Robert Michael Hutton (364705), Corps of Royal Engineers.
- Major Ernest Alfred Henry Jeffcoat (358066), The Queen's Regiment.
- 14449061 Warrant Officer Class I Gareth Jones, Royal Army Ordnance Corps.
- 22848205 Warrant Officer Class II Leonard Kilby, Royal Corps of Transport, Territorial Army.
- 22358478 Warrant Officer Class II John Victor Kirk, Royal Army Ordnance Corps.
- 22266061 Warrant Officer Class II Arthur Walter Knight, The Herefordshire Light Infantry, Territorial Army.
- Lieutenant Kenneth Daniel Lewis (479775), Welsh Guards.
- Major (acting) John McKean McAdam (264031), Army Cadet Force.
- 6298688 Warrant Officer Class II Leonard Albert Meakings, Intelligence Corps.
- Captain Lawrence Wilkinson Moran (462745), Royal Corps of Signals.
- Major Brendan Peter Vincent O'Duffy, MB (453255), Royal Army Medical Corps, British Army Training Team, Kenya.
- Major David Nial Creagh O'Morchoe (393236), The Royal Irish Fusiliers (Princess Victoria's).
- Major Frederick Joseph Plaskett (376103), Royal Corps of Transport.
- Captain John Francis Rickett (461643), Welsh Guards.
- Captain (Quartermaster) Anthony Dennis Russell (473172), The Royal Anglian Regiment.
- Major Charles Arthur Robert Shipp, TD (243338), Royal Regiment of Artillery, Territorial Army.
- 10570611 Warrant Officer Class I Bernard Arnold Smith, Royal Army Ordnance Corps (now retired).
- 22518438 Warrant Officer Class I Frank Albert Smith, Royal Regiment of Artillery.
- Major (Quartermaster) Frederick Joseph Storer (453386), Royal Regiment of Artillery.
- 22962327 Warrant Officer Class I (Bandmaster) Alexander Sidney Swain, The Leeds Rifles (P.W.O.), Territorial Army.
- Major Edgar Patrick Wylie Tatford, MB (429598), Royal Army Medical Corps, Territorial Army.
- 7670108 Warrant Officer Class II Alec Thompson, Royal Army Pay Corps.
- Major (Assistant Paymaster) Donald Perkin Tibbey (366369), Royal Army Pay Corps.
- Major (Quartermaster) Charles James Alexander Vass (431267), Queen's Own Highlanders (Seaforth and Camerons).
- 22568953 Warrant Officer Class II George Walker, Corps of Royal Engineers, Territorial Army.
- 21187120 Warrant Officer Class II Henry Webster, Royal Army Ordnance Corps.
- Major Duncan Buller West, TD (193620), Royal Regiment of Artillery, Territorial Army.
- Major (Quartermaster) Reginald Bernard Wilkinson (435362), The Gordon Highlanders.
- 22809158 Warrant Officer Class I Benjamin George Wood, Royal Regiment of Artillery, Territorial Army.
- 556612 Warrant Officer Class II Henry Thomas Woods, The Royal Wiltshire Yeomanry, Royal Armoured Corps, Territorial Army.

Overseas Awards

- Warrant Officer Class II Isoa Vakaciwa, Fiji Infantry Regiment.
- Major Leonard Cameron Banfield, ED, The Barbados Regiment.

Royal Air Force

- Squadron Leader Joseph Michael Anthony Baker (755046).
- Squadron Leader Alan Breakes (582067).
- Squadron Leader Basil Richmond Browne (150387). For services with the British Joint Services Training Team, Ghana.
- Squadron Leader Charles Bruce (53921).
- Squadron Leader John Barry Duxbury (4135575).
- Squadron Leader Charles James Haldane Fox (575015).
- Squadron Leader Colin Arthur Grennan (502890).
- Squadron Leader Don Grisbrook (502820).
- The Reverend Henry Rayner Mackintosh Harries (506019).
- Squadron Leader Michael George Shakeshaft Hobbs (2484743).
- Squadron Leader Peter Hague Jones (203458).
- Squadron Leader Brian James Lemon, AFC (2608281).
- Squadron Leader (Acting Wing Commander) Gregory Middlebrook (58569).
- Squadron Leader Jaromir Mocek (134343).
- Squadron Leader John Edward Nevill (607627).
- Squadron Leader Trevor Roy Perry (571422).
- Squadron Leader Charles Edward Ruff (550954).
- Squadron Leader Thomas Humphrey Sheppard (607451).
- Squadron Leader Cyril John Trevains (3035366).
- Squadron Leader James William Wood (178078).
- Squadron Leader Ian Matheson Young (412360).
- Acting Squadron Leader Geoffrey David Hardy (567588). For services with the British Joint Services Training Team, Ghana.
- Acting Squadron Leader Michael David Wright (500164).
- Flight Lieutenant John William Betts (1397859).
- Flight Lieutenant Reginald Arthur Victor Cocker (505838), (Retired).
- Flight Lieutenant Harry Bramwell Davies (112675), (Retired).
- Flight Lieutenant Graham George Flack (5010809), Royal Air Force Regiment.
- Flight Lieutenant Fergus John Hayden (4063837).
- Flight Lieutenant Eric Ivor Ross Jordan, BEM (575520). For services while on loan to the Kenya Air Force.
- Flight Lieutenant Dennis Norton (547639).
- Flight Lieutenant Brian Anthony Owens (3039529).
- Flight Lieutenant Leslie Owens Oxley (591055).
- Flight Lieutenant Dennis Bernard Desmond Rhodes (569601).
- Flight Lieutenant Hugh Fraser Waterworth (506936).
- Flight Lieutenant Malcolm Morrison Young (579410).
- Acting Flight Lieutenant William Frederick Hayman (1920746).
- Acting Flight Lieutenant Frederick William White (63574), Royal Air Force Volunteer Reserve (Training Branch).
- Flying Officer Arthur John Frederick Stagg (585050).
- Warrant Officer Albert William Ball (M0515682).
- Warrant Officer Benjamin Rossall Platt (J0531635).
- Warrant Officer Arthur Scoon (A0530792).
- Warrant Officer Ronald David Stephens, BEM (L0565961).
- Warrant Officer Ivor George Tattershaw (E0571986).
- Warrant Officer Arthur Bernard Westmancott (S0910230).

Civil Division

- Robert Gibbons Allsop, Vice-Chairman, Southwark War Pensions Committee.
- James Reginald Ambrose, Station Superintendent, Brunswick Wharf Power Station, Central Electricity Generating Board.
- Agnes Anderson, Matron, Robroyston Hospital, Glasgow.
- Dorothy Emily Anderson. For social services in Ellesmere Port, Cheshire.
- Annie May Andrew, Nursing Sister, Plymouth General Hospital.
- Jack Edward Andrew, Chief Officer, Bury Fire Brigade.
- John Angus, Inspector, Board of Inland Revenue.
- Dorothy May Appleby, lately Infants Teacher, Nettlebed County Primary School, Oxfordshire.
- Eileen Alice Armstrong, Supervisor in Charge of Production, Airborne Industries Ltd.
- Anthony Charles Azzopardi, Civilian Officer, Civilian Establishment and Pay Office, Malta, Ministry of Defence (Army).
- Arthur Walter Bailey, Head of Economic and Statistical Department, British Electrical and Allied Manufacturers' Association.
- William Doran Barclay, Chief Draughtsman, Electrical Drawing Office (Ships), Harland and Wolff Ltd.
- Margaret Hawthorne Barnes, Regional One-in-Five Organiser, Tunbridge Wells, Women's Royal Voluntary Service.
- William Hartley Barnes. For services to ex-servicemen in Lancashire.
- James Baum, JP, Alderman, St. Albans City Council.
- Samuel Beaufoy, Head of Engineering Department and Vice-Principal, Ipswich Civic College.
- David Proctor Bee, Senior Civil Engineering Architectural and Surveying Assistant, Department of Agriculture and Fisheries for Scotland.
- Sydney Herbert Benson, Director-Secretary, Calderpark Zoo, Glasgow.
- Victor Reginald Bevan, Judge's Clerk, Lord Chancellor's Department.
- Frederick Edward Philip Bollom, Higher Executive Officer, Ministry of Social Security.
- Geoffrey Herbert Booty, European Liaison Officer, British Broadcasting Corporation.
- Lieutenant-Colonel George Borwick, MC, TD, Chairman, Nairn County Savings Committee.
- Gladys Maude Bott, lately Assistant Secretary, National Association of Colliery Managers.
- Leslie Percival Botting, Area Commissioner, Northern Area, Hampshire, St. John Ambulance Brigade.
- John Herbert Bowker, National Savings District Member for East Sussex.
- Major Albert Thomas Bowler, Retired Officer II, Ministry of Defence (Army).
- William Charles Bradbrooke, Honorary Secretary, Stockport Savings Committee.
- Theodore Bradford, Senior Collector, Board of Inland Revenue.
- Thomas Bradley, BEM, Factory Manager, Post Office Factory, Cwmcarn, Newport, Monmouthshire.
- Eirlys Brittain, Branch Nursing Superintendent, Montgomeryshire Branch, British Red Cross Society.
- Constance Brown. For voluntary life saving services in Jersey.
- Fanny Susannah Brown, Honorary Secretary and Treasurer, Tunbridge Wells Branch, Dr. Barnardo's Helpers' League.
- Horatio Frederick Brown, Export Sales Manager, Bowater-Scott Corporation Ltd. For services to Export.
- James Ayton Craig Brown, Executive Officer, Ministry of Defence (Army).
- John Marshall Bryson, lately Chief Clerk, 7th Battalion, The Argyll and Sutherland Highlanders (Territorial Army).
- Prudence Margaret Emirah Bunnett, District Nurse and Health Visitor, West Riding of Yorkshire County Council.
- Albert Frederick Burrows, Headmaster, Coldean County Primary School, Brighton.
- Thomas Marius Joseph Butler, Detective Chief Superintendent, Metropolitan Police.
- Irene Amelia Buzzel, Grade 7 Officer, HM Diplomatic Service.
- Edward Cain. For social services in County Durham.
- Eric James Camp, Chief Pharmacist, HM Prison, Liverpool.
- Henrietta Blanche Gwendoline Campbell, lately Teacher of Embroidery, Winchester School of Art.
- Edith Maude Cason, BEM, Regional Officer, North Eastern Region, Women's Royal Voluntary Service.
- Harold William Chapman, Executive Officer, Ministry of Transport.
- Thomas Clark, Chief Superintendent and Deputy Chief Constable, City of Dundee Police.
- Winifred Ruby Clarke, Executive Officer, Ministry of Housing and Local Government.
- Herbert John Clifford, National Savings District Member for South Warwickshire.
- Ena Cocker, Senior Executive Officer, Ministry of Social Security.
- William Arnold Cooling, Director, Northern Trawlers Ltd, Grimsby.
- Dorothy Cosgrove. For services to the Jewish community in the West of Scotland.
- John Cecil Curry, Manager, Public Address Hire Department, Standard Telephones and Cables Ltd.
- Eric Cussans, Works Manager, Vickers Instruments Ltd.
- Barbara Mary Daniel, Assistant Secretary, Building Societies Association.
- Mervyn Lewis Daniels, Group Secretary, Brentwood Group Hospital Management Committee.
- John Howard Davies, Music Librarian, British Broadcasting Corporation.
- Lynn Davies. For services to Athletics.
- Margaret Mary Davies, Headmistress, Fairwater Junior School, Cardiff.
- Hilda May Davis, Honorary Secretary, Beeston and Stapleford Savings Committee.
- Joan Davison, Administrative Assistant, Royal Institution of Chartered Surveyors.
- Harry Day, Grade 4 Officer, Ministry of Labour.
- Dorothy May Dixon, Chairman, Edmonton Hospitals League of Friends.
- Henry Mark Doherty, Senior Foreman, Electrical Branch, Ministry of Defence (Royal Navy).
- Stanley Joseph Dorey, Senior Investigation Officer, Board of Customs and Excise.
- Ralph Duckworth, Surveyor, Board of Customs and Excise.
- Ursula Vernon Eason, Assistant Head of Family Programmes, Television, British Broadcasting Corporation.
- William Francis Edwards, General Manager, Port Talbot, Bridgend and Porthcawl Undertakings, Wales Gas Board.
- Alderman John Walter Eley, lately Member, Nottingham No. 4 Hospital Management Committee.
- Eliza Jane Ellacott, Matron, Kincraig, Devon, Old People's Home.
- Lucy Henrietta Ellis, Secretary, Lewisham Old People's Welfare Association.
- Mary Helen Ellis, Welfare Worker in the ports of Folkestone and Dover, Kent Council of Social Service.
- Olive Mary Elsom. For voluntary social work in Lincolnshire.
- Alec Thomas Elvy, Secretary, British Fashion Export Group. For services to Export.
- Anne Cecilia Emerson, Deputy Superintendent Health Visitor and School Nurse, Newcastle upon Tyne County Borough Council.
- Annie Gwynneth Evans, Executive Officer, Welsh Office.
- Graham Maurice Evans, Chief Inspector, English Electric Valve Company Ltd.
- Idris Evans, HM Inspector of Mines and Quarries, Ministry of Power.
- The Reverend Owen Robert Powell-Evans (Brother Owen). For services as Headmaster, St. Francis School for Maladjusted Boys, Hooke, Dorset.
- George Henry Eyles, Director of Tests, Institute of Advanced Motorists.
- Margaret Fairlie Fairlie, Higher Executive Officer, lately Colonial Office (now Ministry of Overseas Development).
- Samuel Farrant, Deputy Chairman, Berkshire Agricultural Executive Committee.
- Arthur John Douglas Feltham, Port Naval Auxiliary Officer, Royal Naval Auxiliary Service, Portland.
- Jean Lesley Finlay. For public services in County Fermanagh.
- Charles Alfred Lacey Fisher, Librarian, Bar Library, Royal Courts of Justice.
- James Forde, JP, Provost of Stevenston, Ayrshire.
- Enid Maud Lane Fox, Member, Nuffield Hospital Management Committee.
- Mary Bridget Fetherstonhaugh Frampton, Personal Assistant, House of Commons.
- Georgina Esther Helen Freeland, Higher Executive Officer, Board of Trade.
- Charles Henry Freeman, Superintendent, Admiralty Constabulary, Ministry of Defence (Royal Navy).
- Margaret Joan Freeman, Founder and Vice-Chairman, Deaf, Blind and Rubella Children's Association.
- William Gardiner, Higher Executive Officer, Ministry of Social Security.
- Alderman Oswald Garvin, Chairman of the Housing Committee, Hillingdon Borough Council.
- Gordon George Gates, Chief Superintendent, Home Office Police Research and Planning Branch.
- Austin Kieran Gibbons, Senior Executive Officer, Ministry of Social Security.
- Charles Gibson, Higher Executive Officer, Ministry of Defence (Army).
- Edward Victor Colder, Experimental Officer, Signals Research and Development Establishment, Ministry of Aviation.
- Victor Edwin Golds, Road Safety Officer, London Borough of Southwark.
- Michael Goldstein, General Secretary, Association for Jewish Youth.
- Charles Christopher Gomm, MC, Superintendent of Recruitment, London Transport Board.
- Harry Thomas Gordon, Executive Officer, Ministry of Defence (Army).
- Phyllis Mary Gordon, Manager, Balham Appliance Centre, Ministry of Health.
- Edward Dennis Greenwood, General Manager, South Eastern Trustee Savings Bank.
- Harry Lister Greenwood, Overseas Manager, Electro-Chemical Engineering Company, Ltd. For services to Export.
- Lillian Ellen Knight Gregson, lately Honorary Secretary, "G.W." Savings Group, Gerrards Cross.
- Eva Gubbins, Clerical Officer, Home Office.
- William Sturrock Guild, Supervisor, Civilian Trade Instructor, Ministry of Defence (Royal Navy).
- Anne Augusta Mary Gunn, Personal Secretary, National Savings Committee for Scotland.
- Eileen Mary Guppy, lately Senior Experimental Officer, Institute of Geological Sciences, Natural Environment Research Council, Department of Education and Science.
- George Patrick Guyatt, Manager, Export Department, United Yeast Company Ltd. For services to Export.
- Leslie Edward Hammond, Experimental Officer, Infestation Control Laboratory, Ministry of Agriculture, Fisheries and Food.
- Alan Hardie, Chief Contracts Engineer, Mott, Hay and Anderson.
- Samuel John Hardy, JP, Councillor, Castle Donington Rural District Council, Leicestershire.
- Harry Charles Harrison, Chief Purser, Empress of England, Canadian Pacific Steamships Ltd.
- Alderman Reginald Hartley, JP. For services to Local Government in Huddersfield.
- Sydney Hartley, Headmaster, Wybourn Junior and Infants School, Sheffield.
- William Hatton, Head of Department of Building and Engineering, Liverpool College of Building.
- Freda Wills Hawkins, Secretary, Council for Education in World Citizenship (Scotland).
- Harold Henderson, Head Postmaster, Minehead.
- Patrick Hickey, TD, MB, BS, Branch Medical Officer and Assistant Branch Director (Men), Durham Branch, British Red Cross Society.
- Horace Frederick Higgins, Senior Executive Officer, Ministry of Social Security.
- Ruth Victoria Royle-Higginson, JP, Councillor, Urmston Urban District Council, Lancashire.
- Henry Charles Hill, DFC, Managing Director, Howe and White Ltd.
- Wilfred Edgar Hill, Security Officer Grade II, Ministry of Aviation.
- Edith Hinde, County Organiser, Kent County Federation of Young Farmers' Clubs.
- Margaret Hine. For services to music in Westmorland.
- Rosemary Constance Hoare. For services to the Girl Guides Association.
- Stephen Hobson. For services to the Pottery Industry in North Staffordshire.
- Herbert Holloway, Site Manager, Neatishead, Electronics Group, Associated Electrical Industries Ltd.
- Florence Ellen Louise Hook, lately Supervisor, County Training Centres for the mentally subnormal, Hampshire.
- William McDonald Horne, Principal Nursing Officer, State Hospital, Carstairs, Lanarkshire.
- Herbert Houlder, Chairman, Halifax Industrial Sub-Committee, National Savings Committee.
- Ernest Hoyle, MM, JP, Chairman, Rochdale, Bacup and District War Pensions Committee.
- Donald Sydney Hughes, Inspector of Air Raid Warnings, Southern Sector, Air Raid Warning Organisation.
- Walter Coxon Ince, Assistant Executive Engineer, Test and Inspection Branch, General Post Office.
- Eva Ingham, lately Matron, Northern Ireland Fever Hospital.
- Lieutenant-Colonel George William Archibald Jackson, TD, Chairman, Supplementary Benefit Appeal Tribunal, Exeter.
- William Frank James, lately Chief Draughtsman, Ministry of Defence (Royal Navy).
- Donald Alan Jarvis, lately Examiner, Board of Trade.
- Patrick George Bernard Jarvis, Civil Defence Officer, West Riding of Yorkshire County Council.
- Joseph Oswald Jemitus, Chief Draughtsman, Cammell Laird and Company (Shipbuilders and Engineers) Ltd.
- Muriel Irene Jenkins, lately Grade 3 Officer, Ministry of Labour.
- Kathleen Thelma Jennings, Executive Officer, Cabinet Office.
- Olive Mary Jenvey, Executive Officer, HM Stationery Office.
- Elsie May Jones. For local services, particularly to the blind, in Wrexham.
- Lucy Jones, County Superintendent of District Nurses, Lancashire County Council.
- Margaret Lucy Jones, Voluntary worker for the welfare of Overseas Cadets.
- Charles Joyce, Senior Executive Officer, Ministry of Transport.
- Kenneth Archibald Kindon, Divisional Manager, Middlesbrough, British Railways Board.
- Edgar Harry Knight, Senior Experimental Officer, Animal Virus Research Institute, Pirbright, Surrey.
- Fred Knowles, Chief Telecommunications Superintendent, Liverpool, General Post Office.
- Jim Ladd, Councillor, Trowbridge Urban District Council, Wiltshire.
- Bertha Laister, Vice-Chairman, Southport Savings Committee.
- Ian Claud Imlach Lamb, Engineer-in-Charge, Independent Television Authority Transmitting Station, Emley Moor, Yorkshire.
- Albert Edward Laney, Mechanical and Electrical Technical Grade I, Ministry of Public Building and Works.
- Charles Lea, Senior Scientific Officer, Ministry of Aviation.
- Chung Yee Leung, Assistant Architect, Hong Kong, Ministry of Public Building and Works.
- Lewis Lewis. For services to Local Government in Monmouthshire.
- Alan Edward Lilley, Sales Director, Arthur Holland Confectionery Ltd. For services to Export.
- Margorie Grace Lloyd, Honorary Secretary, Newbiggin and North Seal on Savings Committee.
- Thomas Arthur Lloyd, Superintendent and Deputy Chief Constable, Warrington County Borough Police.
- Helen Henrietta Logan, Staff Officer, Board of Inland Revenue.
- William Hunt Longman. For services to Agriculture.
- Bertie Charles Lord, Technical (Mechanical and Electrical) Grade "B", Ministry of Public Building and Works.
- Edith Alice Lovell, Senior Executive Officer, Board of Trade.
- Leslie Lucas, Executive Officer, Ministry of Defence.
- Eileen Mary Lyons, Headmistress, Halesowen, Hill and Cakemore Secondary School for Girls, Blackheath, Birmingham.
- Joseph Edmond McCullough, Vice-Chairman, Belfast Schools' Savings Committee.
- David McFarlane, Senior Experimental Officer, Royal Air Force, Abingdon, Ministry of Defence (Royal Air Force).
- Robert Bilsland McGregor. For services to Swimming.
- Terence Bernard McGuinness, Senior Examiner, Estate Duty Office, Ministry of Finance for Northern Ireland.
- Donald Fraser Mackenzie, Senior Information Officer, Scottish Information Office.
- Thurrold Charles McKeown, Technical Grade I, Ministry of Public Building and Works.
- Elizabeth McCulloch McLean, Approved Schools Welfare Officer, Scotland.
- Robert Bruce McLean, Chief Officer, West Hartlepool Fire Brigade.
- James Laing MacMorran, Engineer-in-Charge, Public Works Department, Birmingham Corporation.
- Gladys Mansfield. For services to the community in Hallatrow, Bristol.
- Thomas Marr, Clerical Officer, Ministry of Public Building and Works.
- Ernest Marriott, MM, JP, Founder and Chairman, Bradford Flower Fund Homes.
- Derek Bernard Mayne, Senior Production Control Officer, Films Division, Central Office of Information.
- Frederick James Vaughan Mayne, MRCVS, Veterinary Officer, Ministry of Agriculture, Fisheries and Food.
- Robert Hunter Miller, Engineer Repair Manager, Henry Robb Ltd.
- Thomas Thirlwell Prentice Miller, Higher Executive Officer, Ministry of Defence (Royal Air Force).
- Flight Lieutenant Horace Roy Mitchell, Administrative Officer, No. 3 Welsh Wing, Air Training Corps, Ministry of Defence (Royal Air Force).
- Alderman Arthur Cyril Moles. For services to young people in Harwich.
- Marguerite Mary Moody, Typist, Grade I, Department of Education and Science.
- Fred Moorhouse, Grade 4 Officer, Ministry of Labour.
- Lieutenant-Commander Philip Jonathan Morgan, Royal Naval Reserve. For services to Sea Scouts in Fishguard.
- Ivy Maud Morris, lately Nursing Sister, Amersham General Hospital.
- Roland Haslem Morrison, Deputy Principal, Ministry of Health and Social Services for Northern Ireland.
- Florence Angela Margaret Mortimer. For services to Lawn Tennis.
- Alfred William John Moss, Area Accountant, London Telecommunications Region, South West Area, General Post Office.
- Clarence George Mothershaw, Alderman, Newcastle-under-Lyme Borough Council.
- Thomas Rex Mott, Councillor, Witham Urban District Council.
- Jessie Emmanuel Margaret Munro, MB, ChB, General Medical Practitioner, Edinburgh.
- David Murray, Sheep dog trial demonstrator.
- George Holywood Nelson, District Inspector, Royal Ulster Constabulary.
- Anne Nicholas, Chief Welfare Section Officer, Civil Defence Corps, Carmarthenshire.
- Thomas Buxton Nicholson, Senior Probation Officer, Newcastle upon Tyne.
- Wilfred Oke, Senior Court Welfare Officer, Royal Courts of Justice.
- Frank Leslie Othick, Secretary, Rating and Valuation Association.
- Guy Owen, JP, Member, Bedfordshire Agricultural Executive Committee.
- Kenneth Vernon Arthur Oxborrow, National Savings District Member for North East Essex.
- Gordon Packman, Engineer I, Reactor Group, United Kingdom Atomic Energy Authority, Risley.
- Stanley Palphramand, JP, Railway Clerk, York, British Railways Board.
- James Campbell Parker, Area Production Manager, Scottish Division, Ayrshire Area, National Coal Board.
- Harold Edward Parkinson, Personal Assistant to the Lords of Appeal, House of Lords.
- Thomas Edwin Griffin Parsons, Export Manager, The Marley Tile Company Ltd. For services to Export.
- Major William Albert Victor Payne, Secretary and Manager, Yateley Industries for Disabled Girls Ltd.
- George Henry Pearce, Preventive Officer, Board of Customs and Excise.
- James Derrick Pearce. For services to the Boy Scouts Association.
- Rachel Lilian Pennington, lately Women's Staff Officer, Navy, Army and Air Force Institutes.
- Rose Phillips, Higher Executive Officer, Ministry of Social Security.
- Philip William Philpott, Chief Superintendent, Metropolitan Police.
- Mary Ellen Pick, Headmistress, Harrowby Infants' School, Grantham.
- Stanley William Pilcher, Maxillo-Facial Technician, Holy Cross Hospital, Haslemere.
- Edgar Stewart Pillow, Grade 7 Officer, HM Diplomatic Service.
- Victor John Pitcher. Chairman, Schools Sub-Committee, Haringey Borough Savings Committee.
- Charlotte Alexena May Powell. For services to amateur drama in Wales.
- Irene Elizabeth Priaulx, lately Grade 3 Officer, Ministry of Labour.
- Laurence. Emile Priesack, Manager, British Travel Association, Los, Angeles.
- Pauline Alice Pugh, Assistant Regional Donor Organiser, Blood Transfusion Service, Welsh Hospital Board.
- John Reid. For services to the community in Kilbirnie, Ayrshire.
- Stanley Thomas Renn, Senior Executive Officer, Department of Economic Affairs.
- William Renton, JP, Town Clerk and Chamberlain of Duns, Berwickshire.
- Edgar James Richardson, Senior Vehicle Examiner, Eastern Traffic Area, Ministry of Transport.
- Mary Alexandra Robb, MB, ChB, County Director, Angus Branch, British Red Cross Society.
- Alastair Smith Robertson, Managing Director, Walker Caledon Ltd.
- Andrew Morrison Robertson, lately Chairman, Stirling Local Employment Committee.
- William Duncan Robertson, Safety Officer, Enfield Rolling Mills Ltd.
- Elsie Robson, JP. For services to Education in County Durham.
- Arthur Leslie Rogers, Honorary Secretary, St. Agnes and Perranzabuloe Savings Committee.
- Eric Rogers, Redevelopment Assistant, Southern Region, British Waterways Board.
- William Alexander Rogers, Member, lately Deputy Chairman, Oxfordshire Agricultural Executive Committee.
- Hugh Colin Roscoe, Chairman, No. 162 (Stockport) Squadron Committee, Air Training Corps.
- Elsie Josephine Rusbridger, Voluntary hospital worker, Lancashire.
- Ronald James Rushen, Assistant Works Manager Servicing, London (Heathrow) Station.
- William Edward Rushforth, Senior Executive Officer, Ministry of Agriculture, Fisheries and Food.
- Doreen Nellie Grace Rust, formerly Executive Officer, Ministry of Agriculture, Fisheries and Food.
- John Howard Saunders, Head of Estimating Department, Walter Somers Ltd.
- Hubert Basil Thackeray Schwabe. For services to physically-handicapped youth in Wolverhampton.
- Ronnie David Bell Mitchell Shade. For services to Golf.
- Margaret Hunter Shannon, Chief Superintendent of Typists, Ministry of Agriculture for Northern Ireland.
- George William Shaw, lately Managing Secretary, Benevolent and Orphan Fund of the National Union of Teachers.
- Eric Sheckell, lately Local Reporter, Grimsby Evening Telegraph.
- Captain Joseph Tinsley Sheffield, RD, Master, MV Newfoundland, Furness, Withy and Company, Ltd.
- Clifford John Shelley, Model Designer, Scottish Development Department.
- Herbert Arthur Brettell Shepherd, Divisional Officer, London Fire Brigade.
- Fred Wilson Sheppard, Area Officer, Hampshire Rural Community Council.
- Bernard Sherlock, Chairman, Ballycastle Urban District Council.
- John Sherratt, Superintendent, Head Post Office, Stoke-on-Trent.
- Lionel Harry Vaughan Shopland, lately Chairman, National Association of Land Settlement Association Tenants.
- Leslie Howard William Howard-Silvester, Experimental Officer, Royal Radar Establishment, Ministry of Aviation.
- James Edward Sloan, lately Northern Ireland District Secretary, Amalgamated Transport and General Workers' Union.
- James Noel Smales, Senior Executive Officer, Export Credits Guarantee Department, Board of Trade.
- Dennis George Smith, Deputy Engineer-in-Chief, Cable and Wireless Ltd.
- Edna Smith, Chief Superintendent of Typists, Ministry of Defence (Royal Air Force).
- John Robert Grunson Smith, Area Engineer, South-East Telephone Area, General Post Office.
- Mary Elizabeth Henrietta Smith, Senior Housing Manager, Crown Estate Housing Estates.
- Thomas Sneddon, Headmaster, Blacklaw Primary School, Dunfermline.
- Herbert Leslie Spencer, Higher Executive Officer, Ministry of Power.
- Richard Spencer. For services to Health and Education in North-West Lancashire.
- George Arthur Stagg, Senior Draughtsman, Foreign Office.
- Christobel Eunice Mozley-Stark, Main Grade, Departmental Professional Class (Pharmacist), Ministry of Health.
- Charles Frederick Stevens, Executive Officer, Ministry of Social Security.
- Audrey Eleanor Stewart, BEM, Honorary Secretary, Shaftesbury Division, Dorsetshire, Soldiers', Sailors' and Airmen's Families Association.
- Leonard Roberts Stone, Chief Steward, MV Amazon, Royal Mail Lines Ltd.
- Thomas Stringer, Drawing Office Services Manager and Chief Draughtsman, Imperial Chemical Industries, Mond Division.
- Harold Arthur Summerfield, Head of Experimental Manufacture, Rotax Ltd.
- Squadron Leader Michael Robert Eric Swanwick, Chairman, Chesterfield and District War Pensions Committee.
- Alexander George Tasker, Divisional Surveyor, Cambridgeshire and the Isle of Ely County Council.
- Leonard George Taylor, Training Service Officer Grade I, Ministry of Labour.
- Marjorie Emily Unsworth Taylor, Cabin Staff Manager, British Eagle International Airlines Ltd.
- Agnes Mary Thomas. For services to youth in Shropshire.
- David Beynon Thomas, Temporary Assistant Land Commissioner, Ministry of Agriculture, Fisheries and Food.
- Beatrice Mary Thompson, lately Children's Welfare Officer, Northern Region, Women's Royal Voluntary Service.
- Robert John Thompson, BEM, Main Grade Civil Engineer, Ministry of Public Building and Works.
- Leonard Duncan Thomson, Chairman, Hammersmith, Kensington and Chelsea War Pensions Committee.
- William Sutherland Thomson, Colour Photographer. For services to the Scottish Tourist Board.
- Mollie Story Chapman Thwaites, Office Manager, Furniture Development Council.
- Frederick John Tollett, Chief Maintenance Officer, Yard Services Department, Ministry of Defence (Royal Navy).
- Cecil Harry Robert Tomlinson, Lately Technical Grade B, Royal Mint.
- Cycill Geraldine Tomrley, Staff Officer, Grade III, Council of Industrial Design.
- Arthur Edgar Toy, Clerk of the Aylesbury Rural District Council, Buckinghamshire.
- Elizabeth Duncan Tulloch, Senior Personal Secretary, Ministry of Technology.
- Ernest William Turner, Technical Class Grade I, Royal Aircraft Establishment, Ministry of Aviation.
- Francis George Tyson, Superintendent, Egham Industrial Rehabilitation Unit, Ministry of Labour.
- Philip Varley, Chairman, Blackpool and District Employment Committee.
- Phyllis Louise Venard, Higher Executive Officer, Ministry of Public Building and Works.
- Carmel Publius Sebastian Peter Ellul Vincenti, local Assistant Armament Supply Officer, Malta, Ministry of Defence (Royal Navy).
- Norah Evelyn Wadsley, Establishment Assistant, Monitoring Service, British Broadcasting Corporation.
- Arthur Walker. For services to the National Federation of Sub-Postmasters.
- Edwin Arthur Claughton Walker, Higher Executive Officer, Ministry of Social Security.
- Tudor John Walker, Clerk of the Council, Glyncorrwg Urban District Council, Glamorgan.
- Percy James Walkington, Secretary and Wardens' Clerk, The Hull Trinity House.
- Edward William Wallis, Regional Building Surveyor, Board of Inland Revenue.
- Winifred Gertrude Walton, Member, Civil Defence and Reception Committee, Tutbury Rural District Council.
- Edith Evelyn Warburton, Senior Personal Secretary, Ministry of Technology.
- Mary Emeline Warren, National Secretary, Women's Section, British Legion.
- Fergus Watson, TD. Area Superintendent, South Western Area, United Kingdom Region, Commonwealth War Graves Commission.
- John Watts, Executive Officer, Ministry of Defence (Royal Air Force).
- Edgar John Boulton-Way, Warden, Tothill Community Centre, Plymouth.
- Stanley John Wells, Cypher Superintendent, Government Communications Headquarters.
- James Alfred West, Production and Projects Manager, Park Brothers Ltd.
- Wilfred Cyril Sprye Wigley, Group I Consultant and Adviser to Superintendent, Admiralty Experiment Works, Haslar.
- Charles David Barry Williams, Chief Welfare Officer, London Postal Region, General Post Office.
- Jack Ivor Arthur Williams. For services to the community in Caerleon, Monmouthshire, especially to Education.
- Olive Williams, Secretary, National League of Hospital Friends.
- Vincent Allenby Williams, BEM, Assistant Chief Cartographer, Directorate of Overseas Surveys, Ministry of Overseas Development.
- Eugene Kenneth Willson, Chief Administrative Officer, Association Football World Cup Organisation.
- Reginald Arthur Wilson, Founder and Honorary Secretary, British Migraine Association.
- Sidney Randolph Wilson. For social services in Jarrow.
- Mary Winter, Higher Executive Officer, Government Communications Headquarters.
- Andrew Young, Chairman, Guiseley and District Local Employment Committee.
- Frederick Alfred Young, Telecommunications Technical Officer Grade I, Ministry of Defence (Royal Air Force).

Diplomatic Service and Overseas List

- Eleanor Winifred Winston Agard, (Mrs. Atkinson), Head of Registry, British Information Services, New York.
- Mary Irene Anderson, Headmistress, Aburi Girls' Secondary School, Ghana.
- Peter Ayres, lately Assistant Technical Adviser, Revenue Division, Ministry of Finance, Northern Nigeria.
- Colin Arthur Baker, Deputy Principal, Institute of Public Administration, Malawi.
- Brian Donald Anderson Beck, Principal Research Officer, Federal Department of Agricultural Research, Nigeria.
- William Arthur Bennett, MM, Assistant Broadcasting Officer, British Solomon Islands Protectorate.
- The Very Reverend Moses Haim Solomon Benzimra, formerly Senior Minister, Shaar Hashamayin Synagogue, Gibraltar.
- Mary Estelle Biddle, lately Headmistress, Highlands Girls' School, Eldoret, Kenya.
- Gordon William Joseph Blackman, British subject resident in Belgium.
- Lieutenant-Colonel Ronald Owen Norman Bobb, Assistant Editor, British Information Services, New Delhi.
- James Edward Boyle, Director of Music, Nigeria Police Force.
- Marie Aline Bozelle, Secretary, Governor's Office, Mauritius.
- Domenic Brancaleone, British Pro-Consul, Istanbul.
- Donald McKinnon Brander, Lecturer in English, University of Iceland.
- Roger Gwyne Brereton, Principal Produce Officer, Northern Nigeria.
- Guillermo Pakenham Bridges, British Vice-Consul, Rio Grande, Tierra del Fuego.
- Percy Charles Burdett, lately Trade Commissioner, Christchurch Office of British High Commission in New Zealand.
- Vincent Fitzgerald Byron, Warden of Anguilla, St. Christopher-Nevis-Anguilla.
- Chan Hon-yin, General Clerical Service, Special Class, Hong Kong.
- John Ronald Charlton, JP, Laboratory Technician. For public and voluntary services in St. Helena.
- Joseph Cheung Chok-tang. For voluntary service to youth in Hong Kong.
- Stanley George Cook, Second Secretary, British High Commission, Lusaka.
- George Herbert Cordon, Headmaster, St. George's Preparatory School, Buenos Aires.
- Donald William Coulthard, lately Assistant Works Manager, Nigeria.
- Vera Mary Catherine Creaton, Senior Dental Therapy Instructor, Nigeria.
- Gordon William Henry Dawson, Transport Supervisor, Hadhrami Beduin Legion.
- Agathe Maria Doerr, British Vice-Consul, Basle.
- Audrey Madeline Duchesne, British subject resident in Belgium.
- Charles Lovell Duly, lately Senior Accountant, East African Railways and Harbours.
- Demetrius Emmanuelides, Clerk, Her Majesty's Embassy, Athens.
- Hilda Gladys Etchells, British Vice-Consul, Santiago.
- Agnes Christine Evans, British subject resident in Chile.
- Evelyn Mary Franz, British subject resident in Austria.
- George William Fuller, lately Warden, Outward Bound School, Lumut, Perak.
- Phyllis Garraway. For services to the Community and to the Girl Guide Movement in Dominica.
- Eileen Mary Gaylard, Private Secretary to Her Majesty's Ambassador, Washington.
- George Ralph Gibbon, Pharmacist Mbabane Hospital. For services to the Boy Scout movement in Swaziland.
- Francis Jones Gosling. For voluntary service, particularly in the field of sport in Bermuda.
- Terence Grady, Her Majesty's Consul, Philadelphia.
- Patrick McGettigan Grant, Chief Superintendent of Police, Nigeria.
- David Wilson Guillan, Deputy Superintendent of Police, Malaysia.
- Ronald Geoffrey Hampshire, lately British Consul, Santos, Brazil.
- Sybil Albina Mary Hayward, British subject resident in Spain.
- Francis Leopold Hill, British subject resident in Switzerland.
- Stephen Ho Yum-suen, Assistant Secretary for Chinese Affairs, Hong Kong.
- Richard Denis Hook, lately Chief Police Officer, Seychelles.
- Evelyn Clifford Hutchison, Grade III Officer, Her Majesty's Embassy, Rabat.
- Fitzgerald Herbert James, Government Printer, St. Vincent.
- Ethel Baynard Johns, British subject resident in Italy.
- Eric Cockson-Jones, Lecturer in Accountancy, Institute of Chartered Accountants of Ceylon.
- Eric Hilton Jones, a former Under-secretary (Economist), Uganda.
- Eileen Joan Kellerd, Personal Assistant to Commercial Secretary, Her Majesty's Embassy, Montevideo.
- Kessina Winona Kinnear. For services to education in the Bahamas.
- Lim Kee-chin. For voluntary and social services, particularly to youth in Hong Kong.
- Rosa Loseby, JP. For public and social services in Hong Kong.
- Roy Edward Mankelow, Accountant, National and Grindlay's Bank Ltd, Kampala.
- Donald Henry Mather, First Secretary (Commercial), British High Commission, Kingston.
- Jean McHardy, Executive Secretary, British Benevolent Society, San Francisco.
- Louis Gregory Augier McVane, JP. For public services in St. Lucia.
- Mabel Emma Doris Meissner, British subject resident in Germany.
- William Serviss Kinnear Millar, Commercial Attaché, Her Majesty's Embassy, Oslo.
- Francis Patrick William Moor, Grade 10 Officer, Her Majesty's Diplomatic Service, seconded to Ministry of Defence for duty with Scientific Adviser to the Pakistan Meteorological Service.
- Cecil Edward Fisher Morgan, Agricultural Supervisor, Agricultural Trial Centre, Digdagga, Ras al Khaimah.
- Clarice May Morgan, Matron, E Metera Children's Home, Athens.
- Hugues Moussu, Market Officer, Her Majesty's Embassy, Tunis.
- Eugenia Hyacinth Nicholls, Assistant Secretary, Dominica.
- Kate Elizabeth Niesner, British subject resident in Austria.
- Charles Almond Nisbett. For public services in St. Christopher-Nevis-Anguilla.
- Desmond Patrick O'Shea, lately Senior Establishment Officer, East African Railways and Harbours.
- Malcolm Peat, Adviser in Physiotherapy, Institute of Para-Medical Sciences, Rangoon.
- George Edmund Pepper, Supervisor, Communications Station, Dhekelia.
- Beryl Joan Pilcher, Personal Assistant to the Permanent United Kingdom Representative, North Atlantic Council.
- Jack Robert Campbell Pincombe, Deputy Establishment Secretary, Uganda.
- Winifred Mary Pridham, lately Principal, Women's Training College, Kabba, Northern Nigeria.
- Ignatius Cypriano Rangel, Legal Draftsman, Office of the Federal Advocate-General, Aden.
- Alexander Edward Requena, Schoolmaster, Education Department, Gibraltar.
- Claudius Matthias Roberts, Deputy Superintendent, Royal St. Vincent Police Force.
- Annie Redhead Robson, Headmistress, St. Saviour's Primary School, Ikoyi, Lagos.
- Anatol Carridad Rodgers, Assistant Teacher, Government High School, Nassau. For service to the community in voluntary organisations in the Bahamas.
- Constance Isabel Sandham, Principal Inspector of Education, Western Nigeria.
- George Harry Sands, Assistant Administration Officer, Her Majesty's Embassy, Vienna.
- Ruby May Sedgwick, Senior Matron, Adeoyo Hospital, Ibadan, Western Nigeria.
- Evelyn Graham Hamilton Shepherd, Principal, Archdeacon Crowther Memorial Grammar School, Elelenwa, Port Harcourt.
- John Ferdinand Shoul. For services to the community in Antigua.
- Ira Marcus Simmons, Permanent Secretary, Ministry of Education, Health and Social Affairs, St. Lucia.
- Desmond Andrew Singh. For public services in Fiji.
- Jack Charles Collings Sloman, Assistant Trade Commissioner, British Government Office, Vancouver.
- Ian Mayo-Smith, lately Programme Specialist for Executive Training, Staff Development Centre, Northern Nigeria.
- Gillian Emma Solly, President, East Africa Women's League.
- Basil John Stenning, Commercial Officer, Her Majesty's Embassy, Paris.
- Irene Madge Taylor, Senior Mistress, St. Mark's High School, Mbabane, Swaziland.
- Herbert George Boyce-Taylor, Assistant Comptroller of Customs and Excise, Sarawak, Malaysia.
- Ellison Adelbert Thompson, Administrative Secretary, Ministry of Works, Bahamas.
- Benjamin Thorne, British Trade Commissioner, Hong Kong.
- William Brian Till, lately Assistant Surveyor-General, Western Nigeria.
- Magnus William Todd, Deputy Engineer-in-Chief, Ministry of Works, Communications and Housing, Uganda.
- Roger Clive Tutt, lately Assistant Administrator, Turks and Caicos Islands.
- Winifred Elizabeth Wainwright, Principal, Ogbomosho Girls' High School, Nigeria.
- Brian Lomax Walker, Senior Administrative Officer, Malawi.
- Michael Edward Walkinshaw. For public services in Montserrat.
- Peter John Heady, Administrative Officer, Bechuanaland.
- Morare Tholo Molema, Chief's Representative, Baralong Tribal Headquarters, Bechuanaland.
- Emelia Gertrude Stiles, Personal Assistant to Commissioner of Police, Bechuanaland.
- Josephine Motaung, Nurse, Medical Department, Basutoland.
- Sidney Harry Youthed, Soil Conservation Officer, Basutoland.
- Cameron Dowding Dean Spencer, Buildings and Handicrafts Officer, Ministry of Education, Barbados.

State of New South Wales

- Dorothy Clarkson, of Newcastle. For services to the community, especially neglected children.
- Gertrude Maude Codrington. For social welfare services in the Inverell district.
- Kenneth Percival Howard. For charitable services to the community.
- Edith Marion Ralston, a former Headmistress of Wenona School, North Sydney. For services to education.
- Ruby Rich Schalit. For community welfare services, particularly as a leader of movements for the advancement of women.
- Zilla Alice Triggs, President of the Grafton Auxiliary of the Returned Services League.
- Leslie Clarence Wellings. For services to local government, particularly as Town Clerk of Manly.

State of Victoria

- Kenneth Fox Adam, JP, of Torrumbarry. For services to local government and the community.
- Eirene May Appleton, of Malvern. For social welfare services for many years.
- Rupert Bassett, JP, of Yarraville. For local government and community welfare services.
- Ernest Oliver Bidstrup, JP, of Broadford. For services to local government and the community.
- Helen Elizabeth Chandler. For services to the community in The Basin district.
- Maisie Carrothers Ewan, lately President of the Committee of Management, Yooralla Hospital School for Crippled Children.
- Edward Noel Thomas Henry, JP, Town Clerk of Portland.
- Herbert David Mitchell, JP. For services to the community, particularly as a Councillor and former President of the Shire of Glenelg.
- Jabez Jagger Potts, JP. For services to education and the community in Kaniva.
- Mavis Prytz. For services to nursing, particularly as past President of the Royal Women's Hospital.
- Fussell John Richardson, of Castlemaine. For social welfare services, particularly to ex-servicemen and their dependants.

State of Queensland

- Darcy St. George Armstrong, of Dalby. For services to local government.
- The Reverend Hugh Robert Ballard, MC, ED, of Toowoomba. For services to the community, particularly to delinquent and under-privileged children.
- Harold Charles Dickinson, of Brisbane. For services to the blind.
- Dorothy Hawthorn, of Brisbane. For community and social welfare services.
- Jack Burnside Heaps, of Bundaberg. For community welfare services, particularly to the sick aged.
- Gertrude Maude Amelia Stewart, of Brisbane. For services to the rehabilitation of prisoners.
- Bert Yeldham, Superintendent of the Ingham Branch, Queensland Ambulance Transport Brigade.

State of Western Australia

- Eileen Ruth Lathlean Johnson. For services to the Women's College, University of Western Australia.
- William Edward McKenna, JP, lately Chairman, Bunbury Harbour Board.
- Ernest Macleod, President of the 11th and 2/11th Battalions Association.
- Joseph Clarke Pereira. For services to the trade union movement in Western Australia.

State of Tasmania

- Edith Mary Jessie Ransom, of Longford. For services to the community, particularly the Country Women's Association.
- Arthur Gordon Stokes, of Burnie. For services to the community, particularly to ex-servicemen.
- John Arthur Turnbull, of New Town. For services to local government and the community.

=== Order of the Companions of Honour (CH) ===
- Sir William Lawrence Bragg, OBE, MC. For services to Science.
- Sir Robert Eric Mortimer Wheeler, CIE, MC, TD. For services to Archaeology.

=== Companion of the Imperial Service Order (ISO) ===
Home Civil Service

- Margaret Lamb Dalgleish, MBE, Chief Executive Officer, Diplomatic Service Administration Office.
- Arthur Ernest Eburne, Chief Executive Officer, Ministry of Defence.
- John Green, Chief Executive Officer, Board of Inland Revenue.
- Cyril Edwin Charles Hurst, Senior Mechanical and Electrical Engineer, Ministry of Public Building and Works.
- Isabella Lamb, Grade 2 Officer, Ministry of Labour.
- Michael Thomas Leddy, lately Principal Executive Officer, Home Office.
- Stephen John Lowdell, Chief Engineer, Explosives Research and Development Establishment, Waltham Abbey, Ministry of Aviation.
- Frank Leslie McHenry, OBE, Principal, Royal Mint.
- Reginald Mather, Senior Chief Executive Officer, Ministry of Social Security.
- John Richard Milborrow, MBE, Senior Chief Executive Officer, Ministry of Power.
- Henry Thomas Mitchell, Staff Engineer, Post Office Research Station, Dollis ?????
- Geoffrey Moses, Assistant Secretary, Ministry of Defence (Royal Navy).
- Cyril William Mothersill, Chief Executive Officer, Board of Customs and Excise.
- Leslie Wallace Mullinger, District Alkali Inspector, Ministry of Housing and Local Government.
- Thomas Henry Parker, Official Receiver, Brighton, Board of Trade.
- Cyril Ernest Phillips, Deputy Chief Scientific Officer, National Engineering Laboratory, Ministry of Technology.
- Edgar Wolston Bertram Handsley Milne-Redhead, TD, Senior Principal Scientific Officer, Ministry of Agriculture, Fisheries and Food.
- William Henry Redman, MBE, Chief Clerk, Central Officer of the Supreme Court, Lord Chancellor's Department.
- John Percival Simms. Lately Commissioner of Valuation for Northern Ireland.
- John McGregor Fraser Smith, Senior Chief Executive Officer, Ministry of Defence (Army).
- George Simpson Stirling, Sheriff Clerk of Renfrewshire at Paisley.
- Herbert Tom Atkinson Tregear, Deputy Regional Controller, Midland Region, Ministry of Social Security.

Overseas Civil Service

- Phebure Savrimoutou, lately Chief Surveyor, Ministry of Housing, Lands and Town and Country Planning, Mauritius.
- Yeung Kam-on, Assistant Superintendent of Urban Services, Hong Kong.
- Philip Evelyn Going, lately Comptroller of Stores, Basutoland.

=== British Empire Medal (BEM) ===
Military Division

Royal Navy

- Chief Petty Officer (Coxswain) Dennis Gordon Bullock, P/JX712672.
- Chief Electrician Robert Bushell, D/MX833708.
- Chief Petty Officer (Gli) Edwin Coltas Cappleman, P/JX151177.
- Quartermaster Sergeant Francis Joseph Clark, PO/XS103, Royal Marines.
- Chief Communication Yeoman Richard Aloysius Pittendrigh Dellenty, D/JX712738.
- Chief Petty Officer Martin Henry Dukeman P/JX134841.
- Chief Engine Room Artificer Raymond Herbert George, D/MX708064.
- Chief Engine Room Artificer Albert Knox, P/MX77418.
- Mechanician (1st Class) Arthur William Littlejohn, P/KX92178 (on loan to the Royal Malaysian Navy).
- Medical Technician I Thomas William Mccarthy, P/MX65551.
- Chief Petty Officer Writer Robert James McEwen, P/MX742033.
- Petty Officer Peter McSweeney, P/JX159420.
- Chief Wren Cook (O) Ada Elizabeth Rose Murrell, 54827, Women's Royal Naval Service.
- Chief Engineering Mechanic (OW) Leslie Richard Oare D/KX847183.
- Chief Engine Room Artificer Robert Edric Osman, D/MX855777 (formerly serving with the British Joint Services Training Team, Ghana).
- Chief Petty Officer (TAS I) Ephraim Parker, D/JX175975.
- Engine Room Artificer (1st Class) Alan John Porter, P/MX703842 (formerly on loan to the Royal Malaysian Navy).
- Chief Electrician Denis Price, D/MX876722.
- Chief Electrician (Air) Norman Reeve, L/FX93349.
- Acting Chief Petty Officer (Coxswain) David Williamson Reid, D/JX838805.
- Chief Petty Officer (Coxswain) Robert George Rigden, P/JX818403.
- Chief Petty Officer Walter Rudman, P/JX140867.
- Petty Officer Writer Edward George Stammer, Q001864, Royal Naval Reserve.
- Chief Air Fitter (A/E) Richard Abbot Neville Denton Temple, L/FX79781.
- Quartermaster Sergeant Derek Austin Terence Torr, PLY/X5202, Royal Marines.
- Chief Engine Room Artificer Peter John Treen, P/MX778207.
- Chief Airman (AHI) Douglas Arthur Roy Trickle, L/FX670264.
- Chief Petty Officer (GAI) Albert Ward, D/JX890944.
- Chief Air Fitter (A/E) Robert James Webber, L/FX76207.
- Chief Mechanician James Thompson Whyte, D/KX847436 (formerly on loan to the Royal Malaysian Navy).
- Chief Petty Officer Writer Douglas Charles Wilkinson, P/MX856084.
- Chief Petty Officer (GLI) Arthur Roy Williams, D/JX144134 (formerly serving with the British Joint Services Training Team, Ghana).
- Quartermaster Sergeant Peter Howard Woolley, PLY/X4635, Royal Marines.
- Chief Electrical Artificer (Air) John William Worthington, L/FX669888.

Army

- 23732057 Sergeant Ian Kirkey Atkinson, Royal Corps of Transport.
- 21002471 Warrant Officer Class II (local) Joseph Thomas Baker, Corps of Royal Electrical and Mechanical Engineers, Territorial Army.
- 22541024 Staff Sergeant (acting) Frank Bibby, Corps of Royal Electrical and Mechanical Engineers.
- 22219861 Sergeant William Arthur Henry Birney, The Royal Inniskilling Fusiliers, Territorial Army.
- 23477078 Staff Sergeant Albert Augustus Blackburn, Army Catering Corps, Territorial Army.
- W/6893 Sergeant Hilda Lilian Burden, Women's Royal Army Corps.
- 22316404 Warrant Officer Class II (acting) Ewan Burnett, Corps of Royal Engineers, on loan to the Government of Malaysia.
- 19046379 Warrant Officer Class II (local) Harry Carlill, Corps of Royal Electrical and Mechanical Engineers.
- 21181661 Staff Sergeant (now Warrant Officer Class II) Thomas John Chapman, 4th/7th Royal Dragoon Guards, Royal Armoured Corps.
- 22559934 Staff Sergeant Keith Newby Cowen, Corps of Royal Military Police.
- 19036726 Staff Sergeant Ronald James Crawford, Royal Army Ordnance Corps.
- 23512854 Sergeant Charles Edwin Doust, Royal Army Ordnance Corps.
- 22207523 Staff Sergeant Stanley Furness, Royal Regiment of Artillery, Territorial Army.
- 23701387 Sergeant John Raymond Gallagher, Royal Corps of Signals.
- 23022182 Sergeant William Hastie Gatherum, Scots Guards.
- 23543712 Sergeant Malcolm Stewart Gray, Intelligence Corps.
- 22843220 Staff Sergeant Anthony Thomas Keane, Royal Army Ordnance Corps, on loan to the Government of Malaysia.
- 14468003 Staff Sergeant Guy Edward Lavender, The Queen's Own Hussars, Royal Armoured Corps.
- 851795 Staff Sergeant Richard Owen Leach, DCM, Royal Regiment of Artillery.
- 22243852 Lance Corporal Denis James Leadbeater, The North Staffordshire Regiment (The Prince of Wales's), Territorial Army.
- 22256960 Sergeant John Whyte Leitch, The Argyll and Sutherland Highlanders (Princess Louise's), Territorial Army.
- 23749018 Corporal William George Lidster, Royal Corps of Signals.
- 23106356 Warrant Officer Class II (acting) Eric Lupton, Royal Pioneer Corps.
- 10543033 Staff Sergeant (acting) Douglas Alfred Marshall, Corps of Royal Electrical and Mechanical Engineers.
- 22284762 Staff Sergeant William Newton, Royal Corps of Transport, Territorial Army.
- 23238650 Corporal Alan Edwin Poyner, Corps of Royal Military Police.
- 23869591 Sergeant George Robert Price, The Royal Hampshire Regiment, Territorial Army.
- 23474328 Sergeant Alfred Pritchard, Coldstream Guards.
- 22246158 Staff Sergeant Ernest Charles Prosser, Corps of Royal Engineers.
- 4210170 Staff Sergeant William Roberts, The Royal Welch Fusiliers, Territorial Army.
- 2705389 Staff Sergeant (acting) Ronald Cecil Ryves, Scots Guards.
- 21188277 Staff Sergeant Roy Robert Kinloch Shepherd, Intelligence Corps.
- 22520439 Sergeant Joseph Snelson, The Cheshire Regiment, Territorial Army.
- 22991694 Staff Sergeant Arthur Tracey, Royal Army Ordnance Corps.
- 23215793 Corporal of Horse (acting) Raymond Derek John Wilmott, Royal Horse Guards.

Royal Air Force

- P0584989 Flight Sergeant David William Argue.
- X1151712 Flight Sergeant Frederick George Bates.
- T0570972 Flight Sergeant Albert Henry Newham Beaumont.
- A3501932 Flight Sergeant Henry George Joyce.
- W0641055 Flight Sergeant Leonard Austin Lomas.
- S1925973 Flight Sergeant Keith Nelson.
- K0541291 Flight Sergeant James Chadwick Openshaw.
- B1270905 Flight Sergeant John Searle.
- T2337618 Flight Sergeant Frederick James Slater.
- H1822882 Flight Sergeant (Acting Warrant Officer) Richard Stenton.
- B0537117 Flight Sergeant Francis Thomas Wilkins.
- PI0618155 Chief Technician Donald Leo Cash.
- Y0952315 Chief Technician Leonard Cherry.
- V0582964 Chief Technician Andrew Baird Dunbar.
- S1921522 Chief Technician Allan Greenwood.
- L0575288 Chief Technician Hugh Jackson.
- B2261979 Chief Technician Thomas Galloway Muir.
- M0592310 Chief Technician Alistair John William Robins.
- R4049078 Chief Technician Norman Alan Smith. For services while on loan to the Royal Malaysian Air Force.
- C0516923 Chief Technician Edward James Strickland.
- V1437236 Chief Technician Francis James Turner. For services while on loan to the Kenya Air Force.
- A0642491 Chief Technician Charles John Wainika.
- Q0579142 Acting Flight Sergeant Frederick Eustace Lemon.
- U4121494 Sergeant William Allison.
- G4052308 Sergeant Walter Shaw Banks.
- J2331569 Sergeant Frederick George Biddle.
- M2323908 Sergeant Reginald Ernest Day.
- T1482870 Sergeant John Graburn, Royal Air Force Regiment.
- Y4095279 Sergeant Ceiriog Hughes.
- A0586872 Sergeant Maurice Patrick Bernard Kidney.
- Y2737790 Sergeant John Francis Miller.
- R1901563 Sergeant John Moore.
- F4026686 Sergeant John Alan Morfitt.
- Y4091453 Sergeant Thomas Orr.
- R4203327 Corporal Timothy Guyon Richards.
- A4125940 Corporal Leslie Frederick Charles Wheeler.
- S1942754 Junior Technician Gerald Benjamin Lee.

Civil Division

United Kingdom

- Frank Alexander, Mate-in-Charge, Launch Service, Poole, Board of Customs and Excise.
- Clifford Allen, Foreman, Cold Rolling Mills, Arthur Lee & Sons Ltd.
- John Avraamides, Civilian Stores Officer Grade II, Cyprus, Ministry of Defence (Army).
- William Bainsfair, Driver, Central Electricity Generating Board.
- Robert William Barnes, Instructional Officer, Grade 3, Ministry of Labour.
- Alexander George Bavin, Sector Warden, Civil Defence Corps, Nottingham.
- Thomas Edward Beer, Chief Observer, Post 1/Q.2, Royal Observer Corps.
- Ethel Kate Bellamy, Allowance Deliverer, Redmile Sub-Post Office, Nottingham.
- Charles Smallpiece Bennett, Electrical Fitter, Sevenoaks and Reigate District, South Eastern Electricity Board.
- Joseph Alan Bessant, Chief Inspector, Kingston upon Hull City Police.
- Ellen Louise Billett, Member of Welfare Section, Civil Defence Corps, Eastbourne.
- Mervyn Birchenhough, Foreman (Marine), Heysham, London Midland Region, British Railways Board.
- William John Charles Blogg, Higher Grade Surveyor, Ordnance Survey, Ministry of Housing and Local Government.
- John Donald Bonser, JP, Underground Worker, New Hucknall Colliery, No. 4 Area, East Midlands Division, National Coal Board.
- Edith Boorer, Record Storewoman, United Kingdom Atomic Energy Authority, Aldermaston.
- Nina Inez Bratchell, Assistant Group Officer, Kent Fire Brigade.
- Leonard Joseph Bridges, Instructional Officer, Grade I, Ministry of Labour.
- Frank Briggs, lately Labourer, No. 2 Maintenance Unit, Sealand, Ministry of Defence (Royal Air Force).
- George Brown, Foreman Electrical Tester, Clarke Chapman & Co. Ltd, Gateshead.
- Cyril Bull, Senior Inspecting Officer, Ministry of Defence (Royal Navy).
- Alfred William Burnett, Mechanic Examiner, Electrical Inspection Directorate, Ministry of Aviation.
- James Sutherland Campbell, lately Chief Officer Class II, HM Prison, Edinburgh.
- Ronald Alfred Canneaux, Senior Instructor, Allen West & Company's Training School, Brighton.
- Reginald Carder, Telephonist, RAF Mount Batten (Ministry of Defence (Royal Air Force)).
- Zora Rogers Carson, Civil Defence Welfare Officer, Oxfordshire.
- Norman Edgar Chaffey, Senior Machine Shop Progress Engineer, Hamworthy Engineering Ltd, Poole.
- William Chapman, Site Superintendent, Head Wrightson Teesdale Ltd.
- Leonard Frederick Collyer, Chargehand, Grade I (Joiner), Ministry of Public Building and Works.
- Leslie William Cook, Chargehand Fitter, Sandall Precisions Co. Ltd, Bletchley.
- William Gordon Cowles, Assistant Civil Defence Training Officer, Hertfordshire County Council.
- Alexander Cross, General Foreman, Associated Bridge Builders, Severn Bridge.
- Doris Irene Date, Saleswoman, Literature Stall, House of Commons.
- Dorothy Rees Brookfield-Davies, Commandant, Denbigh/500, Denbighshire Branch, British Red Cross Society.
- William John Davies, Member, Warden Section, Civil Defence Corps, Swansea.
- Eric Ralph Dewdney, lately Technical Class Grade III, Royal Aircraft Establishment, Farnborough, Ministry of Aviation.
- Charles William George Dilley, Company Rescue Officer, Civil Defence Corps, Bristol.
- Grace Agnes Dobson, Manageress, Life-Raft Assembly R.F.D. Co. Ltd.
- Albert Edward Donlevy, Foreman in Charge, Process Department, British Aircraft Corporation (Operating) Ltd, Weybridge.
- Robert Thomas Drower, Cook/Steward, Gracechurch, General Service Contracts.
- William Duncan, Foreman Fitter, Wallsend Slipway & Engineering Co. Ltd.
- Robert Dunwoodie, Foreman, Glasgow, British Railways Board.
- Harold Leslie Easting, Carpenter, Mano, Elder Dempster Lines Ltd.
- Douglas George Eddolls, Chief Inspector, Metropolitan Special Constabulary.
- Stanley Graham Elsey, Bridge Foreman, Norfolk County Council.
- Dorothy Sophia Evans, Member of Headquarters Section, Civil Defence Corps, Somerset.
- Howard Rees Evans, Chief Inspector, Fram Filters Ltd, Glamorgan.
- Ronald Arthur Evans, Inspector, Telephone Manager's Office, Tunbridge Wells, General Post Office.
- James Cliff Bertram Fife, lately Chief Steward, SS British Beacon, B.P. Tanker Co. Ltd.
- Michael Daniel Finnie, Assistant Foreman of Works (Joiner), Ministry of Public Building and Works.
- Ernest Alfred Frankland, Works Technical Officer Grade II National Physical Laboratory, Ministry of Technology.
- Leonard Alexander John Fraser, Property Master, Rediffusion Ltd.
- Elizabeth Alice Garrett, District Organiser, Hackney, Women's Royal Voluntary Service.
- Edna May Gasper, Honorary Collector, Street and Village Savings Group, Aldershot.
- Kirk Gawn, Forester, Ministry of Agriculture for Northern Ireland.
- Leonard Blake Geere, Coast Preventive Man, Board of Customs and Excise.
- Robert Goodwyn, Driver, Ministry of Public Building and Works.
- Walter John Grant, Head Gardener, Belgium, Northern Region, Commonwealth War Graves Commission.
- Morral Greenall, Land Service Assistant Grade II, Agricultural Land Service, Ministry of Agriculture, Fisheries and Food.
- Henry Hancock, Chief Observer, Post 20/L.2, Royal Observer Corps.
- John Charles Hankinson, Permanent Chargeman of Shipwrights, Ministry of Defence (Royal Navy).
- Cendwen Hardie, Centre Organiser, Pontypridd, Women's Royal Voluntary Service.
- Harold Hardy, Civilian Instructor, No. 114 (Ruislip) Squadron, Air Training Corps.
- Ivy Hilda Hopkins-Harrington, Senior Chief Supervisor (Telephones), Birmingham Trunk and Toll Telephone Exchange, General Post Office.
- Hilda Harris, Honorary Collector, Street Savings Group, Scartho, Lincolnshire.
- William Harrison, Gateman, Linacre Works, Mersey Group, North Western Gas Board.
- Harry Hart, Inspector (Postal), Head Post Office, Tamworth.
- Enoch George Hartley, Employee, Hull No. 1 Factory, Remploy Ltd.
- Henry Edward Harvey, Office Keeper, Exchequer and Audit Department.
- James Harvie, Technical Grade II, Contracts Division, Ministry of Aviation.
- Ernest Victor Hatswell, Assembly Superintendent, Aircraft Navigation Instruments, Smiths Industries Ltd.
- George James Henderson, Sub-District Commandant, Ulster Special Constabulary.
- John Huby, Fire Officer, Bullcroft Colliery, No. 2 (Doncaster) Area, Yorkshire Division, National Coal Board.
- Alfred Frederick William Hudson, Station Officer, Cambridgeshire and Isle of Ely Fire Brigade.
- Ernest Edward Hussey, Mains and Services Inspector, Yeovil, South Western Gas Board.
- Robert Ernest Ivison, Sergeant, Cumberland, Westmorland and Carlisle Constabulary.
- Andrew Jamieson, Storekeeper, Douglas Colliery, Ayrshire Area, Scottish Division, National Coal Board.
- Edward Jones, Overman, Baggeridge Colliery, No. 2 (Cannock) Area, West Midlands Division, National Coal Board.
- William Jones, Leading Hand, Electric Power Storage Ltd, Swinton.
- Beatrice Rose Juden, Forewoman, Post Office Savings Bank.
- Alexander Thain Kay, Technical Officer, Telephone Exchange, Pitlochry, General Post Office.
- William Morrison Kennedy, Instrument Curator, Royal Victoria Hospital, Belfast.
- Sarkis Keoshkerian, Transport Clerk, British High Commission, Nicosia, Cyprus.
- William Lawrence Killip, Chief Officer Class I, HM Prison and Remand Centre, Risley.
- Francis Henry Kingdon, Supervisory Foreman, Freightliner Depot, London, British Railways Board.
- Harold Kitchener, Stores Supervisor Grade IV, Eastern Command Ordnance Depot, Ministry of Defence (Army).
- Gladys I. Knight, Head Cook, Victoria Hospital, Romford.
- Matilda Amelia Knowler, Assistant House Foreman, British Broadcasting Corporation.
- Lexie Gordon Lesenger, Manageress, NAAFI Cafeteria, Camp Voluceau, SHAPE.
- Noel Vivian Lewendon, Distribution Foreman, Nottingham District, East Midlands Gas Board.
- Henry George Linder, Company First Aid Officer, Civil Defence Corps, Norwich.
- John Llambias, Permit Office Attendant, HM Dockyard, Gibraltar.
- Emily Longman, Housemother, "Suncrest" Children's Home, Birmingham County Borough.
- Sidney Robert Lunniss, Locomotive Driver, King's Cross, British Railways Board.
- Colin McGavin, Divisional Commandant, City of Glasgow Special Constabulary.
- George McKenna, Shift Welder and Deputy Chargehand, Distillers Co. Ltd.
- John Ronald Macquay, Switchgear Foreman, Birmingham Area, Midlands Electricity Board.
- Reginald Ernest Marshall, Supervising Engineer III, Duke of York School, Dover, Ministry of Public Building and Works.
- Stanley Vincente George Marti, Civilian Instructor, No. 46F (Kensington) Squadron, Air Training Corps.
- Frederick Eustage May, Civilian Instructional Officer, HMS Sultan, Gosport, Ministry of Defence (Royal Navy).
- Frank Bernard Middleton, Chief Officer Class I, HM Borstal, Hollesley Bay.
- Mary Margaret Minihane, Reservations Officer, Westbury Hotel Office, British Overseas Airways Corporation.
- Bernard Joseph Molyneux, Chargehand Electrician, Ministry of Public Building and Works.
- John Morgan, Electrician, Bain Works, I.C.I. Ltd, Wilton.
- Ernest Morley, Boilerman, Swansea Hospital.
- Leonard Ralph Mosson, Foreman, No. 4 M.T. Squadron, Kidbrooke, Ministry of Defence (Royal Air Force).
- James Muirhead, Fitter, Grangemouth Refinery.
- Henry Charles Muncey, Senior Shipkeeper, HMS Warsash, Ministry of Defence (Royal Navy).
- Walter Theodore Nichol, Pumpman, SS Vertagus, Shell Tankers (U.K.) Ltd.
- Hubert Francis Nicholls, Superintendent of Works, Geilengirchen, Ministry of Public Building and Works.
- Victor Abel Nunn, General Foreman, South Durham Steel and Iron Co. Ltd.
- Clarice Padley. For services to the Swansea Unit, Sea Cadet Corps.
- Thomas William Page, Foreman Mason's Assistant, British Museum.
- Frederick Roy Paterson, Leader of Technical Information Services, The General Electric Co. Ltd.
- Robert Henry Pipes, Auxiliary Plant Attendant, Derby Power Station, Midlands Region, Central Electricity Generating Board.
- Edward Plant, School Warden, Royal Naval School, Malta.
- Leonard George Pond, Technician I, Piece Part Depot, General Post Office.
- Carey Richard Powell, Planned Maintenance Officer, Mardy Colliery, No. 4 (Aberdare) Area, South Western Division, National Coal Board.
- Alice Preston, Honorary Collector, Street Savings Group, Horsforth, Leeds.
- William Profit, lately Able Seaman, Hudson Firth, General Service Contracts.
- Thomas Arthur Randall, Yeoman Clerk, HM Tower of London, Ministry of Defence (Army).
- Wilfred George Read, Postal and Telegraph Officer, Head Post Office, Southampton.
- James Emile Rennards, Boatswain, Canberra, P. & O. Steam Navigation Co.
- Charles Victor Riehl, Chancery Messenger, HM Embassy, Berne.
- Ethel Rigal, Centre Organiser, Rickmansworth, Women's Royal Voluntary Service.
- Edward Griffiths Roberts, Road Travelling Foreman, Flintshire County Council.
- Emrys Roberts, Foreman, Air Products Ltd.
- Arthur Albert Robinson, Senior Foreman, Northamptonshire County Council.
- Charles Rush, Research and Development Craftsman "Special", Signals Research and Development Establishment, Ministry of Aviation.
- Kenneth Schofield, Telephonist-Receptionist, Yorkshire Egg Producers, Ltd, Drightlington.
- Jessie Scragg, Honorary Collector, Village Savings Group, Chelmsford.
- Edward John Sheil, Signalman (Power) Western Region, British Railways Board.
- Ernest Thomas Shepherd, Chief Supervisor (M), Toll/6s Exchange, General Post Office.
- Thomas Francis Short, Sergeant, Royal Ulster Constabulary.
- Ada Mary Simmonds, Commandant, S/Lincolnshire/6 Detachment, South Lincolnshire Branch, British Red Cross Society.
- Charles Albert Sims, Works Overseer Grade III, HM Stationery Office.
- William Arthur Skinner, Armature Winder, London Transport Board.
- Wilfred Ernest Slatcher, Assembly Foreman, Associated Electrical Industries Ltd, Rugby.
- Degary Edward Smith, Station Officer, Glamorgan Fire Service.
- Edward James Mead Smith, Inspector, Army Department Constabulary, Royal Mint.
- Maud Elizabeth Smith, Manageress, Refreshment Rooms, Euston, British Railways Board.
- Olive Smith, Commandant, Essex Branch, British Red Cross Society.
- Arthur Snape, Hospital Chief Officer Class I, HM Prison, Parkhurst.
- Elsie Winifred Snook, Honorary Collector, Village Savings Group, Coleford, Somerset.
- George Edward Spalding, Chief Engineer, Fishery Research Vessel Platesea, Ministry of Agriculture, Fisheries and Food.
- Charles John Spencer, Senior Attendant, Royal Courts of Justice, Lord Chancellor's Department.
- Harold Sprackland, Caretaker, Cambridge University Officers Training Corps.
- Ronald Leslie Stannard, MM, School Staff Instructor, City of London School Combined Cadet Force.
- Angus MacDonald Stark, Radio Overseer Officer-in-Charge, Humber Radio Station, General Post Office.
- Lawrence Arthur John Stibbards, Sergeant, Metropolitan Police.
- Charles Edward Taylor, Repository Assistant Foreman, Board of Trade.
- Frederick Charles Taylor, Section Chief Foreman, Avonmouth, Port of Bristol Authority.
- John William Tennison, Skilled Craftsman, Harwell, United Kingdom Atomic Energy Authority.
- Catherine Gwendoline Thomas, Honorary Collector, Street and Social Savings Groups, Portmadoc.
- Harold Thomas, Team Leader, Guided Weapon Trials, Short Brothers & Harland Ltd, Castlereagh, N. Ireland.
- Anthony Thompson, Stoneman, Bedlington "D" Colliery, South Northumberland Area, Northumberland and Durham Division, National Coal Board.
- Ronald Gibbs Towersey, Foreman, HM Stationery Office.
- Peter Frederick Tranter, Warrant Officer, No. 328 (Kingston) Squadron, Air Training Corps.
- Herbert Gordon Wainwright, Chief Inspector, UKAEA Constabulary, Windscale Works.
- Frances Walker, Assistant County Organiser Lincs/Lindsey, Women's Royal Voluntary Service.
- James Thomas Walker, British Waterways Board Messenger, Ministry of Transport.
- Rebecca Walker, Despatch Supervisor, G. T. Culpitt & Son Ltd. For services to Exports.
- Rebecca Walker, Kitchen Superintendent, The Hayward Schools, Bolton.
- Eden Matthew Ward, Technician IIA, Telephone Manager's Office Liverpool, General Post Office.
- Matthew Wardle, Personnel Assistant, Formica Ltd, North Shields.
- Albert Watson, Coxswain, Cromarty Lifeboat, Royal National Lifeboat Institution.
- Frederick William Watt, Chief Inspector (Postal) Western District Office, General Post Office.
- Ernest Francis Watts, Senior Paperkeeper, Board of Trade.
- Oliver Williams, Senior Heater, Slabbing Mill, John Summers & Sons Ltd.
- Eric Sidney Wilson, Postman, Norwich.
- Ethel Kathleen Wilson, Supervisor of Telephonists, Foreign Office.
- John William Wolfe, Electrical Inspector, Independent Television Authority.
- Francis Edward Wright, Grade I Instructor, Army Apprentices School, Carlisle, Ministry of Defence (Army).
- Alec Leslie Wrightson, Electric Welder, Shildon Wagon Works, British Railways Board.

Diplomatic Service and Overseas List

- Rebecca Allin-Brown Grant. For charitable and nursing services in Camaguey, Cuba.

Overseas Territories

- Solomon Henry Bachelor, Caretaker, Government House, Antigua.
- Cheung Kwok-wah, Liaison Officer Class III, Secretariat for Chinese Affairs, Hong Kong.
- Lilian Albertha Cadogan, Charge Nurse, Infirmary, Montserrat.
- Elaine Marshall, Superintendent, Home for the Aged and Infirm, St. Lucia.
- Mariola Savy, Nursing Sister (Grade 2) Seychelles.
- Moses Dlamini, Nduna at Havelock Mine, Emlembe, Swaziland.
- Mary Swain, Midwife, Tristan da Cunha.
- Te Timon Taeuba, Magistrate, Marakei, Gilbert and Ellice Islands Colony.
- Jabin Warahimae, District Headman, British Solomon Islands Protectorate.
- Kgopo Mokome Kgopo, School Secretary, Bangwaketse Tribal Administration, Bechuanaland.
- Evans McGregor Howard, Messenger, Labour Department, Barbados.

State of Victoria

- Arthur Ninian Cousland, Staff Foreman, Gas and Fuel Corporation of Victoria.
- Percy Drummy. For the training of Girl Guides and Queen's Scouts.
- Alan Hubert Tweney, M/T Driver, Chief Secretary and Attorney-General's Department.
- Albert Edward Dawe. For services to ex-servicemen's associations.
- Edward Parry Taylor. For services to ex-servicemen's associations.

State of Western Australia

- Stella Kathleen Rowley, JP. For services to Nursing especially as a Silver Chain Nurse.
- Gladys Agnes Newton. For services to the Slow-Learning Children's Group of Western Australia.

=== Queen's Police Medal (QPM) ===
England and Wales

- Sir Charles Carnegie Martin, CBE, lately Her Majesty's Inspector of Constabulary.
- Leonard Massey, MBE, Chief Constable, Stockport Borough Police.
- Jack Aston, Chief Constable, Barrow-in Furness Borough Police.
- John Arthur Hallett, Chief Constable, Gateshead Borough Police.
- Edwin Solomon, Deputy Chief Constable, West Midlands Constabulary.
- Clifford Lodge, District Co-ordinator, No. 3 District Regional Crime Squad.
- Enc Samuel Turton, lately Superintendent, Bedfordshire and Luton Constabulary.
- Leonard Woolner, Superintendent, Metropolitan Police.
- William James Ward, Superintendent, Yorkshire, North Riding Constabulary.
- Vincent Ellis Ambrose Coventry, Superintendent, Metropolitan Police.
- Edwin John Town, lately Superintendent, Metropolitan Police.
- Arthur Gordon Rose, Superintendent, Manchester City Police.

Scotland

- James Simpson Beattie, Chief Superintendent, Edinburgh City Police.
- William Muncie, Superintendent, Lanarkshire Constabulary.

Northern Ireland

- Thomas James Mains, Head Constable, Royal Ulster Constabulary.

State of Queensland

- Harry Gilbert Cook, Inspector, Queensland Police Force.
- William Ivor Clarke, Inspector, Queensland Police Force.
- Hugh Costello, Inspector, Queensland Police Force.
- Wilhelm Herman Raetz, Inspector, Queensland Police Force.
- Bernard Stuart Brown-Beresford, Inspector, Queensland Police Force.
- Alexander William Berghoffer, Inspector, Queensland Police Force.

State of South Australia

- Mervyn Northwood, Inspector, 1st Class, South Australia Police Force.
- Philip Redney Giles, Inspector, 1st Class, South Australia Police Force.

Overseas Territories

- Frederick Cannon, MVO, Chief of Police, Royal St. Lucia Police Force.
- John Fowlie, Assistant Commissioner, Swaziland Police Force.
- Thomas Hamilton, Senior Superintendent, Fiji Police Force.
- Harry Montgomery Saunders, Chief Superintendent, Bermuda Police Force.
- John Henry Lynch-Wade, MVO, Chief of Police, Royal St. Christopher-Nevis-Anguilla Police Force.

=== Queen's Fire Services Medal (QFSM) ===
England and Wales

- Albert Leese, Chief Fire Officer, Coventry Fire Brigade.
- Ernest Allday, Divisional Officer, Grade I, London Fire Brigade.
- James Butler McTernan, Divisional Officer, Grade I, London Fire Brigade.
- George Haley Lister, Chief Fire Officer, Kingston-upon-Hull Fire Brigade.
- John Hampden Fordham, CBE, lately Chief Fire Officer, Kent Fire Brigade.

State of New South Wales

- Allan Percival Clarke, Captain, New South Wales Fire Brigade.
- Harold Norman Clay, Inspector, New South Wales Fire Brigade.
- Robert Samuel Clayton, Captain, New South Wales Fire Brigade.
- Vivian Alexander Lowther, Deputy Chief Officer, New South Wales Fire Brigade.
- Jack Elliott Meeve, Deputy Chief Officer, New South Wales Fire Brigade.
- Harold George John Merchant, Captain, New South Wales Fire Brigade.

=== Colonial Police Medal (CPM) ===
Basutoland

- Michael Robin Foster, Senior Superintendent, Basutoland Police Force.
- Gordon Campbell Taylor, Senior Superintendent, Basutoland Police Force.

Overseas Territories

- Etienne Alphonse, Station Sergeant, Royal St. Lucia Police Force.
- Chung Cheung-yau, Staff Sergeant Class II, Hong Kong Police Force.
- Leroy Maxwell Clark, Chief Inspector, Bermuda Police Force.
- Makanlall Dindoyal, Superintendent, Mauritius Police Force.
- John Duffy, Chief Inspector, Hong Kong Police Force.
- Tymon William Aloysius Forsyth, Deputy Superintendent, Royal Grenada Police Force.
- Pierre Michel Serge Guillemin, Superintendent, Mauritius Police Force.
- Michael Clafton Illingworth, Senior Superintendent, Hong Kong Police Force.
- Ip Hing-cheung, lately Fire Officer Class II, Fire Services, Hong Kong.
- Kenneth Foster Ishmael, Assistant Superintendent, Special Reserve, Royal St. Lucia Police Force.
- Leung Shun-yiu, Fire Officer Class I, Fire Services, Hong Kong.
- Percy Lowe, Senior Superintendent, Hong Kong Police Force.
- James McMaster, Inspector, Bermuda Police Force.
- John Martin Martineau, Inspector, Royal St. Christopher-Nevis-Anguilla Police Force.
- John Roe O'Meara, Senior Inspector, Hong Kong Police Force.
- Derek John Pearce, Assistant Superintendent, Hong Kong Police Force.
- Alexon Augustus Roberts, Inspector, Royal Antigua-Montserrat-Virgin Islands Police Force.
- Alexander Grainger Rose, Senior Superintendent, Hong Kong Police Force.
- Joseph Marie Lewis Suzor, Superintendent, Mauritius Police Force.
- Sze-To Che-yan, Superintendent, Hong Kong Police Force.
- Wong Kang-chow, Inspector, Hong Kong Auxiliary Police Force.

=== Royal Red Cross (RRC) ===
Army

- Major Margaret O'Hara (353663), Queen Alexandra's Royal Army Nursing Corps.
- Lieutenant-Colonel Hilda Constance Thayer (215662), Queen Alexandra's Royal Army Nursing Corps.

Royal Air Force

- Wing Officer Olwen Cecilia Rees, ARRC (406386), Princess Mary's Royal Air Force Nursing Service.

==== Associate of the Royal Red Cross (ARRC) ====
Royal Navy

- Davina Finlay, Matron, Queen Alexandra's Royal Naval Nursing Service.
- Head Naval Nurse Norah Ida Bennett, 0020, Queen Alexandra's Royal Naval Nursing Service.

Army

- Major Betsy Margaret Mitchell (350894), Queen Alexandra's Royal Army Nursing Corps.
- Major Margaret Jean Patricia Webster (394717), Queen Alexandra's Royal Army Nursing Corps.

Royal Air Force

- Squadron Officer Glenys Mair Davies (405495), Princess Mary's Royal Air Force Nursing Service.

=== Air Force Cross (AFC) ===
Royal Navy

- Lieutenant Commander John David Eagles.

Royal Air Force

- Wing Commander John Richardson, MBE (196473).
- Squadron Leader Edward David Frith (607431).
- Squadron Leader Christopher Charles Golds (3519246).
- Squadron Leader Denis Joseph Lowery (3040523).
- Squadron Leader Clive Charles Rustin (2600804).
- Squadron Leader Peter Klyne Wooldridge, DFC (150922).
- Flight Lieutenant Ralph Clifford Chambers (507014).
- Flight Lieutenant William Vincent Nadin (1684987).
- Flight Lieutenant Henryk Rudolf Ploszek (4160525).
- Flight Lieutenant Ronald William Young (55283).

==== Bar to Air Force Cross ====
- Wing Commander Desmond Lionel Edmonds, AFC (178295).
- Wing Commander Alan Desmond Woodcock, AFC (55275).
- Acting Squadron Leader Raynham George Hanna, AFC (4037254).

=== Queen's Commendation for Valuable Service in the Air ===
Royal Air Force

- Wing Commander Robert Hugh Bennett Dixon (193514).
- Wing Commander James Robert Tanner (196290).
- Acting Wing Commander John Matthias Dobson Sutton (2495415).
- Squadron Leader Cecil Thomas Kingsborough Cody (126010).
- Squadron Leader William Bolton Maish (2548644).
- Squadron Leader Stephen Alfred Edward Newton (583435).
- Flight Lieutenant Andrew McFarlane Adams (57007).
- Flight Lieutenant Michael Adrian Barratt (4041276).
- Flight Lieutenant Peter Philip Bethell (578909).
- Flight Lieutenant Roger Boyce (3521590).
- Flight Lieutenant Brian Reginald Corley (3513265).
- Flight Lieutenant Terence Price Daniel (2519158).
- Flight Lieutenant Donald Currie Ferguson (21511197).
- Flight Lieutenant Waclaw Tadeusz Niezrecki, AFC, DFM (782373).
- Flight Lieutenant Robert Peter O'Brien (608178).
- Flight Lieutenant William Thomas Leslie Rigby (1582320).
- Flight Lieutenant Ronald Walter James Scarlett (174084).
- Flight Lieutenant Ronald George McConnachie Sevewright (4174047). For services with the British Joint Services Training Team, Ghana.
- Flight Lieutenant Reginald James Edward Wareham (574648).
- Flight Lieutenant Albert Maurice Webster (1431215).
- Flight Lieutenant Peter John Wilson (575581).
- Flight Lieutenant William Wilson (164421).
- Flight Lieutenant James Robert Wyld (4070093).
- Flying Officer Norman Henry Mullen (578876).
- Flying Officer Lionel Graham Spinks (3504728).
- Master Pilot Bernard Clinton Kelly (X0935202).
- Master Signaller Cecil Frederick Manning (PI331694).
- Master Engineer Ernest Joseph Clark, DFM (LO576714).

United Kingdom

- Godfrey Lovell Auty. Chief Test Pilot, British Aircraft Corporation (Operating) Ltd. Filton Division, Bristol.
- Leo Charles Evan De Vigne. Test Pilot, Westland Aircraft Ltd. Yeovil.

== Australia ==
=== Knight Bachelor ===
- Nathaniel Bernard Freeman, CBE, of Sydney, New South Wales. For long services to public welfare.
- George Clifton Halliday, MB, FRCS, Senior Surgeon, Royal Prince Alfred Hospital, Sydney, New South Wales. For distinguished medical services.
- John Garling Hurley, CBE, of Sydney, New South Wales. For distinguished services to government, industry and the community.
- Leonard Ross Mallen, OBE, MB, BS, of Adelaide, South Australia. For distinguished services to medicine.
- Philip David Phillips, CMG, MM, QC, lately Chairman, Commonwealth Grants Commission. For services to government, the law and education.
- Frederick Henry Wheeler, CBE, Chairman, Commonwealth Public Service Board. For distinguished public service.

=== Order of the Bath ===
==== Companion of the Order of the Bath (CB) ====
Military Division

- Rear Admiral Thomas Kenneth Morrison, CBE, DSC.

=== Order of Saint Michael and Saint George ===
==== Companion of the Order of St Michael and St George (CMG) ====
- Ralph Victor Allison, of Adelaide, South Australia. For services to Australian manufacturing and the export industry.
- Lewis Edgar Elvey, of Fimiston, Western Australia. For services to the mining industry.
- Geoffrey Harrington Rushworth, Deputy Chairman, Commonwealth Banking Corporation.
- Ian William Wark, CBE, Chairman, Commonwealth Advisory Committee on Advanced Education.

=== Order of the British Empire ===
==== Dame Commander of the Order of the British Empire (DBE) ====
Civil Division

- Mabel Flora Miller, of Hobart, Tasmania. For distinguished public services.

==== Commander of the Order of the British Empire (CBE) ====
Military Division

Royal Australian Navy

- Rear Admiral Gordon John Branstone Crabb, DSC.

Australian Military Forces

- Brigadier Neal Lincoln Currie, OBE. (123), Australian Staff Corps.

Royal Australian Air Force

- Air Commodore Norman Ford, OBE, AFC.

Civil Division

- Wilfred John Brimblecombe, of Pirrinuan, Queensland. For long political and public services.
- Charles William Jackson Falkinder, DSO, DFC, of Hobart, Tasmania. For long political and public services.
- Thomas John Noel Foley, of Sydney, New South Wales. For services to industry.
- Ernest David Gardiner, OBE, Chairman of the Advisory Committee on Standards for Science Facilities in independent secondary schools.
- Bernard William Hartnell, of Sydney, New South Wales. For services to government and to the coal mining industry.
- Norman John Hood, Commonwealth Arbitration Commissioner and Chairman, Australian Stevedoring Industry Authority.
- Edwin John Hook, Secretary, Attorney-General's Department, Canberra.
- The Honourable William James Frederick Riordan, of Brisbane, Queensland. For long political and public services.

==== Officer of the Order of the British Empire (OBE) ====
Military Division

Royal Australian Navy

- The Reverend Grantly Sebastian Lake.

Australian Military Forces

- Colonel David Henry Crompton (3318), Australian Staff Corps.
- Lieutenant-Colonel Murray Frederick Farquhar (2149147), Royal Australian Infantry Corps.
- Lieutenant-Colonel Lisle Gordon Moore (237533), Australian Staff Corps.

Royal Australian Air Force

- Group Captain Alvon Thomas McHutchison.
- Group Captain Richard George Walker.

Civil Division

- William James Frederick Adams, Consultant to the Australian Canned Fruits Board.
- Garry O'Dell Armstrong, Command Secretary, Southern Command, Department of the Army, Victoria.
- Robert Edward Armstrong, First Assistant Secretary, Department of Immigration, Canberra.
- William John Austen, of Dover Heights, New South Wales. For services to industry and export.
- Neil Fernandez Benjamin, MB, ChM, of Northwood, New South Wales. For services to bowls and the community.
- Helen Frances Blaxland, of Sydney, New South Wales. For services to the Red Cross and other charitable organisations.
- Henrietta Frances York Drake-Brockman, of Perth, Western Australia. For services to Australian literature.
- Professor Edward Ridley Bryan, Chairman of the Commonwealth Literature Censorship Board.
- Thomas Hampton Coates, Headmaster, Wesley College, Melbourne, Victoria.
- Gordon Stirling Colvin, MB, BS, President, Federal Council of the Australian Physiotherapy Association.
- Edith Janet Allen Mayo, National President, War Widows' Guild of Australia.
- Frederick James Needham. For services to the community in Norfolk Island.
- Clause William Nielson, Director of Commercial Services, Qantas. For services to international aviation.
- Gilbert Paul Phillips, Deputy Secretary, Department of Trade and Industry, Canberra.
- Jack Maxwell Rayner, Director, Bureau of Mineral Resources, Geology and Geophysics, Canberra.
- George Muir Redshaw, MB, BS, Deputy Director-General, Department of Health, Canberra.
- Ivy Victoria Rentoul, formerly National President, Young Women's Christian Association of Australia.
- Charles Landers Ryan. For services to the public and civil life of Whyalla and the Eyre Peninsula.
- Kenneth Frederick Skues, Dental Consultant, Repatriation Department, Victoria.
- Harry Arthur Stone, Chairman, Australian Dairy Industry Council.
- Alfred Herbert Wicks, Second Commissioner of Taxation, Canberra.

==== Member of the Order of the British Empire (MBE) ====
Military Division

Royal Australian Navy

- Electrical Lieutenant Commander Aubrey Lenard King.
- Engineer Lieutenant (ME) Cecil Lesley Morris Shepperd, DSM, Royal Australian Naval Volunteer Reserve.

Australian Military Forces

- 27499 Warrant Officer Class II Francis Llewellyn Bryant, Royal Australian Survey Corps.
- Captain Edith Alice Down (F174), Women's Royal Australian Army Corps.
- Major Frank Key, ED (355293), Royal Regiment of Australian Artillery.
- 34567 Warrant Officer Class I Raymond Francis Lees, Royal Australian Signals.
- 11788 Warrant Officer Class I Edwin Thomas Selby, Royal Australian Infantry Corps.
- 21116 Warrant Officer Class I Arthur George Stanley, MM, Royal Australian Infantry Corps.
- Captain (temporary) John Grant Taylor (13070), Royal Australian Engineers.

Royal Australian Air Force

- Flight Lieutenant Bruce Victor Tipping (035364).
- Flight Lieutenant Lionel Thomas Cooper West (041923).
- Warrant Officer Ronald Ellis Chaffey, BEM (A2317).

Civil Division

- David Stanford Adamson, of Dirnaseer, New South Wales. For services to ex-servicemen.
- Jimmy Ah Toy, of Pine Creek, Northern Territory. For community services.
- Mary Wilson Alder, of Lane Cove, New South Wales. For services to the community, especially in connection with the Australian Red Cross Society.
- Olive Allitt, of Sydney, New South Wales. For services to the community, especially as Women's Social Services Secretary, Salvation Army.
- John Herbert Avery, Engineering Facilities Controller, Qantas. For services to civil aviation.
- Frances Alice Bateman, Chairman, Victoria League, Queensland.
- Sydney William George Bennett, Superintendent, Route Stations Engineering, Qantas. For services to civil aviation.
- John Herbert Bibo, of Strathmore, Victoria. For services to safety in aviation.
- William Alexander Bishop, of Bunnan, New South Wales. For services to the community.
- Catherine Mary Bolton, of Strathfield, New South Wales. For community services.
- Mary Magdalene Bowers, of Queanbeyan, New South Wales. For community services.
- Monsignor Leslie Oswald Carroll, of Sydney, New South Wales. For church and community services.
- Donald Sydney Clues, Assistant Secretary, Department of Defence, Canberra.
- Wilfred John Cornish, of Claremont, Western Australia. For services to migrants.
- Beatrice Deloitte Davis (Mrs. F. J. Bridges), of Folly Point, New South Wales. For services to literature.
- The Reverend Brother Thomas Bernard Garvey, of Melbourne, Victoria. For long services to education.
- Irene Ellen Alice Gearon, Secretary to the Official Secretary, Australian High Commission, London.
- Rex Roy Giles, of Campbelltown, New South Wales. For services in South Vietnam on a Colombo Plan Project.
- Herbert Frank Ginn, of Hobart, Tasmania. For services under the Colombo Plan in Indonesia.
- Tabitha Lucretia Graham, of Sydney, New South Wales. For community services.
- John Charles Hargrave, MB, BS, of Darwin, Northern Territory. For services to the East Arm Leprosarium.
- Edwin Royce Harvey, Assistant Director-General, Department of Works, Victoria.
- Henry Jacobs, JP, of Newtown, Victoria. For services to the community.
- Councillor Walter Milton Johnson, of Corowa, New South Wales. For services to the community.
- Morva Kekwick, Matron-in-Charge, St. Agnus Home for Girls, Papua.
- Ellen Sarah Kettle, of Darwin, Northern Territory. For services to the health of aboriginal children.
- Robert August William Klein, MB, BS, Director, Central Development Unit, Repatriation Department, Victoria.
- Nancy Lorna Leebold, of Sydney, New South Wales. For services to civil aviation.
- Victor St. George Magnusson, of Box Hill, Victoria. For public services.
- Ida Menzies, of Sydney, New South Wales. For church and community services.
- Robert Theodore Moore, of Beaumaris, Victoria. For services as Federal President, Australian Postmasters' Association.
- Charles Mallet Morley, of Canterbury, Victoria. For services to Australian hockey.
- Wing Commander Charles Gordon Chaloner Olive, DFC, of Brisbane, Queensland. For services to the welfare of youth in Queensland.
- Geoffrey John Price, of Canberra. For public services.
- Thelma May Price, of Port Moresby, Papua. For services to the welfare of the people of Papua.
- Keith John Townsend Robey, President, Association of Commercial Flying Organisations.
- Councillor James Ronan, of Tallangatta, Victoria. For community services.
- Gerard Irvine Ruffels, of West Ryde, New South Wales. For services to ex-servicemen.
- Councillor James Matthew Smith, of Urana, New South Wales. For services to the community.
- Margaret Jean Smith, of Perth, Western Australia. For services in sporting and international spheres.
- Leonard John Strom, Production Manager, Garden Island Dockyard. For public services.
- Bessie Avarinah Thomas, of Bexley, New South Wales. For services to the community.
- Dawn Ware, of Sydney, New South Wales. For services in sporting and international spheres.
- Peter John Raymond Watson, of Waverley, New South Wales. For services to education.
- Alderman Cyril Wellingham, of Temora, New South Wales. For services to the community.
- Hazel Ann Whiddon, of French's Forest, New South Wales. For services to the care of the intellectually disabled.
- Charles John Henry Williamson, of Nailsworth, South Australia. For community services.
- Pastor Alfred Freund Zinnbauer, of St. Peters, South Australia. For services to migrants.

=== Companion of the Imperial Service Order (ISO) ===
- Walter Anthony Dwyer, Superintending Meteorologist, Department of the Interior, Victoria.
- Leslie Allan Fincher, formerly Deputy Assistant Director-General, Postmaster-General's Department, Victoria.
- Clive William Graham, formerly Commissioner, Northern Territory Police Force.
- Joseph Ambrose Heath, Chief Mechanical Engineer, Commonwealth Railways.
- John McCann, Branch Secretary, Master General of Ordnance, Department of the Army, Victoria.
- George Roy McCarter, Deputy Commissioner of Taxation, Western Australia.
- Eric John Mills, Deputy Crown Solicitor, South Australia.

=== British Empire Medal (BEM) ===
Military Division

Royal Australian Navy

- Petty Officer (Acting) Engineering Mechanic William John Robinson, R.55260.
- Chief Petty Officer Instructor John Owen Wright, Australian Sea Cadet Corps.

Australian Military Forces

- 24996 Sergeant George Graham Chevalley, Royal Australian Infantry Corps.
- 29985 Corporal Ivor James Davies, Royal Australian Army Medical Corps.
- 34861 Corporal Gerald Francis Hamilton, Australian Army Catering Corps.
- 33415 Staff Sergeant John Douglas Smith, Royal Australian Signals.
- 310794 Sergeant Raymond Smith, Royal Australian Signals.
- 2273788 Sergeant David Lawrence Tomkins, Royal Australian Infantry Corps.

Royal Australian Air Force

- A4275 Flight Sergeant Owen Carl Thiele.
- A32149 Flight Sergeant John Linton Watkins.
- A5394 Sergeant Douglas Henry Mason.
- A310814 Corporal Ian Jeffery Desmond Fairley.

Civil Division

- Hugh Hamilton Bartholomeusz. For services to the community of Canberra and to the Boy Scouts' Association.
- Elizabeth Sarah Beal. For services to the community of Wingham, New South Wales.
- Phyllis May Carpenter. For services to the Church and to the community of Ryde, New South Wales.
- Frederick Auguste Meylan Cellier, Senior Technical Officer, Grade 2, Postmaster-General's Department, Magill, South Australia.
- Betty Clarke. For community services in Corowa, New South Wales.
- Anne Curr. For services to the community in Trundle, New South Wales.
- George Thomas Edwards, Leading Hand Car Driver, Department of the Interior, Canberra.
- John Robertson Hawke. For services to ex-servicemen and to the community of Albion Park, New South Wales.
- Violet Fanny Hopkins, Overseer, Postmaster-General's Department, Hobart, Tasmania.
- Elizabeth May Lindsay, Postmistress of Huntingdon, New South Wales.
- Bruce Maurer. For services to the community of Milson's Point, New South Wales.
- Lillian Grace Neville. For services to the community of Eastwood, New South Wales.
- Mary Rhine Erin Schell. For services to the community of Liverpool, New South Wales.
- Constance Sarah Walsh, Supervisor, Postmaster-General's Department, Nundah, Queensland.

=== Royal Red Cross (RRC) ===
==== Associate of the Royal Red Cross (ARRC) ====
- Captain Hettie Mary Mills (F21007), Royal Australian Army Nursing Corps.

=== Air Force Cross (AFC) ===
Royal Australian Air Force

- Wing Commander Cedric George Thomas, DFC (011384).
- Flight Lieutenant Victor George Barkell (022187).

=== Queen's Commendation for Valuable Service in the Air ===
Royal Australian Air Force

- Flight Lieutenant Richard John Bomball (0313263).
- Flight Lieutenant Ashley Walter Clarke (035082).
- Flight Lieutenant Darrell Lyn Dunstan (014389).
- Flight Lieutenant Peter Maxwell Grigg (0216202).
- Flight Lieutenant William Robert Holland (015706).
- A217629 Corporal Kenneth Arthur Pratt.

== Sierra Leone ==
=== Order of Saint Michael and Saint George ===
==== Companion of the Order of St Michael and St George (CMG) ====
- The Honourable Banja Tejan-Sie, Speaker, House of Representatives.

=== Order of the British Empire ===
==== Commander of the Order of the British Empire (CBE) ====
Civil Division

- Ali Dausy Wurie, MBE, Resident Director, Sierra Leone Development Company.

==== Officer of the Order of the British Empire (OBE) ====
Civil Division

- Christine Elisabeth Cooper, MB, BCh. For valuable services as a consultant paediatrician.
- George McCavish, Headmaster, Services Children's School, Freetown.
- Paramount Chief Fasuluku Sonsiama, MBE, Kayima, Sando Chiefdom.
- John Leonard Wilkinson, FRCS, LRCP. For valuable services to the Nixon Memorial Hospital.

==== Member of the Order of the British Empire (MBE) ====
Military Division

- Lieutenant (Quartermaster) Lawrence Musa Bameh, Royal Sierra Leone Military Forces.

Civil Division

- Edmond Aboud. For services to industrial relations, scouting and charitable organisations.
- Elizabeth Essie Curney-Barnes. For services to nursing and the community.
- Albert Sandy Demby, JP, Chiefdom Speaker, Baoma Chiefdom, Bo District.
- Mohammed Mare Kamara, JP. For services to the Provincial Administration, particularly as a member of the Public Service Commission.
- Paramount Chief Bai Sherbro Sheka Beilay Komkanda II, Mahera, Kaffu Bullom, Port Loko District.
- Paramount Chief Vandi Pabai II, Sorobema Chiefdom, Pujehun District.

=== British Empire Medal (BEM) ===
Civil Division

- Alfred Koroma, Acting Superintendent of Police, Sierra Leone Police Force.
- Mohamed Baimba Kamara, Information Agent, District Office, Pujehun.

=== Queen's Police Medal (QPM) ===
- Ross Alexander Irvine Nicolson, Deputy Commissioner, Sierra Leone Police Force.

== Jamaica ==
=== Order of Saint Michael and Saint George ===
==== Companion of the Order of St Michael and St George (CMG) ====
- Alfred Gordon Langdon, CVO, Commissioner of Police, Jamaica Constabulary Force.

=== Order of the British Empire ===
==== Knight Commander of the Order of the British Empire (KBE) ====
Civil Division

- Herbert George deLome Macdonald, OBE, President of the Organising Committee of the Eighth British Empire and Commonwealth Games.
- Phillip Manderson Sherlock, CBE, Vice-Chancellor of the University of the West Indies.

==== Commander of the Order of the British Empire (CBE) ====
Civil Division

- Arthur George Abrahams, Director of Organisation of the Eighth British Empire and Commonwealth Games.
- Samuel Philip Cohen Henriques. For community and charitable welfare services.

==== Officer of the Order of the British Empire (OBE) ====
Civil Division

- Roydel Anthony Bridge. For services to sport, particularly as a member of the Organising Committee of the Eighth British Empire and Commonwealth Games.
- Ronald Aliston Irvine, MB, ChB. For public services, particularly in the field of medicine.
- Ivan Eric Rudolph Parris, MD. For public services, particularly in the fields of medicine and social welfare.
- Alva Pagiel Ramsay, Chairman, Press Publicity and Public Relations Committee of the Eighth British Empire and Commonwealth Games.

==== Member of the Order of the British Empire (MBE) ====
Military Division

- Warrant Officer Class I Reginald Stuart Jordan, The Jamaica Regiment.
- Major Hurlstone St. Clair Whitehorne, The Jamaica Regiment (National Reserve).

Civil Division

- Leon Hugh Mcllvane Brown, Senior Surveyor of Customs.
- Francis Joseph Coyne, Deputy Director of Organisation, Eighth British Empire and Commonwealth Games.
- Hennis Hopeton Dawkins, Senior Superintendent of Police.

=== Companion of the Imperial Service Order (ISO) ===
- Frederick Howard Foster, lately Under-secretary, Ministry of Finance.

=== British Empire Medal (BEM) ===
Civil Division

- George Cuthbert Gollop, Chief Draughtsman, Jamaica Force Engineer Unit.

=== Queen's Police Medal (QPM) ===
- William Neil Smart, Superintendent, Jamaica Constabulary Force.

== Gambia ==
=== Knight Bachelor ===
- The Honourable Joseph Angus Lucien Wiseham, Chief Justice of the Gambia.

=== Order of the British Empire ===
==== Commander of the Order of the British Empire (CBE) ====
Civil Division

- Horace Reginald Monday, OBE, JP, Chairman, Public Service Commission.

=== British Empire Medal (BEM) ===
Civil Division

- Seyfu Alhaji Abu Khan, Seyfu of Jokadu District, Lower River Division.
- Abdoulie M'Bye, Inspector of Police, Gambia Police Force.

== Guyana ==
=== Order of Saint Michael and Saint George ===
==== Companion of the Order of St Michael and St George (CMG) ====
- Evan Stanwell Drayton, Permanent Secretary, Ministry of Works and Hydraulics.

=== Order of the British Empire ===
==== Officer of the Order of the British Empire (OBE) ====
Civil Division

- John Reginald Hill, Comptroller of Customs and Excise.
- Eric Sievewright Stoby, Chairman, Rice Marketing Board.

==== Member of the Order of the British Empire (MBE) ====
Civil Division

- Waddell Alexander Bart. For services to local government for many years.
- Duncan Dow, JP, Town Clerk, New Amsterdam.
- Enid Sheila Forde. For social welfare services, particularly in the development of Women's Institutes.
- James Eleazar Ferdinand, Senior Forest Inspector.
- Mohabeer. For services to the rice industry and local government.
- Hamid Rahaman. For public services, particularly to local government and the rice industry.
- Robert Nathaniel Wallace. For public services, especially in the field of education.
