= Thomas Wilson (composer) =

Scottish composer (1927–2001)

Thomas Wilson CBE, FRSE
- Born: Thomas Brendan Wilson; 10 October 1927; Trinidad, Colorado, U.S.
- Died: 12 June 2001 (aged 73); Scotland, United Kingdom
- Education: University of Glasgow (BA, DMus)
- Occupation: Composer

Thomas Wilson CBE FRSE (10 October 1927 – 12 June 2001) was an American-born Scottish composer, a key figure in the revival of interest in Scottish classical music after the second world war.

== Early life and education ==
Thomas Brendan Wilson was born in Trinidad, Colorado to British parents and moved to Britain with his family when he was 17 months old.

The family settled in the Glasgow, Scotland area where (aside from three years in France) he lived and worked for the remainder of his life. Wilson was educated in Glasgow before taking an undergraduate course at St. Mary's College, Aberdeen. He then studied music at the University of Glasgow (1948-1953) with Ernest Bullock and Frederick Rimmer, where he continued as a postgraduate.

He served in the Royal Air Force from 1945 to 1948.

== Career ==
One of the first honours graduates in music from Glasgow University, Wilson became a lecturer there in 1957. He was later appointed a Reader (1971) and given a Personal Chair in 1977. He consistently played an active part in the musical life of the UK, holding executive and advisory positions in such organisations as the Scottish Arts Council, The New Music Group of Scotland, The Society for the Promotion of New Music, The Composers' Guild of Great Britain (chairman 1986–89) now the British Association of Composers and Songwriters, and The Scottish Society of Composers (of which he was a founder member).

His music has been played all over the world and embraces all forms - orchestral, choral-orchestral, chamber-orchestral, opera, ballet, brass band, vocal music of different kinds, and works for a wide variety of chamber ensembles and solo instruments. Wilson completed five symphonies, the fourth of which, Passeleth Tapestry, was premiered by the Royal Scottish National Orchestra under Bryden Thomson on 6 August 1988 in Paisley Abbey. He also completed four concertos - for piano (1985), viola (1987), violin (1993, a one movement elegy in memory of Bryden Thomson) and guitar (1996) - and large scale choral works, such as Sequentiae Passionis (1971) for chorus and orchestra, and Confitemini Domino (1993), commissioned by the Royal College of Organists and premiered in St Paul's Cathedral. His largest work was an opera, Confessions of a Justified Sinner (1972–75), commissioned by Scottish Opera and based on the novel by James Hogg.

The chamber and instrumental compositions include four string quartets. The prize winning Third in 1958 is a three movement work, expressionist in tone and with the emphasis on counterpoint and organic development. The Fourth Quartet (1978) is a further example of his interest in single movement form (like the later orchestral piece Introit and the Violin Concerto). His first fully serial work was the 1961 Violin Sonata, and a free treatment of 12 tone techniques is a feature of his later pieces. There are also vocal chamber music settings, such as the 1983 song cycle The Willow Branches: Seven Songs from the Chinese, for soloists and chamber ensemble or piano. The six part piano piece Incunabula (1983) was composed for Richard Deering, who premiered it in 1984. Some of the music is used again in the Piano Concerto the following year.

Wilson was awarded the CBE in 1990. The following year he was awarded an honorary DMus Degree from Glasgow University and created a Fellow of the Royal Scottish Academy of Music and Drama. He was also elected a Fellow of the Royal Society of Edinburgh.

He died at the age of 73 in June 2001. The 80th anniversary of Wilson's birth on 10 October 1927 was marked by a concert featuring one of the composer's most performed works, the St Kentigern Suite for string orchestra, on 17 January 2008 by the RSAMD Chamber Orchestra, and by a performance of the composer's Violin Concerto also in January 2008 by the National Youth Orchestra of Scotland.

== Works ==
=== Orchestral ===
- Symphony No. 1 (1955) (withdrawn)
- Toccata for orchestra (1959)
- Variations for orchestra (1960)
- Pas De Quoi (1964) Six little dances for strings.
- Symphony No. 2 (1965)
- Concerto for orchestra (1967)
- Touchstone (1967) Commissioned by the BBC for the Sir Henry Wood Promenade Concerts.
- Threnody (1970) music was taken from Wilson's opera "The Charcoal Burner".
- Ritornelli Per Archi (1972) Commissioned for the Edinburgh Festival by the Scottish Baroque Ensemble.
- Symphony No. 3 (1979) Commissioned by Musica Nova.
- Mosaics (1981) Commissioned for Cantilena by Radio Clyde.
- Introit (1982) Commissioned by BBC.
- Piano Concerto (1985) Commissioned by Bryden Thomson for David Wilde and the BBC Philharmonic Orchestra.
- St Kentigern Suite (1986) Commissioned by The Friends of Glasgow Cathedral.
- Viola Concerto (1987) Commissioned by James Durrant with assistance from the BBCSSO Trust.
- Symphony No. 4, Passeleth Tapestry (1988; numbered as a symphony 1996) Commissioned by Renfrew District Council together with Strathclyde Regional Council to mark Paisley's 500th anniversary as a Burgh of Barony.
- Carillon (1990) Commissioned by Glasgow city council in 1990 as part of its European City of Culture celebrations, as the inaugural work to celebrate the opening of the city's new Royal Concert Hall.
- Violin Concerto (1993) Commissioned by the National Youth Orchestra of Scotland and BP for Ernst Kovacic.
- Guitar Concerto (1996) Commissioned by Phillip Thorne.
- Symphony No. 5 (1998) Commissioned by the Scottish Chamber Orchestra.

=== Choral ===
- Ave Maria/Pater Noster (1967)
- Night Songs (1967) Commissioned by the John Currie Singers
- Missa Pro Mundo Conturbato (1970) Commissioned by the John Currie Singers.
- Te Deum (1971) Large Chorus. Commissioned by the Edinburgh Festival for the opening concert on the occasion of its 25th anniversary.
- Sequentiae Passions (1971) Large Chamber Choir. Commissioned by Musica Nova.
- Ubi Caritas et Amor (1976) Commissioned by the Baccholian Singers for the City of London Festival.
- Songs of Hope and Expectation (1977) Chamber Choir Commissioned by the John Currie Singers.
- Amor Christi (1989) Chamber Choir. Commissioned the Scottish Philharmonic Singers.
- Cantigas Para Semana Santa (1992) Commissioned by Cappella Nova
- Confitemini Domino (1993) Commissioned by the Royal College of Organists to celebrate their 100th Anniversary

A cappella masses

- St. Augustine (1955)
- Mass in Polyphonic Style (1960)
- Missa Brevis (1960)
- Mass based on a Bach Chorale(1961)

=== Operas ===
- The Charcoal Burner, opera in one act with eight characters, to a libretto by Edwin Morgan (1968), commissioned by the BBC
- The Confessions of a Justified Sinner (1975), opera in three acts with three main characters plus chorus to a libretto by John Currie (based on the novel The Private Memoirs and Confessions of a Justified Sinner by James Hogg), commissioned by Scottish Opera

=== Ballet ===
- Embers of Glencoe (1973), commissioned by Scottish Ballet

=== Brass band ===
- Sinfonietta (1967) Commissioned by the Scottish Amateur Music Association for the National Youth Brass Band of Scotland.
- Cartoon for Cornet (1969) Commissioned by Robert Oughton and the Scottish CWS Band.
- Refrains and Cadenzas (1973) Commissioned by the Cheltenham Festival and used as the test piece for the European Championships in 1984.

=== Vocal ===
- By The Waters of Babylon (1951), a capella setting of Psalm 137
- Three Orkney Songs for soprano/baritone and quintet (1961), commissioned by the BBC.
- Six Scots Songs for voice and piano (1962), commissioned by the Baccholian Singers for the City of London Festival
- Carmina Sacra (1964), orchestral or voice and keyboard.
- My Soul Longs for Thee, SSA and organ (1967)
- Night Songs (1967), a capella, commissioned by the John Currie Singers
- One Foot in Eden, orchestral or voice and piano (1977), commissioned by Josephine Nendick
- The Willow Branches – Seven Songs from the Chinese, orchestral or voice and piano (1983), commissioned by Marilyn de Blieck

=== Carols ===
- A Babe is Born (1967)
- There Is No Rose (1974)

=== Chamber ===
- String Quartet No. 2 (1954)
- String Quartet No. 3 (1958), McEwen Composition Prize
- Violin Sonata (1961), commissioned by the University of Glasgow
- Sonatina for clarinet and piano (1962)
- Concerto Da Camera (1965), commissioned by Bernicia Ensemble
- Pas De Quoi, Six little dances for strings (1965)
- Piano Trio (1966), commissioned by the Scottish Trio
- Sinfonia for Seven Instruments (1968), commissioned by the University of Glasgow
- Cello Sonata (1971), commissioned by Glasgow Chamber Music Society
- Canti Notturni (1972), commissioned by the Clarina Ensemble
- Ritornelli Per Archi (1972), commissioned by the Scottish Baroque Ensemble for the Edinburgh Festival
- Complementi (1973), commissioned by Clarina Ensemble
- String Quartet No. 4 (1978), commissioned by the Edinburgh String Quartet
- Mosaics (1981), commissioned for Cantilena by Radio Clyde
- Chamber Concerto (1985), commissioned by the New Music Group of Scotland
- St Kentigern Suite (1986), commissioned by the Friends of Glasgow Cathedral, on the occasion of the cathedral's 850th anniversary
- Chamber Symphony (1990), commissioned by Paragon Ensemble and Glasgow District Council as part of the celebrations during Glasgow's reign as European City of Culture 1990
- Threads (1996), commissioned by Duo Contemporain
- Sunset Song (2011), arranged by Kenny Letham from incidental music originally commissioned by the BBC

=== Instrumental ===
- Sonatina for piano (1956)
- Piano Sonata (1964)
- Three Pieces - Reverie, Tzigane, Valse Viennoise (1964) For Piano. Later arranged for two guitars.
- Fantasia for cello (1964)
- Soliloquy (1969) For Guitar. Commissioned by Glasgow Master Concerts for Julian Bream.
- Three Pieces for guitar (1971)
- Coplas Del Ruisenor for guitar (1972), commissioned by Angelo Gilardino.
- Cancion for guitar (1982)
- Incunabula for piano (1983)
- Dream Music for guitar (1983), commissioned by Phillip Thorne.
- Toccata Festevole for organ (1991), commissioned by the Paisley International Organ Festival
- Chanson De Geste for solo horn (1991), commissioned by Redcliffe Concerts

=== Other ===
- The Face of Love (1954) Commissioned by BBC Radio
- Witchwood (1954) Commissioned by BBC Radio
- Glencoe (1955) Commissioned by BBC Radio
- Susannah and the Elders (1955) Commissioned by BBC Radio
- Storm (1956) Commissioned by BBC Radio
- Oggs Log (1956) Commissioned by BBC Radio
- All in Good Faith (1957) Commissioned by BBC Radio
- A Nest of Singing Birds (1957) Commissioned by BBC Radio
- The Boy David (1957) Commissioned by BBC Radio
- For Tae Be King (1957) Commissioned by BBC Radio
- The Great Montrose (1958) Commissioned by BBC Radio
- The Wallace (1959) Commissioned by BBC Radio
- Enquiry (1960) Commissioned by BBC Radio
- Brush Off the Dust (1964) Commissioned by BBC Radio
- Checkpoint (1965) Commissioned by BBC Radio
- Charles Rennie Mackintosh (1965) Commissioned by BBCTV
- Robert Burns (1965) Commissioned by BBCTV
- A Season for Mirth (1966) Commissioned by BBC Radio
- A Spell for Green Corn (1967) Commissioned by BBC Radio
- Ships of the '45 (1968) Commissioned by BBC Radio
- The March of the '45 (1969) Commissioned by BBC Radio
- Sunset Song (Part 1 of A Scots Quair) (1971) Commissioned by BBCTV
- The New Road (1973) Commissioned by BBCTV
- There was a Man (1980) Commissioned by Radio Clyde
- Summer Solstice (1980) Commissioned by Radio Clyde
- The House with the Green Shutters (1980) Commissioned by BBC Radio
- Cloud Howe (Part 2 of A Scots Quair) (1982) Commissioned by BBCTV
- Grey Granite (Part 3 of A Scots Quair) (1983) Commissioned by BBCTV
- Voyage of St Brandon (1984) Commissioned by BBCTV
- Murder Not Proven (1984) Commissioned by BBCTV
- Gaudi (N.D.) Commissioned by BBCTV
- The Castle of May (N.D.) Commissioned by BBCTV

== Recordings ==
- Cancion for Guitar (2003) Tuomo Tirronen; MSR Classics MS1214
- Cancion for Guitar (2008) Stefan Grasse; Xolo CD1015
- Cancion for Guitar (2009) Allan Neave; Delphian DCD34079
- Carillon (1990) Royal Scottish National Orchestra (cond. Rory Macdonald); Linn Records CKD 616
- Cartoon (1995) West Lothian Schools Brass Band; Polyphonic Reproductions Ltd. QPRL075D
- Cartoon (1998) Royal Norwegian Navy Band; Doyen Series DOYCD083
- Cartoon (2000) West Lothian Celebrity Winds; 'Celebrations'
- Cello Sonata (1993) Alla Vasilieva & Alexei Smitov; Russian Disc RDCD00680
- Chamber Symphony (1993) Paragon Ensemble; Continuum Ltd. CCD1032
- Complementi (2011) Daniel's Beard; Meridian CDE84607
- Confitemini Domino (2005) Bearsden Choir; Norsound NM-050344
- Coplas del Ruiseñor for Guitar (2008) Stefan Grasse; Xolo CD1015
- Fantasia for 'Cello (1993) Alla Vasilieva; Russian Disc RDCD00680
- Incunabula for Piano (2001) Johannes Wolff; Hastedt Verlag & Musikedition HT5322
- Incunabula for Piano (2009) Simon Smith; Delphian DCD34079
- Incunabula for Piano (2023) Richard Deering; Heritage HTGCD142
- Introit (1988) Scottish National Orchestra; Queensgate Music
- Piano Concerto (1988) Scottish National Orchestra; Queensgate Music
- Piano Sonata (1991) Peter Sievewright; Merlin Records MRFD891706
- Piano Sonata (2001) Johannes Wolff; Hastedt Verlag & Musikedition HT5322
- Piano Sonata (2009) Simon Smith; Delphian DCD34079
- Piano Sonatina (2001) Johannes Wolff; Hastedt Verlag & Musikedition HT5322
- Piano Trio (2009) Delphian DCD34079
- Refrains and Cadenzas (1997) Grimethorp Colliery Band; Chandos Brass CHAN4549
- St Kentigern Suite (1990) Scottish Ensemble; Virgin Classics Ltd. VC7 91112-2 260421-231
- St Kentigern Suite (1996) RSAMD Chamber Orchestra; RSAMD
- String Quartet No. 3 (2009) Edinburgh Quartet; Delphian DCD34079
- Sinfonietta for Brass Band (1997) National Youth Brass Band of Scotland; Amadeus AMSCD027
- Symphony No. 2 (2019) Royal Scottish National Orchestra (cond. Rory Macdonald); Linn Records CKD 643
- Symphony No. 3 (2018) Royal Scottish National Orchestra (cond. Rory Macdonald); Linn Records CKD 616
- Symphony No. 4, Passeleth Tapestry (2018) Royal Scottish National Orchestra (cond. Rory Macdonald); Linn Records CKD 616
- Symphony No. 5 (2019) Royal Scottish National Orchestra (cond. Rory Macdonald); Linn Records CKD 643
- There is no Rose (1998) Cappella Nova; Rota RTCD001
- Three Pieces for Guitar (1997) Allan Neave; BGS Records BGCD104
- Three Pieces for Guitar (2009) Allan Neave; Delphian DCD34079
- Three Pieces for Piano (2001) Johannes Wolff; Hastedt Verlag & Musikedition HT5322
- Violin Concerto (1993) National Youth Orchestra of Scotland; NYOS Records NYOS001
