= Franz Liszt International Piano Competition (Budapest) =

Franz Liszt International Piano Competition in Budapest is a long-standing competition founded by the Office of International Music Competitions in Budapest as one of 17 competitions under the flagship name of "Budapest International Music Competition." The Franz Liszt International Piano Competition debuted in 1933 under the leadership of Ernő Dohnányi of the Franz Liszt Academy of Music, where the competition was held.

== Franz Liszt International Piano Competition (1933–) ==
The Liszt Piano Competition started in 1933, but had a hiatus from 1937 to 1956. The competition takes place in 5-years cycles (1956, 1961, 1966, etc.). In the year 2006, the competition repertoire was from Liszt and Bartók. Year 2011 competition's repertoire was solely of Liszt again – due to Liszt's 200th birth anniversary.

=== Winners ===
Year	First prize	Second prize	Third prize
1933	Annie Fischer	Taras Mikischa	Louis Kentner
1956	Lev Vlasenko	Mihály Bächer	Lazar Berman, Liu Shikun
1961	David Wilde, Gábor Gabos	Dino Ciani	Valentin Belchenko
1966	–	Imre Antal	–
1971	Reiko Matsuzaki, Mykola Suk	Elena Skuratowskaja	László Baranyay, Etsuko Tazaki
1976	Robert Benz	Gary Steigerwalt, Frédéric Aguessy	Imre Rohmann, Vadim Monastyrsky
1981	–	Mūza Rubackytė	Hortense Cartier-Bresson
1986	–	Károly Mocsári	Dmitri Ratser
1991	Alexander Strukov	Leonid Kuzmin, Nohara Midori	Etelka Csuprik, Valery Shkarupa
1996	Gergely Bogányi	Igor Kamenz	Nadejda Vlaeva
2001	–	Péter Tóth	Gábor Farkas, Vadym Kholodenko, Massimiliano Motterle
2006	Elmar Gasanov	Olivier Besnard, László Borbély	István Lajkó
2011	Alexander Ullman	Ilya Kondratiev	János Balázs
2016	Tomoki Sakata	Sergey Belyavskiy	Leon Bernsdorf
2021	Kevin Chen	Giovanni Bertolazzi	Gergely Kovács

Prize winners

- 1956: Valerie Tryon (born 1934)
- 1933: Andor Foldes

Winners, year not known

- Vlastimil Lejsek (1927–2010)

== See also ==
- World Federation of International Music Competitions

== Other piano competitions by the same name ==
- International Franz Liszt Piano Competition, Utrecht, Netherlands (founded in 1986)
- International Franz Liszt Piano Competition, Weimar, Germany
- Franz Liszt Piano Competition, Town Hall, New York City (held only one year, in 1960)
- International Franz Liszt Piano Competition, Mario Zanfi Prize, Parma Conservatoire, Italy (founded 1981, held every four years)
