= Oleh Krysa =

Soviet Ukrainian American violinist

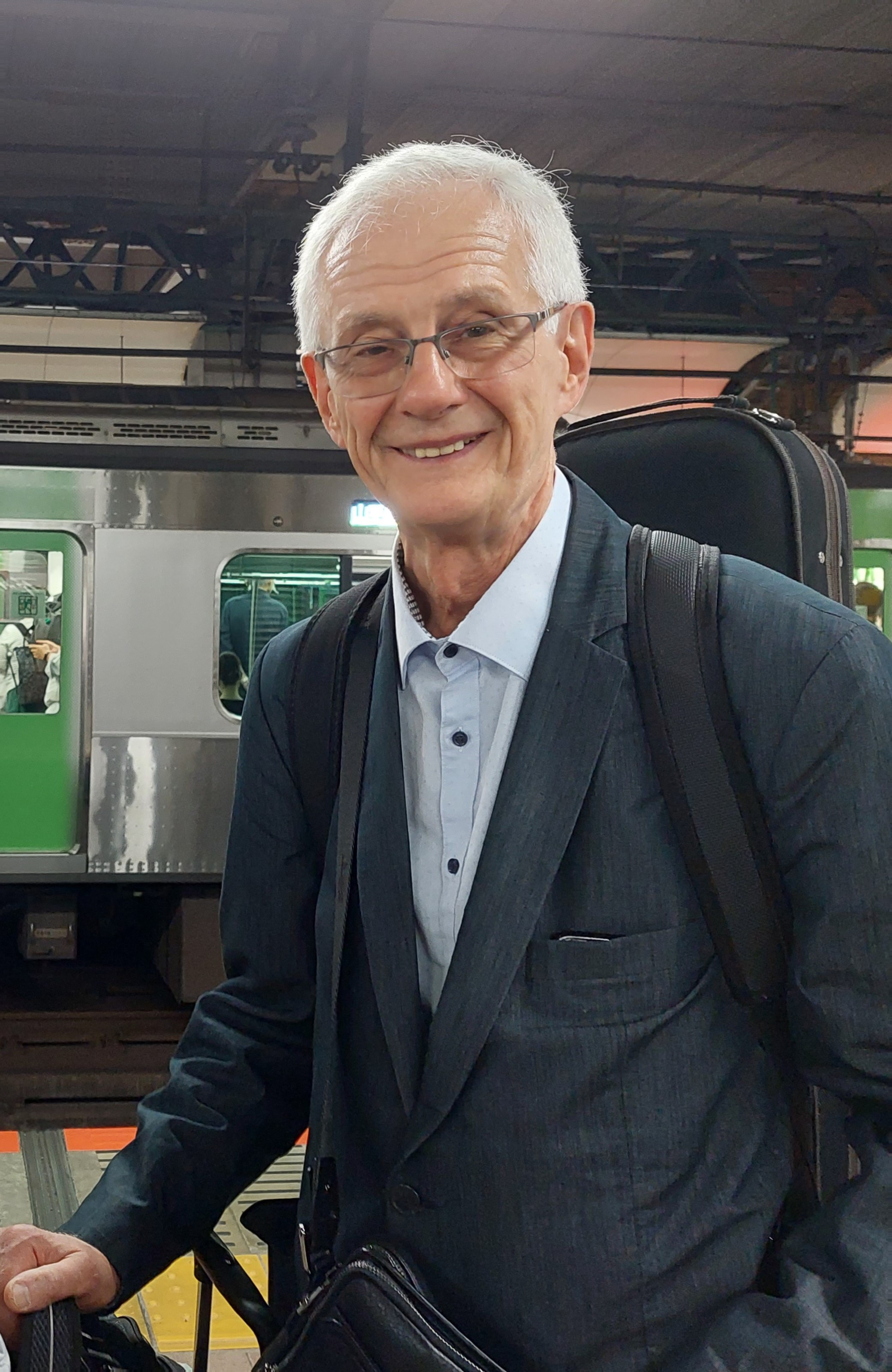

Background information
- Born: June 1, 1942 (age 84); Uchanie, General Government
- Genre: Classical
- Occupations: Violinist, pedagogue
- Instrument: Violin
- Website: Official Web-site

Oleg/Oleh Krysa (Russian: Олег Крыса Ukrainian: Олег Криса; born June 1, 1942) is an American violinist of Ukrainian Origin, Laureate of International Competitions, Honored Artist of Ukrainian SSR(1970), Laureate of Lenin Komsomol Prize(1970), Merited Artist of Ukraine.

== Early life ==
Oleh Krysa was born on 1 June 1942 in Małe Uchanie, near Uchanie in present-day Lublin Voivodeship, Poland, to a Ukrainian family. Before the Second World War, his father, Vasyl Teofilovych Krysa, had lived in Lviv, where he worked in commerce. During the war, the family sought refuge in Uchanie, where Oleh was born. They subsequently returned to Lviv, where he grew up and received his education.

Krysa grew up in a household strongly influenced by Ukrainian folk music. His mother, who came from a family in Volhynia, was an enthusiastic singer and knew hundreds of traditional songs. Although neither parent was a professional musician, both encouraged his musical education. His mother preferred that he study the piano, while his father favoured the violin. The decision was reportedly settled by a coin toss, and Krysa began studying the violin at the age of six.

His first violin teacher at the Lviv Specialized Music School was Konstantin Mikhailov, a pupil of Sergey Korguyev (also known as Serge P. Korgueff), who had studied under and assisted Leopold Auer. Krysa later recalled Mikhailov's demanding teaching methods and credited him with providing a strong foundation for his musical development.

After completing his studies in Lviv in 1960, Krysa entered the Moscow Conservatory, where he studied under David Oistrakh. He graduated in 1965 and completed postgraduate studies under Oistrakh in 1967. Oistrakh praised his student, stating: "Oleh has brilliant natural gifts, unusual musicality, vivid artistry and great charm."

== Career ==
=== Performing ===
In 1967, Krysa began his professional career as a soloist with the Kyiv Philharmonic. From 1970 to 1973, he was the leader of the Kyiv Conservatory Quartet. In 1977, he became the first violinist of the Beethoven Quartet in Moscow, remaining with the ensemble until its dissolution in 1987. He later led the Leontovych String Quartet from 1999 to 2003.

Alongside his chamber music activities, Krysa developed an international career as a soloist, performing with orchestras and giving recitals throughout Europe, North America, Asia and Australia. His appearances have included performances at Carnegie Hall, the Royal Festival Hall, the Concertgebouw, Wigmore Hall and Suntory Hall, as well as major international music festivals.

Krysa has been particularly associated with the performance and promotion of contemporary classical music. He has collaborated with composers including Alfred Schnittke, Valentin Silvestrov, Myroslav Skoryk, Sofia Gubaidulina, Edison Denisov, Krzysztof Penderecki, Virko Baley, Vyacheslav Artyomov, Yevhen Stankovych and Larry Sitsky. Several composers have written works specifically for him or dedicated compositions to him.

His premieres have included Skoryk's Violin Concerto No. 1 (1969), Schnittke's A Paganini for solo violin (1982), String Trio (1983), String Quartet No. 3 (1984) and Concerto Grosso No. 3 (1985). He has also premiered works by Baley, Sitsky, Sydney Hodkinson, Vera Ivanova and Natalia Rozhko.

=== Teaching ===
- 1969—1973 — first Chairman of Violin Department at Kiev Conservatory
- since 1971 — professor at Kiev Conservatory
- since 1973 — professor at Gnessin State Musical College, Moscow
- 1974 — professor at Moscow Conservatory
- since 1989 — professor at Eastman School of Music, Rochester, New York, United States

Oleh Krysa regularly holds master classes at the following locations:

- Canada: Toronto, Montreal
- China: Shenyang
- Germany: Hanover, Freiburg, Hitzacker, Weimar
- Japan: Tokyo, Hamamatsu
- Korea: Seoul
- Poland: Warsaw, Łańcut
- U.S.A.: New York City, Boston, Oberlin, Philadelphia

== Personal life ==
=== Family ===
- Wife: Tatiana Tchekina — pianist (1944-2013)
- Children: Peter — violinist; Taras — violinist and conductor; Andrej Madatov - violinist
- Siblings: Bogdan Krysa — violinist, pedagogue Kyiv Academy of Music; Roman Krysa — electronics engineer, graduate of Lviv Polytechnic

== Recordings ==
Oleh Krysa has recorded about 40 albums for the following labels: Melodya, BIS Records, Triton (Discordia), Lydian, PolyGram-Polska, Troppe Note/Cambria, Russian Disk (USA).

=== Partial discography ===
- Schnittke: Works for Violin and Cello (BIS, 2004)
- Schnittke: Violin Sonatas Nos.3 & 4. (BIS, 2004)
- Prelude in Memoriam Shostakovich (BIS, 2004)
- Ravel/Martinu/Honegger/Schulhoff (BIS, 1998)
- Bloch: Concerto For Violin And Orchestra/Poems Of The Sea/Suite Symphonique (BIS, 1995)
- The Leontovych String Quartet • Shostakovitch/Tchajkovsky (Greystone Records, ASIN: B000FEU70Y)
- Ludwig van Beethoven: The Complete Violin Sonatas, Triton (DML Classics), 1999
  Collaboration with Mykola Suk
