= John Butt (musician) =

English orchestral and choral conductor, organist, harpsichordist and scholar

John Butt OBE FRSE FBA
- Born: 17 November 1960 (age 65); Solihull, England
- Education: King's College, Cambridge
- Occupations: Choral conductor; concert organist; musicologist
- Organizations: University of Aberdeen; University of California, Berkeley; University of Glasgow; Dunedin Consort
- Awards: Gramophone Award

John Butt OBE FRSE FBA (born 17 November 1960) is an English orchestral and choral conductor, organist, harpsichordist and scholar. He holds the Gardiner Chair of Music at the University of Glasgow and is music director of the Dunedin Consort with whom he has made award-winning recordings in historically informed performance. He is a prolific scholar, conductor and performer of works by Johann Sebastian Bach.

== Education and career ==
Butt was born in Solihull, England, and educated at Solihull School on a music scholarship. He was the organist at St Alban the Martyr, Birmingham, from 1977 to 1979. In 1979 he began his undergraduate education at University of Cambridge, where he held the position of organ scholar at King's College from 1979 to 1982. His organ teachers at Cambridge included Peter Hurford and Gillian Weir. He received his PhD at Cambridge in 1987.

After graduation, he lectured at the University of Aberdeen and was a Fellow of Magdalene College at the University of Cambridge. In 1989, he became university organist and assistant professor of music at the University of California, Berkeley; in 1992, he was promoted to associate professor, as well as director of the University Chamber Chorus. He prepared that choir for Gustav Leonhardt to conduct in Bach's Magnificat and the related cantata Meine Seel erhebt den Herren, BWV 10, at the 1992 Berkeley Festival and Exhibition; Butt later said that he had come to know Leonhardt "fairly well" and that "I learned a lot when preparing choirs for him back in my California days." In 1997, he gave what one critic calls "memorable readings" of Handel's organ concertos. as guest organ soloist with the San Francisco Symphony Orchestra and Saint Paul Chamber Orchestra.

In autumn of 1997, Butt returned to the University of Cambridge as University Lecturer, Director of Studies for Music at King's College, and Fellow of King's College. He also became the founding director of King's Voices mixed chorus. Musicians that he inspired during this time include the organist Robert Quinney and harpsichordist and director Julian Perkins.

Since October 2001, Butt has been the Gardiner Chair of Music at the University of Glasgow; he also served as Head of the Music Department from 2001 to 2005. Since 2003 he has conducted the Dunedin Consort, a professional ensemble in Edinburgh for performances in historically informed performance. At the end of the 2013/14 academic session, Butt was also appointed Interim Director of Music of the Glasgow University Chapel Choir, after James Grossmith left that post to become chorus master of the Royal Swedish Opera.

As a guest conductor, Butt has appeared with Philharmonia Baroque Orchestra, the English Concert, the Scottish Chamber Orchestra, the Irish Baroque Orchestra, the Royal Scottish Academy of Music Chamber Orchestra and Chorus, the Orchestra of the Age of Enlightenment, the Aurora Orchestra, the Portland Baroque Orchestra, the Stavanger Symphony Orchestra, the Halle, and orchestras at the Berkeley Early Music Festival and Göttingen International Handel Festival.

== Publications ==
Butt has published numerous articles for scholarly publications and for general-audience publications. Books have included

- Bach Interpretation: Articulation Marks in Primary Sources of J.S.Bach (Cambridge University Press, 1990; the book is based on Butt's doctoral thesis, and is described as the "first comprehensive assessment of J. S. Bach's use of articulation marks (i.e. slurs and dots) in the large body of primary sources." In 1992, the book won the first William H. Scheide Prize of the American Bach Society.)
- Bach – Mass in B Minor (Cambridge Music Handbooks, 1991)
- Music Education and the Art of Performance in the German Baroque (Cambridge University Press, 1994)
- Playing with History – the historical approach to musical performance (Cambridge University Press, 2002; shortlisted for the book prize of the British Academy);
- Bach's Dialogue with Modernity: Perspectives on the Passions (Cambridge University Press, 2010 ISBN 978-0-521-88356-6; the book examines Bach's St. Matthew Passion and St. John Passion in detail, situating them with respect to pre-modernity and modernity, and considering issues they raise with respect to artistic subjectivity, rhetoric and performance practice.)

He co-edited the Cambridge Companion to Bach (1997) – for which he contributed two articles on Bach's metaphysics – was consultant editor for the Oxford Companion to Bach, and joint editor (together with Tim Carter) of the Cambridge History of Seventeenth Century Music (2005).

== Discography ==
As a solo harpsichordist, organist, or clavichordist, Butt made eleven recordings for the Harmonia mundi label, of music by Johann Sebastian Bach, Johann Kuhnau, Johann Pachelbel, Georg Philipp Telemann, Henry Purcell, John Blow, Matthew Locke, Juan Bautista Cabanilles, Girolamo Frescobaldi, and Sir Edward Elgar. In 2004, he recorded Bach's Pastorella for organ, BWV 590, for the Delphian label in Glasgow. In July 2013, using a harpsichord modeled on an original built by Michael Mietke, Butt recorded Bach's The Well-Tempered Clavier for the Linn label; it was released in November 2014.

As a continuo player, Butt has recorded with many ensembles, including the English Chamber Orchestra and American Bach Soloists. In 1991–92, for Harmonia mundi, he and Baroque violinist Elizabeth Blumenstock recorded the Bach sonatas for violin and harpsichord, BWV 1014–19, 1021 and 1023. In 2014, he recorded BWV 1014–19 again, this time with violinist Lucy Russell for the Linn label; it was released in 2015.

Butt's first recording as a conductor, made in 1994 for the Centaur label, featured music of Orlando Gibbons sung by the U.C. Berkeley Chamber Choir with viol accompaniment; for the disc, he also recorded keyboard works of Gibbons on the organ. Since 2005, Butt has conducted recordings of the Dunedin Consort and Players for the Linn label, many featuring reconstructions of a specific historical performance. These include:

- 2006: Handel's Messiah. This was the first recording of a reconstruction of the work in its first performance, which took place in Dublin in 1742. The release won the 2007 Gramophone Award for Best Baroque Vocal Album and the 2008 MIDEM Baroque Award at the Cannes Classical Awards.
- March 2008: Bach's St Matthew Passion. This was the first recording of the version from Bach's final performance, which also took place in 1742.
- November 2008: Handel's Acis and Galatea in the original performing version of 1718. This release was nominated for a Gramophone Award.
- 2010: Bach's Mass in B minor. This is the first recording to use the new critical edition by Joshua Rifkin, which follows Bach's final version of the score from 1748 to 1750 exclusively from beginning to end. (Other editions have included elements from a 1733 version of the Kyrie and Gloria, and some posthumous changes by Bach's son, Carl Philipp Emanuel Bach).
- 2012: Handel's Esther in the first reconstructable version of the work, from 1720; Butt reconstructed the performing edition from Handel's autograph and three other historical sources.
- 2013: Bach's St. John Passion, in a liturgical reconstruction based on Good Friday Vespers services in Leipzig. In March 2013 the disc was named "Record of the Month" by Gramophone and "Recording of the Month" by BBC Music Magazine.
- September 2013: Bach's Brandenburg Concertos with the Dunedin Consort. It was a Gramophone "Choice" in October 2013. and was a finalist in the Baroque Instrumental category for the 2014 Gramophone Awards; it was also nominated for the International Classical Music Awards in the Baroque Instrumental category. In this recording, the ensemble used the pitch standard of A=392 or "tief-Cammerton," a whole tone below the modern standard pitch and associated with the French royal court at the time; Butt notes that many German-speaking courts, including the one at Cöthen where Bach wrote these concertos, "attempted to emulate French practice." He also mentions instruments from the time and place pitched to this standard. Still, he notes that "While Cöthen court pitch was likely to have been somewhere near this, it is unlikely that pitch was ever standardized as precisely as we might often assume or wish."
- March 2014: Mozart's Requiem with the Dunedin Consort. This is the first recording of David Black's new critical edition, published in 2012, of the Franz Xaver Süssmayr completion of the Requiem. The recording seeks to re-create the forces used at the first complete performance in January, 1793; it also includes a performance of Black's reconstruction of a December 1791 performance of the Introit and Kyrie sections. Also performed is Mozart's Misericordias Domini, K. 222. In May 2014, the disc was named "Recording of the Month" by Gramophone. and in August 2014, it won the Gramophone Award for 2014 for Best Choral recording. In November 2014, it was listed among the nominees in the Choral category for the 2015 International Classical Music Awards. In December 2014, it was listed as one of the five nominees for "Best Choral Performance" in the Grammy Awards.
- October, 2015: A musical reconstruction of Bach's first Christmas service in Leipzig, including the Magnificat in E-flat major, BWV 243a, the cantata Christen, ätzet diesen Tag, BWV 63, organ works by Bach (played by Butt), a motet by Giovanni Gabrieli, and period chorales, recorded in July 2014;
- 2014 Bach's Violin Concertos with the group's first violinist, Cecilia Bernardini, as soloist;
- September 2015 Bach's Christmas Oratorio.

== Awards and fellowships ==
In addition to awards for his books and recordings, Butt has won awards and fellowships including:

- 2003: The Dent Medal of the Royal Musical Association
- 2003: election to Fellowship of the Royal Society of Edinburgh.
- 2006: Leverhulme Major Research Fellowship for research on the Bach Passions
- 2006: election to Fellow of the British Academy.
- 2010: Arts and Humanities Research Council
- 2010: Kohn Foundation/Royal Academy of Music Bach Prize for his Bach scholarship and performance.
- 2013: Medal of the Royal College of Organists for "organ playing, organ- and choral-related scholarship, and choral conducting,"
- 2013: Officer of the Order of the British Empire (OBE) in the New Year Honours for services to music in Scotland.

== Personal life ==
John Butt and his wife Sally have five children He is the nephew of a professional musician, and son of the distinguished biochemist Wilfrid Butt – who was, Butt says, "a keen amateur" musician and was at one time a member of the chorus of the London Philharmonic Orchestra. When an interviewer for the Orchestra of the Age of Enlightenment asked John Butt about his preferences, he expressed enthusiasm for the practice of tai chi, the films of Alfred Hitchcock, the symphonies of Anton Bruckner (adding, "I can’t understand why so many people find Bruckner boring"), and the In Search of Lost Time novels of Marcel Proust (the central character, he said, is "a bit of a weed in many respects, but what a complex, detailed and wonderfully ironic weed! No-one else captures so strikingly the paradoxes of consciousness and the little inconsistencies and delusions that we all try to hide from the world"). He also told the interviewer, "I feel that most of the things at which I am successful are only a matter of momentary luck!"

On 17 September 2014 he published a letter in The Herald supporting the "No" position in 2014 Scottish independence referendum, and arguing that independence would damage classical music. He argued that "Classical and contemporary music surely flourish best in a multi-cultural, international, environment, one that is extraordinarily well provided within the UK (and which would be even better if more Scots were to reclaim some of their ownership of it)," decried the "insidious synecdochal reductionism of the independence cause," and concluded, "Such a simplistic attitude suggests that the risks of looking inwards and losing the dynamism of Scotland's own cultures are very real once we begin to live behind the Tartan Curtain."
