= Gardiner Professor of Music =

Gardiner Chair of Music University of Glasgow
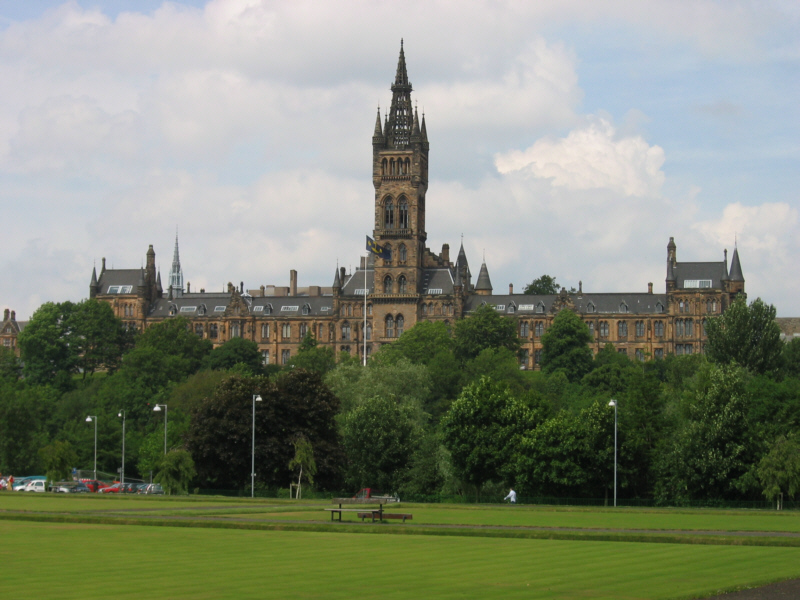
- Incumbent; John Butt since 2001
- Formation: 1928
- First holder: William Whittaker
- Website: www.gla.ac.uk/music

The Gardiner Chair of Music at the University of Glasgow was founded in 1928 and endowed by the gift of William Guthrie Gardiner and Sir Frederick Crombie Gardiner, shipowners in Glasgow. The chair was previously a joint appointment with the directorship of the Scottish National Academy of Music (now the Royal Conservatoire of Scotland), although this practice ceased on the retirement of Sir Ernest Bullock in 1952. The current professor is John Butt.

== History ==
The Chair of Music was established in 1928 with funds provided by brothers William and Sir Frederick Gardiner, Glasgow shipping merchants. The brothers endowed a number of other appointments at the university, including chairs in physiological chemistry (now biochemistry), bacteriology (now immunology) and organic chemistry (now chemistry), and the Gardiner Institute of Medicine.

William Whittaker was the first man appointed to the chair, in 1930. Whittaker had originally intended studying science but switched to music, and taught at Armstrong College of Durham University before his appointment to the chair. Whittaker expanded the teaching of music in the university such that full degrees became awardable. During this time he was also principal of the Scottish National Academy of Music. He retired in 1941 and died in 1944. His successor, Sir Ernest Bullock, was also from Durham. He was a composer of church music, and had been organist at Westminster Abbey, where he was musical director of the coronation of King George VI and Queen Elizabeth. He was appointed to the chair in 1941, and received a knighthood in 1951 in recognition of his services to music in Scotland. He resigned in 1952 to become Director of the Royal College of Music.

One Glasgow professor left to the Royal College of Music, but one was soon sent back in the form of Robin Orr, Professor of Theory and Composition at the college, appointed to the chair in 1956. He was from Brechin, Angus, although was in fact adopted and originally of Swiss nationality. He was a noted composer, writing three operas and three symphonies alongside other works. He had previously been organist of St John's College, Cambridge, and it was to Cambridge that he returned in 1964 as the Professor of Music. He was chair of Scottish Opera from 1962 to 1976 and director of Welsh National Opera from 1971 to 1983, and was awarded a CBE in 1972.

In 1966, Frederick Rimmer was appointed to the chair. Rimmer had previously lectured in music at Homerton College, Cambridge, before moving to Glasgow as Cramb Lecturer in Music in 1951. In 1954 he was appointed university organist, and in 1956 became senior lecturer in music, before his appointment to the chair in 1966. Between 1968 and 1980, Rimmer was director of Scottish Opera. He retired in 1980, at which time he received a CBE. He was succeeded the same year by Hugh Macdonald, a lecturer in music at St John's College, Oxford, and noted scholar of Hector Berlioz. He resigned in 1987 on his appointment as Avis Blewett Professor of Music at Washington University in St. Louis. In 1990, Graham Hair, Head of Composition at Sydney Conservatorium of Music, was appointed to the chair. Hair is primarily a composer for women's voices, and following his retirement in 2001 remains Emeritus Professor and Honorary Research Fellow in the Science and Music Research Group.

In 2001, John Butt, a noted Bach scholar, was appointed to the chair. Butt had previously lectured at the universities of Aberdeen, Cambridge and California, Berkeley. He has published extensively on the subject of Bach, and is also a successful conductor, his 2006 recording of Handel's Messiah with the Dunedin Consort winning the ClassicFM/Gramophone award in the Baroque Vocal Category in 2007 and the MIDEM award for Baroque Music in 2008. In March 2010, he was awarded the Royal Academy of Music/Kohn Foundation Bach Prize.

== Gardiner Professors of Music ==
- 1930–1941: William Gillies Whittaker
- 1941–1952: Sir Ernest Bullock CVO
- 1956–1964: Robert Kemsley "Robin" Orr
- 1966–1980: Frederick William Rimmer CBE
- 1980–1987: Hugh John Macdonald
- 1990–2001: Graham Barry Hair
- 2001–present: John Anthony Butt OBE FBA FRSE

== See also ==
- List of Professorships at the University of Glasgow
