= Concertgebouw =

Concertgebouw may refer to one of the following concert halls:

- Concertgebouw, Amsterdam, Netherlands
  - Royal Concertgebouw Orchestra, named after it
- Concertgebouw, Bruges, Belgium
- Concertgebouw de Vereeniging, Netherlands
