= Lev Vlassenko =

Lev Vlassenko Лев Власенко People's Artist of the USSR
- Born: Lev Nikolaevich Vlassenko; 24 December 1928; Tbilisi, Georgian Soviet Socialist Republic
- Died: 24 August 1996 (aged 67) Brisbane, Australia
- Genres: Classical music
- Occupation: Pianist
- Instrument: Piano
- Label: Melodya
- Website: classical.ru/e/VlassenkoLev/index.html

Lev Nikolaevich Vlassenko (Russian: Лев Никола́евич Вла́сенко; 24 December 1928 – 24 August 1996), was a Soviet pianist and teacher.

== Biography ==
Lev Vlassenko was born on 24 December 1928 in Tiflis, Georgian SSR, Soviet Union to Nikolai Appolonovich Vlassenko and Vera Solomonovna Benditskaya.

Vlassenko's first music teacher was his mother Vera. He entered a music school for gifted children in Tiflis in the class of Anastasia Davidovna Virsaladze, who was a pupil of the renowned Anna Yesipova. Vlassenko began to play in public at an early age. At the age of ten years, he played Beethoven's Piano Concerto No. 1 with renowned conductor Odysseas Dimitriadis. In 1948, Vlassenko entered the class of Yakov Flier at the Moscow Conservatory and completed his undergraduate and postgraduate studies.

He gained international recognition after winning the First Prize and Gold Medal at the Franz Liszt International Piano Competition in Budapest in 1956. In 1958, he and Chinese pianist Liu Shikun came second to Van Cliburn at the inaugural International Tchaikovsky Piano Competition.

Vlassenko taught at the Moscow Conservatory for 39 years. He taught several world-renowned pianists such as Mikhail Pletnev, Victor Eresko, Kalle Randalu, Mykola Suk, Lev Vinocour, Vladimir Daych, Gennady Dzubenko, Rena Shereshevskaya, Sergueï Kouznetsov, Natasha Vlassenko, Oleg Stepanov, Boris Petrov, Teofils Biķis, Karine Oganian, Jania Aubakirova, Justas Dvarionas, Alexander Strukov, Duncan Gifford and others. In the early 1990s, he was a professor in the United States, teaching at Indiana University School of Music and the New England Conservatory, Boston.

Vlassenko was a jury member in many international piano competitions, including the Paloma O'Shea Santander International Piano Competition (1984), International Tchaikovsky Piano Competition in Moscow, the Sydney International Piano Competition, the Leeds International Pianoforte Competition, the International Chopin Piano Competition in Warsaw, the Liszt Piano Competition in Budapest, and the Arthur Rubinstein Piano Competition in Tel Aviv. In 1994, Vlassenko became the President of the International Tchaikovsky Piano Competition jury. He also headed the “International Association of Tchaikovsky Competition Stars”.

In 1991, he was named a People's Artist of the USSR.

During his final years, Vlassenko resided in Australia and taught at the Queensland Conservatorium Griffith University. In 1996, he was awarded an honorary doctorate by Griffith University in recognition of his contribution to the development of the Conservatorium.

He died on 24 August 1996 in Brisbane, Australia.

== Memory ==
Vlassenko recorded 22 disks and 8 CDs.

In 1999, his daughter, Natasha Vlassenko, and son-in-law, Oleg Stepanov, founded the Lev Vlassenko Piano Competition in his memory. The competition takes place in Brisbane every two years.

One of the Moscow music schools is named after Lev Vlassenko.

Every year, the Vlassenko Piano Competition for Children takes place in Moscow.

In 2009, the book Lev Vlassenko: Articles, Reminiscences, Interviews was published in Brisbane.

At the Sydney International Piano Competition, the Lev Vlassenko Memorial Prize is awarded for the best performance of a virtuoso study.

== Words of appreciation ==
- Lev Vlassenko is a splendid musician - clever and talented. This was particularly displayed in his performance of the Liszt Sonata, which sounded wonderfully integral. One rarely has such and orchestral manner of performance combined with technical perfection. – Heinrich Neuhaus
- Lev Vlassenko is a great artist. Listeners enjoyed his excellent performance of Liszt's Sonata in B minor, a piece which is extremely complicated because of its profound ideas and virtuosity. A magnificent sense of form and style of different pieces such as the Liszt Sonata and the Shostakovich Prelude and Fugue in D minor... – Sviatoslav Richter
- ... the pianist displayed clarity, wide breath of sincerity and deep penetration into the music. – Emil Gilels
- His unpretentious temperament and natural virtuosity always serve the noble aim of revealing the inner essence of the composition. A remarkable sense of form, combined with deep sincerity is the most important feature in Lev Vlassenko's artistic image. – Yakov Flier
- ...a musician conveying deep inner thoughts and emotions that purify and enrich people's souls. – Ivan Kozlovsky
- Lev Vlassenko is an extraordinary personality with a beautiful, elevated creative nature, and a remarkable musician. He is a pianist with his own specific manner of performing – strict, but brilliant and, at the same time, deep. – Innokenty Smoktunovsky
