= Liu Shikun =

Chinese pianist and composer

Liu Shikun 刘诗昆
- Born: March 8, 1939 (age 87); Tianjin
- Origin: Beijing, Moscow
- Occupations: Pianist, composer
- Instrument: Piano
- Years active: 1944–present

Liu Shikun (simplified Chinese: 刘诗昆; traditional Chinese: 劉詩昆; pinyin: Liú Shīkūn; born March 8, 1939) is a Chinese pianist and composer.

He began his piano training at the age of three and started publicly performing by the age of five. He won third prize and the Special Prize of the Liszt International Piano Competition in Budapest in 1956 and was awarded a strand of Franz Liszt's hair. In 1958, he shared with Lev Vlassenko the second prize in the First Tchaikovsky International Piano Competition in Moscow.

Liu became one of China's top concert performers until 1966, when the Cultural Revolution and the Gang of Four attacked the country; Western music was banned and, along with thousands of other artists, Liu was arrested. He stayed in prison for eight years.

Liu studied at Beijing's Central Conservatory of Music and graduated from the Moscow Conservatory of Music.
