= Annie Fischer =

Hungarian classical pianist (1914–1995)

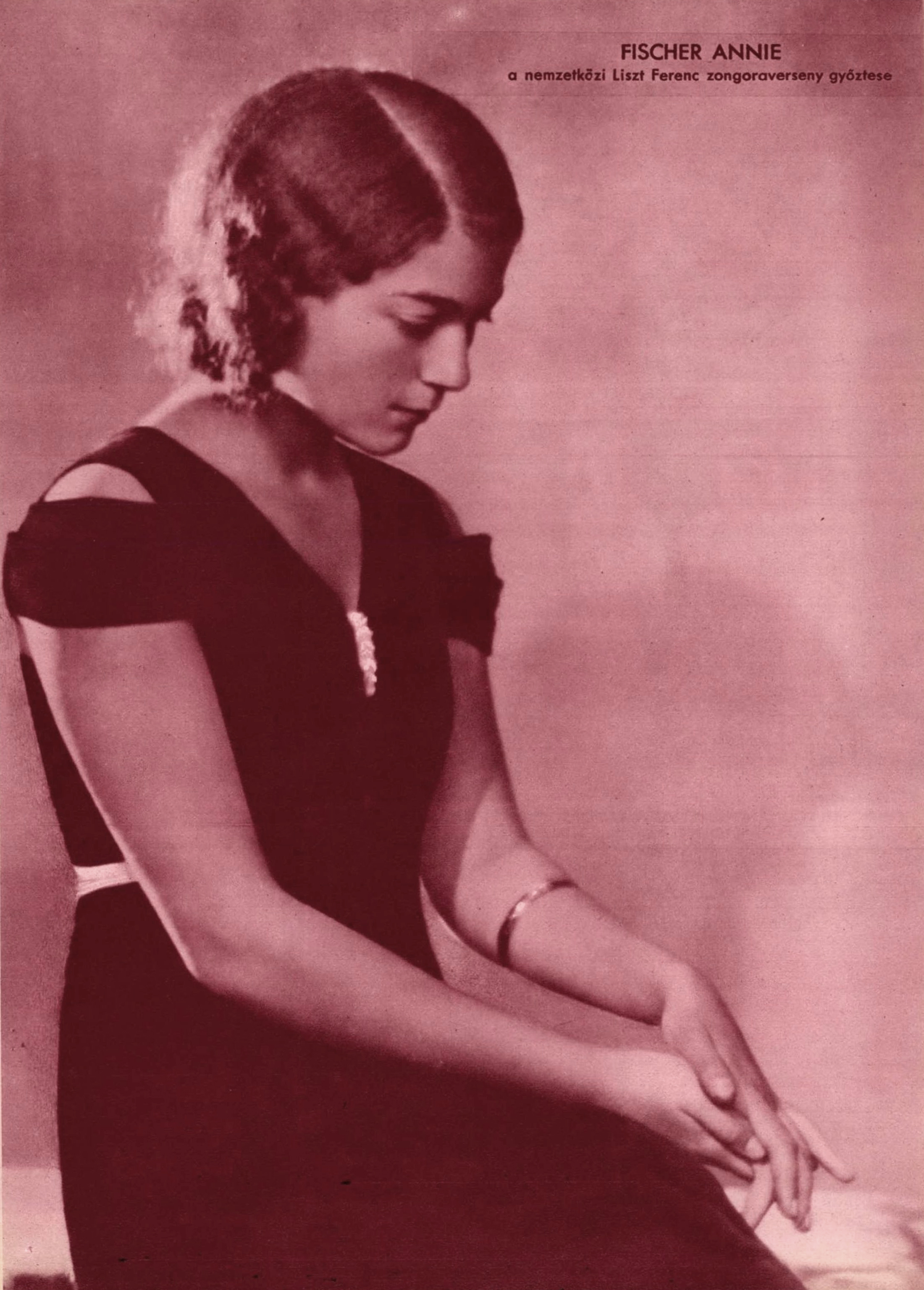
- Fischer in 1933
- Born: July 5, 1914; Budapest, Austria-Hungary
- Died: April 10, 1995 (aged 80); Budapest, Hungary
- Education: Franz Liszt Academy of Music
- Spouse: Aladár Tóth
- Awards: International Franz Liszt Piano Competition, 1933

Annie Fischer (July 5, 1914 – April 10, 1995) was a Hungarian classical pianist. She was awarded Kossuth Prize multiple times.

== Biography ==
Fischer was born into a Jewish family in Budapest and studied at the Franz Liszt Academy of Music with Ernő Dohnányi and Arnold Székely. She began her career as a concert pianist in 1924 at age ten, making her debut performance with Ludwig van Beethoven's Piano Concerto No. 1. When she was 12, she appeared with the Tonhalle-Orchester Zürich, performing Mozart's Piano Concerto No. 23 and Robert Schumann's Piano Concerto. In 1933, Fischer won the International Franz Liszt Piano Competition in her native city with a performance of Franz Liszt's Piano Sonata in B minor. Throughout her career she played mainly in Europe and Australia. She was seldom heard in the United States until late in her lifetime, giving only two concerts there by that time.

She was married to the influential critic and musicologist (and later director of the Budapest Opera) Aladár Tóth and is buried with him in Budapest.

Fischer fled with her husband to Sweden in 1940, after Hungary joined the Axis powers. After the war, in 1946, she and Tóth returned to Budapest. She died there in 1995.

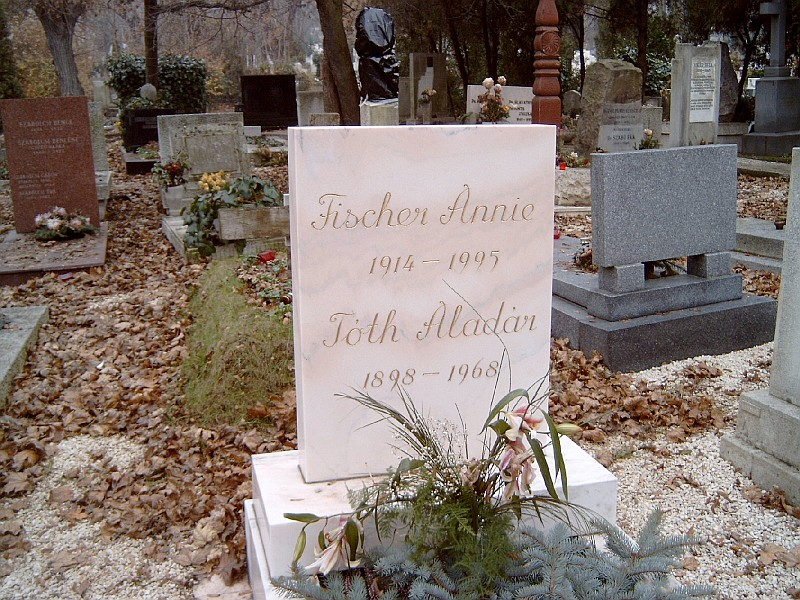
Fischer's grave in Budapest

Fischer's playing has been praised for its "characteristic intensity" and "effortless manner of phrasing" (David Hurwitz), as well as its technical power and spiritual depth. She was greatly admired by such contemporaries as Otto Klemperer and Sviatoslav Richter; Richter wrote, "Annie Fischer is a great artist imbued with a spirit of greatness and genuine profundity." The Italian pianist Maurizio Pollini praised the "childlike simplicity, immediacy and wonder" he found in her playing. Her interpretations of Mozart, Beethoven, Brahms, Schubert and Schumann, as well as Hungarian composers like Bartók have been critically acclaimed.

Fischer made studio recordings in the 1950s with Otto Klemperer and Wolfgang Sawallisch, but felt that any interpretation created in the absence of an audience would necessarily be artificially constricting, as no interpretation was ever "finished." Her legacy today thus includes many live concert recordings that have been released on CD and DVD (including a performance of Beethoven's "Emperor" concerto (available on YouTube), and Beethoven's third piano concerto with Antal Doráti conducting). Her greatest legacy, however, is a studio-made integral set of the complete Beethoven piano sonatas. She worked on this set for 15 years beginning in 1977. A self-critical perfectionist, she did not allow the set to be released in her lifetime but, since her death, it has been released on compact disc and widely praised.

== Recordings ==
Fischer's recordings have been released by several major record companies, including Angel Records, BBC Records, Doremi, EMI Classics, Hungaroton, Orfeo, Palexa, Q Disc, Urania, Melodiya, and ICA Classics.

=== Beethoven ===
- Concerto No. 1 in C major, Op. 15 (1)
- Concerto No. 3 in C minor, Op. 37 (3)
- Concerto No. 5 in E flat major, Op. 73 "Emperor" (1)
- Sonata No. 1 in F minor, Op. 2, No. 1 (2)
- Sonata No. 2 in A major, Op. 2, No. 2 (2)
- Sonata No. 3 in C major, Op. 2, No. 3 (2)
- Sonata No. 4 in E flat major, Op. 7 (2)
- Sonata No. 5 in C minor, Op. 10, No. 1 (2)
- Sonata No. 6 in F major, Op. 10, No. 2 (2)
- Sonata No. 7 in D major, Op. 10, No. 3 (3)
- Sonata No. 8 in C minor, Op. 13 "Pathétique" (3)
- Sonata No. 9 in E major, Op. 14, No. 1 (2)
- Sonata No. 10 in G major, Op. 14, No. 2 (2)
- Sonata No. 11 in B flat major, Op. 22 (2)
- Sonata No. 12 in A flat major, Op. 26 "Funeral March" (1)
- Sonata No. 13 in E flat major, Op. 27, No. 1 "Quasi una fantasia" (2)
- Sonata No. 14 in C sharp minor, Op. 27, No. 2 "Moonlight" (4)
- Sonata No. 15 in D major, Op. 28 "Pastoral" (2)
- Sonata No. 16 in G major, Op. 31, No. 1 (3)
- Sonata No. 17 in D minor, Op. 31, No. 2 "Tempest" (2)
- Sonata No. 18 in E flat major, Op. 31, No. 3 (2)
- Sonata No. 19 in G minor, Op. 49, No. 1 (2)
- Sonata No. 20 in G major, Op. 49, No. 2 (2)
- Sonata No. 21 in C major, Op. 53 "Waldstein" (2)
- Sonata No. 22 in F major, Op. 54 (2)
- Sonata No. 23 in F minor, Op. 57 "Appassionata" (2)
- Sonata No. 24 in F sharp major, Op. 78 (2)
- Sonata No. 25 in G major, Op. 79 (2)
- Sonata No. 26 in E flat major, Op. 81a "Les Adieux" (2)
- Sonata No. 27 in E minor, Op. 90 (2)
- Sonata No. 28 in A major, Op. 101 (2)
- Sonata No. 29 in B flat major, Op. 106 "Hammerklavier" (2)
- Sonata No. 30 in E major, Op. 109 (2)
- Sonata No. 31 in A flat major, Op. 110 (2)
- Sonata No. 32 in C minor, Op. 111 (3)
- Variations (32) in C minor on an Original Theme, WoO 80 (1)
- Variations and Fugue in E♭ major on an Original Theme 'Eroica', Op. 35

=== Mozart ===
- Concerto No. 20 in D minor, K 466. (1)
- Concerto No. 20 in D minor, K 466: 2nd movement, Romanze. (4)
- Concerto No. 21 in C major, K 467 (3)
- Concerto No. 21 in C major, K 467: 2nd movement, Andante (3)
- Concerto No. 22 in E flat major, K 482 (5)
- Concerto No. 22 in E flat major, K 482: 2nd movement, Andante (1)
- Concerto No. 23 in A major, K 488: 2nd movement, Adagio (1)
- Concerto No. 24 in C minor, K 491 (1)
- Concerto No. 27 in B flat major, K. 595 (1)
- Prelude and Fugue in C major, K 394 (383a) (1)
- Rondo for Piano and Orchestra in D major, K 382 (1)
- Sonata No. 10 in C major, K 330
- Sonata No. 12 in F major, K 332 (300k) (1)
- Sonata No. 14 in C minor, K 457 (1)

=== Schumann ===
- Carnaval, Op. 9 (2)
- Concerto in A minor, Op. 54 (2)
- Kinderszenen, Op. 15 (2)
- Kreisleriana, Op. 16 (2)
- Fantasia in C major, Op. 17 (1)

=== Bartók ===
- Concerto No. 3, Sz 119 (3)
- Hungarian Peasant Songs (15) for Piano, Sz 71 (1)
- Romanian Folk Dances
- Allegro Barbaro

=== Liszt ===
- Concert Etudes (3), S 144: No. 3 in D flat major, Un sospiro (1)
- Concerto No. 1 in E flat major, S 124 (2)
- Grandes Etudes (6) de Paganini, S 141: No. 6 in A minor, Quasi Presto (1)
- Sonata in B minor, S 178 (1)
- Hungarian Rhapsody No.14

=== Schubert ===
- Impromptus (4), D 935/Op. 142: No. 1 in F minor (1)
- Impromptus (4), D 935/Op. 142: No. 2 in A flat major (1)
- Impromptus (4), D 935/Op. 142: No. 3 in B flat major
- Impromptus (4), D 935/Op. 142: No. 4 in F minor (1)
- Sonata in A minor, D 845
- Sonata in A major, D 959 (1)
- Sonata in B flat major, D 960 (2)

=== Chopin ===
- Concerto No. 1 in E minor, B 53/Op. 11 (1)
- Ballade No. 1 in G minor op. 23
- Scherzo No. 3 in C sharp minor, B 125/Op. 39 (1)

=== Bach ===
- Brandenburg Concerto No. 5 in D major, BWV 1050

=== Brahms ===
- Sonata No. 3 in F minor, Op. 5

=== Dohnányi ===
- Rhapsodies (4), Op. 11: No. 2 in F sharp minor
- Rhapsodies (4), Op. 11: No. 3 in C major

=== Haydn ===
- Andante with Variations in F minor, H 17 No. 6

=== Kodály ===
- Dances of Marosszék
- Lingering Song

=== Mendelssohn ===
- Rondo capriccioso in E major, Op. 14
- Scherzo in E minor, Op. 16 No. 2
