= David Wilde =

English pianist and composer (1935–2025)

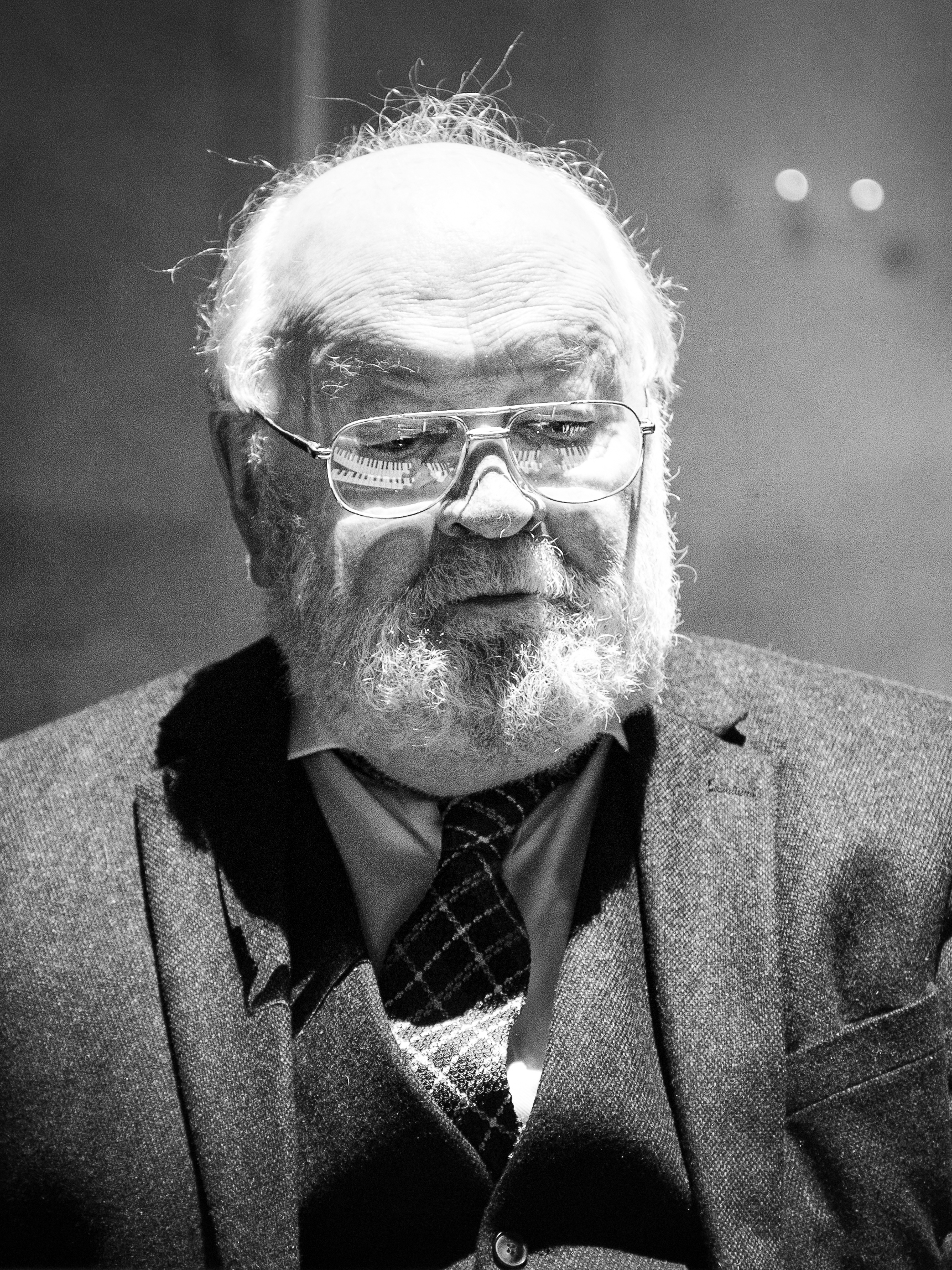
- Wilde in 2020
- Born: 25 February 1935; Stretford, Greater Manchester, England
- Died: 23 October 2025 (aged 90)
- Education: Royal Manchester College of Music
- Occupations: Classical pianist; Composer; Academic teacher
- Organizations: Musikhochschule Hannover; University of Edinburgh
- Website: david-wilde.com

David Wilde (25 February 1935 – 23 October 2025) was an English pianist, composer and academic teacher. He won the 1961 Liszt–Bartók Competition. In 1962, he won the Queen's Prize and was invited to play with the Royal Liverpool Philharmonic at the Royal Concert in the Royal Festival Hall in the presence of Queen Elizabeth II. Wilde was a professor of piano at the Musikhochschule Hannover from 1981 to 2000 and later became a visiting professor in keyboard studies at the University of Edinburgh. During the 1990s, he composed many works which protested against human rights abuses that were happening at the time and was twice honoured by the city of Sarajevo. Wilde frequently played as a soloist at the Proms.

== Life and career ==
Born in Stretford, Greater Manchester, on 25 February 1935, he studied as a boy with Solomon and his pupil Franz Reizenstein. He studied composition at the Royal Manchester College of Music with Richard Hall from 1949, elected a fellow in 1953. He won the 1961 Liszt–Bartók Competition in Budapest. Nadia Boulanger, a jury member, invited him to Paris for further study. They remained in touch for the rest of her life.

A frequent soloist at the Proms, working with such conductors as Horenstein, Boulez, and Downes, he shared with Jacqueline du Pré the honour of opening the BBC's second TV channel in the North of England with Sir John Barbirolli and the Hallé Orchestra in 1962. In the same year, Wilde won the Queen's Prize and was invited to play at the Royal Concert in the Royal Festival Hall, with the Royal Liverpool Philharmonic conducted by Sir John Pritchard, in the presence of Queen Elizabeth II, to whom he was afterwards presented by Sir Malcolm Sargent.

During the 1990s, he composed many works protesting against human rights abuses at the time and was twice honoured by the city of Sarajevo. The Cellist of Sarajevo for cello solo (1992), dedicated to Vedran Smailovic, was recorded by Yo-Yo Ma for Sony Classical, and the opera London Under Siege, after an idea by Bosnian poet Goran Simic, was produced by the State Theatre of Lower Saxony in 1998.

Wilde was professor of piano at the Musikhochschule Hannover from 1981 to 2000; his pupils include Jack Gibbons. On his return to the UK, he was appointed visiting professor in keyboard studies at the University of Edinburgh.

=== Personal life and death ===
Wilde's first marriage ended in divorce in the 1980s. He was later married to Jane Mary Wilde who was a poet, linguist, historian and musician.

Wilde died from complications of dementia on 23 October 2025, at the age of 90.

== Recordings ==
Wilde's recordings include Beethoven's Violin Sonatas with Erich Gruenberg, Reizenstein's Violin Sonata, also with Gruenberg, Thomas Wilson's Piano Concerto, especially composed for him, and works by Schumann, Liszt, and Chopin. He recorded for His Master's Voice, Decca Oiseau Lyre, Lyrita Saga and CRD, and latterly exclusively for Delphian Records of Edinburgh, who issued a recordings of music by Dallapiccola, Busoni, and Liszt, Schumann and Brahms. A Brahms recital was issued in 2010.

He recorded Bartok's Piano Concerto No. 2 with the BBC Scottish Symphony Orchestra, released in 1977, Stravinsky's Concerto for Piano and Wind instruments with the same orchestra, and Stockhausen's Gruppen, in which he played first celesta for the UK premiere in Glasgow conducted by Gibson, and first piano when Boulez conducted it in London. The Cellist of Sarajevo and chamber music was recorded in 2017.
