= Aladár Tóth =

Hungarian music manager (1932–2023)

- Born: 4 February 1898; Székesfehérvár, Hungary
- Died: 18 October 1968 (aged 70); Budapest, Hungary
- Occupations: Musicologist; Music critic; Opera manager
- Organizations: Nyugat; Hungarian State Opera
- Spouse: Annie Fischer
- Awards: Kossuth Prize

Aladár Tóth (4 February 1898 – 28 October 1968) was a Hungarian musicologist and opera manager, regarded as a leading music critic in Hungary between the world wars, writing for Nyugat, among others. He was instrumental in the recognition of composers such as Zoltán Kodály and Béla Bartók. He was general manager of the Hungarian State Opera from 1946 to 1956.

== Life and career ==
Tóth was born in Székesfehérvár on 4 February 1898. He received instruction in piano and composition in his hometown. He then studied at the University of Budapest, earning a Ph.D. in 1925 with a dissertation about the aesthetics of Mozart's dramatic music. Tóth worked as a music critic for the journal Új nemzedék from 1920 to 1923 and Pesti Napló until 1939. He wrote for Nyugat (West), a progressive journal, from 1923 to 1940. He played a role in the reception of Béla Bartók's music; in a yearly commentary in Nyugat about the concert season, he regularly emphasized Bartók's importance for Hungarian culture and criticized the lack of performances by major music institutions.

During World War II, Tóth's family went to exile in Sweden and then lived in Switzerland. They returned to Budapest after the war, and Tóth served as director of the Hungarian State Opera from 1946 to 1956. He received the Kossuth Prize in 1952.

=== Personal life ===
In 1937 Tóth married the pianist Annie Fischer. He died in Budapest on 28 October 1968.
