= Ethella Chupryk =

Ukrainian pianist (1964–2019)

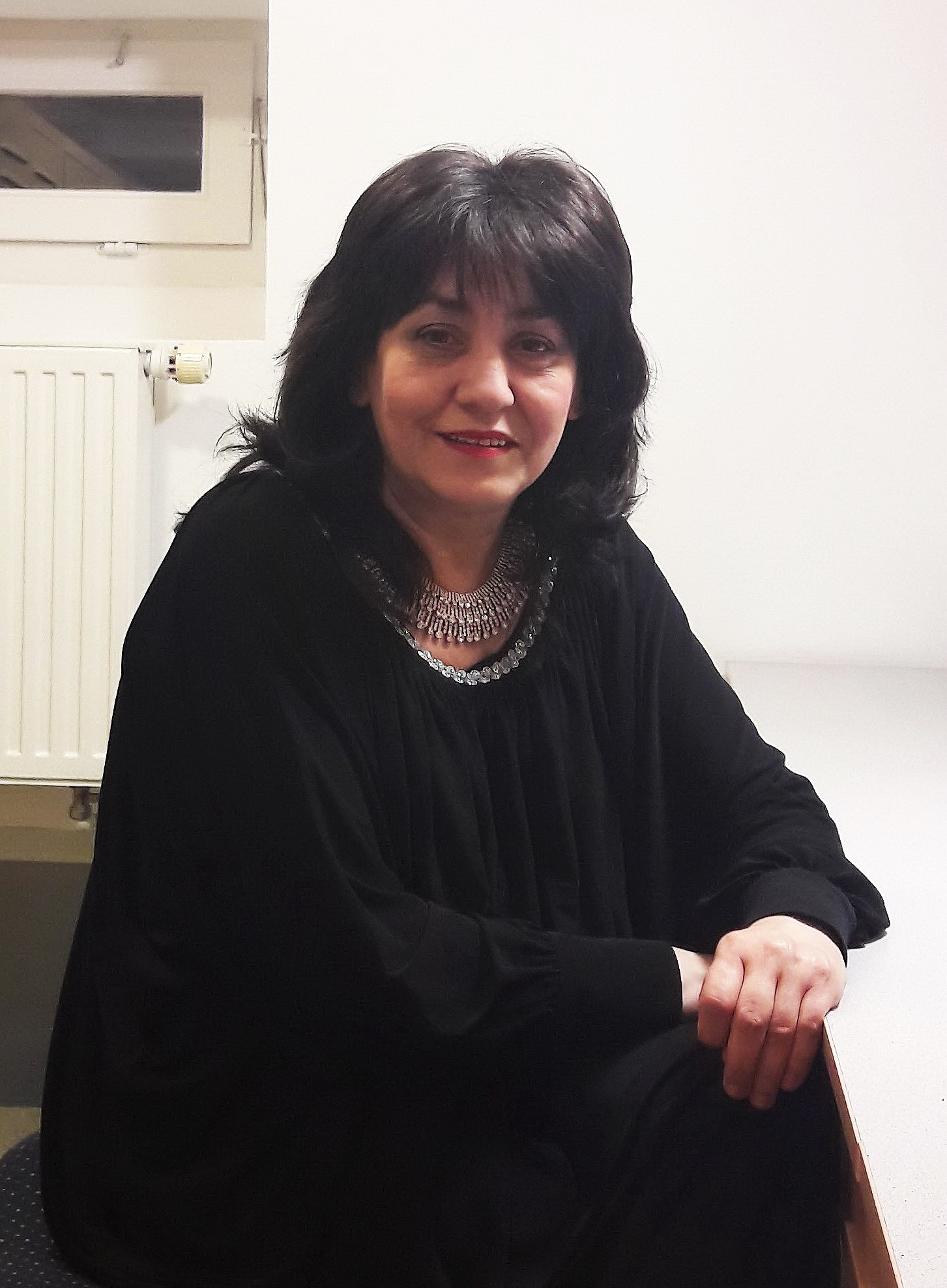
- Born: Csuprik Etelka; 20 June 1964; Vynohradiv, Ukrainian SSR, Soviet Union
- Died: 25 December 2019 (aged 55); Lviv, Ukraine
- Other name: Ukrainian [Етелла Чуприк] Hungarian [Csuprik Etelka]
- Citizenship: Ukraine
- Education: Mikola Lisenko Conservatory
- Occupations: Classical Pianist, Professor
- Known for: Interpretations of Bach, Mozart, Rachmaninoff, Liszt, Schubert, Chopin
- Awards: 1988. first place at the Mykola Lysenko International Music Competition.; 1990. third place Sergey Rachmaninov International Piano Competition.; 1991. third place at the Franz Liszt International Piano Competition in Budapest.; 1994. Gold medal and prize at the International Competition for Pianists in Memory of Vladimir Horowitz.; 1998. Wagner association exhibitioner (Bayreuth, Germany).

Ethella Chupryk (Ukrainian: Етелла Чуприк; 20 June 1964 – 25 December 2019) was a Ukrainian pianist and Professor of piano at the Mykola Lysenko National Music Academy in Lviv, Ukraine.

== Childhood ==
Ethella Chupryk was born in Vynohradiv, Zakarpattia Oblast, in a musical family. At the age of three, Etelka made a lifelong friendship with the piano. By the age of five she performed her first public concert performing Chopin's Waltz No. 7 in C sharp minor and Schubert's "Serenade".

After finishing musical school (at Judith Gergely's class) and musical college (at Mary Valkovsky's class), in 1986 she entered the Mykola Lysenko Conservatory in Lviv; she became an internationally renowned pianist under the supervision of Maryna Kryh., piano professor of the Conservatory. Then she took master classes at the Moscow Conservatory with pianist teachers such as Yevgeny Malinyin, Vera Gornostayeva, Vladimir Viardo and Vladimir Krajnyev.

Etelka became laureate at several international competitions: 1988 - Lysenko Competition in Kyiv (First Prize) 1990 - Rakhmaninov Competition in Moscow (Third Prize) 1991 - Liszt Competition in Budapest (Third Prize).

== Achievements ==
Shortly after starting her studies in Lviv, Chupryk began to compete in a number of international piano competitions. In 1988 she took first place at the Mykola Lysenko International Music Competition. In 1990, she traveled to Moscow to compete in what was then known as the All-Union Rachmaninov Competition and the precursor to the Sergey Rachmaninov International Piano Competition. Here she took third place. In September 1991 she was awarded third place at the Franz Liszt International Piano Competition in Budapest.

In 1994 she was awarded a gold medal and prize at the International Competition for Pianists in Memory of Vladimir Horowitz in Kyiv. Then she received an honorary bursary from the Richard Wagner association exhibitioner (Bayreuth, Germany, 1998).

At that time, she gave concerts in several European countries. She worked with renowned conductors including András Ligeti, Jerzy Salvarovsky, Robert de Koning, Karol Stryja and Jansug Kakhidze. In her repertoire, you can always find compositions by Bach, Mozart, Beethoven, Liszt, Bartók, Kodály and Chopin.

She published more than 30 CDs consisting of outstanding works of music literature at record labels Naxos, Philips, Amadis and IJMPS.

She was a professor at the Mykola Lysenko National Conservatory in Lviv and pianist in the Philharmonic Orchestra of Lviv County and Subcarpathian County.

In 1994, in recognition of this artistic work, she was named "Honoured Artist of Ukraine", in 2016 – "Folk Artist of Ukraine".

From 2018–2019 she gave concerts in Madrid, Barcelona, Brussels, Kyiv and Kharkiv, hosted by the Hungarian Embassy and Consulate General.

== Repertoire ==
Concerts for piano and orchestra:

J. S. Bach

- Concerto No. 1 in D minor, BWV 1052

W. A. Mozart:

- Piano Concerto No. 20 in D minor, K. 466 (10 February 1785)
- Piano Concerto No. 21 in C major, K. 467 (9 March 1785)
- Piano Concerto No. 23 in A major, K. 488 (2 March 1786)
- Piano Concerto No. 24 in C minor, K. 491 (24 March 1786)

L. van Beethoven:

- Piano Concerto No. 5 in E♭ major, Op. 73

S. Rachmaninoff:

- Piano Concerto No. 3 in D minor, Op. 30
- Piano Concerto No. 4 in G minor, Op. 40
- Symphony No. 2 in E minor, Op. 27. Arranged as Piano Concerto No. 5 by Alexander Warenberg

J. Brahms:

- Piano Concerto No. 2 in B♭ major, Op. 83

F. Liszt:

- Piano Concerto No. 1 in E♭ major, S. 124
- Piano Concerto No. 2 in A major, S. 125

F. Chopin

- Piano Concerto No. 1 in E minor, Op. 11
- Andante spianato et grande polonaise brillante in E♭ major, Op. 22

P. I. Tchaikovsky

- Piano Concerto No. 1 in B♭ minor, Op. 23

E. Grieg

- Piano Concerto in A minor, Op. 16

G. Gershwin

- Rhapsody in Blue for solo piano and jazz band

S. Prokofiev

- Piano Concerto No. 2 in G minor, Op. 16

== Discography ==
Year	Released by	Repertoire
1992	Amadis Lydian Donau	F. Liszt: Sonata in B Minor; Rhapsodie Espagnole; Nuages gris; Mazeppa; Mephisto Waltz No. 1.
1993	Lydian	L. van Beethoven Piano Concerto No. 5. "Emperor" P. I. Tchaikovsky: Piano Concerto No. 1.
1995	Amadis Smooth Classical	L. van Beethoven: Piano sonata No. 17 "Tempest"; Piano sonata No. 26 "Les Adieux"; Piano sonata No. 31
1995	Amadis Smooth Classical	L. van Beethoven: Piano sonata No. 15 "Pastoral"; Piano sonata No. 21 "Waldstein"
1995	Amadis Smooth Classical	S. Rachmaninov: Variations on a Theme Chopin; Etude Tableau; Prelude; Liebesleid - Elégie; Piano works
1996	Amadis	F. Schubert: Impromptus Op. 90; Impromptus Op. 112; Moments Musiciaux Op. 91
2000	Amadis	S. Rachmaninov: Variations on a Theme Chopin; Etude Tableau in C minor; 13 Preludes in B minor; Liebesleid (Kreisler); Elégie No. 1; Mélodie No. 3
2008	Rostyslav Shtyn	The Vancouver collection Undiscovered geniuses of piano music
2009	Smooth Classical Lydian Naxos	R. Shumann: Carnaval; Kindersczenen; Papillons
2016	Amadis Smooth Classical	F. Liszt: Sonata in B Minor; Rhapsodie Espagnole; Mephisto Waltz No. 1
2018	IJMPS	GOLD SELECTION of Classical Piano Music Volume 1.: J. S. Bach Chorale Prelude "Ich ruf zu dir, Herr" BWV 639; J. S. Bach Prelude and Fugue in D major BWV 850; J. S. Bach Prelude and Fugue in D minor BWV 875; W. A. Mozart Requiem - Lacrimosa, Domine Jesu K. 626; W. A. Mozart Fantasia in C minor K. 475; L. van Beethoven Piano Sonata No. 14 in C sharp minor (Moonlight) Op. 27, No. 2. - 1. mov. - Adagio sostenuto.; F. Chopin Nocturne B flat minor Op. 9 No. 1; F. Chopin Nocturne F major Op. 15 No. 1; F. Chopin Waltz C sharp minor Op. 64. No. 2
2018	IJMPS	Edvard Grieg - Piano Concerto in A minor, Op. 16.
2019	IJMPS	J. S. Bach: Das Wohltemperierte Klavier I. - II. BWV 846 - 893 (4 CDs)
2019	IJMPS	GOLD SELECTION of Classical Piano Music Volume 2.: J. S. Bach Prelude and Fugue in C minor WTC I. BWV 847; J. S. Bach Prelude and Fugue in G minor WTC II. BWV 885; J. S. Bach Prelude and Fugue in B minor WTC II. BWV 893; W. A. Mozart Rondo D major K. 485; F. Chopin Ballade in G minor Op. 23. No. 1.; F. Liszt Spanish Rhapsody S. 254; S. Rachmaninoff Elégie Op. 3 No. 1.; P. I. Tchaikovsky The Nutcracker Op. 71. Dance of the Sugar-Plum Fairy, Sugar Plum and Cavalier: Adagio - transcribed by Ethella Chupryk
2019	IJMPS	GOLD SELECTION of Classical Piano Music Volume 3. (NEW) F. Chopin: Polonaise-Fantaisie op. 61 in A flat Major; Sonata Op. 58 No. 3 in B Minor; Nocturne Op. 9, No. 3 in B major
