= Fred Rimmer =

British musician

Frederick William Rimmer CBE FRSE FRCO FRSAMD (21 February 1914 – 3 July 1998) was a 20th-century British musician who served as the Gardiner Professor of Music at Glasgow University from 1966 to 1980 and for the same time period was Director of Scottish Opera. He also founded the Scottish Music Archive. Friends and colleagues generally knew him as Fred Rimmer.

== Life ==
Rimmer was born in Liverpool on 21 February 1914, the son of William Rimmer and his wife, Amy Graham McMillan. He was educated at Quarry Bank High School in Liverpool.

He studied music at Durham University graduating BMus in 1939. In the Second World War he served in the 11th battalion Lancashire Fusiliers in the Middle East, and rising to the rank of major. After the war he did further postgraduate study at Selwyn College, Cambridge gaining a further BA in 1948 and MA in 1954. Whilst studying he was also senior lecturer in music at Homerton College, Cambridge.

In 1951 he went to Glasgow University as Cramb Lecturer in Music. He became official organist to the university in 1954 and was promoted to senior lecturer in 1956. In 1966 he succeeded Prof Robin Orr as Gardiner Professor of Music at Glasgow and held this position until retiral in 1980.

In the 1980 Birthday Honours Queen Elizabeth II appointed him a Commander of the Order of the British Empire (CBE).

In 1996 (aged 82, and one of the oldest admissions) he was elected a Fellow of the Royal Society of Edinburgh. His proposers were Robert Alex Rankin, Walter Douglas Munn, Ian Naismith Sneddon, Philip Ledger and Sir Alexander Gibson.

He died on 3 July 1998.

== Family ==
In 1941 he married Joan Doreen Graham.

== Publications ==
- Pastorale and Toccata for Organ (1968)
