= Veronica Gibson =

Scottish arts patron (1937–2022)

Lady Veronica Gibson (née Waggett, 21 January 1937 – 27 January 2022) was a Scottish arts patron who was the President of Scottish Opera. She has been described as "one of the best-connected women in Scotland" and “a beloved fixture of Scotland’s cultural landscape for six decades". She trained as a dancer and met her husband at Sadlers Wells. They married in 1958. Lady Gibson played a key role in Scottish behind the scenes development of Scottish Opera when her husband founded it in 1962. She became President of Scottish Opera in 2013 and remained so until her death.

Gibson was married to Alexander Gibson and founded the Alexander Gibson Opera School at the Royal Conservatoire of Scotland after his death. She died on 27 January 2022, at the age of 85.
