= Musica Nova Festival, Glasgow =

Scottish music festival

Musica Nova is a triennial festival of contemporary music presented jointly by Glasgow University and the Scottish National Orchestra. The new music festival in Glasgow was founded in 1961 as Musica Viva by Alexander Gibson with help from Scottish composer and Professor of Music at Glasgow Robin Orr. It was later transformed into the triennial festival of modern music Musica Nova, with Gibson working this time with Orr's successor, Professor Frederick Rimmer.
