= Ernest Bullock =

English organist, composer, teacher (1890–1979)

Sir Ernest Bullock CVO
- Bullock in 1960

Background information
- Born: 15 September 1890; Wigan, England
- Died: 24 May 1979 (aged 88)
- Occupations: Organist; composer; teacher

Sir Ernest Bullock CVO (15 September 1890 – 24 May 1979) was an English organist, composer, and teacher. He was organist of Exeter Cathedral from 1917 to 1928 and of Westminster Abbey from 1928 to 1941. In the latter post he was jointly responsible for the music at the coronation of George VI in 1937.

When the Abbey's choir was dispersed during World War II, Bullock took up an academic career, first in the dual post of professor of music at the University of Glasgow and principal of the Royal Scottish Academy of Music and Drama, and then, from 1953 to 1960, as director of the Royal College of Music in London.

As a composer, Bullock wrote mostly church music, including twenty anthems and motets, two settings of the Te Deum and two of the Magnificat and organ pieces. He also published a few part songs and other secular vocal works.

== Life and career ==
=== Early years ===
Bullock was born on 15 September 1890 in Wigan, Lancashire, the youngest of six children of Thomas Bullock and his wife Eliza, née Stout. As a small boy he joined the choir at Wigan parish church, where Edward Bairstow was then organist. Thomas and Eliza Bullock died when Ernest was still a boy, and Bairstow took charge of his musical and general education, taking him as an articled pupil and sending him to Wigan Grammar School.

In 1906, Bairstow moved to a more prominent post, organist of Leeds parish church; he took his pupil with him into his home, along with his own three children. At Leeds, Bullock was appointed assistant organist to Bairstow at the parish church, (Note: The date of his first appointment to this post is variously given as 1906 in Bullock's Who's Who entry, 1907 in Grove's Dictionary of Music and Musicians and the obituary notice in The Times, and 1908 in Dictionary of Composers for the Church in Great Britain and Ireland.) and organist of St Mary, Micklefield (from 1908), and St John the Baptist Church, Adel (1910–12).

At that time non-residential students were able to qualify for music degrees from Durham University; Bullock graduated Bachelor of Music in 1908 and became a Doctor of Music in 1914. In 1909 he passed the examination to become a fellow of the Royal College of Organists.

=== Career as organist ===
After serving as sub-organist to Sydney Nicholson at Manchester Cathedral from 1912 to 1915, Bullock joined the army during World War I, serving as captain and adjutant until 1919. On his return to civilian life, he was briefly organist of St Michael's College, Tenbury, and then organist and choirmaster at Exeter Cathedral from 1919 to 1927. In the Oxford Dictionary of National Biography, Sir Thomas Armstrong writes of Bullock's time at Exeter: "with determination that was considered at times ruthless, he put new life into the music of the cathedral, the diocese, and the region"

In 1919, Bullock married Margery Newborn, daughter of a Lincolnshire solicitor. They had two sons and a daughter.

In 1928, Nicholson, who had moved from Manchester to be organist and master of the choristers at Westminster Abbey, retired. The post was offered to Bairstow, who was by then master of the music at York Minster; he preferred to stay in Yorkshire, his native county, and, probably on his recommendation, Bullock was appointed to the Abbey.

Armstrong writes that at the abbey, Bullock showed the same reforming energy as he had at Exeter. He reorganised the daily choral offices and led the musical side of many state occasions. Among the latter was the coronation of George VI on 12 May 1937, for which Bullock composed fanfares and acted as joint musical director, together with Sir Adrian Boult. The music-making on that occasion was described in the Dictionary of Composers for the Church in Great Britain and Ireland as the finest music ever heard in the abbey.

In May 1940, enemy bombing during World War II destroyed much of the Little Cloister of the abbey, where senior officials of the abbey had their houses. Bullock's was among them; all his property and papers were destroyed along with the building. The abbey itself was hit, though less seriously, and it was decided that its musical establishment had to be dispersed.

=== Academic and principal ===
The music at the abbey being much scaled down, Bullock resigned in 1941 and took up the dual post of Gardiner Professor of Music at the University of Glasgow and principal of the Scottish National Academy of Music, which became the Royal Scottish Academy of Music during his time in charge. The Times later commented that Bullock's immediate predecessor in the dual role, W. G. Whittaker, had "for various personal reasons ... found some difficulty in making Glasgow academic music run smoothly." Bullock reorganised and co-ordinated the two posts, leading to the post-war expansion of the institutions. After he left, the dual role was divided between two holders. Armstrong comments that in Bullock's eleven years in Glasgow he made a significant contribution to Scottish music; he chaired the music committee of the Scottish Arts Council from 1943 to 1950.

On the retirement of Sir George Dyson as director of the Royal College of Music, London in 1952, Bullock was appointed to succeed him. Drawing on his experience in Glasgow, he redesigned the training of music teachers, and, in Armstrong's phrase, was admired for "his skill in dealing with temperamental students and even more temperamental professors". In addition to running the college he gave classes in improvisation that were regarded as "among the finest experiences that the curriculum offered".

Bullock was appointed CVO in the 1937 Coronation Honours and was knighted in the 1951 King's Birthday Honours List. In 1955 he was awarded an honorary Doctor of Law at Glasgow University. He was an honorary member of the Royal Academy of Music and president of the Incorporated Society of Musicians (1947) and of the Royal College of Organists (1951–52), and was joint chairman of the Associated Board of the Royal Schools of Music (1952–60).

Bullock retired from the RCM in 1960, and settled in Long Crendon, near Aylesbury, where he died aged 88 on 24 May 1979.

== Music ==
Bullock is known for his church music, including the anthems "Give us the wings of faith", and "O most merciful". His output includes three evening services, two Te Deums, two Magnificats, a Jubilate, twenty anthems and motets, organ music and a small number of part-songs and other secular vocal pieces. Armstrong describes his style, as derived from Parry and Stanford, "highly conservative but effective in the liturgical context for which much of it was intended."

== Notes and references ==
=== Sources ===
- Anon. (13 May 1937). "Music in the Abbey". The Times. p. 28.
- Anon. (16 November 1979). "Sir Ernest Bullock". The Times. Obituaries supplement. p. V.
- Anon. (1 December 2007). "Bullock, Sir Ernest". Who's Who & Who Was Who (online ed.). Oxford University Press.
- Armstrong, Thomas (2020). "Bullock, Sir Ernest (1890–1979)". Oxford Dictionary of National Biography (online ed.). Oxford University Press. doi:10.1093/ref:odnb/30873.
- Bullock, Ernest (2004). "Bairstow, Sir Edward Cuthbert (1874–1946)". Oxford Dictionary of National Biography. Oxford: Oxford University Press. doi:10.1093/ref:odnb/30542.(subscription required)
- Golding, Rosemary (2013). Music and Academia in Victorian Britain. Farnham, England: Ashgate. ISBN 978-1-4094-5751-0.
- Humphreys, Maggie; Evans, Robert (1997). Dictionary of Composers for the Church in Great Britain and Ireland. London: Mansell. ISBN 978-0-7201-2330-2.
- Jackson, Francis (5 July 1986). "Sir Edward Bairstow". Church Music Society.
- Turner, Malcolm (2001). "Bullock, Sir Ernest". Grove Music Online (8th ed.). Oxford University Press. doi:10.1093/gmo/9781561592630.article.04304. ISBN 978-1-56159-263-0. (subscription, Wikilibrary access, or UK public library membership required)

Church of England titles
Preceded by Daniel Joseph Wood	Organist and Master of the Choristers of Exeter Cathedral; 1919–1927	Succeeded by Thomas Armstrong
Preceded by Sydney Nicholson	Organist and Master of the Choristers of Westminster Abbey; 1927–1941	Succeeded by William McKie
Academic offices
Preceded by William G. Whittaker	Gardiner Professor of Music; 1941–1952	Succeeded by Robin Orr
Preceded by William G. Whittaker	Director of the Royal Scottish Academy of Music; 1941–1952	Succeeded by Henry Havergal
Preceded by Sir George Dyson	Director of the Royal College of Music; 1953–1960	Succeeded by Keith Falkner
Non-profit organization positions
Preceded by Thomas Armstrong	President of the Incorporated Society of Musicians; 1946–1947	Succeeded by Harold Craxton
