= Richard Hall (composer) =

English musician and composer

- Born: September 16, 1903
- Died: May 24, 1982 (aged 78)
- Occupations: Musician; Composer; Academic teacher

Richard Hall (16 September 1903 – 24 May 1982) was an English musician and composer who became professor of composition at the Royal Manchester College of Music, a position he held from 1938 until 1956, when he became director of music at Dartington College of Arts. Hall became an ordained Anglican minister in 1926, and in 1967 he left Dartington to become a Unitarian minister.

Hall's pupils at the Royal Manchester College of Music included Ronald Stevenson, Arthur Butterworth, Peter Maxwell Davies, Harrison Birtwistle, Alexander Goehr, David Wilde and John Ogdon.

His orchestral compositions include a Piano Concerto (1931), Violin Concerto (1939), Cello Concerto (1944) and four numbered Symphonies. He also wrote much chamber music (including many string quartets and sonatas) and solo piano music (including 19 numbered sonatas).
