= Kalle Randalu =

Estonian pianist

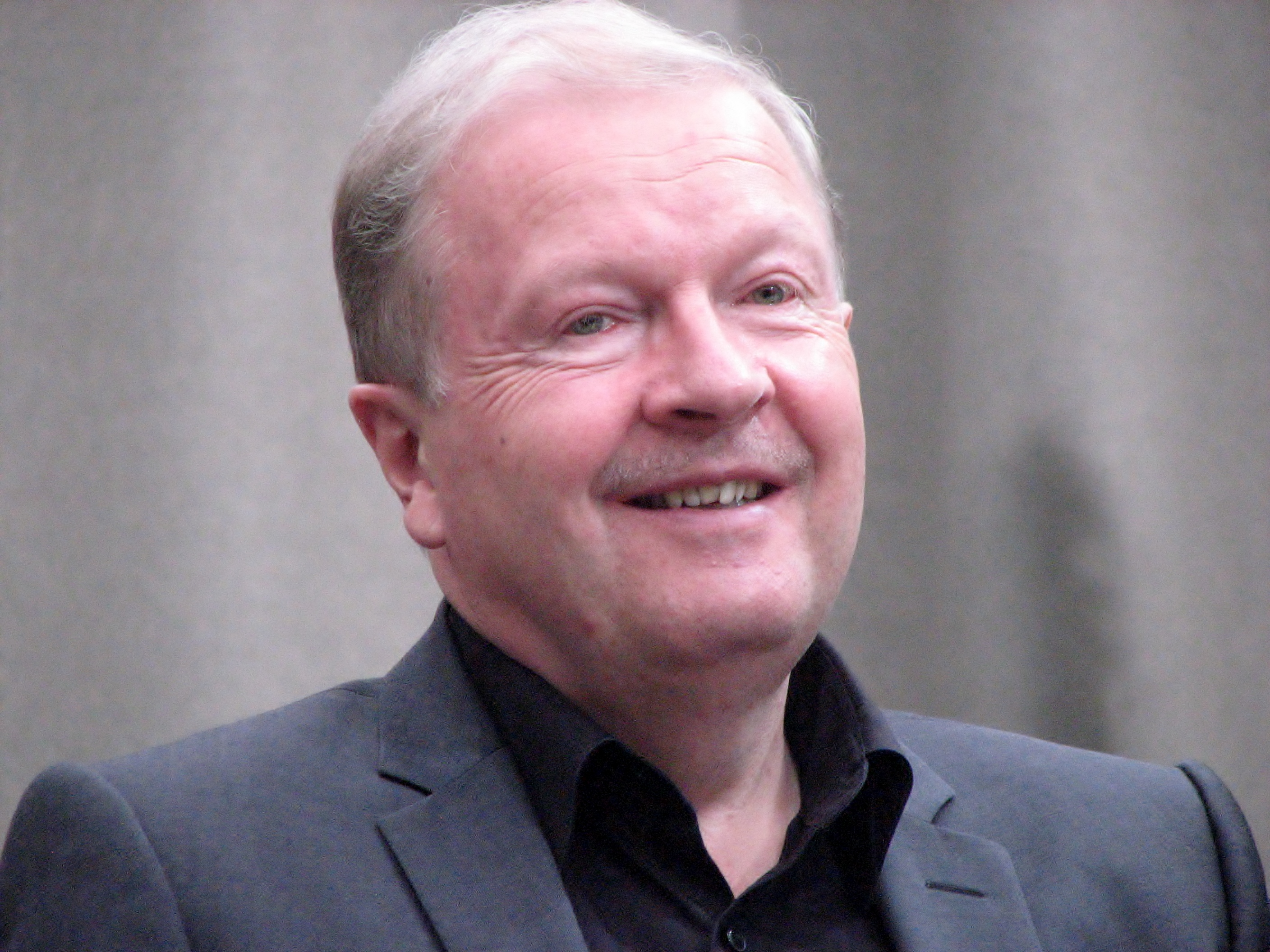
Kalle Randalu in 2013

Kalle Randalu (born 25 November 1956) is an Estonian pianist.

Randalu was born in Tallinn, and trained at the Moscow Conservatory under Lev Vlassenko. In 1981-82 Randalu was awarded two competition prizes: he shared the VII Tchaikovsky Competition's 4th prize with Dmitri Gaiduk; and shared the VIII Schumann Competition's 3rd prize with Balázs Szokolay. He subsequently won the 1985 ARD Competition in Munich, and settled in Germany in 1988. He is a professor at the Musikhochschule Karlsruhe and an honorary doctor of the Estonian Academy of Music and Theatre.

Randalu has performed internationally. He has made recordings of chamber music by Carl Reinecke, Zdeněk Fibich, Gabriel Fauré, Charles Koechlin, André Caplet, Béla Bartók, Erwin Schulhoff, Gideon Klein, Paul Hindemith and Pēteris Vasks. In addition, he has recorded Raimo Kangro's 2nd piano concerto and Lepo Sumera's Piano Concerto.

== Discography ==
- Jaan Rääts. Marginalia. 2014 Estonian Record Productions, ERP 5814
- Great Maestros I (with Estonian National Symphony Orchestra and Neeme Järvi). 2016 Estonian Record Productions, ERP 8916
- Great Maestros II (with Estonian National Symphony Orchestra and Neeme Järvi). 2016 Estonian Record Productions, ERP 9016
