= Robin Orr =

Scottish composer (1909–2006)

Robin Orr CBE
- Portrait by Jane Brown, 1990s
- Born: 2 June 1909; Brechin, Forfarshire, Scotland
- Died: 9 April 2006 (aged 96)
- Education: Loretto School; Royal College of Music
- Alma mater: Pembroke College, Cambridge
- Occupations: Organist; composer
- Spouse(s): Margaret Mace (m. 1937; div. 1979) Doris Winny-Meyer (m. 1979)
- Children: 3

Robert Kemsley (Robin) Orr CBE (2 June 1909 – 9 April 2006) was a Scottish organist and composer.

== Life ==
Born in Brechin, and educated at Loretto School, he studied the organ at the Royal College of Music in London under Walter Galpin Alcock, and piano with Arthur Benjamin. He then continued at Pembroke College, Cambridge under Cyril Rootham. Following further studies with Alfredo Casella and Nadia Boulanger in Paris he returned to Cambridge in 1938 as organist of St John's College, succeeding Rootham. During his war service in the Royal Air Force Herbert Howells deputised for him.

After World War II he became a lecturer at Cambridge and a professor at the Royal College of Music, then Gardiner Professor of Music at Glasgow University from 1956 to 1965. While in Glasgow he worked with Alexander Gibson to set up the Musica Viva contemporary music festival, promoting the work of (among others) Stockhausen, Schoenberg, Stravinsky, Iain Hamilton, Thea Musgrave, and Orr himself. Gibson also asked Orr to help him form Scottish Opera in 1960, and Orr served as the founding chairman between 1962 and 1976.

He returned to Cambridge in 1965 as Professor of Music, a post he held until his retirement in 1976 (later Emeritus). He was made a CBE in 1972. Robin Orr married Margaret Mace, the daughter of Egyptologist Arthur Cruttenden Mace, in December 1937. They had three children. In 1979 they divorced and Orr married again, to Doris Winny-Meyer. An "entertaining if somewhat personally reticent" autobiography, Musical Chairs, was published in 1999.

He was not related to Buxton Orr (1924-1997) – also a Scottish composer.

== Music ==
The overture The Prospect of Whitby (after the London pub) attracted some attention in 1948. But it was the Symphony in One Movement (1960–63), first championed by Norman Del Mar and the BBC Scottish Orchestra, but soon taken up and recorded by the Royal Scottish National Orchestra under Alexander Gibson, that put Orr on the map as a composer. Gibson subsequently conducted the work at the BBC Proms in 1966. There were two further symphonies (1970 and 1978), both also one movement works. He wrote three operas: the "pithy, socially perceptive" Full Circle (commissioned by Scottish Television for Scottish Opera in 1968), the "tense and powerful" Hermiston (Edinburgh Festival 1975) and the "witty, artful comic opera" On the Razzle (1988), based on Tom Stoppard's play. And Orr also made a substantial contribution to Anglican church music, much of it written for St John's College. Notable is the anthem Come and let yourselves be built (1961).

A CD of his orchestral music, including the Italian Overture (1952), From the Book of Philip Sparrow for soprano and strings setting John Skelton (1969), Rhapsody for string orchestra (1958) and Journeys and Places for soprano and orchestra setting Edwin Muir (1971) was issued in 2000 to mark the composer's 90th birthday. A further CD of his chamber music, including Max Rostal's historic 1948 recording of the Sonatina for violin and piano (1941), as well as other archive recordings of the Violin Sonata (1947), Serenade for string trio (1948, rev. 1989) and Duo for violin and cello in one movement (1953, rev. 1965), was issued for the centenary in 2009. The chamber music shows a growing maturity of compositional technique and intensity of feeling, especially after the war (for instance in the slow dolente movement of the 1947 Violin Sonata). The Serenade shows the growing influence on Central European expressionism on his music. The Duo for violin and cello is so dense it sometimes sounds almost like a string quartet.

The Sinfonietta Helvetica (1990) was his final orchestral work. It written in Switzerland, where he had a second home near Klosters, to mark the 700th anniversary of the Swiss confederation. It was first performed at the Glasgow Royal Concert Hall on 6 December 1991 by the BBC Scottish Symphony Orchestra, conducted by Feodor Glushchenko.

== Selected works ==
- Sonatina for violin and piano (1941)
- Violin Sonata (1947)
- Serenade for string trio (1948, rev. 1989)
- The Prospect of Whitby, orchestral overture (1948)
- Italian Overture, in orchestral and chamber versions (1952/1960)
- Duo for violin and cello (1953, rev. 1965)
- Spring Cantata for soloist, chorus, percussion and strings (1955)
- Rhapsody for string orchestra (1956)
- Come and let yourselves be built, choral anthem (1961)
- Symphony (No. 1) in one movement (1963)
- Full Circle, television opera (1968)
- From the Book of Philip Sparrow for mezzo-soprano and strings (1969)
- Symphony No. 2 (1970)
- Journeys and Place for mezzo-soprano and strings (1971)
- Hermiston, opera (1975)
- Symphony No. 3 (1978)
- Verses from Ogden Nash for voice and strings (1978)
- On the Razzle, opera (1988)
- Sinfonietta Helvetica (1990)

Preceded by Cyril Rootham	Director of Music, St John's College, Cambridge; 1938–1951	Succeeded by George Guest
