= Mykola Suk =

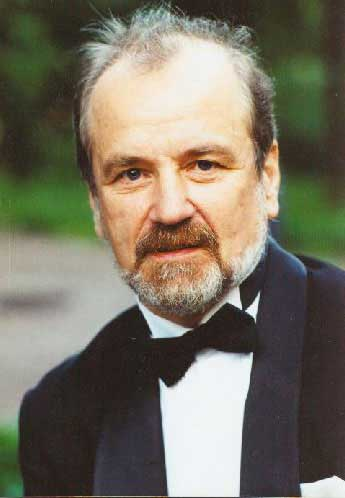

Background information
- Born: December 21, 1945 (age 80); Kiev, Ukrainian SSR, Soviet Union
- Genres: Classical
- Occupations: Pianist, pedagogue
- Instrument: Piano
- Website: Shupp Artists Management

Mykola Petrovich Suk (Ukrainian: Микола Петрович Сук; born December 21, 1945) is a Ukrainian American pianist and Merited Artist of Ukraine.

== Biography ==
Born in Kiev, Ukraine (formerly: USSR), into a musical family, Mykola studied at Kiev Specialized Music School and made his first public appearance at the age of eight. He later studied at Moscow Conservatory.

=== Pianist ===
Mykola Suk gained international recognition as the winner of the First Prize and Gold Medal at the 1971 International Liszt-Bartok Competition in Budapest, Hungary. Still very much attached to Liszt's music, he was called "the greatest present-day Liszt pianist" by former music critic for the New York Times, Joseph Horowitz. His international career has spanned four continents, performing in the most prestigious venues from the Great Hall of Moscow Conservatory to Lincoln Center's Alice Tully Hall and Carnegie Hall in New York.

Mr. Suk has given recitals in countries of the former Soviet Union, France, Germany, England, Finland, Egypt, Mexico, United States, Canada, Korea, China, Mongolia and Australia. He has appeared as soloist with numerous leading orchestras, from the Russian National Orchestra under Mikhail Pletnev to the Beethoven Orchestra Bonn under Roman Kofman. He has collaborated artistically with the world’s outstanding conductors, among them Charles Bruck, János Ferencsik, Arvid Jansons, Stefan Turchak, James DePreist and Carl St. Clair. His passion for chamber music has brought him to many distinguished chamber music festivals and collaborations throughout the world, among them, the Kuhmo Chamber Music Festival (Finland), Australian Festival of Chamber Music, Kiev International Music Festival (Ukraine) and International Keyboard Institute and Festival in New York City.

Mr. Suk is an avid believer in 20th and 21st century piano literature. He was honored to premiere numerous works, especially by Ukrainian composers such as Valentin Silvestrov, Ivan Karabyts and Myroslav Skoryk. Most of the compositions were composed for, dedicated to, or commissioned by Suk.

=== Pedagogue ===
Mykola Suk completed his Doctor of Musical Arts Degree in Piano Performance at the Moscow Conservatory, studying with Lev Vlassenko. He also holds a combined Bachelor/Master of Music Degree in Piano Performance, Pedagogy and Chamber Music from the Moscow State Conservatory. Before coming to the United States he served as professor of Piano at the Kiev State Conservatory and Moscow State Conservatory.

Mr. Suk has given master classes at many festivals and music schools around the world. He has taught as an adjunct faculty member at various music schools such as the New England Conservatory, Manhattan School of Music (NY), Columbia University (NY), and the University of Southern Alabama. In 2001, Mr. Suk settled in Las Vegas, Nevada, taking responsibility for keyboard studies at the Music Department of the University of Nevada, Las Vegas.

=== Recordings ===
Mykola Suk has recorded for the Melodya (Russia), Russian Disc, Hungaraton, Meldac/Triton (Japan), and Troppe Note/Cambria, Music & Arts (USA) labels.

== Cultural references ==
The following are some of the comments made about Mykola Suk's recent performances (both live and recorded):

“An astonishing blend of muscular power, poetry and utter control he will prove to be one of the more formidable talents to have appeared in this country in years”. “Suk is a powerhouse of a pianist who sets his own individual stamp on the Liszt Sonata. Although the lyrical elements are emphasized, there is little slighting of the muscular display sections...the more poetic passages are integrated into the structure.” (American Record Guide).

“...enormous digital control... such an impressive technique was so completely subsumed in the task of musical characterization. Suk never used the piano to show off; he made it the servant of Liszt’s expressive ideas” (Toronto Star).

“..surely the most towering and volcanic talent to have come out of Russia since Anton Rubinstein.” (The European Piano Teacher’s Journal).

“The recital opens with the Liszt Sonata that represents big piano-playing in its most positive, emotionally generous manifestation...Every so often an unusual voicing, phrase grouping or accent spices up the narrative flow, yet never for the sake of effect or novelty alone.” (Gramophone).

“These were thrilling interpretations, and one had the impression that he was only warming up.” (General-Anzeiger, Germany).

“Whether the tempestuously allegro or the leisurely adagio, the exuberant audience was entranced with the pianist’s superb artistry, exquisite style and perfect artistic performance.” (XiaMen Daily News, China).

“In the Ukraine, Mr. Suk was for many years a symbol of piano artistry... distinguished musicians still wonder at his ability to carefully and attentively approach many different styles and genres of music.” (Kommersant, Ukraine).

Reviewing his performance of Liszt, The Orange County Register noted Suk's technical clarity and dramatic interpretation

"If the angels ultimately won the evening, that was due in large part to pianist Mykola Suk, whose reading of the great B Minor Piano Sonata sidestepped granitic force and rhetorical showboating in favor of an introspection that hinted at the spiritual. Suk's solo playing in the irredeemably kitschy concerto "Totentanz" was also remarkably nuanced, its many iterations of the "Dies Irae" theme directed inward, rather than toward the balcony." (The Washington Post).

== Partial discography ==
- Mykola Suk — Pianist, Troppe Note/Cambria, 1996
- Ludwig van Beethoven: The Complete Violin Sonatas, Triton (DML Classics), 1999
  Collaboration with Oleh Krysa
- Mykola Suk Plays Liszt Piano Favorites, Music & Arts, 2009
