= Tartan Curtain =

The Tartan Curtain is a term of reference to the change in status of the Scottish border with England in the event that Scotland becomes an independent sovereign state, as supported by the Scottish National Party. It has also been used colloquially to refer to more general differences in policy between Scotland and England due to Scottish devolution. The term has been used in parliament, the press and in public discussions associated with Scottish Independence. It carries the negative connotations of the Iron Curtain which divided Europe during the Cold War. The term itself could relate to an Independent Scotland's physical border with the rest of the UK as well as differences in the currency and membership of international organisations such as NATO.

The constitutional consequences of a newly independent Scotland joining the European Union remain unclear, but if Scotland has to join the EU as a new member state it will not necessarily inherit the vetoes enjoyed by the rest of the United Kingdom. Part of the issue relates to the Schengen treaty, which allows free movement between European Union member states. The United Kingdom exercised an opt out from this treaty in order to maintain complete control over its own border.

The House of Commons Foreign Affairs Committee report entitled "The foreign policy implications of and for a separate Scotland" contains the following quote as Written evidence from the Foreign and Commonwealth Office: "The impact of an independent Scotland joining Schengen, were it to wish or be obliged to do so, would be significant, creating a UK land border with the Schengen area for the first time (the Republic of Ireland is not a member of Schengen)."
