= Péter Tóth (pianist) =

- Born: Péter Tóth; 1983 (age 42–43)
- Origin: Békéscsaba, Hungary (200km south-east of Budapest)
- Genre: Classical
- Occupation: Pianist
- Years active: 1994-present
- Website: Youtube.com/user/TothPianoPeter

Péter Tóth (born 1983 in Hungary) is a pianist and winner of the International Piano Competitions in Wittenberg (1997), Bovino (1998), International Franz Liszt Piano Competition in Weimar (2000) and in Budapest (2001). In 1998 he received the Liszt Academy’s “Sari Biro Memorial Award” as the best young pianist of the year.

== Early life ==
Toth started his musical studies at the Béla Bartók Music School in Békéscsaba under the guidance of Joseph Csontos when he was eleven years old. At thirteen he won a scholarship to the Franz Liszt Academy of Music in Budapest where he is still studying with Professor György Nádor and Balázs Réti, and with Adam Wibrowski in Paris. During his studies he has had several opportunities to gather experience on the international concert stage. Among others he has given concerts in the Concertgebouw in Amsterdam, in the Tchaikovsky Conservatory in Moscow, in France, Austria, and Japan, in the Czech Republic, in Belgium and in Germany. Toth is considered one of the most promising music talents in Hungary.

== Career ==
In 2005 he made his debut in Munich with a solo concert in the series "Piano Concerts in the Royal Residence". The Süddeutsche Zeitung wrote of his performance: "It is enormous, what this young Hungarian pianist is capable of ... a clever, plausible music with all the potential to grow and to mingle with the very best." Peter has performed with the Hungarian Virtuoso Chamber Orchestra, MATAV Symphony Orchestra and with the Franz Liszt Chamber Orchestra. He made recordings in 2004 in Scotland exclusively for Stockfisch Records, for whom he has recorded LATE PIANO WORKS OF LISZT. This CD recording has won the 2006 Grand Prix International Liszt du Disque Award by The Franz Liszt Society. The presentation of the awards will take place on October 22 in the Grand Hall of the Academy of Music in Budapest. In 2007 his concert took place in Munich, San Francisco, Kaiserslautern, and Brema.

== Discography ==
Tóth’s CD on Stockfisch Records, Late Piano Works of Liszt, was awarded the International Grand Prix du Disque Award from the Franz Liszt Society in 2006.
