= Concertgebouw de Vereeniging =

Concert hall in Nijmegen, Netherlands

Coordinates: 51°50′29″N 5°51′39″E

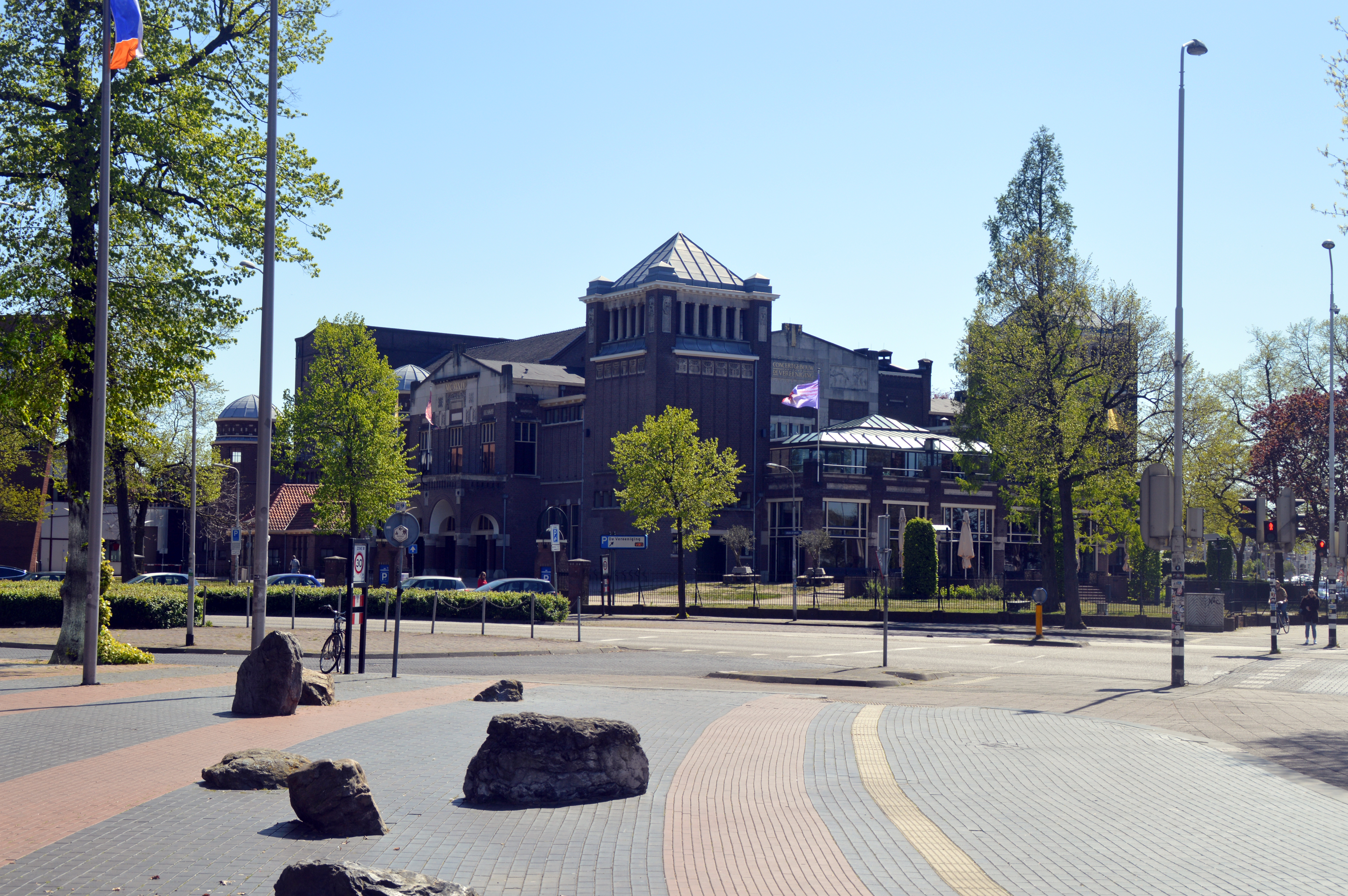

Concertgebouw de Vereeniging is a concert hall located in Nijmegen, Netherlands. The facility officially opened in 1915 and is built in a mixture of Art Nouveau and Art Deco styles. It has a capacity of 1,450 seats (or 1,800 standing people during pop concerts), and is renowned for its outstanding acoustics for orchestral music.

Concertgebouw de Vereeniging is a designated Rijksmonument.

== History ==
In 1882, the private society De Vereeniging was established with a concert hall at the Keizer Karelplein. Around 1900 the old Nijmegen concert hall turned out to have had its best time, plans were made for a new one. That these plans were not a superfluous luxury, was evident from the attitude of conductor Willem Mengelberg. He refused to visit Nijmegen any longer as long as nothing was done to the accommodation. After the construction of a new concert hall was started in 1914, the official opening took place in February 1915. The architect of the whole was Oscar Leeuw from Roermond. It took another two years before the small hall (Kleine Zaal) was opened. The Vereeniging had become a 'Gesamtkunstwerk', because both the architect Oscar Leeuw and his brother Henri Leeuw jr. (Painter and sculptor) had contributed. The figurative work was developed in Nijmegen by the painter Huib Luns and the Antwerp sculptor Egidius Everaerts, while the non-figurative work was made by the sculptor Jacques Oor.

Erected in strict, classically oriented Um 1800 forms. Various characteristics of Art Nouveau and Art Deco can be found in the building. Mengelberg is known to have found the building 'the most beautiful Concerthall in the Netherlands'. The great hall is known for its good acoustics. Other rooms in the building are the Entrance and Colonnade, the Keizer Karelfoyer, the Annazaal, the Sociëteitskamer, the Leeuwzaal and the Grand Café Restaurant. Originally the building would serve as a concert hall with opera or theater and as a ball or exhibition hall. The building is considered the 'opus magnum' of Oscar Leeuw's oeuvre.

== Gallery ==
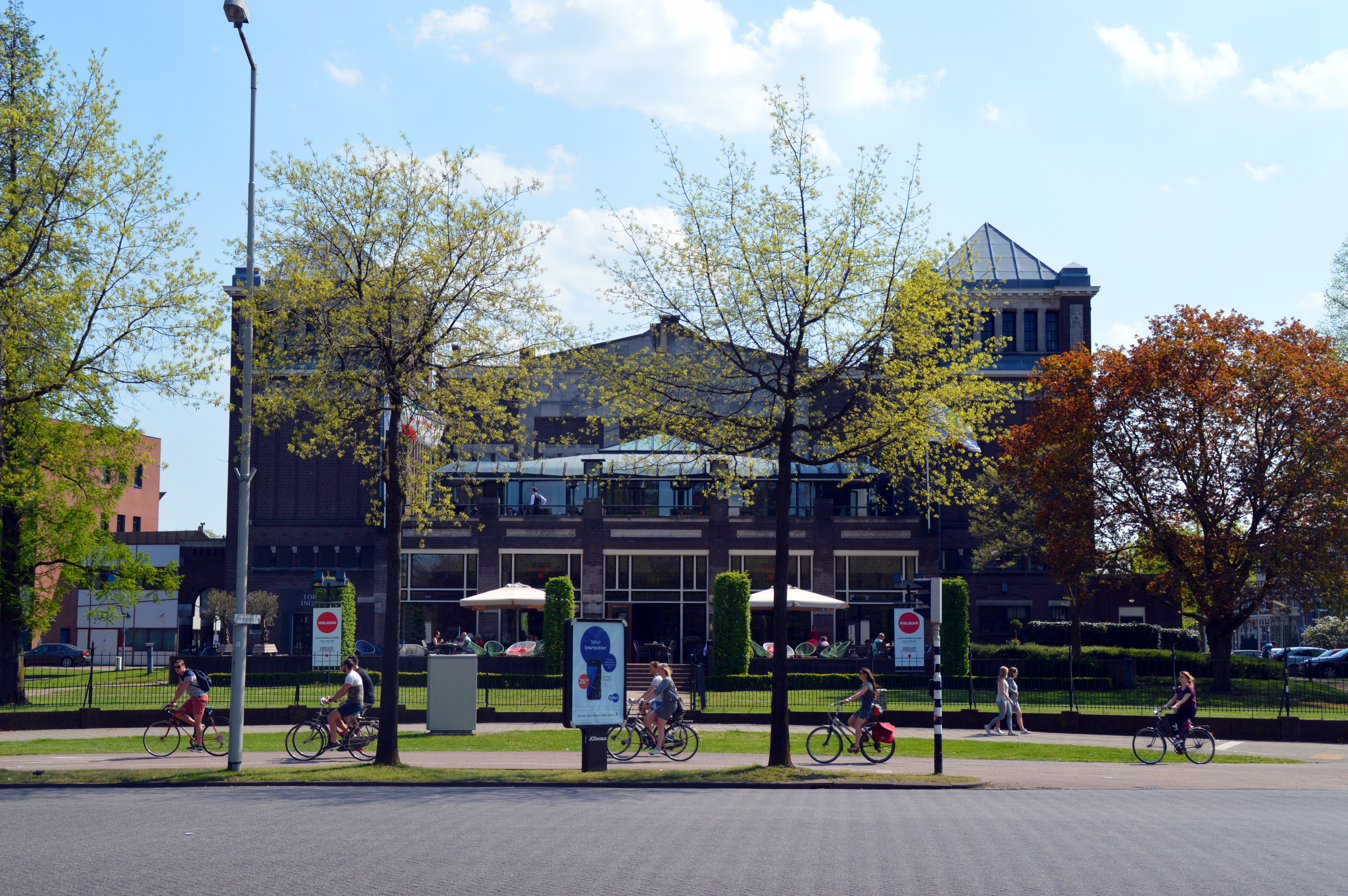

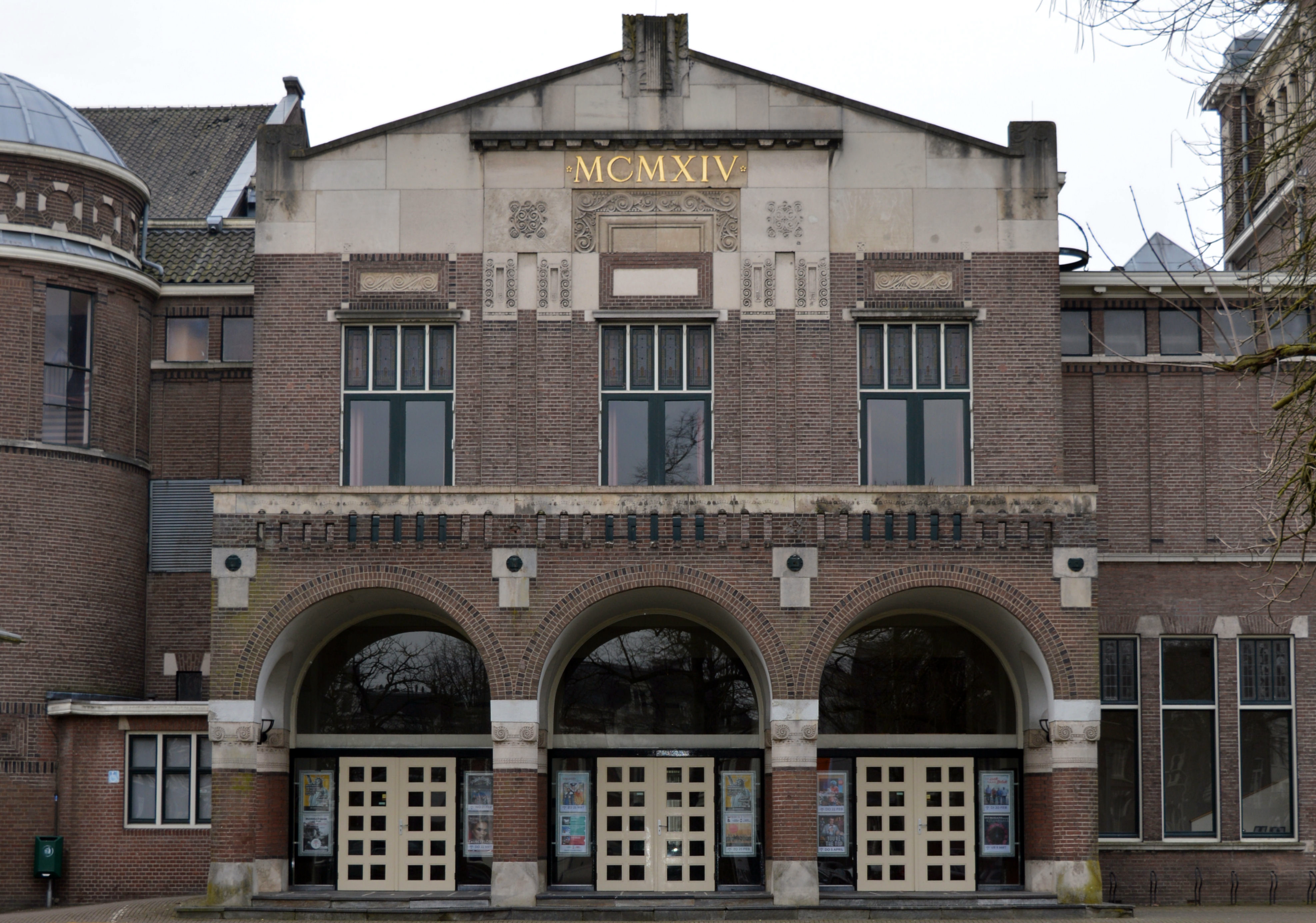
Entrance

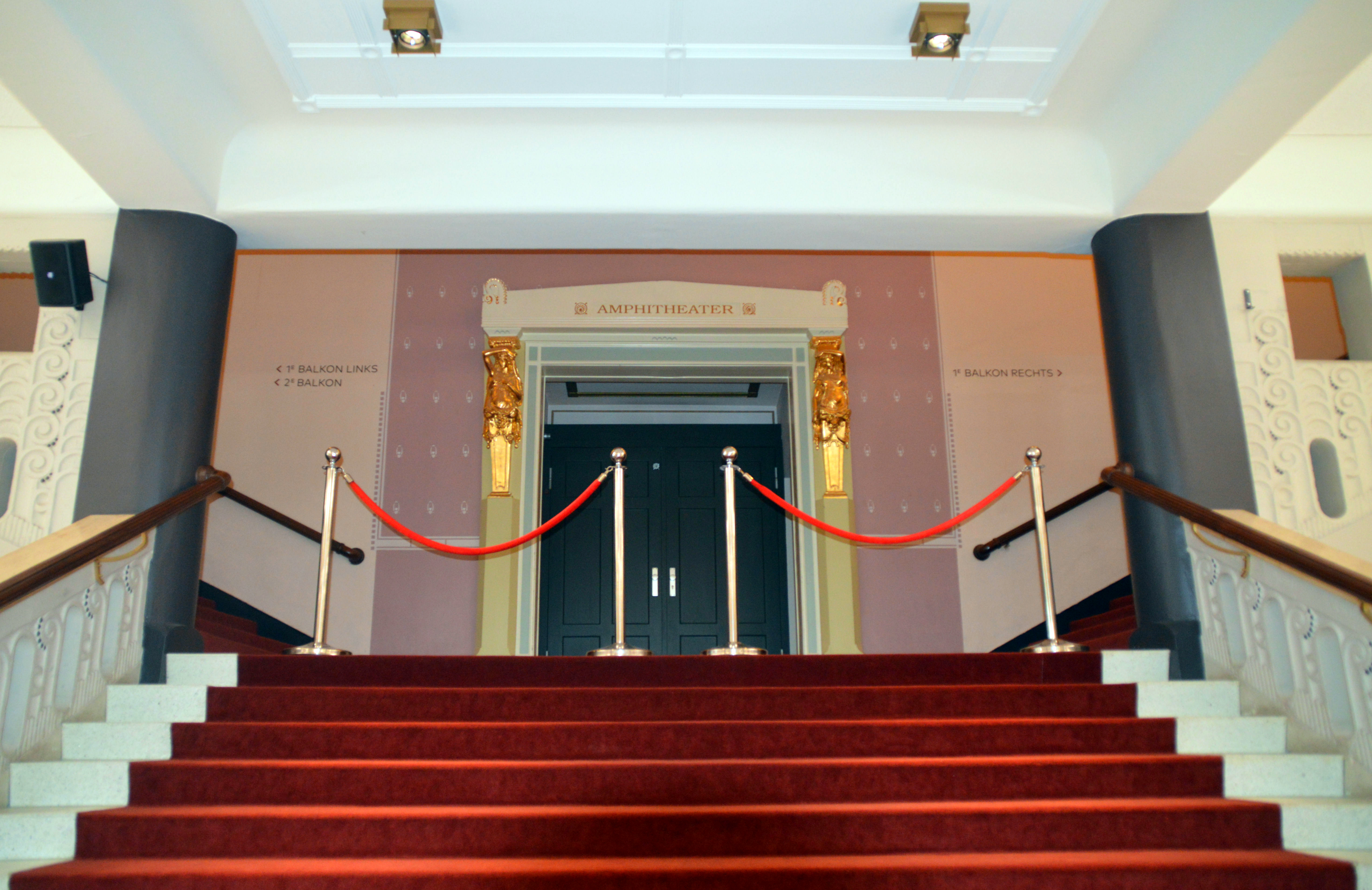
Stairs

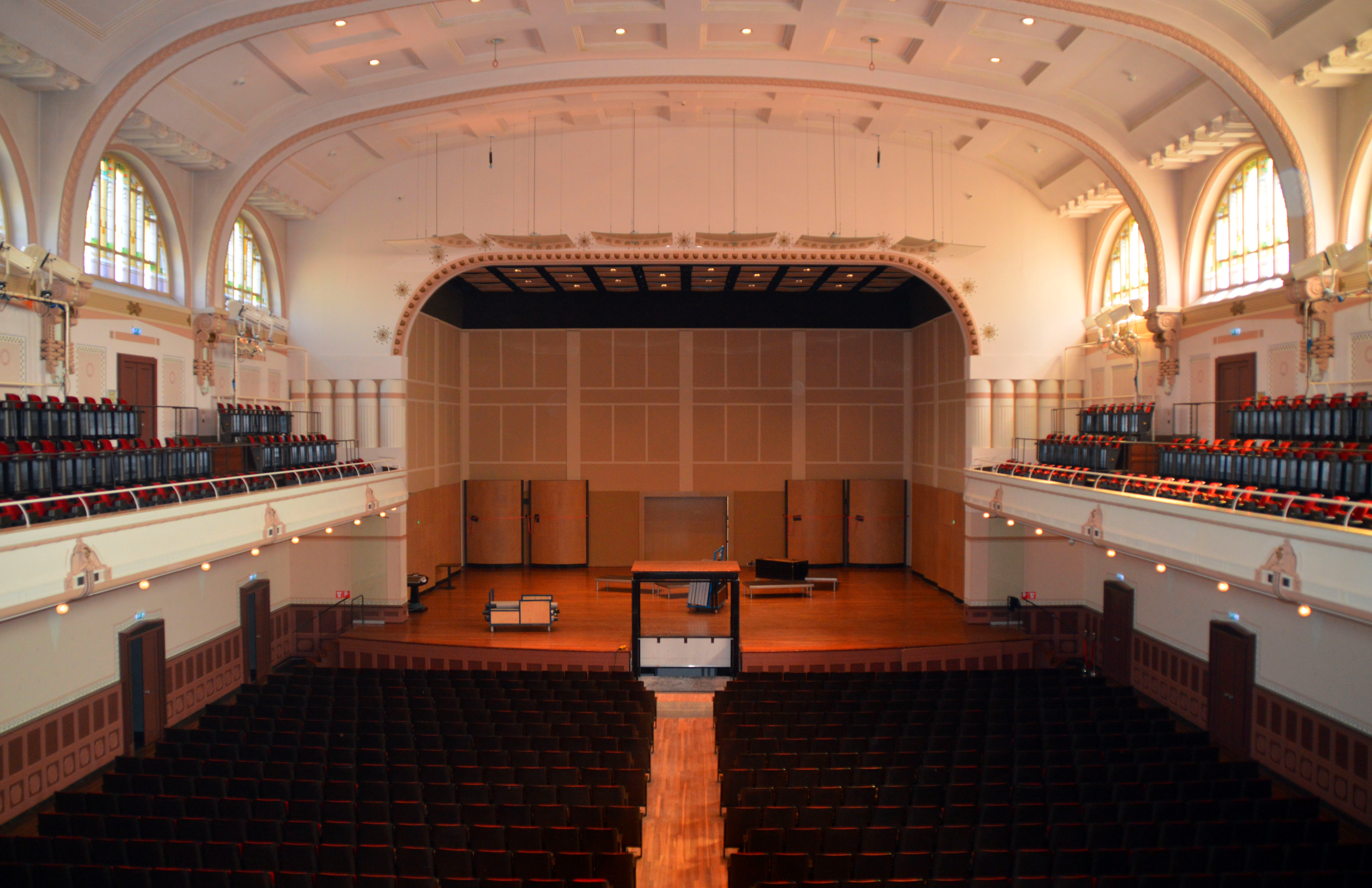
Great Hall

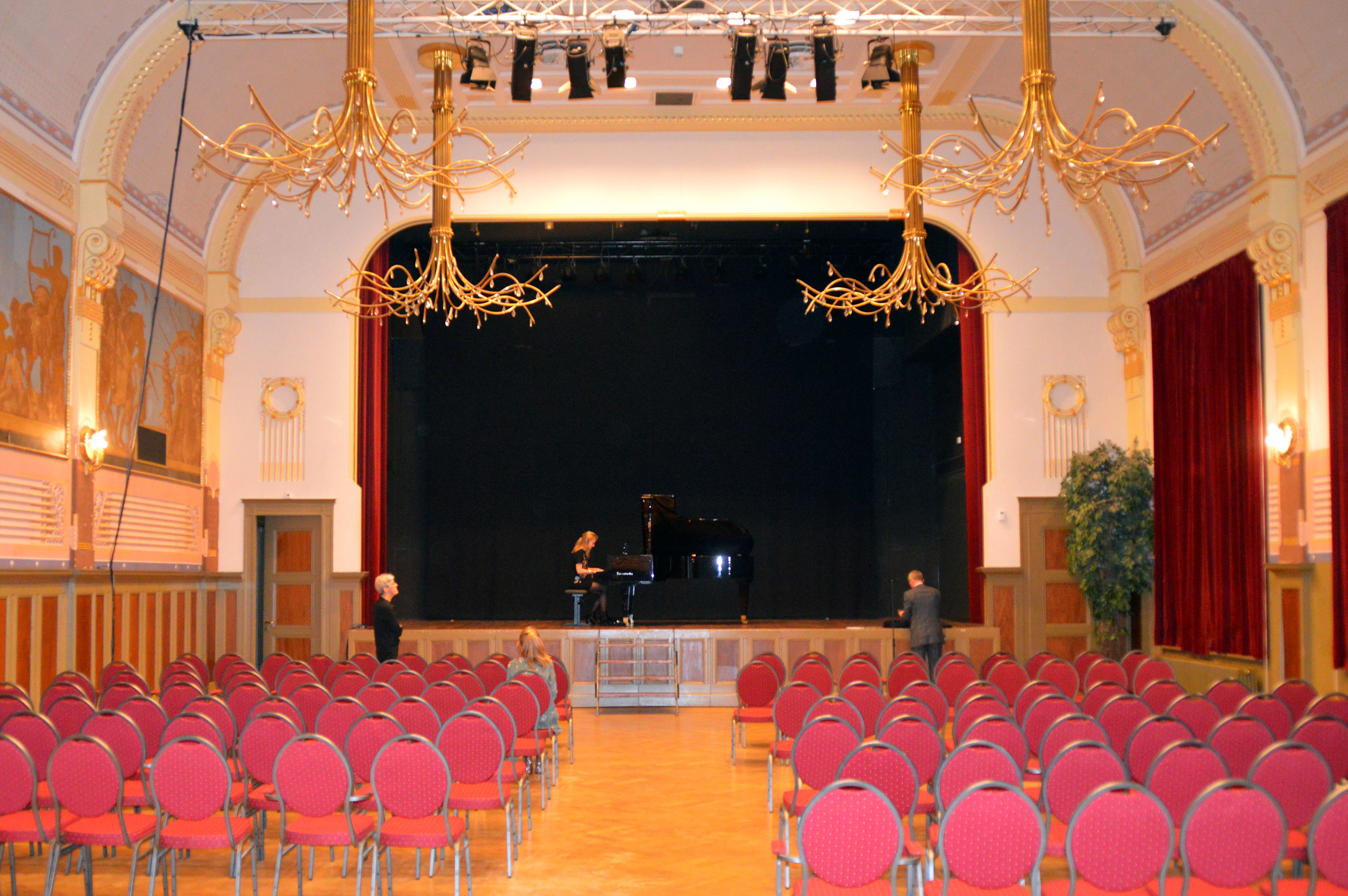
Small Hall

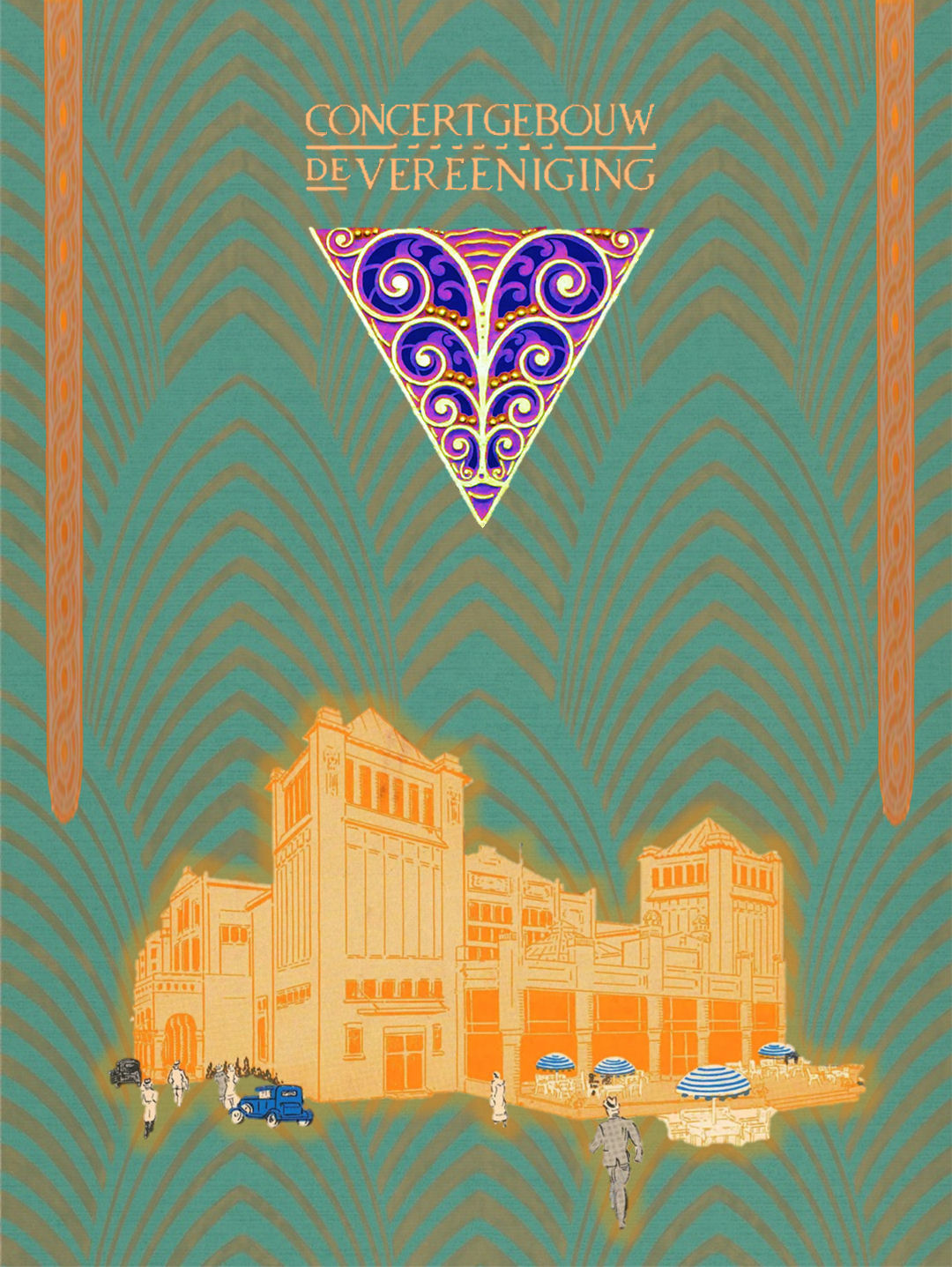
Art Deco Poster

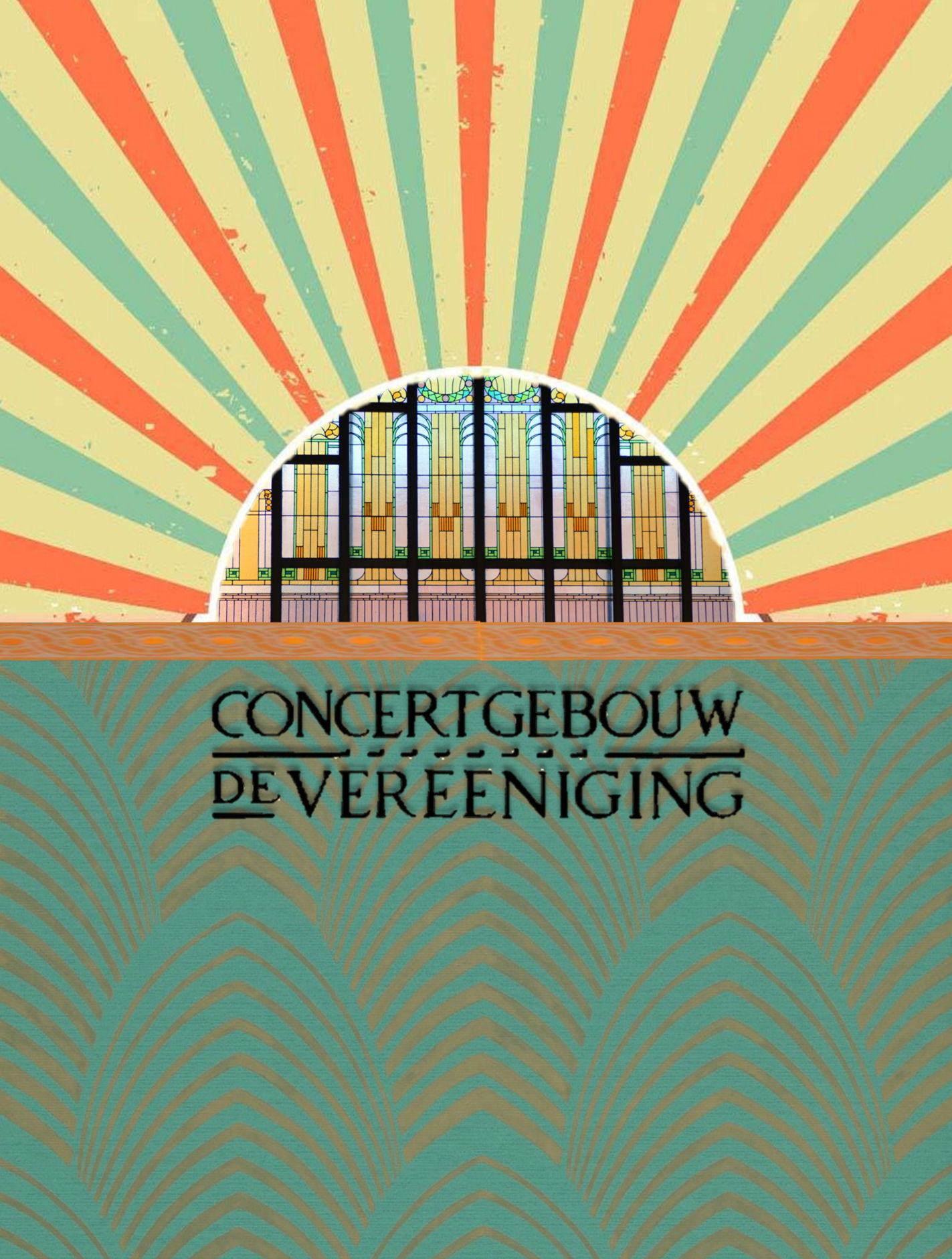
Art Deco Poster
