= Alexander Gibson (conductor) =

Scottish conductor (1926–1995)

Alexander Gibson CBE FRSE FRCM FRSA
- Born: Alexander Drummond Gibson; 11 February 1926; Motherwell, Scotland
- Died: 14 January 1995 (aged 68)
- Education: Royal Scottish Academy of Music and Drama; Royal College of Music
- Occupation: Conductor
- Known for: Longest serving principal conductor of the Scottish National Orchestra

Sir Alexander Drummond Gibson CBE FRSE FRCM FRSA (11 February 1926 – 14 January 1995) was a Scottish conductor and opera intendant. He was also well known for his service to the BBC and his achievements during his reign as the longest serving principal conductor of the Scottish National Orchestra in which the orchestra was awarded its royal patronage.

== Biography ==
Gibson was born in Motherwell, Scotland, in 1926 and was brought up in the village of New Stevenston, the son of James McClure Gibson and his wife Wilhelmina Williams.

He was introduced to professional opera at the age of 12 when his parents took him to a performance of Madam Butterfly at the Theatre Royal in Glasgow. He was educated at Dalziel High School. He excelled at the piano and organ, and at 18 became the organist at Hillhead Congregational Church, Glasgow while studying music at the Royal Scottish Academy of Music and Drama in Glasgow. In 1943, he matriculated at the University of Glasgow to study Music and English. After his first year, however, the war interrupted his studies and he served with the Royal Signals Band until 1948, when he took up a scholarship to the Royal College of Music in London, after which he studied at the Mozarteum, Salzburg under Igor Markevitch, and under Paul Van Kempen at the Accademia Chigiana, Siena.

Gibson was Assistant Conductor of the BBC Scottish Symphony Orchestra 1952–54 and conducted two productions for the amateur Glasgow Grand Opera Society in 1954. At the time of his appointment in 1957 as musical director of Sadler's Wells, he was the youngest ever to have taken that position. He met his wife Veronica at Sadler's Wells and they married in 1958.

Returning to Glasgow, in 1959 he became the first Scottish principal conductor and artistic director of the Scottish National Orchestra, a post he held until 1984, to date longer than any other conductor. Under his leadership the orchestra built an international reputation through recordings and foreign tours and appeared regularly in the SNO Proms in Glasgow, in Edinburgh International Festival, where he also created the Edinburgh Festival Chorus, and in London at The Proms.

Gibson created and launched Scottish Opera in 1962 and was its music director until 1986. Through his artistic achievements the Theatre Royal, Glasgow, was bought from Scottish Television and transformed in 1975 to be the first national opera house in Scotland, and the home theatre of Scottish Opera and of Scottish Ballet, and from 1980 the Scottish Theatre Company. In 1987, Gibson was appointed conductor laureate of Scottish Opera and held this title for the remainder of his life. From 1981 to 1983, he was also principal guest conductor of the Houston Symphony Orchestra. He was principal conductor of the Guildford Philharmonic. During his career, he made guest appearances with all the major British orchestras and extensively throughout Europe, Australia, the Americas, Hong Kong and Japan.

== Honours ==
Gibson's many awards include two Grand Prix International de l'Academie Charles Cros Awards, the Sibelius Medal in 1978, and honorary doctorates from the universities of Aberdeen, Glasgow, Newcastle, Stirling, York and the Open. He was appointed a Commander of the Order of the British Empire (CBE) in 1967, was created a Knight Bachelor in 1977 and became president of the Royal Scottish Academy of Music and Drama, where in his memory, the Alexander Gibson School of Opera was opened in 1998. It is the first purpose-built opera school in Great Britain.

Gibson had a particular affinity for Scandinavian music, particularly Jean Sibelius, whose work he recorded several times, and Carl Nielsen. He was awarded Finland's Sibelius Medal in recognition of his distinguished service to the composer's music. He was strongly committed to contemporary music and in 1961 he founded a new music festival in Glasgow originally called Musica Viva, later Musica Nova Festival, Glasgow. Among the many important premieres he conducted there was the first British performance of Gruppen by Karlheinz Stockhausen, in 1961. He was also a constant advocate of new music by Scottish composers. In the opera house, he was regarded as a particularly fine interpreter of Mozart and Wagner, conducting the complete Ring des Nibelungen with Scottish Opera in 1971. He was equally at home in the Italian repertoire. In 1969, he conducted a memorable Scottish Opera production of Les Troyens by Berlioz – the first ever complete performance of both parts of the opera in one evening.

Gibson was the recipient of the 1970 St Mungo Prize, awarded to the individual who has done most in the previous three years to improve and promote the city of Glasgow.

== Death ==
Sir Alexander Gibson died in January 1995 from complications following a heart attack. He was 68. He was survived by his wife Veronica and their four children.

== Legacy ==
Sir Alexander Gibson's mission was to make classical music and opera accessible to all, and throughout his career he devotedly encouraged musicians and singers to rise to the very best of their abilities. His discography is detailed in the biography of him by Conrad Wilson, as are the numerous premieres, concert works and operas he conducted. In the Theatre Royal, Glasgow there is a lofty portrait of him in the orchestra pit perched on a stool, painted by David Donaldson, the Queen's Limner in Scotland, and a bust of him as conductor by the sculptor Archie Forrest. A street in his home town of Motherwell is named Alexander Gibson Way in his honour.

== Sources ==
Cultural offices
Preceded by James Robertson	Music Director, Sadler's Wells; 1957–1959	Succeeded by Colin Davis
Preceded by none	Music Director, Scottish Opera; 1962–1986	Succeeded by John Mauceri
