= Kikau (disambiguation) =

Kikau is a species of bird endemic to Fiji.

Kikau may also refer to:

- Kikau (island), an island in the northern group of the Cook Islands
- RFNS Kikau (202), a patrol boat operated by Fiji

== People ==
- Jone Kikau, (died 1984), a Fijian chief, civil servant and politician
- Viliame Kikau, (born 1995), a Fijian professional rugby league footballer
