= Freddie Plaskett =

British soldier

Major-General Freddie Plaskett CB MBE
- Born: 23 October 1926
- Died: 1 September 2018 (aged 91)
- Military career
- Allegiance: United Kingdom
- Branch: British Army
- Rank: Major-General
- Commands: Royal Corps of Transport
- Conflicts: Malayan Emergency

Major-General Frederick Joseph Plaskett CB MBE (23 October 1926 – 1 September 2018) was a British Army officer who was later chief executive of the British Road Haulage Association until 1988 and colonel commandant of the Royal Corps of Transport from 1981 to 1991.

Plaskett was appointed a Member of the Order of the British Empire in the 1967 New Year Honours, a Companion of the Order of the Bath (CB) in the 1980 Birthday Honours,
