= 1980 Birthday Honours =

British government recognitions

The Queen's Birthday Honours 1980 were appointments in many of the Commonwealth realms of Queen Elizabeth II to various orders and honours to reward and highlight good works by citizens of those countries. The appointments were made to celebrate the official birthday of the Queen. They were published on 13 June 1980 for the United Kingdom and Colonies, Australia, New Zealand, Mauritius, Fiji, Bahamas, Papua New Guinea, Solomon Islands, Tuvalu, Saint Lucia, and Saint Vincent and the Grenadines.

The recipients of honours are displayed here as they were styled before their new honour, and arranged by honour, with classes (Knight, Knight Grand Cross, etc.) and then divisions (Military, Civil, etc.) as appropriate.

== United Kingdom and Colonies ==
=== Baron (Life Peers) ===
- Thomas Gray Boardman, MC TD DL, lately President, Association of British Chambers of Commerce. Former Member of Parliament for Leicester South.
- Sir Francis Scott McFadzean, Chairman, Rolls-Royce Ltd. Former Chairman, Shell Transport & Trading Co. Ltd.
- Sir Frank Shaw Marshall. For political and public service.
- Victor Collin Matthews, Deputy Chairman and Chief Executive, Trafalgar House Ltd.
- Sir Arnold Weinstock, Managing Director, General Electric Co. Ltd.

=== Privy Councillor ===
- Henry Paul Guinness Channon, MP, Minister of State, Civil Service Department; Member of Parliament for Southend West.
- Sir Arthur Antony Duff, GCMG CVO DSO DSC, Foreign & Commonwealth Office.

=== Knight Bachelor ===
- Edward Penley Abraham, CBE. Professor of Chemical Pathology, University of Oxford.
- Edward Anthony John Alment, President, Royal College of Obstetricians and Gynaecologists.
- Joseph Franklin Madders Braithwaite, Chairman, Baker Perkins Holdings Ltd. For services to export.
- Frederick Frank Arthur Burden, MP, for political and public service.
- Wilfred Burns, CB CBE, Chief Planner and Deputy Secretary, Department of the Environment.
- Albert Percy Costain, MP. For political and public service.
- James William Donald Crane, CBE, HM Chief Inspector of Constabulary.
- Philip Manning Dowson, CBE, Senior Partner, Ove Arup Partnership. For services to architecture.
- The Right Honourable Hugh Charles Patrick Joseph Fraser, MBE MP, for political and public service.
- Roger Thomas Baldwin Fulford, CVO, for political and public service.
- David John Davenport-Handley, OBE DL. For political and public service in the East Midlands.
- Professor Alan James Harris, CBE, Senior Partner, Harris & Sutherland. For services to civil engineering.
- Jack William Hughes, Chairman, Bracknell Development Corporation.
- Albert Lamb, Editor, The Sun.
- Robert Leslie Edward Lawrence, CBE ERD, Chairman, National Freight Corporation.
- John Godfray Le Quesne, QC, Chairman, Monopolies & Mergers Commission.
- George Robin Perronet MacLellan, CBE, lately Chairman, Scottish Tourist Board.
- Peter Meinertzhagen, CMG, General Manager, Commonwealth Development Corporation.
- John Moores, CBE. For charitable services.
- Walter Fraser Oakeshott. For services to medieval literature.
- Ronald Hugh Owen, lately Chairman, Prudential Assurance Co. Ltd.
- Austin William Pearce, CBE, lately Chairman, Esso Petroleum Co. Ltd.
- Sydney Plaister, CBE. For political service in the West Midlands.
- Joseph Albert Pope. For public services in the West Midlands.
- David Ernest Campbell Price, MP. For political and public service.
- Major-General Francis Brian Wyldbore-Smith, CB DSO OBE, for political service.
- John Chalmer Stebbings, President of The Law Society.
- Professor Michael George Parke Stoker, CBE. Foreign Secretary, the Royal Society. For services to cancer research.
- Rawden John Afamado Temple, CBE QC, Chief Social Security Commissioner.
- James Ian Raley Trethowan, Director General, British Broadcasting Corporation.
- Graham John Wilkins, Chairman and Chief Executive, Beecham Group Ltd. For services to export.
- Angus Wilson, CBE, (Professor Angus Frank Johnstone-Wilson), Author.

Diplomatic Service & Overseas List

- Alan Armstrong Huggins, Senior Justice of Appeal, Hong Kong.

Australian States

State of Victoria

- The Honourable Mr. Justice Kevin Victor Anderson, of Toorak. For service to the law.
- John Vincent Dillon, CMG, of Prahran East. For public service.
- Philip John Rupert Steele, of Toorak. For service to horse racing.

State of Queensland

- John Joseph Rowell, CBE, of St. Lucia. For service to the legal profession and the community.
- Edward Jackson Stewart, of Ascot. For service to business, charity and horse racing.

State of South Australia

- Samuel Benson Dickinson, of College Park. For services to the mining industry.

State of Western Australia

- James Winter Cruthers, of Floreat Park. For services to television, the arts and the community.

=== Order of the Bath ===
==== Knight Grand Cross of the Order of the Bath (GCB) ====
Military Division

Royal Navy

- Admiral Sir Richard Clayton, KCB ADC.

Royal Air Force

- Air Chief Marshal Sir Alasdair Steedman, KCB CBE DFC.

==== Knight Commander of the Order of the Bath (KCB) ====
Military Division

Royal Navy

- Vice Admiral William Thomas Pillar.
- Vice Admiral Thomas Henry Eustace Baird.
- Lieutenant General John Charles Chisholm Richards, Royal Marines.

Army

- Major General John Hugh Bevil Acland, CBE, (397794), late Scots Guards.

Royal Air Force

- Acting Air Marshal Charles Ernest Ness, CB CBE.

Civil Division

- Arthur John Boreham, CB Director, Central Statistical Office, Cabinet Office.
- Professor Ronald Mason, Chief Scientific Adviser, Ministry of Defence.
- Kenneth Ronald Stowe, CB CVO, Permanent Secretary, Northern Ireland Office.

==== Companion of the Order of the Bath (CB) ====
Military Division

Royal Navy

- Rear Admiral Anthony John Cooke.
- Rear Admiral Bryan John Straker, OBE
- Rear Admiral Charles Bernard Williams, OBE
- Surgeon Rear Admiral (D) Brian Frederick Rogers.

Army

- Major General Alistair Andrew Gibson Anderson (370575), late Royal Corps of Signals.
- Major General Martin Baker Farndale (397237), late Royal Regiment of Artillery.
- Major General John Antony McIlvenna (176390), Army Legal Corps.
- Major General Frederick Joseph Plaskett, MBE (376103), late Royal Corps of Transport.
- Major General Timothy Stuart Champion Streatfeild, MBE (369843), late Royal Regiment of Artillery.
- Major General Michael John Hatley Walsh, DSO. (364588), late the Parachute Regiment.

Royal Air Force

- Air Vice-Marshal Peter Robin Harding.
- Air Vice-Marshal Michael William Patrick Knight, AFC.
- Air Commodore Pamela Joy Tamblin, WRAF (Ret'd).

Civil Division

- James Fleming Boyd, Deputy Secretary, Board of Inland Revenue.
- Alexander Cosens Lindsay Brown, Chief Veterinary Officer, Ministry of Agriculture, Fisheries & Food.
- William Gordon Chalmers, MC, Crown Agent for Scotland.
- Geoffrey Fairfax Cockerill, Secretary, University Grants Committee.
- John Anthony Cradock, MBE. Principal Director, Ministry of Defence.
- Edward Norman Eden, Under Secretary, Department of Trade.
- Graeme Frank Gloak, Solicitor, Board of Customs & Excise.
- Peter John Harrop, Deputy Secretary, Cabinet Office.
- John Murray Hunter, MC, Commissioner For Administration and Finance, Forestry Commission.
- Anne Elisabeth Mueller Robertson, Deputy Secretary, Department of Industry.
- Douglas Robertson Nicoll, Foreign & Commonwealth Office.
- George Mark Parbury, Chief Registrar of the High Court of Justice in Bankruptcy.
- Michael Edward Quinlan, Deputy Secretary, Ministry of Defence.
- John Ellerslie Sanderson, Under Secretary, Department of Transport.
- John Douglas Semken, MC, Legal Adviser, Home Office.
- Percy Arthur Sythes, Comptroller and Auditor General, Northern Ireland.
- Robert John Thornton, Under Secretary, Ministry of Defence.
- Edward Leslie Trew, Under Secretary, Department of Health & Social Security.

Australian States

State of Victoria

- Daryl Michael Dawson, QC, of North Melbourne. For public service.

State of Queensland

- Keith Spann, CVO, of Chermside West, Permanent Head of the Department of the Premier and Cabinet.

=== Order of Saint Michael & Saint George ===
==== Knight Grand Cross of the Order of St Michael and St George (GCMG) ====
- Sir Michael Wilford, KCMG, HM Ambassador, Tokyo.

==== Knight Commander of the Order of St Michael and St George (KCMG) ====
- Gordon Booth, CMG, CVO, lately Director-General, British Trade Development Office, New York.
- Henry Arthur Hugh Cortazzi, CMG, Foreign & Commonwealth Office.
- Percy Cradock, CMG, H.M. Ambassador, Peking.

==== Companion of the Order of St Michael and St George (CMG) ====
- Hugh Reginald Braden, Assistant Secretary, Ministry of Defence.
- Michael de Normann Ensor, OBE, Assistant Secretary, Overseas Development Administration.
- Ronald Archer Campbell Byatt, British High Commissioner, Salisbury.
- Colin Malcolm Carruthers, lately Office of the Governor, Salisbury.
- William John Richard Dawson, OBE, Foreign & Commonwealth Office.
- Nicholas Maxted Fenn, lately Office of the Governor, Salisbury.
- Richard Alwynne Fyjis-Walker, CVO, H.M. Ambassador, Khartoum.
- Mark Evelyn Heath, H.M. Minister to the Holy See.
- Peter Charles Petrie, Minister (Economic), H.M. Embassy, Paris.
- Thomas Russell, CBE, Governor, Cayman Islands.
- Kenneth Bertram Adam Scott, Minister and Deputy Permanent Representative, United Kingdom Delegation to NATO, Brussels.
- John Burns Ure, MVO, H.M. Ambassador, Havana.
- Arthur Hope Wyatt, Counsellor (Commercial), H.M. Embassy, Tehran.

Australian States

State of Victoria

- Colin Keon-Cohen, OBE, of Toorak. For service to returned servicemen.

State of Queensland

- Archibald James McDonald, of Cloncurry. For services to the community.

State of Western Australia

- Honourable Graham Charles MacKinnon, MLC, of Bunbury. For political and public service.

=== Royal Victorian Order ===
==== Dame Grand Cross of the Royal Victorian Order (GCVO) ====
- The Most Noble Ann Fortune, Duchess of Grafton.

==== Knight Commander of the Royal Victorian Order (KCVO) ====
- Vice Admiral Sir Peter William Beckwith Ashmore, KCB MVO DSC.
- Arthur James Robert Collins, CVO.
- Neville Egerton Leigh, CVO.

==== Commander of the Royal Victorian Order (CVO) ====
- The Honourable John Francis Harcourt Baring.
- The Right Honourable Esmé Mary Gabriel, The Countess of Cromer.
- Richard Hugh Buller Hamersley, MVO.
- Lieutenant Commander Arthur John Arundell Holdsworth, OBE Royal Navy.
- Major Raymond MacLaran, MVO.
- Commander George John Manson, CD, Royal Canadian Navy (Ret'd).

==== Member of the Royal Victorian Order, 4th class (MVO) ====
- Captain Jeremy John Mainwaring-Burton, Irish Guards.
- Peter James Dingle.
- Fiona Henderson.
- David Gordon Illingworth.
- Violet Margaret McGhee.
- Lieutenant Colonel Joseph Brian Mylchreest, OBE TD JP.
- Anne Mary Neal, MVO.
- Dorothy Joan Stephens, MBE.
- John Robert Whitbread.
- Squadron Leader Geoffrey Hector Williams, Royal Air Force.

==== Member of the Royal Victorian Order, 5th class (MVO) ====
- Squadron Leader Malcolm Stanley Bartlett, Royal Air Force.
- Elfed Morris Bowen.
- John Clench.
- Frances Dimond.
- Margaret Elizabeth Graham.
- Gerald Stanley Harman.
- Carlo Gerald Terry.
- Chief Yeoman Warder Leslie Varley, MBE.

=== Royal Victorian Medal ===
In Silver

- Stanley Edward Berresford.
- Ronald Eric Brown.
- Henry William Butcher.
- John Davidson.
- Victor Alan Doel.
- T0683445 Flight Sergeant Ivor Edwin Hawkins, Royal Air Force.
- Divisional Sergeant Major Alfred Frederick Hedditch, MBE, the Queen's Bodyguard of the Yeomen of the Guard.
- Chief Marine Engineering Mechanic (Electrical) Francis William Kirby, M933349J.
- Michael Perry.
- Frederic Charles Scallan.
- Ernest Anthony Skelton.
- Yeoman Bed Goer Alfred Warren, the Queen's Bodyguard of the Yeomen of the Guard.

==== Bar to the Royal Victorian Medal ====
In Silver

- Ernest George Hatcher.
- Robert Geddes Macdonald.

=== Order of the Companions of Honour (CH) ===
- The Right Honourable Arthur Christopher John, Baron Soames, GCMG GCVO CBE. For public service, particularly in connection with Rhodesia.

=== Order of the British Empire ===
==== Dame Commander of the Order of the British Empire (DBE) ====
Civil Division

- The Right Honourable Mary, Baroness Soames, MBE. For public service, particularly in connection with Rhodesia.
- Ann Marcella Springman, OBE. For political and public service.

==== Knight Commander of the Order of the British Empire (KBE) ====
Military Division

Royal Navy

- Vice Admiral Roy William Halliday, DSC.
- Vice Admiral Peter William Buchanan.

Army

- Lieutenant General David Tod Young, CB DFC, (354597), Colonel, The Royal Scots (The Royal Regiment); General Officer Commanding Scotland and Governor of Edinburgh Castle (Designate).

Civil Division

Diplomatic Service & Overseas List

- Dr. David Arthur Davies, lately Secretary-General World Meteorological Organization, Geneva.

Australian States

State of Victoria

- Professor Joseph Terence Burke, CBE, of Mount Dandenong. For service to the Arts.

==== Commander of the Order of the British Empire (CBE) ====
Military Division

Royal Navy

- Captain Richard Durnford Franklin.
- Captain Robin John Pashley Heath.
- Captain Stanley George Morgan, MVO.
- Captain Robert Kenneth Alcock, ADC.
- Captain John Desmond Fisher, Royal Fleet Auxiliary Service.

Army

- Brigadier John William Bridge (413758), late Corps of Royal Engineers.
- Brigadier John Lyon Chapple, MBE, (410821), late 2nd King Edward VII's Own Gurkha Rifles (The Sirmoor Rifles).
- Colonel Peter Edmond, QHS TD DL, (466168), late Royal Army Medical Corps, Territorial Army.
- Brigadier John Nicholas Ghika (416335), late Irish Guards.
- Colonel (Local Brigadier) Adam Brampton Douglas Gurdon, OBE, (410449), late the Black Watch (Royal Highland Regiment).
- Brigadier John Hartley Learmont, OBE, (433171), late Royal Regiment of Artillery.
- Colonel Laurence Anthony Wallis New (424419), late Royal Tank Regiment.

Royal Air Force

- Air Commodore Eric Warren Coburn, (Retired).
- Air Commodore John Lawson Field.
- Group Captain George Earl Ord, OBE.
- Group Captain David Anderson Toon.

Civil Division

- Jeffery Heaton Aldam, MC, County Education Officer, Hampshire.
- Duncan Hubert David Alexander, OBE TD DL. For public service in South Wales.
- William Alexander Allen, Senior Partner, Bickerdike Allen Partners.
- John Russell Anderson, Professor of Pathology, University of Glasgow.
- Stanley George Barnett, DL. For political and public service in Eastern England.
- Thomas Robert Barron, Member, British Railways Board.
- Donald Angus Philip Barry, OBE, Chairman, Parole Board for Scotland.
- William Edwin Bell, Regional Co-ordinator Middle East, Shell International Petroleum Co. Ltd.
- Norman Alexander Best, Leader, Southampton City Council.
- Eric Latham Beverley, DFC, Group Commercial Director, British Aerospace Dynamics Group.
- Frederick Richard Brown, MBE. For services to Cricket.
- David John Bryant, MBE. For services to Bowls.
- John Henry Burgoyne, lately Chairman, Committee of Enquiry into Offshore Safety.
- Leslie Thompson Carnegie, Chief Executive, Dumfries and Galloway Regional Council.
- Anthony Arthur Leonard Challis, Director of Polymer Engineering Directorate, Science Research Council.
- George Frederick Chambers, lately Chief Engineer, Department of the Environment for Northern Ireland.
- Edward Frank Choppen, Chairman, Petroleum Industry Training Board.
- Maurice Clark, Assistant Chief Valuer, Board of Inland Revenue.
- Thomas Clarke. For services to local government in Scotland.
- David Cramb, lately Chairman, Cake & Biscuit Alliance Ltd.
- Peter Leslie Crill, Deputy Bailiff for Jersey.
- Spencer Crookenden, MC, Chairman, K Shoes Ltd.
- Bernard Crossland, Professor of Mechanical Engineering, Queen's University, Belfast.
- Colonel William Alexander Dalziel, TD DL. For political and public service in Scotland.
- James Patton Davidson, Chairman, Clyde Port Authority.
- Margaret Drabble, Writer.
- Robert William Simpson Easton, Chairman and Chief Executive, Yarrow (Shipbuilders) Ltd. For services to export.
- Jack Fleming Eccles, Regional Secretary (Lancashire), National Union of General & Municipal Workers.
- Albert Ernest Evetts, Group Manufacturing Director, Lucas Industries Ltd. For services to export.
- James Dennis Compton Faulkner, VRD, Chairman, Northern Ireland Development Agency.
- The Honourable Francis Forman Fisher, MC, Master, Wellington College.
- Adolf Frankel, Chairman, Staveley Industries Ltd. For services to export.
- Michael Francis Gilbert, TD. For political service.
- George Godwin, President, Martonair International Ltd. For services to export.
- Alec Green, BEM, Assistant Secretary, Department for National Savings.
- Ronald Gregory, QPM DL, Chief Constable, West Yorkshire Metropolitan Police.
- Geoffrey John Hadfield, TD, Consultant General Surgeon, Stoke Mandeville Hospital, Buckinghamshire.
- Donald Hardwick, Chairman, Steel Division, Johnson & Firth Brown Ltd.
- Stanley Frank Heather, Comptroller and City Solicitor, Corporation of London.
- Roy Lionel Helmore, Principal, Cambridgeshire College of Arts and Technology.
- Gordon Frederick Hendry, Assistant Secretary, Scottish Office.
- Janie Gardner Morris Heppell, Chairman, Northumberland Area Health Authority.
- Professor Robert Charles Heritage. For services to furniture design.
- Arthur Alfred Hill. For political and public service in the West Midlands.
- Cecil Herbert William Hodges, Assistant Secretary, HM Treasury.
- Geraldine Elizabeth Mary Scott-Hopkins. For political service in the East Midlands.
- Albert Habib Hourani. For services to Anglo-Middle East Relations.
- Alastair Stuart Laing, MVO, Deputy Director-General, Commonwealth War Graves Commission.
- William Charles Leech. For charitable services.
- Professor Dennis Samuel Lees, Chairman, National Insurance Advisory Committee.
- Professor Hermann Lehmann. For services to clinical biochemistry.
- James Walker-Love, Deputy Chairman, Meat & Livestock Commission.
- Lilian Louise Lowne, Assistant Secretary, Department of Industry.
- Jacqueline Lois Douglas Lysaght. For political and public service in Wales.
- Murdo Donald Macleod, lately Assistant Controller, Home Office.
- Frederick (Francis) Alexander Mann. For services to international law.
- Peter Lewis Martin, Partner, the Oscar Faber Partnership.
- Professor Charles William Noel Miles, Chairman, Agricultural Wages Board for England & Wales.
- The Very Reverend William Fenton Morley, Chairman, Church of England Pensions Board.
- Frank Osman Morris, General Secretary, Working Men's Club and Institute Union Ltd.
- George Morrison, QFSM, Chief Fire Officer, Fire Authority for Northern Ireland.
- John Farbon Moultrie, Leader, Havering London Borough Council.
- Frank Herbert Muir, writer and broadcaster.
- Geoffrey Claude Nichols, OBE DFC, Chairman, Rotaprint Ltd. For services to export.
- Denis Norden, writer and broadcaster.
- Victor John Osola, Group Chief Executive, Redman Heenan International Ltd.
- Margaret Christina Vera Parfitt, Chairman, Social Services Association of Metropolitan Authorities.
- Cecil Allen Parker, Deputy Chief Scientific Officer, Ministry of Defence.
- Arthur Pearson. For political and public service in Northern England.
- Vera Joyce Mabel Poole, Assistant Secretary, Department of Health & Social Security.
- Derek Hair Pringle, President, Edinburgh Chamber of Commerce & Manufactures.
- Arthur Shelley Prophet, Professor of Dental Surgery, University of London.
- Eirlys Margaret Rees, President, Royal College of Nursing.
- Alexander Allan Rennie, QPM, Chief Constable, West Mercia Constabulary.
- Frederick William Rimmer, Gardiner Professor of Music, University of Glasgow.
- Joseph Hunter Saphir, Chairman, Saphir Sons & Co. Ltd.
- Professor Leonard Bertram Schapiro. For services to Russian Studies.
- Geoffrey John David Seaton. For political and public service in Greater London.
- Reginald Arthur Shooter, Professor of Medical Microbiology, University of London.
- Henry George Simpson, OBE, Controller of Housing, Greater London Council.
- Albert Edward Sloman, Vice-Chancellor, University of Essex.
- Norman Brian Smith, Director, Imperial Chemical Industries Ltd.
- Robert Courtney Smith. Chairman, Scottish United Investors Ltd.
- Rosemary Morland Smitherman. For political and public service in South Eastern England.
- Kenneth Walter Lawrence Steele, OBE KPM, lately Chief Constable, Avon & Somerset Constabulary.
- John Edgar Stevens, Professor of Medieval and Renaissance English, Cambridge University. For services to musicology.
- Maurice Johnson Stoakes, Vice-Chairman, British Poultry Federation.
- Michael Francis Strachan, MBE, Chairman, Ben Line Steamers Ltd. and Ben Line Containers Ltd.
- Arthur Suddaby, Provost, City of London Polytechnic.
- Peter Arthur Storey Taylor, lately Chief of Administration, Bank of England.
- Emyr Thomas, DL, General Manager, Telford New Town Development Corporation.
- Norman Thomas, HM Chief Inspector of Schools, Department of Education & Science.
- John Brian Thompson, Director of Radio, Independent Broadcasting Authority.
- John Evans Tudor. For public service in Wales.
- Peter Frank George Twinn, Second Secretary, Natural Environment Research Council.
- Ronald Unger, Personnel Director, British Airports Authority.
- Thomas Edwin Utley, Leader Writer, The Daily Telegraph.
- Derek Daniel Vonberg, Director, Cyclotron Unit, Medical Research Council.
- Charles Fred Ward, lately Chairman, Dobson Park Industries Ltd. For services to export.
- Edgar George Whttbread, Deputy Chief Inspector of Factories, Health & Safety Executive, Department of Employment.
- Mary Whitehouse, General Secretary, National Viewers & Listeners Association.
- Cyril George Wickham, Chairman, Standing Advisory Committee on Patents.
- Leslie Clarence Young, Chairman, J. Bibby & Sons Ltd.
- Thomas Newton Hayward Young, MBE. For political and public service in Scotland.

Diplomatic Service & Overseas List

- Malcolm James Alexander, Director of Marine, Hong Kong.
- Michael George Bloomer. For services to British commercial interests in Nigeria
- Paul Brauner. For services to British commercial interests in Dubai.
- Professor Alexander John Carmichael. For services to British commercial interests in Australia.
- Taufik Suliman Cotran, Chief Justice of Lesotho.
- Owen Glyn Griffith, OBE MVO, British High Commissioner, Maseru.
- Peter James Gunter, OBE. For services to British commercial interests in the British community in Kuwait.
- James Lawson Kergan. For services to British commercial interests and the British community in Kuwait.
- Professor Uwe Kitzinger. For services to British academic interests in France.
- Norman Dunvegan Macleod. For services to British commercial interests in Japan.
- Edward Hewitt Nichols, OBE. Director of Agriculture and Fisheries, Hong Kong.
- Wilfred Francis Pickering, Justice of Appeal, Hong Kong.
- Dr. Edward Stanley Davis Ratteray. For public services in Bermuda.
- Dr. Stanley Arthur Ridgwell. For services to British commercial interests in Malaysia.
- John Martin Rowlands, Secretary For the Civil Service, Hong Kong.
- Abraham William Serfaty, OBE JP. For public services in Gibraltar.
- Norman Sinclair Thompson, Chairman, Mass Transit Railway Corporation, Hong Kong.
- Michael Jackson Ward, British Council representative, Italy.
- Dr. Edward Hammond Williams, MBE. For medical and welfare services to the community in Uganda.

Australian States

State of Victoria

- Hector William Crawford, OBE, of Canterbury. For service to the arts.

State of Queensland

- Winifred Alice Freeman, MBE, of Galloways Hill. For community services.
- Thomas McCormack, MBE, of Clayfield. For service to the community and to the people of Queensland.

State of Western Australia

- Neil Campbell Hawkins, of North Beach. For public and community service.

==== Officer of the Order of the British Empire (OBE) ====
Military Division

Royal Navy

- Commander William Forster Charter.
- Lieutenant Colonel Henry James Flamank, Royal Marines.
- Commander Michael David Goodwin.
- Commander John Sydney Guard.
- Commander Peter Swan Leggott.
- Commander Colin McKenzie Marr.
- Commander John Christopher Mather.
- Commander John Alexander Rogers.
- Commander Edward William De Warenne Waller.
- Commander William Nicholas Lavington Woodley.

Army

- Lieutenant Colonel Norman Charles Allen (454098), Corps of Royal Military Police.
- Acting Colonel Michael Frederick Robert Bullock, DL, (343600), Army Cadet Force, Territorial Army, Colonel, the Devonshire and Dorset Regiment.
- Lieutenant Colonel Ronald John Burnett (410834), Royal Regiment of Artillery.
- Lieutenant Colonel Hugh Ernest Powell Colley, MBE, (454999), Royal Regiment of Artillery.
- Lieutenant Colonel (now Acting Colonel) Simon Edward Graham Fraser (448959), Corps of Royal Engineers.
- Lieutenant Colonel Garrett Taylor Lionel Maurice Graham (376368), the Duke of Edinburgh's Royal Regiment (Berkshire and Wiltshire) (now Regular Army Reserve of Officers (RARO)).
- Major (local Lieutenant Colonel) Colin Michael Sutton Kaye (473985), The Light Infantry.
- Lieutenant Colonel David Llewellyn Lewis (457205), Royal Tank Regiment.
- Lieutenant Colonel Ian Paterson, TD, (467975), the King's Regiment, Territorial Army.
- Lieutenant Colonel Leon Claude Joseph Medlock Paul (413597), the Royal Anglian Regiment.
- Major (local Lieutenant Colonel) Gavin Horsburgh Peebles (471325), the Gordon Highlanders.
- Acting Lieutenant Colonel Cecil Richardson (289609), Combined Cadet Force, Territorial Army.
- Lieutenant Colonel William Edward Rous, MBE, (461492), Coldstream Guards.
- Lieutenant Colonel (Staff Quartermaster) William James Scoging, MBE, (472784), Royal Army Ordnance Corps.
- Lieutenant Colonel Francis Anthony Hereward Swallow (451582), the Royal Anglian Regiment.
- Lieutenant Colonel Neil Gordon Thorne, TD MP, (450856), Royal Regiment of Artillery, Territorial Army.
- Lieutenant Colonel George Charles Verdon (451338), Royal Corps of Signals.
- Lieutenant Colonel David Wordley Williams (440193), Corps of Royal Engineers.

Overseas Award

- Lieutenant Colonel Brendan O'Donnell Hollis, ED, Bermuda Regiment.

Royal Air Force

- Wing Commander Maurice Arnold (2617855).
- Wing Commander William Arthur Creasey (5201843).
- Wing Commander Keith Owen Harding (4220028).
- Wing Commander Barry Dalziel Jones (506590).
- Wing Commander Graham Franklin Lawrence (609200).
- Wing Commander Terence John Nash, AFC, (4230199).
- Wing Commander George Richard Profit, AFC, (4231082).
- Wing Commander Paul Leo Quin (505210).
- Wing Commander Kenneth John Ryan (1890373).
- Wing Commander (now Group Captain) Michael George Pierre Venn (505202).
- Wing Commander Martyn Wootton Ward (5200731).

Overseas Award

- Wing Commander Ross Grange Penlington, Royal Hong Kong Auxiliary Air Force.

Civil Division

- James Burnside Addison, lately Works Manager, Drungans Works, Plastics Division, Dumfries, Imperial Chemical Industries Ltd.
- Syed Mohsin Mohammed Ali, Diplomatic Editor, Reuters Ltd.
- Hubert Allen, Chairman and General Manager, Yelloway Motor Services Ltd.
- Albert Alfred James Anderson. For political and public service in the South East.
- George Thomas Arnold, Divisional Organiser, Amalgamated Union of Engineering Workers, Northumberland (Tyne and Blyth).
- Wallace Gerald Atkinson, Chairman and Chief Executive, London Bridge Engineering Ltd.
- Harry Allen Bailey, QPM, Assistant Chief Constable, Staffordshire Police.
- Charles George Edmond Banks, Chairman and Chief Executive, Thomas De La Rue & Co. Ltd. For services to export.
- Mark Barber. For services to Boys' Clubs in South Yorkshire.
- Peter John Barlow, Foreign and Commonwealth Office.
- Zita Honora Barnett. For services to midwifery.
- Rex Bate, Director, Renold Ltd.
- George Meyrick Beddoe, Director, The Halifax Courier Ltd.
- Philip Thomas Battye Bendall, lately Chief Special Services Officer, Bradford Local Education Authority.
- Roland Edward Benner, Chairman, Frank E. Benner Ltd., Belfast.
- Raymond John Bernie, Chief Executive and Town Clerk, Borough of Ellesmere Port and Neston Council.
- Allan Farquharson Blacklaws, Director of Personnel, Scottish and Newcastle Breweries Ltd.
- Thomas James Booth, Manager, Personnel Department, Navy, Army and Air Force Institutes.
- Ruth Elizabeth Mary Bowden, Professor of Anatomy, Royal Free Hospital School of Medicine.
- Geoffrey Boycott. For services to Cricket.
- Thomas Martin Brannan, Chairman, Fire and Emergency Planning Committee, Association of County Councils.
- Thomas Edward Brassington, Headmaster, Ralph Gardner High School, North Shields.
- Thomas Anthony Breakell, President, Electrical, Electronic, Telecommunications and Plumbing Union.
- Wilfred Kayran Brennan, Assistant Education Officer, Inner London Education Authority.
- William Percival Broomfield, Chairman, Aberdeen Airport Consultative Committee.
- Robert Edward Brum. For political and public service in Greater London.
- Wilfred Jasper Burnett, DSO DFC AFC, Secretary, Unit Trust Association.
- Edwin Bushby, Farmer, Cumbria.
- John Cameron, Senior Lecturer, Institute of Education, University of London.
- George Carlton, lately Director of Administration, Strathclyde Regional Council.
- Paul Evan Carter, lately Manager, Central Planning Group, British Nuclear Fuels Ltd.
- Roger Leslie Carter, Works Director, Bristol, J. S. Fry & Sons.
- Nigel Chancellor, Managing Director, May & Baker Ltd.
- Charles Vernon Chappell. For political service in the West Midlands.
- Brigadier George James Stewart Chatterton, DSO, Chairman, Lady Hoare Trust.
- Albert Woods Chisholm, Principal, Clydebank Technical College.
- Terence George Clark, Chairman and Managing Director, Engineering Laboratory Equipment Ltd. For services to export.
- Robert Climie. For services to Orienteering.
- Alan Wallace Coates, Principal, Board of Inland Revenue.
- Sydney Morris Cockerell, Bookbinder.
- Joseph Edward Colehan, District Alkali Inspector, Health & Safety Executive, Department of Employment.
- Raymond Crosby Cook. For services to the Royal British Legion in the South East.
- Valerie Elizabeth Cook, Headmistress, La Retraite High School, Bristol.
- Margaret Jean Drummond Cooper, Chief Education Officer, General Nursing Council for England and Wales.
- William Trevor Cosby, Deputy Chairman, A.A.F. Ltd.
- Helen Margaret Crompton, Chief Area Nursing Officer, Grampian Health Board.
- Roland Joseph Culver, Actor.
- Robert Henry Dagworthy, Deputy Editor, Official Report, House of Commons.
- Margaret Dalloway. For services to home economics education.
- William Frank Dancey, Chief Fire Officer, West Glamorgan Fire Brigade.
- Eric Sidney Harold Davies, General Manager, Cardiff Telephone Area, Wales and the Marches Telecommunications Board, Post Office.
- John Arthur Davison, County Surveyor and Bridgemaster, Cumbria County Council.
- Daphne Joan Denver, Director, West Yorkshire Branch, British Red Cross Society.
- Stanley George Albert Dow, Principal, Department of the Environment.
- Peter Robert Lionel Drew, Director, Taylor Woodrow Ltd.
- Captain Guilford Dudley, Harbourmaster, Milford Haven.
- Geoffrey Harry George Dyson, lately President, British Association of National Coaches.
- Catherine Elizabeth Easton. For political and public service in Western England.
- Bernard Albert Eastwell, Managing Director, V. G. Instruments Ltd. For services to export.
- Betty Ewen Eastwood. For political and public service in West Yorkshire.
- William Edgar, District Community Physician, West Berkshire.
- Percy Edwards, Divisional Director and General Manager, Hatfield-Chester Division, Aircraft Group, British Aerospace.
- Ivor Evans, Deputy Director, Mining Research and Development Establishment, National Coal Board.
- Captain Philip Herbert Earle Welby-Everard, DSC DL. For public service in Lincolnshire.
- Charles Hugh Branston Faulkner, Director, Help the Aged.
- Samuel Fedida, lately Technical Director, Aregon International Ltd.
- Mary Elizabeth Floyd, DL, Chairman, Wiltshire Probation and After-Care Committee.
- Montague Patrick Ford, Veterinary Surgeon, North Uist.
- Harold Leslie Freakes, Secretary, the Historical Association.
- Jack Padbury Friswell. For political and public service in Wessex.
- Eric John Frogley, MBE ERD, Transport Adviser (U.K.), Transport and Distribution Advisory Department, Unilever Ltd.
- Henry Lavender Frost, Member, Maldon District Council.
- John Frost, Headmaster, Sullivan Upper School, Holywood, County Down.
- Trevor Ferber Joseph Galley, Director, Graesser Salicylates Ltd., Deeside, Clwyd.
- Maureen Frances Fraser-Gamble, Secretary, Association of Nurse Administrators.
- Margaret Gardiner (Margaret Emilia Gardiner Bernal). For services to the Pier Arts Centre Trust, Stromness.
- Bernard Henry Geddes. For services to the Children's Film Foundation Ltd.
- Herbert Leslie George, lately Headmaster, Christleton County High School, Chester.
- Charles Walker Burgess Gilbert, MC, Principal, Department of Energy.
- Peter Gill, Director, Riverside Studios.
- Robert Howard Gosling, Consultant Psychotherapist, Tavistock Clinic.
- Cedric Richard William Grantham, Chairman, East Midlands Electricity Consultative Council.
- Anthony George Molyneux Greenland. For political service.
- Philip James Grimmer. For services to local government in Gwent.
- Frank Eric Cyril Habgood, lately Superintending Engineer, Department of Transport.
- Bryan Denis Hall, Senior Sales Director, James Mackie & Sons Ltd.
- Joan Helen Hall. For services to the Girl Guides Association in Hampshire.
- Edward Vaughan Harper, Headmaster, Welshpool High School.
- Kenneth Cecil Harrison, MBE, lately Chief Librarian, Westminster City Council.
- Clifford Ronald Hatts, General Manager, Television Design Group, British Broadcasting Corporation.
- Ronald William Henry Harvey Hearn, MBE. For services to the Royal Society for the Prevention of Accidents.
- Bernard Oliver Heath, Divisional Technical Director, Warton Division, Aircraft Group, British Aerospace.
- David Helm, QPM, lately Deputy Assistant Commissioner, Metropolitan Police.
- Noel Peers Hepworth, Director, Chartered Institute of Public Finance and Accountancy.
- Josef Herman, Painter.
- Stanley Ernest Wood-Higgs, Director, Office Machines and Equipment Federation.
- Eric George Hills, lately Assistant Director, Postal Engineering Development Division, Post Office.
- Donald Lane Vere Hodge. For services as Election Commissioner, Rhodesia.
- John Hogg, Secretary, Local Government Staff Commission, Northern Ireland.
- John Anthony Charles Humphries, Chairman, Water Space Amenity Commission.
- Kenneth Llewellyn Hunt, Professor of Computing Science, Royal Military College of Science, Shrivenham.
- Eric Jameson, Chairman, E. Jameson Associates.
- Elly Whitehouse-Jansen, Director, the Richmond Fellowship.
- Metford Arthur Jeanes, Chairman, Somerset College of Agriculture and Horticulture.
- Herbert George Jenkins, lately Senior Principal, Department of Education and Science.
- David Tucker Johnston, Partner, Johnston & Wright, Carlisle.
- Frederick Henry Jones, Principal Scientific Officer, Ministry of Defence.
- Jane Wyndham-Kaye, General Secretary, Health Visitors' Association.
- William James Kerr, Governor Class I, Prison Service.
- Charles Llewellyn King, Clerk of the Lists, Royal Courts of Justice.
- Enid Lakeman. For political and public service.
- Ronald Smith Lancaster, QPM. For services as Assistant Police Adviser, Salisbury Province, Rhodesia.
- Peter Johnston Lane, Senior Principal, British Library.
- Alexander Eric Large, TD DL, lately Chairman, Visiting Committee, Noranside Borstal Institution, Angus.
- Charles Richard Leggott. For services to the community in Lincolnshire.
- John Logan Lewis, Senior Science Master, Malvern College.
- James Denis (John) Long, lately General Secretary, Newcastle upon Tyne Council for Voluntary Service.
- Jack Longden, Principal, Keighley Technical College.
- William Francis Grattan Lord. For services to the Royal National Life-Boat Institute, particularly in Scotland.
- Joseph Lowry, Consultant Clinical Pathologist, Southern Health and Social Services Board, Northern Ireland.
- Grenville Llewellyn Lucas, Senior Principal Scientific Officer, Ministry of Agriculture, Fisheries and Food.
- William McCrorie, Senior Principal Legal Executive, Metropolitan Police.
- Thomas Alexander McGowran, Managing Director, F. Johnston & Co. Ltd.
- Allan McLeod, DL. For public service in Dunbartonshire.
- Margaret Henderson McLeod, Deputy Chief Nursing Officer, Department of Health and Social Security.
- Duncan McInnes McNiven. For services to Glasgow Legal Aid Committee.
- Thomas Charles David Manby, Head, Machine Division, National Institute of Agricultural Engineering, Silsoe, Bedfordshire.
- Joseph Mercer. For services to horse racing.
- Edward Septimus Milburn, lately Marketing Director, North East Area, National Coal Board.
- John Miller, Member, Chemical Economic Development Committee.
- Ivan Montgomery, President, Road Safety Council of Northern Ireland.
- Muriel Elizabeth Morley. For services to speech therapy.
- Professor Robert Joseph North, lately Vice-Principal, University of Birmingham.
- Mary Elizabeth O'Fee, lately Mayor, North Down Borough Council.
- Brigadier John Briton Oldfield, Secretary, Eastern Wessex Territorial Auxiliary and Volunteer Reserve Association.
- Olwen Jones Padfield. For services to the magistracy in Wolverhampton.
- Jonathan Hector Carruthers Pape, General Manager, National Dock Labour Board.
- John Albert Parker, Foreign and Commonwealth Office.
- Ian Walter Forestall Paterson. For political and public service in Northern England.
- Ranald James Paterson. For Services as Election Supervisor, Buhera District, Rhodesia.
- Robert Lancelot Paterson, MC ERD, Director, Merseyside Chamber of Commerce and Industry.
- Douglas Medcalf Paulin, Member, Eastern Health and Social Services Board, Northern Ireland.
- Hedley Joyce Phillips, QPM, Deputy Chief Constable, Hampshire Constabulary.
- Reginald Thomas Pine, General Secretary, The Association of Optical Practitioners.
- Clive Sheridan Ponting, Principal, Ministry of Defence.
- Christopher George Prater. For services to art.
- Charles Frederick Proctor, lately Conductor, Alexandra Choir.
- Manuel Rabstein, lately Member, Diamond Committee, HM Customs and Excise.
- Bernard Butts Reiss, General Medical Practitioner, Cambridge.
- Harry Richardson, Chairman, Technical Sub-Committee, Home Grown Timber Advisory Committee.
- Anthony Roger Rickard, Clerk to the Justices, Colchester, Harwich and Tendring Petty Sessional Divisions.
- Frederick Craig Riddle, Viola Player.
- Gordon Ridley, Director of Planning and Transportation, Greater London Council.
- Walter John Beavan Robinson, lately Education Secretary, British Broadcasting Corporation.
- Anne Lucinda Romilly, Deputy Superintendent-in-Chief, St. John Ambulance Brigade.
- Reginald Fernand Harry Ross, TD, City Estates Officer, Birmingham City Council.
- John Rowsell, Farmer, Hampshire.
- John Arthur Halstead Douglas Savill, lately Member, Diamond Committee, HM Customs and Excise.
- Godfrey Saxon, Principal Scientific Officer, Daresbury Laboratory, Science Research Council.
- Irene Frances Say, Deputy Chairman, Board of Visitors, HM Prison Maidstone.
- Gerhart Martin Schaefer, Chairman, Lawtex Ltd., Manchester.
- Herbert August Edward Scheele. For services to Badminton.
- Gerald Walter Scott, Chairman and Managing Director, Abbeycraft Furniture Ltd. For services to export.
- Vera Stephanie Shirley, Chairman, F International Group.
- Iain Crichton Smith, Writer.
- Dennis Spooner, lately Headmaster, Beaver Hill Secondary School, Sheffield.
- Michael Fabian Spungin. For political and public service in the East Midlands.
- Prunella Stack (Ann Prunella Power). For services to the Women's League of Health and Beauty.
- Captain David Robert Grant Stephen, RD, Commanding Officer, Department of Agriculture and Fisheries for Scotland Fishery Protection Vessel Westra.
- Henry Frank Stephens, MBE ERD, Head of Fuel and Energy Department, Confederation of British Industry.
- Philip Ladlow Stride, lately Divisional Manager, Defence and Avionic Systems, MEL Equipment Co. Ltd. For services to export.
- Edward Robson Sumner, Director, Swift & Co. Ltd.
- Percy Tayler, VRD, Principal, Department of Health and Social Security.
- Margery Helen Taylor, Director of Social Services, London Borough of Redbridge.
- Paul Arthur Taylor, General Manager of Exploration Companies, British Gas Corporation.
- Alfred Tennick, Principal Industrial Relations Officer, Department of Employment.
- Eric Jones Thomas, Principal Professional Technology Officer, Ministry of Defence.
- Captain Michael Glegge Thomas, Master, Ocean Transport & Trading Ltd.
- Eric Francis Thurston, Chairman, Thurston Engineering Co. Ltd.
- Edward Robert Arthur Trengove. For public service in Cornwall.
- Alan Burnyeat Turnbull. For services to agriculture in Wales.
- Ronald James Turner. For political and public service in Western England.
- Patrick Hare Vivian Twist, Chairman, Trustee Savings Bank of Birmingham and the Midlands.
- Maurice Hobson Twydell. For political service in Eastern England.
- John Galloway Wallace, Chairman, Working Party on Health Priorities.
- Oliver Maxwell Watt, Consultant Anaesthetist IA, Administrative Charge, Monklands District General Hospital, Airdrie.
- Frank Whipp, lately Principal, Department of Trade.
- Raymond Maurice Whitfield, Senior Principal, Home Office.
- Alan Herbert Wickens, Director of Research, British Rail.
- Clifford Willetts, Member, Dudley Metropolitan Borough Council.
- John Christopher Williams, Guitarist.
- John Owen Williams. For political and public services.
- John Raymond Williams, Senior Inspector, Board of Customs and Excise.
- John Grant Williamson, Vice President, Rent Assessment Panel for Scotland.
- Charles Wilson, lately Headteacher, Auchenharvie Academy, Stevenston.
- David Winter, Partner, Baker & McKenzie. For services to export.
- Graham Woodcock. For political and public service in the North West.
- John Charles Woolley, District Administrator, North Devon Health District, Devon Area Health Authority.
- Leslie Victor Worsdell, DFC AE, Director, Airport and Flight Operations, Marshall of Cambridge (Engineering) Ltd.
- Elizabeth Beatrice Joan Worsfold. For political and public service in Wales.
- Bertram Alfred Young, Dramatic Critic, Financial Times.
- John Henderson Young, Councillor, City of Glasgow District Council.

Diplomatic Service and Overseas List

- Claude Alan Axworthy, First Secretary (Administration), British High Commission, Ottawa.
- Rex Lauriston Basedon. For services to the British community in Lille.
- Professor Robert William Bell. For services to university education in Swaziland.
- Clive Brasnett, British Council Representative, Lebanon.
- Winifred Calmels, MBE, lately First Secretary and Consul, HM Embassy, Rome.
- Monsignor Facundo Jose Castillo, Vicar-General of Belize.
- Dr. Hector William Catling. For services to British cultural interests in Greece.
- Ian Pender Chalmers, First Secretary, HM Embassy, Paris.
- Dr. Kenneth Kwok-Wing Chaun. For services to the community in Hong Kong.
- Professor Michael James Colbourne. For services to medical education in Hong Kong.
- Francis William Courtney, MC. For services to the British community in Bombay.
- The Reverend Frederick Ronald Dain. For educational and welfare services to the community in Kenya.
- Reece Discombe. For services to the community in the New Hebrides Condominium.
- Philip Guy Mansfield Dudeney. For services to British commercial interests and the British community in Nigeria.
- Gilbert Edward Macdonald Eastaugh. For services to the British community in Oporto.
- Irene Monica Harries Easton, MBE, lately First Secretary and Consul, HM Embassy, Paris.
- Charlesworth Walterfield Edwards, Permanent Secretary, Ministry of Economic Development, Antigua.
- Michael George Eltenton, British Council Representative, Portugal.
- Ian Robert George Ferguson. For services to British commercial interests in Düsseldorf.
- Denis Lees Hall. For services to the British community in Paris.
- Maurice Hall. For services to British commercial interests and to the community in Johannesburg.
- Leslie Frederick Walter Hayward. For services to British commercial interests and the British community in Dubai.
- George Ho. For services to the community in Hong Kong.
- Fred Howarth. For services to co-operatives development in Jordan.
- Michael Edward Howell, Charge D'Affaires, HM Embassy, Kabul.
- John Alexander Lawrence, Assistant Education Adviser, British Council, New Delhi.
- Frank Hui-Po Lin. For services to commerce in Hong Kong.
- Austin Hugh McNally. For services to British commercial interests and the British community in Osaka.
- Dr. Frederick Christopher Maddox. For medical and welfare services to the community in Thailand.
- Michael White Marshall, First Secretary (Commercial), HM Embassy, Caracas.
- Professor Alan Philip Mead. For services to university education in Nigeria
- Adrian Bertrand Monk, JP. For public services in the Falkland Islands.
- Justin Patrick Pearse Nason, First Secretary, British High Commission, Kampala.
- James Armour Nimmo. For services to the British community in Karachi.
- Edward Desmond O'Mahony, lately Charge D'Affaires, HM Embassy, San Salvador.
- Dr. Quamina William Osborne. For services to medicine and the community in the British Virgin Islands.
- The Venerable Thomas Rothwell Quin, Archdeacon of Switzerland.
- Colin Morven Sharman. For services to the British community in the Netherlands.
- Harry Thomas Edwin Smith. For services to agricultural development in Swaziland.
- David Rolland Spedding, First Secretary, HM Embassy, Abu Dhabi.
- Harry David Stead, Director of Engineering Development, Public Works Department, Hong Kong.
- William Frederick Stones. For services to British commercial interests in Hong Kong.
- Thomas Stubbs, lately First Secretary and Consul, HM Embassy, Addis Ababa.
- Margaret Albinia Joanna Swinley, lately British Council Representative, Israel.
- Dr. Joseph Taylor. For medical and welfare services to the community in Tanzania.
- Norman Wade. For services to British commercial interests and the British community in India.
- Howard Walters. For services to the British community in Karachi.
- Albert Paul Weaver, lately British Council Representative, Ghana.
- Donald James Williams. For services to education in Bermuda.
- James Fletcher Williams. For services to agricultural development in Yemen.

Australian States

State of Victoria

- Kelvin Coe, of Kensington. For services to the Australian ballet.
- Councillor Allan Albert Dunstan, of Donald. For municipal service.
- Thomas Leslie William Emerson, of Vermont. For services to special education.
- John Albert Hepworth, of Brighton. For services to accounting and the community.
- Jack Kennedy, of Burwood. For services to the physically handicapped.
- David Mandie, MBE, of Toorak. For community service.
- Marilyn Patricia Rowe Maver, of Camberwell. For services to the Australian ballet.
- Berek Robert Segan, of North Ivanhoe. For services to the arts.
- Lorna Verdun Sisely, of Toorak. For services to medicine.

State of Queensland

- Councillor John Leslie Beausang, of Caloundra. For services to local government.
- Kevin James Driscoll, of Bridgeman Downs. For services to the building industry.
- Leslie George Duthie, of Rockhampton. For services to the community and the tourist industry.
- Yvonne May Herbert, of Graceville. For services to charity and the community.
- Daniel Costigan McEnery, of Upper Mount Gravatt. For services to charity.
- The Reverend Eric Roy Moore, of Eastern Heights. For services to the community.

State of South Australia

- Mavis Dawn Cooper, of Jamestown. For services to the community and Country Women's Association.
- Rex Clement Warnes, of Burra. For services to the Royal Agricultural and Horticultural Society.

State of Western Australia

- William Thomas Peart, of Floreat Park. For services to trade and industry.
- George Alexander Shea, of Dalkeith. For services to public transport.

==== Member of the Order of the British Empire (MBE) ====
Military Division

Royal Navy

- Lieutenant Commander Norman William Bell.
- Fleet Chief Radio Supervisor David John Caless, J898263J.
- Lieutenant Commander Philip Eric Cressey.
- Lieutenant Commander John Joseph Henry Harrison.
- Lieutenant Commander John Barry Armstrong Hawkins.
- Lieutenant Commander Raymond Hicks.
- Lieutenant Commander Duncan Fitzroy William Honey. (Died 15 May 1980).
- Lieutenant Commander Peter Philip Moody.
- Lieutenant Commander Brian Newton.
- Lieutenant Commander Percy Maurice Pancott.
- Fleet Chief Petty Officer (Operations) (Radar) Patrick Roger Peaty, J908518U.
- Lieutenant (CS) William Ellis Pugh.
- Fleet Chief Cook Norman Jackson Richardson, M122290R.
- Lieutenant (CS) William Douglas Rogers.
- Lieutenant Commander Kenneth Schofield.
- Temporary Lieutenant Commander (SCC) Maurice Searle, Royal Naval Reserve.
- Temporary Lieutenant Commander (SCC) Michael Arnold Hamlyn Smith, Royal Naval Reserve.

Army

- 24018078 Warrant Officer Class 2 Graham John Arscott, Royal Army Ordnance Corps.
- Captain Jonathan Bernard Appleton Bailey (494267), Royal Regiment of Artillery.
- Major Gerald Bertram Blight (418202), The Devonshire and Dorset Regiment (now RARO).
- 23467061 Warrant Officer Class 1 Anthony Douglas Braid, Royal Army Medical Corps.
- Major Desmond Julian Walker Browne (479967), The Royal Anglian Regiment.
- Captain (Quartermaster) John Wilson Browne (495897), the King's Regiment.
- Major (Quartermaster) Joshua Guy Brynolf (491083), The Light Infantry.
- Major Richard Lindsay Cariss, TD, (468348), The Royal Regiment of Fusiliers, Territorial Army.
- Major John Gavin Easson (431 059 575), 8th Canadian Hussars (Princess Louise's).
- Major James Gideon Finlay (481771), The Royal Scots (The Royal Regiment).
- 23850237 Warrant Officer Class 1 David Edmund Fitch, Army Catering Corps.
- Major (Quartermaster) Thomas Raymond Major Forrest (485989), Coldstream Guards.
- 23982655 Warrant Officer Class 1 Barry William George, Corps of Royal Electrical and Mechanical Engineers.
- Captain John Goodsir (484857), Army Air Corps.
- Captain Robert Greenhowe (500768), The Gordon Highlanders.
- 23664946 Warrant Officer Class 2 Evan David Harris, The Royal Regiment of Wales (24th/41st Foot).
- 23675763 Warrant Officer Class 1 Terence Michael Anthony Hart, Royal Regiment of Artillery.
- Captain Richard Michael Robert Hodson (496310), the Light Infantry.
- Captain David Malcolm Howell (500438), Army Legal Corps.
- 23735817 Warrant Officer Class 1 Edward Glyn Hughes, the Royal Welch Fusiliers.
- Major William James Marshall, TD, (468108), Royal Corps of Transport, Territorial Army.
- Captain (Ammunition Executive Officer) James Anthony McGrellis (499653), Royal Army Ordnance Corps.
- Major (Quartermaster) Alan Ross McKinnell (487373), the Black Watch (Royal Highland Regiment).
- Major David Patrick de Courcy Morgan (461477), 7th Duke of Edinburgh's Own Gurkha Rifles.
- Major Richard Morgan (472585), Royal Corps of Transport.
- Major (now Lieutenant Colonel) Alan Hackford Protheroe (443865), the Royal Regiment of Wales (24th/41st Foot), Territorial Army.
- Captain (Acting Major) Timothy Corran Richard Brooke Purdon (487568), Irish Guards.
- Major (now Lieutenant Colonel) William John Pherrick Robins (469087), Royal Corps of Signals.
- Major (now Lieutenant Colonel) Nigel George Douglass Robinson (460540), the Royal Regiment of Fusiliers.
- Lieutenant William Rudd (510571), Corps of Royal Engineers.
- Lieutenant (Quartermaster) Peter Robert Scott (509652), the Honourable Artillery Company, Territorial Army.
- Major Philip Shaw (467630), Royal Army Pay Corps.
- 22767184 Warrant Officer Class 2 George Andrew Short, the Parachute Regiment, Territorial Army.
- Major Graham Frederick William Smith (479351), Royal Regiment of Artillery.
- 23864012 Warrant Officer Class 2 Ian George Storey, Corps of Royal Military Police.
- Major Terence Thomas Taylor (465431), The Royal Anglian Regiment.
- Major (Local Lieutenant Colonel) Ivor Gwyn Thomas (385267), Royal Army Ordnance Corps.
- Captain (Acting Major) Robert Eric Veck (492154), Corps of Royal Engineers.
- Major William Robert Metcalfe Watson (475256), the Royal Regiment of Wales (24th/41st Foot).
- Acting Major Owen Emlyn Williams, MM, (459726), Army Cadet Force, Territorial Army.
- Captain (Adviser Infantry Weapons) Alexander Wilson (501190), Small Arms School Corps.

Royal Air Force

- Squadron Leader John Denys Armstrong (2617026).
- Squadron Leader Ian Murray Calder (2528393).
- Squadron Leader Patrick Vincent Coffey (579904).
- Squadron Leader Michael Patrick Shawe (2295822), RAF Regiment (Ret'd).
- Squadron Leader Andrew Robert Thompson (507889).
- Squadron Leader Robert Charles Tompkins (607536).
- Squadron Leader William Berrett Underwood (592416).
- Squadron Leader James Theodore Walton (584516).
- Squadron Leader Richard Nigel Woollacott (608334).
- Flight Lieutenant Grahame Jones (8020897).
- Flight Lieutenant Andrew Ronald John Prior (5203054).
- Acting Flight Lieutenant Joseph Leeper Armstrong (1091243), Royal Air Force Volunteer Reserve (Training Branch).
- Warrant Officer Malcolm Campbell (U4123191), RAF Regiment.
- Warrant Officer Donald Dykes (M4031017).
- Warrant Officer Derrick Thomas Fowler (C3045858).
- Warrant Officer Trevor Charles Hardcastle, BEM, (B3517121).
- Warrant Officer George Ireland, BEM, (N4036966), RAF Regiment.
- Warrant Officer William Arthur Law (E2352645).
- Warrant Officer Roy Millington (U3503019).
- Warrant Officer Donald Pagel (Q4166810).
- Warrant Officer Alistair John William Robins, BEM, (M0592310).
- Warrant Officer Francis Graham Smith (B1923889).
- Warrant Officer Denis Telford (Y4090189).

Civil Division

- William Addison. For political and public service in Scotland.
- John Frederick Alfred Alexander, Tax Officer Higher Grade, Board of Inland Revenue.
- Professor Edward Allen, Member, Durham District Manpower Committee.
- Leslie Newman Anderton, Executive, Industrial Relations and Personnel, Talbot Motors Ltd.
- Dennis Matthew Arrandale, Assistant Director, Manchester Chamber of Commerce & Industry. For services to export.
- Elizabeth Margaret Atkin, Personal Secretary, Edinburgh Airport, British Airports Authority.
- John Alexander Baillie, lately Farm Manager, Durness, Sutherland.
- John Ball, lately Secretary, Overseas Department, Church Army.
- Xeslie Gordon Banbury, Assistant Director, Training, West Midlands Branch, British Red Cross Society.
- James Keir Stuart Bannatyne, General Manager, Gleneagles Hotel, Perthshire, British Transport Hotels Ltd.
- Alexander McKenzie Bannerman, lately Senior Scientific Officer, Ministry of Agriculture, Fisheries & Food.
- Leonard Alfred Barnes, Manager, Printing Department, Williams & Glyns Bank Ltd.
- Ian Vaughan Barrett, Master Baker, Director and Secretary, Barrett the Baker Ltd.
- Albert Edward Bates, Higher Executive Officer, Department For National Savings.
- Thomas Bell, Chairman, Gateshead and South Tyneside War Pensions Committee.
- Hobert William Best, Clerk of Works, Highways & Transportation Department, North Yorkshire County Council.
- Una Frances Black, Higher Executive Officer, Science Research Council.
- Myrtle Blackmore, Higher Executive Officer, Department of Employment.
- Jens Erik Bojen, Skipper/Owner Fisherman, Grimsby.
- Francis Baillie Boyd, Executive Officer, Electricity Service.
- Mary Hannah Boyle, lately Higher Executive Officer, Department of Health & Social Security.
- Maurice Anthony Bracken, lately Superintendent, Metropolitan Police.
- Caroline Frances Bradley. For services to show jumping.
- Harry Brashaw, Librarian, Advocates' Library, Edinburgh.
- Donald Charles Bray. For political and public service in Western England.
- Arthur Frank Brazier. For political and public service in Greater London.
- Rosemary Olive Joan Brinham, lately Ward Sister, Elizabeth Garrett Anderson Hospital, Camden and Islington Area Health Authority.
- Annie Elisabeth (Nancy) Brocklesby. For political service in South Yorkshire.
- Charles William Brown, Chaplain's Assistant, HM Prison Northallerton.
- George Andrew Brown, Technical Manager Neptune Glenfield Ltd.
- Geoffrey James Foster Burgess, TD, Commandant, West Yorkshire Special Constabulary.
- William Burns, Chief Improvement Officer, Norwich City Council.
- Lieutenant Commander Raymond William Edgar Burstow, President, Penzance Unit, Sea Cadet Corps.
- Philip John Byrne, Higher Executive Officer, Board of Customs & Excise.
- Maud Carr, lately Health Visitor, Staffordshire Area Health Authority.
- Captain Thomas Hughes Catesby, Chief Superintendent, Trinity House Service.
- Ruhita Ashoka Chand, Chairman, Wolverhampton Centre, National Trust.
- Mary Channon, Chief Superintendent of Typists, Board of Inland Revenue.
- Harold Chatfield, Area Staff Manager and Secretary, South Wales Area, National Coal Board.
- Robert Chisholm, Headteacher, Bowhouse Primary School, Grangemouth.
- Reginald John William Coite, Inspector of Taxes, Board of Inland Revenue.
- Sondra Pauline Cole, Passenger Service Officer, British Airways.
- Ernest James Coombes, Manager, Safety and Security, Barry Factory, BP Chemicals.
- Rose Eileen Bennett Coombs, Higher Executive Officer, Imperial War Museum.
- Peggy Kathleen Coulthard, lately Head Mistress, Collegiate Girls Grammar School, Leicester.
- Robin John Cousins. For services to ice skating.
- Captain John Burnaby Coutts, lately Secretary, Aberdeen Angus Cattle Society.
- Roy Marshall Cowley, lately Assistant Director of Social Services, Birmingham City Council.
- Derek Cox, Inspector, Hertfordshire Constabulary.
- Jean Cox, Deputy Chief Clerk, Manchester Crown Court.
- Thomas James Crosbie. For services to music in the Isle of Man.
- Ronald Percival Cross, lately Senior Occupational Therapist I, Ministry of Defence.
- William Eric Cruikshank, Executive Officer, Department of Health & Social Security.
- Robert McLure Dalgleish, General Secretary, Scottish Cross Country Union.
- Colonel Hugh Llewelyn Daniel, TD DL, Chief Surveyor, Greater London Territorial, Auxiliary & Volunteer Reserve Association.
- John Francis Bradshaw Darwin, lately Professional and Technology Officer I, Department of the Environment.
- Colin James Davies, Managing Director, Doncasters Blaenavon Ltd.
- Gwilym Daniel James Davies, Assistant County Engineer, Merseyside County Council.
- Thomas Harold Davies, Professional and Technology Officer I, Risley, United Kingdom Atomic Energy Authority.
- Edward James Oliver Day, Estate Manager, Snaith Estate Land Settlement Association.
- Ronald Delamere, Gallery Assistant, the Lady Lever Art Gallery, Port Sunlight.
- Harold Denningberg. For services to the community in Godalming.
- Edward Alan Denver, Director, W.E.X. (Consumer Goods) Ltd. For services to export.
- William Henry Richard Derbyshire, Welding Manager, Caird & Rayner Ltd.
- Arthur Roland Dexter, Director, Eastern British Road Services Ltd.
- Eric James Dixon, Personnel Director, Izal Ltd.
- Charlotte McLaren Dowdles, Head Instructor, Newhills School, Glasgow.
- William James Dowds, Area Manager, Ulster Bus Ltd.
- William John Drennan, General Secretary, Irish Football Association.
- Joyce Doreen Dudley, lately Physiotherapist, Clwyd Health Authority.
- William Affleck Easson, Member, Invergordon Community Council.
- Edna May Eedy, lately Executive Officer/Personal Secretary, Civil Service National Whitley Council (Staff Side).
- Jack Elliot. For services to the community in Comrie.
- William Elliott, Professional and Technology Officer I, Ministry of Defence.
- Margaret Evans, Deputy Head, Cowes High School, Isle of Wight.
- Hubert Harold Eves, lately Sales Director, E. Laxon & Co. Ltd.
- Joseph Thomas Fagg. For services to the community in Ashford, Kent.
- Alfred Raymond Finch, Director, Winchcombe Pottery Ltd., Cheltenham.
- William Harvey Fletcher, Assistant Manager, European Advertising Product Promotion, Cincinnati Milacron Ltd. For services to export.
- Jane Neilson Forsyth, Depute Rector, Sanquhar Academy.
- Charles Edwin Foxon. For services to the community in Thorpe Satchville, Leicestershire.
- John Edward Furness, VRD, Secretary, The Institute of Hospital Engineering.
- Edward Richard David Galione, Special Director and Engineering Manager, T. V. Vinten Group Ltd.
- Jane Graham Gallagher, Superintendent, Royal Ulster Constabulary.
- Mary (Marie) Doreen Gardiner, Senior Mistress, Mary Hare Grammar School for the Deaf, Newbury, Berkshire.
- Irene Caroline Garwood, Clerical Officer, Department of Health & Social Security.
- Jack Gershman, lately Chief Officer, Mersey Side, Union of Shop, Distributive and Allied Workers.
- Joseph Gill, Director (Industrial), British Textile Employers' Association.
- Norman Noah Goldwater, Consultant to C. Q. C. Ltd. For services to export.
- Charles Edward Gordon, President, Liverpool South Branch, Royal Air Forces Association.
- David Graham, Secretary, Greenock Chamber Music Club.
- Stuart Henry Grandin, lately Deputy Director General, Headquarters Purchasing & Stores Department, National Coal Board.
- Ronald William Greig, Supervising Examiner (Driving Test), Department of Transport.
- Mona Griffin, General Medical Practitioner, Aberdeen.
- Maurice Jones Griffiths. For services to agriculture in Wales.
- Hazel Edith Grimwood, Senior Executive Officer, Department of Industry.
- Walter Leonard Edwin Grove, Chief Clerk of Works, Redditch Development Corporation.
- Ronald Ernest Groves, DL, Member, Cherwell District Council.
- Jeffrey Brian Guyton, Assistant Chief Officer, Hertfordshire Fire Brigade.
- Mary Elizabeth Halliday. For services to the community, in Llandovery, Dyfed.
- Grace Emily Hammond, Principal Nursing Officer, Central Middlesex Industrial Health Service, Brent and Harrow Area Health Authority.
- Wilfred Charles Hammond. For political and public service in the South East.
- John Vincent Harries, Secretary, Carmarthen Pest Control Society Ltd.
- Esmond Julian Leslie Harris, Secretary, Community Council for Wiltshire.
- Joseph Harris, Telecommunications Technical Officer A, Metropolitan Police.
- Kenneth Ernest Harris. For political service.
- William Alfred Harris, Chief Police Officer, Dover Harbour Board Police.
- Alan Herbert Harrison, Senior Executive Officer, Overseas Development Administration.
- Cuthbert Temple Lane Harrison, TD, Chairman, Harrison & Harrison, Organ Builders.
- Vera Horrocks Harvey. For political service.
- William Flett Hay, Chairman, Scottish White Fish Producers' Association Ltd.
- Michael Hegarty, Divisional Nursing Officer, Gogarburn Hospital, Edinburgh.
- Margaret Allan Selma Henderson, Senior Scientific Officer, Ministry of Defence.
- Howard Michael Henry, Chairman, Taunton and District Disablement Advisory Committee.
- Norman George Hepburn, lately Member, North Turton Parish Council.
- Margaret Ann Hill, Staff Officer, Department of Manpower Services, Northern Ireland.
- Iris Joyce Hilliard, Assistant Registrar, General Dental Council.
- George Francis Patrick Hogan, Executive Officer, Department of Health & Social Security.
- Henry William Hole, Commodore, Venturers Norfolk Broads Cruise.
- Colin Weston Holyoake, Organist, St. Mary Magdalene Church, Knighton, Leicester.
- Jennifer Mary Hopkins, Head of History Department, Abbey Wood School, London.
- Richard Edward Houlton, Director, Geo. Houlton & Sons Ltd., Hull.
- Harry Frederick Howse, Commandant, Metropolitan Special Constabulary.
- Kenneth Howson, lately Senior Executive Officer, Department of Health & Social Security.
- Brenda Thirkell Huggett, Senior Executive Officer, Board of Customs & Excise.
- Geoffrey Aitken Hunt, lately Photographer, Ealing Gazette.
- William Hunt, Senior Collector of Taxes, Board of Inland Revenue.
- Olive Emmeline Hunter, Head, Performing & Visual Arts Department, Ilkley College.
- Courtney John Lyndhurst Jones, Chairman of the Council, National Skating Association of Great Britain. For services to ice skating.
- Olaf Jones, Area Controller, Dee & Clwyd Water Division, Welsh Water Authority.
- Walter Eaton Jones. For services to the community in Salford.
- Winifred Lilian Jordan, Organiser/Secretary, East Belfast Community Council.
- Ronald Victor Cecil Joyner, Principal Planner (Reclamation), West Midlands Metropolitan County Council.
- Kevin Damien Keelan. For services to Norwich City Football Club.
- Ferguson Kennedy, Sector Building Officer, Lennox Castle Hospital.
- Pamela Mary Adelaide Kennedy, lately Senior Personal Secretary, Ministry of Defence.
- Basil Kerbotson, Unit Administrator, St. Michael's & North Walsham Hospitals, Norfolk Area Health Authority.
- Dennis Kershaw, Chief Export Sales Manager, GEC High Voltage Switchgear Ltd. For services to export.
- Dorothy Maud King, Senior Nursing Officer, John Radcliffe Hospital, Oxford Area Health Authority.
- William Alfred King, Member, North Eastern Gas Consumers' Council.
- George Kirkham, Area Commissioner, Surrey, St. John Ambulance Brigade.
- Charles Kirkpatrick, County Secretary, Fermanagh, Ulster Savings Committee.
- George Knox, Director of Administration, Ettrick & Lauderdale District Council.
- John Knox, Divisional Commander, Fire Authority For Northern Ireland.
- Robert Lamont, Farmer, Argyll.
- Clive Hugh Alexander Landa. For political service in Greater London.
- Joan Ramsay La Very, Senior Executive Officer, Department of Health & Social Security.
- James Lawrie, DSC. For services to the construction industry.
- Samuel Lees, Senior Executive Officer, Department of Health & Social Security.
- Robert George Lindop, Deputy Clerk, Housing and Works Committee, London Boroughs Association.
- Wilfred Little, Senior Executive Officer, Ministry of Defence.
- Robina Forrest McCallum, Clerical Officer, Scottish Office.
- Patrick Mary McCullagh, Chief Superintendent, Royal Ulster Constabulary.
- George John McDermott, Cargo Operations Manager, Sheerness Docks, Medway Ports Authority.
- Gordon McDowall, Clerical Officer, Department of Education & Science.
- Olive McDowell. For service to the Northern Ireland Leukaemia Research Fund.
- Rhoda Jessie Alexandra McGuinness, lately Deputy Headmistress, Friary Grange School, Lichfield.
- Arthur Robertson McKay, Deputy Terminal Manager, Flotta Oil Terminal, Orkney, Occidental of Britain Inc.
- Derek James Mackay, Secretary, Independent Adoption Society.
- Terry Charles Grant McKay, lately Chief Dental Technician, Aberdeen Royal Infirmary.
- Thomas McLaughlan, Governor Class III, HM Prison Edinburgh.
- William McLaughlin, Secretary, Institution of Engineers & Shipbuilders in Scotland.
- Maureen McLoughlin, BEM, Divisional Officer Grade I, Greater Manchester Fire Brigade.
- Cynthia Kathleen McMillan. For service to the Glasgow Branch of The Samaritans.
- Frances Margaret McMorris, Secretary, Royal Society of Ulster Architects.
- Mary Francis Pauline MacNally, Chairman of Visiting Committee, Hydebank Wood Young Offenders Centre.
- John Leonard Malyan, Senior Partner, Broadway Malyan.
- Lily Roma Marriott, Member, East Midland Rent Assessment Panel.
- Frank Martin, Area Civil Engineer, Stratford, Eastern Region, British Rail.
- Stanley Victor Martin, Personnel. Manager, Northern Ireland Carriers Ltd.
- Hubert Trevor Dalrymple Marwood. For political and public service in Eastern England.
- Greta Joyce Mayhew, Assistant Secretary, Ipswich Chamber of Commerce & Shipping. For services to export.
- Joan Metcalfe, lately Personal Assistant, Wool, Jute & Flax Industry Training Board.
- Sheila Macbeth Mitchell. For services to genealogy.
- James William Rendall Moar. For political and public service in Scotland.
- Jackson Moore, General Secretary, United Road Transport Union.
- John Moore, Education Stores Officer, Gloucestershire Local Education Authority.
- William Thomas Moore, Chief Scientist, Rank Research Laboratories.
- David George Morgan, Staff Officer, Board of Inland Revenue.
- Doris Mary Morgan. For services to the community in Aberystwyth.
- Thomas Edward Morgan, Managing Director, Brown Lenox & Co Ltd., Pontypridd.
- Kathleen Shires Mosey. For services to the Citizens Advice Bureau, Shirley, Solihull.
- Alfred William Mudge, Headmaster, St. Peter's Eaton Square School, London.
- Archibald Muir, lately Works Manager, Methil Works, Redpath De Groot Caledonian Ltd.
- Stanley Frederick Mullett, Production Director, United Rum Merchants Ltd.
- Ronald James Murphy, Senior Executive Officer, Ministry of Defence.
- Betty Nelmes, Administrator, Royal Institution of South Wales.
- Mildred Mary Nevile, General Secretary, Catholic Institute For International Relations.
- Mair Frankwen Nicholas, Headmistress, Prendergast Infants School, Haverfordwest.
- Robert Lawrence Nicholson. For political service.
- David Nicoll, Deputy Firemaster, Tayside Fire Brigade.
- Joyce Iris Kathleen Norris, Head of Common Services, Basildon District Council.
- Norman Frank Naylor Norris, lately Member, Eastleigh Borough Council.
- Patricia Norton, Member, Greenwich & Bexley Area Health Authority.
- James Buhner O'Cain, Area Engineer (Durham), United Automobile Services Ltd.
- Major Gordon Cecil Ormsby, lately Retired Officer Grade II, Ministry of Defence.
- Ian Edwin Osbourne, Deputy Chief Administrative Officer, Lincolnshire Police.
- Dorothy Muriel Parker, lately Area Nurse, Salford Area Health Authority.
- Lois Mary Parkin, Wages Officer, Hants & Dorset Motor Services Ltd.
- Raymond Thomas Partridge. For political and public service in the West Midlands.
- Alexander Paterson, lately Port Naval Auxiliary Officer, Northern Ireland.
- Edith Muriel Patterson. For political and public service in the East Midlands.
- Francis Earl Pearce, lately Professional and Technology Officer I, Department of the Environment.
- Joyce Lilac Madeline Pearce. For services to fencing.
- Thomas Peet. For political and public service in the North West.
- John Simpson Paton Philip, Principal, Chadacre Agricultural Institute, Suffolk.
- Coralie Dora Plant, Senior Executive Officer, Health & Safety Executive, Department of Employment.
- Nelson Platt, District Engineer, North West Water Authority.
- Edward Hennys Plumley, Clerk to the Trustees of the Kenfig Corporation Property, Mid Glamorgan.
- Robert Eddie James Pockett, Area Manager, South Western Region, British Gas Corporation.
- Winnie Morrison Potter, lately Chairman, Newbury Old People's Welfare Association.
- William George Pratt. For services to the Waterlooville Musical Players, Hampshire.
- Elisabeth Muriel Pring, Foreign & Commonwealth Office.
- Grace Campbell Pritchard, Principal, New Lodge Nursery School, Belfast.
- Clifford Prophett, lately Editor, Staffordshire Sentinel Newspapers Ltd.
- Geoffrey Arthur Pyman, Principal Administrative Officer, Essex County Council.
- John Dawson Hieron Radford, Air Pilot. For services to aerial photography and conservation.
- John Wilkinson Ramsay. For services to bakery education in Newcastle upon Tyne.
- John Edward Rapson, Director, Hovercraft Development Ltd.
- Jane Rawlinson, Travelling Organiser (Headquarters), Women's Royal Voluntary Service.
- Vera Ray, Higher Executive Officer, Central Office of Information.
- Ivy May Read, lately Executive Officer, Crown Estate Commissioners.
- Donald Edmund Richards, District Officer, Solent District, HM Coastguard, Department of Trade.
- Joan Richardson, Area Health Education Officer, Hereford & Worcester Area Health Authority.
- Trevor Stanley Riches, Director, South Western Region, National Federation of Building Trades Employers.
- Cecil Samuel Rickarby, Head of Group, Operational Programming Department, Telecommunications Headquarters, Post Office.
- Ronald Henry Ring, Head of Technical Advisory Group, S. G. Brown.
- Frank Robinson, Education Officer (Careers), Somerset County Council.
- Henry John Rogers, Mill Manager, C. Townsend Hook & Co. Ltd.
- Jeremy Charles Rogers, Boat Builder, Lymington.
- James Cecil Cumine Russell. For political and public service in Wessex.
- Jean Elizabeth Rutledge, Higher Executive Officer, Board of Customs & Excise.
- Ronald Peter Sagar, Superintendent, Humberside Police.
- Mary Saville, Pensions Officer, Coleraine Branch, Royal British Legion.
- Olive Mary Sawyer, Executive Officer, Department of Employment.
- Joseph Mortlock Scruby, lately Professional and Technology Officer Grade I, Ministry of Defence.
- Stanley Frank Shearman, Director, Administration & Personnel, GKN Bound Brook Ltd.
- James Alexander Buchan Shepherd, Principal Administrative Officer (Teacher Staffing), Lanark Division, Strathclyde Region.
- Muriel Shepherd, Deputy Headteacher, Glebe School, Darlington.
- Marion Dalrymple Sillar, Administrative Assistant, Scottish Regional Office, British Institute of Management.
- Charles Duncan Morrison Simmons, Representative For Stirling, Forces Help Society and Lord Roberts' Workshops.
- John Alexander Sloan, Steward Class I, Prison Service.
- Albert George Smith, Managing Director, James W. Cook & Co. (Wivenhoe) Ltd.
- Colin Smith, Deputy Head Teacher, Wensleydale Middle School, Blyth.
- John Smith, Field Support Engineer, Kinloss, British Aerospace.
- Philip Sascha Smith. For services to the Teesside Marriage Guidance Council.
- Rachael Elizabeth Smith, Higher Executive Officer, Ministry of Defence.
- Stanley Robert Smith, Telecommunications Technical Officer Grade I, Meteorological Office.
- Christania Vera Smurthwaite, Metropolitan District Organiser, North Tyneside, Women's Royal Voluntary Service.
- Harry Victor Somers, lately Assistant Officer, Board of Customs & Excise.
- Arthur Leonard Sparks, Chairman and Managing Director, De Vere (Kensington) Ltd. For services to export.
- Peter Nelson Spencer, President and Chairman, Merseyside Branch, British Limbless Ex-Service Men's Association.
- Roy Frederick Stevens, Member of Council, Radio Society of Great Britain.
- Robert Alexander Stewart, Superintendent, Royal Ulster Constabulary.
- Agnes Ormiston Peat Still, Chief Inspector, Strathclyde Police.
- Dorothy Walton Stout, Secretary (Legal), Keeble Hawson, Steele Carr & Co., Sheffield.
- Kathleen Sutton, Member, Thamesdown Citizens Advice Bureau, Wiltshire.
- Audrey Swales, Head Teacher, Barden County Junior School, Burnley.
- Charles Alfred Swan, Senior Scientific Officer, Ministry of Agriculture, Fisheries & Food.
- Beryl May Symons, Higher Executive Officer, Department of Employment.
- Tony Walter Tanner, Chief Engineer and Energy Conservation Officer, Cheshire County Council.
- Frederick Harold Tapping, Works Manager, Rolls-Royce Ltd.
- Albert Edward Tattum. For services to the community in Wigan and Leigh.
- Norman Oldfield Page Taylor, General Secretary, National Federation of Sub-Postmasters.
- Walton Ninian Telfer, Organising Secretary, Lancashire Association of Boys' Clubs.
- David Elgar Theophilus, Senior Executive Officer, Department of Employment.
- William Lamb Thom, Assistant Governor I, Foston Hall Detention Centre, Derbyshire.
- James Dawson Thomson, Secretary and Treasurer, Scottish National Federation For the Welfare of the Blind.
- Jean Todd, Field Officer, Northern Ireland Association For Mental Health.
- John Vigers Henry Tompkins. For services to the Malvern Festival Theatre.
- Joseph Michael Totterdell, Safety Engineer, Constructors John Brown Ltd.
- Winifred May Townroe, Member, Mansfield District Council.
- Friedrich Ernst Albrecht Turk, Secretary, Community Relations Committee, Society of Friends.
- Pamela Anne Mary Colston-Turner, lately Senior Executive Officer, Office of HM Procurator General and Treasury Solicitor.
- Ruth Threlfall Vickery, Chairman, Cleveland Supplementary Benefit Appeal Tribunal.
- William John Yokes. For services to Barnet & Finchley Community Health Council.
- John Richard Wallace, Local Officer II, Department of Health & Social Security.
- Eileen Ellen Waller, Hospital Sister, Maudsley Hospital, London.
- Edward Austin Walsh, Lecturer in Education, School of Education, University of Liverpool.
- Ann Waltuck. For services to University House Legal Advice Bureau, Bethnal Green, London.
- Clifford Arthur Ward, Managing Director, W. Richards & Sons Ltd. For services to export.
- William Warren, Agricultural Editor, Belfast News Letter.
- George Alexander Watt, Freelance Journalist.
- James Park Watt. For services to boxing.
- Leslie George Webb, Purser/Catering Officer, Weymouth, British Rail.
- Esther Evelyn Weeks, Departmental Sister, Weston-Super-Mare General Hospital, Avon Area Health Authority.
- Jean Mary McColl Weir, Senior Executive Officer, Ministry of Defence.
- Elizabeth Ann Wells. For political service.
- Christopher Lewis Westmacott. For political service in Northern England.
- Eurwen White. For political and public service in Wales.
- Joseph Charles Whiting, lately Assistant Education Officer (Special Schools), Norfolk Local Education Authority.
- Meirion Williams. For service to the National Association of Boys' Clubs in Wales.
- Naomi Elsie Williams, Community Dental Officer, Leicestershire Area Health Authority.
- Olwen Williams, Area Nurse, Surrey Area Health Authority.
- Reginald James Williams, lately Group Officer, Preston, National Society for the Prevention of Cruelty to Children.
- Stanley Williams, General Secretary, Birmingham and West Midlands, Margery Fry Memorial Trust.
- Wendy Elizabeth Wills, lately Member, South West Water Authority.
- Audrey Wilson. For services to Alder Hey Children's Hospital.
- John Raymond Wilson, Manager, Valve & Elcos Division, Mullard Ltd.
- Lilian Joyce Wilton, lately Clerical Officer, Ministry of Defence.
- Nora Kathleen Woll, General Medical Practitioner, Bottesford, Nottingham.
- Arthur Edmund Wood, lately Senior Executive Officer, Ordnance Survey.
- Geoffrey Woodhead, Head of Technology Division, Northern Spinning Division, Courtaulds Ltd.
- John Wright, Higher Executive Officer, Board of Inland Revenue.
- Nancy Mary Wright, Field Interviewer, Office of Population Censuses and Surveys.
- Penelope Pheona Wright, Senior Engineer, Research & Development, Electrical & Musical Industries Ltd.
- Arthur Gordon Wyatt, Councillor, East Staffordshire District and Staffordshire County Councils.
- Joseph Abboud, lately Pensions Officer, HM Embassy, Tel Aviv.
- Keith Wallace Adams, Senior Commercial Officer, British Trade Office, Christchurch.
- Robert Patrick Ashe. For welfare services to refugees in Thailand.
- Angel Liborio Ayuso. For public services in Belize.
- Paul Randolph Beck. For services to the British community in Athens.
- Elizabeth Anne Blouse, lately Consular Clerk, British Consulate-General, St. Louis.
- The Reverend William Thomas Bodden. For public services in the Cayman Islands.
- Francis Arnold Ellis Boor, for services to the British community in Madrid.
- Chun-Ying Chan, Principal Training Officer, Civil Aid Services, Hong Kong.
- Eric Chapman, Vice-Consul (Commercial), British Consulate-General, Lille.
- Teresa Siori Chapman. For services to the British community in Buenos Aires.
- Irene Cheng Tong. Senior Personal Secretary, Government Secretariat, Hong Kong.
- Dr. Yuen-Kai Ching. For services to technical education in Hong Kong.
- Mildred Clary, for services to British cultural interests in France.
- Frederick Alan Crump. For services to the British community in California.
- Elena Cruz, Nursing Sister, Medical Department, Gibraltar.
- Jean Eleanor Dale. For welfare services to the community in Kenya.
- Robert Edward Delves Deffee, Vice-Consul, HM Embassy, Dubai.
- Terence Egan. For services to maritime safety in Iran.
- Arthur Edward Garland, Vice-Consul (Shipping), British Consulate-General, Rotterdam.
- Diana Mary Garner. For welfare services to the community in Zambia.
- Charlton Steward Gedge, Vice-Consul (Commercial), British Consulate-General, Rio de Janeiro.
- Robert Hugh Gordon, lately Attache, British High Commission, Lusaka.
- Ursula Margaret Hallifax, Consular Officer, British High Commission, Nassau.
- Florence Mary Hickson, lately Personal Assistant to HM Ambassador, Baghdad.
- Ian Ashley Howard, Technical Counsellor to the Chief Minister, New Hebrides Condominium.
- Yvonne Hughes, lately Administration Assistant, British Deputy High Commission, Kaduna.
- Allen Henry John Jenkins, Technical Adviser, Police Department, Belize.
- Janet Thelma Kilian, Administration Officer, British Consulate-General, Johannesburg.
- Betty Muriel Kitson. For welfare services To Children in Bermunda.
- Francis Latham. For services to maritime safety in Bahrain.
- Cyril Arthur Lawrence, JP. For public services in St. Helena.
- Sydney Norman Lee, Administration Officer, British High Commission, Lusaka.
- Willy Lissaman, Vice-Consul, British Consulate-General, Amsterdam.
- Lieutenant Colonel Donald Frederick Lloyd, (Ret'd), lately Acting Head of Section, Defence Support Division, NATO, Brussels.
- Alistair William Mckenzie, lately Third Secretary, HM Embassy, San Salvador.
- Ian George Walker Mackie. For services to British Interests in Iran.
- Gillian Freda Marx, Librarian, British Council, Tel Aviv.
- Charles Anthony Gwennap Moore, TD. For services to the British community in Palermo.
- The Reverend James Gilbert Morrison. For services to the British community in Rotterdam.
- Maria Elena Murre de Witham, Personal Assistant, British Council, Buenos Aires.
- Julia Scott Nairn. For welfare services to the community in Portugal.
- Pauline Annie O'Grady, Personal Assistant, HM Embassy, Bonn.
- Genevieve Berry Pacquement. For welfare services to the British community in Paris.
- Dorothy Jane Pearey, lately Personal Assistant, Office of the Governor, Salisbury.
- Dr. John Keith Prosser. For medical and welfare services to the community in Paraguay.
- Major Ashton Norman O'Donnell Rayner. For public services in Bermuda.
- David Norman Reddaway, Second Secretary, HM Embassy, Tehran.
- Mary Pollock Rowe. For services to the British community in Liberia.
- Muriel Audrey Rust, Personal Assistant, HM Embassy, Rabat.
- Basil David Sands. For services to British cultural and commercial interest in Australia.
- Bertus Schulp, Vice-Consul, British Consulate General, Rotterdam.
- Phyllis Phygenia Shirley, Private Secretary to the Governor, British Virgin Islands.
- Edna Mary Staple. For nursing and welfare services to the community in Zaire.
- Norman Edward Stone. For services to veterinary development in Yemen.
- Michael Frederick Sullivan, Consul (Commercial), British Trade Development Office, New York.
- Lourdes Vallejo. For services to education in Gibraltar.
- Gweneth Elizabeth Vidler-Dulles, for services to the British community in Grenoble.
- Mary Mollison Walker, Assistant Education Officer, British Council, Paris.
- Sik-Kong Wong. For community services in Hong Kong.
- Isobella Margaret Wood, for welfare services to the community in Kabul.
- Pun-Chak Yu, CPM, Senior Superintendent of Police, Royal Hong Kong Police Force.

Australian States

State of Victoria

- Noel Dudley Anderson, of Mount Waverley. For public service.
- Alan George Barker, of Toorak. For service to the English Speaking Union.
- Frank Vincent Bibby, of Ringwood. For service to sport.
- Councillor John Ernest Bown, of East Brighton. For municipal service.
- Morris Charles Evans, of Benalla. For service to the Benalla Hospital and the community.
- The Right Reverend William Frederick Gilmour, of South Yarra. For service to the Presbyterian Church.
- Winifred Ethel Griffiths, of Kew. For service to early childhood education.
- Councillor Victor Richard Michael, of Lalor. For municipal service.
- Stella Nemet, of Springvale. For service to music.
- Charles Edward Newman, MC, of Numurkah. For community service.
- Margaret Josephine Nisbett Weaving, of Regent. For service to music.
- Elizabeth May Pearson, of Berwick. For community service.
- Horace Robert Prescott, of Wilby. For community service.
- Raymond Edward Quinn, of Kilmore. For municipal service.
- Councillor William Richards, of Swan Hill. For service to swimming.
- Councillor Oswald Abraham Ruff, of Sale. For municipal service.

State of Queensland

- Allan Cecil Cameron, DFM, of via Chinchilla. For services to ex-service men and women.
- James Fitzgerald Fraser, of Proserpine. For services to the community.
- Lillian May Hansen, of Wondai. For services to charity.
- Frank Wilfaelm Heck, of Woongoolba. For services to the community and the sugar industry.
- Dr. Marie Laura Jameson, of Newmarket. For service to sub-normal children's welfare.
- Gordon Thomas Mackereth, of Kingaroy. For community service.
- John Alexander Maclean, of Bardon. For services to cricket.
- Mary McKie, of Mitchelton. For service to the scouting movement.
- Rosanna Phipps, of Taroom. For community service.
- Herbert See Poy, of Innisfail. For community service.
- John Peter Victor Valmadre, of Kelsey Creek. For services to the sugar industry.
- Councillor Albert Walter White, of Biggenden. For service to local government and to the community.

State of South Australia

- Noble Sydney Douglas Buckley, of Coromandel Valley. For service to aviation.
- Tennyson George Clark, MC, of Beaumont. For services to the dairying industry.
- Lewis Albert Dawe, of Norwood. For services to choral singing and charity.
- Arthur Donald Andrew Dodgson, of Mount Cooper. For community service.
- Howard Norman Flaherty, of North Glenelg. For services to the aged.
- Desmond James Moran, of Lockleys. For services to sport.
- Ronald Edwin Nash, of Henley Beach. For services to local government and the community.
- Gerald Adrian Phillips, of Hove. For services to sport.
- Eric Bertram Ridgway, DFC, of Wolseley. For services to local government and the St. John Council for South Australia.

State of Western Australia

- Dorothy Joan Dowson, of Mosman Park. For services to the Red Cross and to ex-service men and women.
- Samuel Gilkison, of Como. For services to ballroom dancing.
- Alfred Hampton, of Belmont. For services to the poultry industry.
- Dorothy Rona Haywood, of Doubleview. For services to the Country Women's Association.
- Albert Francis Hood, of Roleystone. For services to the disabled.
- Terence Syddall, of Memora. For service to Aboriginal communities.

=== Companion of the Imperial Service Order (ISO) ===
Home Civil Service

- Keith Bannock, Professional and Technology Superintendent, Ministry of Defence.
- Frederick James Beesley, Principal, HM Stationery Office.
- Leslie George Bishop, Principal Professional and Technology Officer, Ministry of Defence.
- John Levi Caddy, Principal, Welsh Office.
- Kenneth Norman Francis Chick, lately Senior Principal, Ministry of Agriculture, Fisheries & Food.
- Joseph Young Dickinson, lately Senior Principal, Ministry of Defence.
- Walter Kenneth Stephen Emberson, lately Principal, Board of Customs & Excise.
- Norman William Griffiths, Principal Collector, Board of Inland Revenue.
- Charles Lesiter Hawson, lately Principal Scientific Officer, Meteorological Office.
- Frank Colbert House, Senior Principal, Department of Health & Social Security.
- Herbert Moore Humphreys, Head of Computer Service, Department of Health & Social Services, Northern Ireland.
- Raymond Leonard Knott, Principal, National Engineering Laboratory.
- John Lister, Senior Principal, Department of Industry.
- Kenneth William Methven, lately Principal, Ministry of Defence.
- Henry Morrell, Inspector, Board of Inland Revenue.
- George Paterson, Principal, Scottish Office.
- Roger Frederick Souter Port, Superintending Valuer, Board of Inland Revenue.
- William John Willett Price, Principal Medicines Inspector, Department of Health & Social Security.
- William Brand Rennie, Senior Principal, Department of the Environment.
- Edward Thorold Swindale Roberts, lately Principal, Department of Transport.
- Ernest William Charles Smart, MC, Inspector, Board of Inland Revenue.
- James Alastair Wilson, lately Senior Principal, Department of Employment.
- Wilfred Winnard, lately Senior Principal, HM Treasury.
- Margaret Mary Wood, Principal, Department of Trade.

Diplomatic Service & Overseas List

- Alan John Carter, Deputy Director of Immigration, Hong Kong.

Australian States

State of Victoria

- Bert Andrew Jellicoe Keddie, of Lower Plenty. For public service.
- Dr. David Sutcliffe Wishart, of Malvern. For public service.

State of Queensland

- William Hansen, of Mount Gravatt. For public service.

State of South Australia

- Robert Wallace Oliver, of Unley Park. For public service.

State of Western Australia

- Thomas James Lewis, of Applecross, Under-Secretary for Works.

=== British Empire Medal (BEM) ===
Military Division

Royal Navy

- Chief Marine Engineering Mechanic (M) Richard Vernon Abbott, QD982570E, Royal Naval Reserve.
- Marine Phillip Barlow, P022818Q, Royal Marines.
- Petty Officer Marine Engineering Mechanic (M) Rodney Arthur Betts, K970612B.
- Chief Petty Officer (Ops) (S) Ian Roger Camburn, D050727W.
- Chief Petty Officer Stores Accountant Peter Leonard Carter, D071043X.
- Marine Engineering Artificer (H) 1 David Cook, M923110C.
- Sergeant Clement Coulson, P032681Q, Royal Marines.
- Chief Petty Officer Physical Trainer Derek Lewis Charles Cousins, J983450H.
- Sergeant Bugler David Gerald Patrick Dawson, P019878L, Royal Marines.
- Chief Weapons Engineering Artificer (R) Anthony Russel Fee, D055275G.
- Colour Sergeant Gerald Hanratty, P017110H, Royal Marines.
- Chief Wren Writer (Pay) Jean Harris, W120898W.
- Master At Arms Bernard Kilford, M959016L.
- Chief Radio Supervisor Edward William Larkins, D983103C, Royal Naval Reserve.
- Sergeant Thomas Henry Little, P018646U, Royal Marines.
- Chief Weapons Engineering Artificer Alan Richard Marsh, M943725D.
- Medical Technician 1 Errol Nickson, D090645N.
- Chief Petty Officer Cook Bruce John Pettigrew, M981753R.
- Chief Marine Engineering Artificer (P) James George Selwood, M943945A.
- Chief Petty Officer (Diver) Terence Settle, D055652W.
- Chief Radio Supervisor Robert William Strout, J966177T.
- Chief Petty Officer (Seaman) John Henry Thompson, J899460R.
- Chief Wren Quarters Assistant Carol Anne Watkins, W118210C.
- Chief Petty Officer Ronald Walter Wills, ZD984950H, Royal Naval Reserve.

Army

- 24027799 Staff Sergeant Richard Abrams, Royal Army Ordnance Corps.
- 24056520 Staff Sergeant Terrence Clifford Atkinson, 13th/18th Royal Hussars (Queen Mary's Own).
- 24068347 Sergeant Roger Barnett, Corps of Royal Electrical & Mechanical Engineers.
- 24154052 Sergeant Peter John Bedford, Royal Army Ordnance Corps.
- 23686013 Staff Sergeant Kenneth Ronald Best, Corps of Royal Electrical & Mechanical Engineers.
- 23869105 Corporal Cyril Mervyn Bishop, The Queen's Regiment.
- 23836380 Staff Sergeant John Arthur Bunn, The Royal Regiment of Fusiliers.
- 23841302 Staff Sergeant William Raymond Michael Cardwell, Royal Corps of Signals.
- W/332433 Private (Acting Sergeant) Dorothy Margaret Clough, Women's Royal Army Corps.
- 23495680 Staff Sergeant (now Acting Warrant Officer Class 2) Thomas Mervin Collier, Irish Guards.
- 23206294 Staff Sergeant Tom Cook, Coldstream Guards.
- 24139470 Corporal (Local Sergeant) James Horace Crickmay, Royal Corps of Transport.
- 23495682 Staff Sergeant Christopher Patrick Deane, Irish Guards.
- 23863889 Staff Sergeant Allan Thomas Dippie, The Black Watch (Royal Highland Regiment).
- 23478265 Sergeant Peter Eastop, Corps of Royal Electrical & Mechanical Engineers.
- 24022890 Staff Sergeant William Elliott, Corps of Royal Electrical & Mechanical Engineers.
- 23705154 Sergeant Louis Edward Gallagher, Corps of Royal Engineers.
- 24360023 Lance Sergeant Eamonn Andrew Grace, Irish Guards.
- 24092630 Staff Sergeant Nigel Patrick Grace, Royal Army Ordnance Corps.
- 22697864 Sergeant Edward Anthony John Hillier Corps of Royal Electrical & Mechanical Engineers, Territorial Army.
- 24071075 Staff Sergeant William John Hunter, Royal Corps of Transport.
- 22818007 Staff Sergeant Denis Arthur Jones, Royal Corps of Transport, Territorial Army.
- 23284208 Sergeant John Jones, Royal Army Ordnance Corps.
- 23969276 Staff Corporal Geoffrey Sidney Knowles, The Life Guards.
- 24364812 Lance Corporal (now Corporal) Philip Kevin Langan, Royal Army Ordnance Corps.
- 24086610 Sergeant Phillip Lawson, 13th/18th Royal Hussars (Queen Mary's Own).
- 24200213 Lance Corporal (Acting Corporal) Edward John McLean, the Black Watch (Royal Highland Regiment).
- W/456138 Lance Corporal (Acting Corporal) Andrea Maud McNish, Women's Royal Army Corps.
- 21155243 Sergeant Meherman Limbu, 10th Princess Mary's Own Gurkha Rifles.
- 21155149 Sergeant Meherman Tamang, 7th Duke of Edinburgh's Own Gurkha Rifles.
- 23676901 Staff Sergeant Michael Edmund Moore, Corps of Royal Electrical & Mechanical Engineers.
- 23983900 Staff Sergeant Gwyn Hopkin Morgan, Royal Corps of Transport.
- 24105687 Sergeant John Mugford, Royal Corps of Signals.
- W/434957 Sergeant Maureen Ellen Mullany, Women's Royal Army Corps.
- 22618571 Staff Sergeant James Gordon Murray, Military Provost Staff Corps (now discharged).
- 24046245 Staff Sergeant John Richard Prince, Royal Army Pay Corps.
- 21158389 Corporal Raghubir Rai, 7th Duke of Edinburgh's Own Gurkha Rifles.
- 24007195 Staff Sergeant William George Rule, Royal Army Ordnance Corps.
- 23547844 Staff Sergeant Colin Ryecroft, 9th/12th Royal Lancers (Prince of Wales's).
- LS/14442236 Sergeant (Local Staff Sergeant) Ernest John Sennett, the Royal Anglian Regiment.
- 24000230 Staff Sergeant John Anthony Steel, Grenadier Guards.
- 23745465 Staff Sergeant David Harry Straw, Corps of Royal Electrical & Mechanical Engineers.
- 23229534 Staff Sergeant John Taylor, Scots Guards.
- 24098678 Corporal Graham Alfred Tyler, Corps of Royal Engineers.
- 23861516 Staff Sergeant Nakeleto Vakavodokinaivalu, Royal Regiment of Artillery.
- 23975397 Staff Sergeant John Robert Wallace, Royal Corps of Signals.
- 22232282 Sergeant Richard Walton, Royal Corps of Transport.
- 23857221 Sergeant (Acting Staff Sergeant) Hugh Hamilton Watson, Corps of Royal Electrical & Mechanical Engineers.
- 24042253 Sergeant Graham Robert Willis, Corps of Royal Electrical & Mechanical Engineers.
- 23514261 Staff Sergeant Harold Winter, Royal Pioneer Corps.

Royal Air Force

- Q4261760 Flight Sergeant Roger Henry Arrowsmith.
- X1927952 Flight Sergeant Neil Bland.
- T4185838 Flight Sergeant Barrie Clifton.
- W4179712 Flight Sergeant David Stanley Edward Gutsell.
- J4008293 Flight Sergeant Paul Keane, AFM.
- P0680183 Flight Sergeant John Storey MacKenzie.
- A0593478 Flight Sergeant David William Makin.
- H5063912 Flight Sergeant Brian Arthur Payne.
- K2278196 Flight Sergeant James Pye.
- M4145389 Flight Sergeant William Smith.
- K4170940 Flight Sergeant Michael Edward Tanner.
- H1922209 Flight Sergeant Brian Williams.
- D3504163 Flight Sergeant William Barrie Tulloch Wilson.
- L0686392 Chief Technician Christopher Rayner Harris.
- R4255618 Sergeant Alistair Davidson.
- J1938435 Sergeant John Edward Alfred Finch.
- Gl950259 Sergeant Norman Thomas Pinnock.
- N4265432 Sergeant Timothy Sheehan.
- U4287424 Sergeant Michael William Silver, RAF Regiment.
- N1948435 Sergeant Keith Victor Taylor.
- M4280272 Sergeant John Tuck, RAF Regiment.
- K8099282 Corporal Christopher Charles Chandler, RAF Regiment.
- R1941516 Corporal James Logan Christie.
- B8089656 Corporal Edwin Mamis Martin Doyle.
- X4285416 Corporal Malcolm Ernest John Nicholls.

Civil Division

United Kingdom

- Catherine Farrell Elliott Adams, Domestic Assistant, Royal Observatory, Edinburgh.
- John Thomas Allen, Storekeeper, Department of Energy.
- John Albert Allum, Fitting and Sheet Metal Shop Supervisor, ML Aviation Co. Ltd., Maidenhead.
- Albert Henry Anderson, Leading Ambulanceman, Northern Ireland Ambulance Service.
- Alexander Anderson, Professional and Technology Officer III (M & E), Department of the Environment.
- William Anderson, for service to the community in the Upper Tweed Area.
- Thomas Edward Ashcroft, Fault Analyst, Thorn Consumer Electronics Ltd., Gosport.
- Francis Hudson Ashmore, Head Waiter, Refreshment Department, House of Commons.
- Charles Gerard Ashton, Cashier, National Council of Social Service.
- John Darley Ayers, Constable, Metropolitan Police.
- Roy Wilfred Bacon, Site Electrical Foreman, Hinkley Point Nuclear Power Station, Nuclear Power Co. Ltd.
- Frank Bailey, Progress Controller, Airscrew Howden Ltd.
- Ronald Edward Baker, Catering Manager Grade C, Metropolitan Police.
- Betty Evelyn Ballantyne, Local Organiser, St. Boswells, Women's Royal Voluntary Service.
- Joseph Bangs, Railman, King's Cross Freight Terminal, British Rail.
- Raymond Samuel William Barfoot, Warrant Officer, Lincolnshire & South Humberside Wing, Air Training Corps.
- Margaret Bartlett, Head of Workroom, (State Embroideries), Royal School of Needlework.
- James Bartram, Foreman, Charlton Leslie Offshore.
- Nicholas Bates, Superintendent, Elswick Dene Aged Persons Home, Newcastle upon Tyne City Council.
- Mervyn Beattie, Chief Officer Class I, HM Prison Service.
- George William Beegan, Auxiliary Electrical Worker, Department of the Environment.
- Arthur Peter Bennett, Craftsman Instrument Maker, Atomic Weapons Research Establishment, Aldermaston, Ministry of Defence.
- James Stanley Birch, Road Foreman, Lancashire County Council.
- Munro Albert Bird, Cook/Steward, Wimpey Marine Ltd.
- Lilian May Blandford, Photoprinter Grade I, Department of Industry.
- John Markey Boyd, Head Groundsman, Notre Dame College of Education, Bearsden, Glasgow.
- Edith Joyce Bradbury, Dining Room Supervisor, Derby Lonsdale College of Higher Education.
- Vivien Laura Brenan, Deputy County Organiser, Devon, Women's Royal Voluntary Service.
- Leslie Cecil Brench, Grounds Manager, Crystal Palace National Sports Centre.
- Walter Bridge, Superintendent, Industrial and Admiralty Systems Department, Dowty Boulton Paul Ltd., Wolverhampton.
- Mary Gladys Brook, lately Cook Super Viser, Sandown High School, Isle of Wight.
- Thomas Leo Brophy, Assistant Administrative Instructor and Volunteer Sergeant Major Instructor, Army Cadet Force.
- Angustus William Brown, Nursing Auxiliary, Buckland Hospital, Dover, Kent Area Health Authority.
- Norman Brown, Chief Inspector, T. S. Harrison & Sons Ltd.
- Alan Burns, Sub Officer, Northumberland Fire Brigade.
- George Frederick Henry Bushell, Leading Fire Man, London Fire Brigade.
- Derek Francis Butler, Sergeant, South Wales Constabulary.
- Alexander William Cameron, Senior Prison Officer, Glenochil Detention Centre.
- Alfred John Herbert Champion, Senior Progress Hand, Acton Works, London Transport Executive.
- Albert Arthur Clark, Manager, Central Messing Store, Navy, Army & Air Force Institutes, Aldershot.
- Ethel Clark. For services to the community in Tyne & Wear.
- John William Edward Clark, Pipefitter, Ransomes & Rapier Ltd., Ipswich.
- Ena Evelyn Clarke, Cleaner, Port of London Authority.
- Reginald Clarke, Shift Electrician's Assistant, Sandbach Works, BP Chemicals.
- Geoffrey Robert Clasby, Station Manager, New Haven Harbour, British Railways.
- Norah Marion Jean Clements. For services to the community in Stocksfield, Northumberland.
- John Lionel Clifford, Senior Foreman, Sterling Wharfage Ltd.
- Samuel Cocking, Bus Driver, Bristol Omnibus Co. Ltd.
- Philomena Mary Coghlan (Sister Philomena), Leader, Wigton Boys' Club, Cumbria.
- Reginald Samuel James Cole, Leading Ambulance Man, Northern Ireland Ambulance Service.
- Herbert George Collins, lately Instructional Officer Grade III, Billingham Skillcentre, Department of Employment.
- George Thorburn Colven. For services to the Scottish fishing industry.
- Rosa Corns, Postmistress, Chorley, Nantwich, Cheshire.
- Frederick Eady Coull, Warden, Sands of Forvie National Nature Reserve, Nature Conservancy Council.
- George Dickie Coulter, Foreman, J. & W. Robinson (Glasgow) Ltd., Glasgow.
- Walter Henry Cousins, Milkman, Express Dairy Ltd.
- Alfred Edward Cox, Professional and Technology Officer Grade 3, Ministry of Defence.
- Roy Kenneth Crabb, Supervisor, Civil Engineering Department, Southern Region British Railways.
- George Hewitt Cripps, Experimental Worker II, Warren Spring Laboratory.
- Margaret Anne Cromar. For service to the community in Banchory.
- Frederick Edward Crux, Heavy Goods Vehicle Driver, Thames Water Authority.
- John Gordon Cubitt, Sub-Divisional Officer, Suffolk Special Constabulary.
- Nellie Cumberbatch, lately Storekeeper, Royal Ordnance Factory, Chorley, Ministry of Defence.
- James Love Davidson, Higher Grade Cartographic Surveyor, Ordnance Survey.
- John Lewis Davies, Technician I, Gang Foreman, Preston Telephone Area, North Western Telecommunications Board, The Post Office.
- George Raymond Dent, Head Shepherd and Sheep Farm Manager, Durham.
- Dorothy Mildred Denton. For service to the community in East Cowes.
- Thomas Henry Dickinson, Receptionist, Head Office, British Steel Corporation.
- John Dickson, lately Shepherd, High Plewlands, Lanarkshire.
- John Drinkwater, Slideway Grinder, Staveley Machine Tools Ltd.
- David Miller Duncanson, Superintendent, Royal Scottish Museum.
- Edward Thomas Dunn, Steward I, Wardroom HMS Excellent, Ministry of Defence.
- George John Edney, Coal Delivery Man, Burrell & Co. (Radlett) Ltd.
- Anthony George Elliott, Process and General Supervisory Grade E, HMS Raleigh, Ministry of Defence.
- Sarah Esther Etherson, Dining Room Supervisor, Glasgow Dental Hospital and School.
- William Evans, Constable, North Wales Police.
- Willie Fearon, Underground Worker, Grime Thorpe Colliery, Barnsley Area, National Coal Board.
- David Mitchell Ferrie, Foreman Mechanic, Scottish & Newcastle Breweries Ltd.
- John James Wallace Finlay, Sergeant, Royal Ulster Constabulary.
- Eric Roy Fox, Supply Operator, Wessex Water Authority.
- Clifford Clarence Gabelle, Foreign & Commonwealth Office.
- Maisie Gallagher, Cleaner, Department For National Savings.
- Thomas Garrity, Burner, Lackenby Works, Teesside Division, British Steel Corporation.
- Cement John George. For services to the community, particularly the elderly and handicapped in Cumbria.
- Elizabeth Catherine Gibb, District Organiser, Enfield District, London Borough of Enfield, Women's Royal Voluntary Service.
- Marianne Dora Gilder, Caretaker, HQ East Anglia, Territorial Auxiliary & Volunteer Reserve Association.
- Gordon Francis Goddard, Youth Leader, Moor Lane Youth Centre, York.
- Alexander Gordon, Car Park Attendant, Department of Finance, Northern Ireland.
- Graham Joseph Gould, Machine Operator, Hardy Spicer Ltd.
- George Edward Grant, Handyman/Maintenance Assistant, Arts Council of Great Britain.
- Desmond Harold Gray, Roller, Glynwed Steels Ltd.
- Albert Leonard Robert Green, Chief Cook I, Royal Hospital Chelsea.
- George Grieve, Control Officer, Dunfermline Ambulance Station.
- Albert Raymond Guest, Departmental Manager, Kiveton Park Steel & Wire Works Ltd.
- John Alexander Guthrie, Constable, Ministry of Defence Police.
- Jabez Hall, lately Chief Office Keeper, British Museum (Natural History).
- Albert Edward Hardy, Turner, Marine Diesel Division, St. Peter's Works, Clark Hawthorn Ltd.
- William Charles Hardy, Technical Superintendent of Cyclotrons, Physics Department, University of Birmingham.
- Clara Kathleen Harris, Flasher Setter, Lucas Electrical Ltd.
- Joan Irene Moira Haughney, Reproduction Grade B2, Ordnance Survey.
- Ralph Edward Hearn, Divisional Staff Sergeant, St. John Ambulance, High Wycombe, Buckinghamshire.
- Cyril Francis Frank Henson, Walking Training Instructor, Artificial Limb and Appliance Centre, Cardiff.
- Albert Herschell, Senior Foreman, Bonar Long & Co. Ltd., Dundee.
- James Alfred Higgins, lately Clerk of Works, Lincoln Cathedral.
- John William Hill, Professional and Technology Officer 4, Ministry of Defence.
- Sheila Holtom, Telephone Operator, Coventry Skillcentre, Department of Employment.
- Margaret Nellie Houston, Senior Enrolled Nurse, Glenlomond Hospital.
- Brenda Ingman, Basic Grade Cartographic Draughtsman, Department of Transport.
- Donald Roy James, Ganger, London Transport Executive.
- Clive Jefferies, Sergeant, Gloucestershire Constabulary.
- David Jenkins, Plant Operator, Hinkley Point A nuclear power station, South Western Region, Central Electricity Generating Board.
- Sarah Ethel Jenkins, Warden, Old People's Home, Eaton Close, Leominster.
- George William Johnson, Highway Superintendent, Cheshire County Council.
- Thomas Purvis Johnson, Stores Supervisor, Monks & Crane Ltd. (Thorn EMI Ltd.).
- Alec Charles Jones, Superintendent, Belfast City Hall.
- Cyril Frederick Jones, Foreign & Commonwealth Office.
- Donald Jones, Senior Service Supervisor, West Midlands Region, British Gas Corporation.
- Frank Jones, Foreign & Commonwealth Office.
- Gerald Anthony Jones. For services to the community, particularly to youth, in Chelsea.
- Harold Molyneux Jones, Safety Officer, Rolls-Royce Motors Ltd., Crewe.
- William Roy Jones, Linesman's Mate, West Wales District, South Wales Electricity Board.
- Charles Henry Joyce, Packer, Supplies Department, Order of St. John.
- Denis John Frederick Keeling, Sub-Officer, Nottinghamshire Fire Brigade.
- Geoffrey Gerald King, Senior Professional Driver, Southern Region, British Gas Corporation.
- Margaret Kitchin, Deputy Organiser, Meals On Wheels, North Wealdon, East Sussex, Women's Royal Voluntary Service.
- Henry Raymond Laho, Supervisor, Wellington Museum, Apsley House.
- Patrick Charles Lane, Union/Management Liaison Officer, Work Study Section, Westminster City Council.
- Frederick John Lewis, Senior Instructor (Construction), Bircham Newton Training Centre.
- Elizabeth Mary Jane Lincoln, Captain, Salvation Army, Newton Aycliffe.
- Kathleen Hilda Little, lately Home Help, Birmingham City Council.
- Peter Lowe, Constable, Merseyside Police.
- James Lynch, Sergeant in Charge, Blackpool and Fleetwood, British Transport Police.
- Edna Lyte, Assistant Cook, Warwick House Grid Control Centre, Midlands Region, Central Electricity Generating Board.
- Nancy Agnes McAleese, Laundry Worker, Roe Valley Hospital, Limavady.
- Elizabeth McAllister. For service to the community in the East End of Glasgow.
- John McCabe, Station Officer, Northern Ireland Fire Service.
- John McComish, Process and General Supervisory 'C', Royal Ordnance Factory, Leeds, Ministry of Defence.
- Albert McComiskey, Sergeant, Royal Ulster Constabulary.
- Thomas McGaffin, Constable, Royal Ulster Constabulary.
- James McGinley, Electrician, Thoresby Colliery, North Notts Area, National Coal Board.
- Patricia Evadne McGrory, Telephone Supervisor, Ready Mixed Concrete Ltd.
- Euphemia Grey Mackenzie. For service to the Dalmore Eventide Home, Alness, Ross-shire.
- William McKeown, Auxiliary Constable, Northern Ireland Airports Constabulary.
- Frederick Leach McLeod, lately Blast Furnace Keeper, Shotton Works, Welsh Division, British Steel Corporation.
- Ian Macleod, Mechanician, Royal Maritime Auxiliary Service, Ministry of Defence.
- William Ivan McMurray, Constable, Royal Ulster Constabulary.
- Clement Gordon McNally, Blast Furnace Keeper, Workington Works, Sheffield Division, British Steel Corporation.
- Jean Macsween. For services to the community in Edinburgh.
- Samuel McVeigh, Senior Foreman Steelworker, Harland & Wolff.
- Richard Major (Senior), Plumber, Department of the Environment for Northern Ireland.
- Alfred Charles Fletcher Marshall, Colliery Overman, Coventry Colliery, South Midlands Area, National Coal Board.
- Henry Martin, Principal Photographer, Greater Manchester Police.
- Reginald Martin, Technician I, Foreman Metal Workshop, Science Museum.
- Archibald McKinnon Mathieson, Countryside Ranger, East Lothian District Council.
- Jean Mary Matthews, Organiser, Meals On Wheels, Bury, Women's Royal Voluntary Service.
- Peter Henry Maxwell, Tester, Instron Ltd.
- Jessie Meakin, lately Court Keeper, Lancaster Castle.
- Daisy Joyce Miller, for est Craftsman, East England Conservancy, Forestry Commission.
- Edward Mitchell, Sheet Metal Worker, IMI Marston Ltd.
- Winifred Emma Moore, Senior Technical Assistant, Ministry of Agriculture, Fisheries & Food.
- William Henry Morton, Convener, Transport & General Workers Union.
- Roy Murfin, Pipe Fitter, BP Petroleum Development Ltd., Eakring.
- Donald Nicholson, Boatswain, Peninsular & Oriental Steam Navigation Co. Ltd.
- Harold Charles Nightingale, lately Head Gardener, Royal Automobile Club Country Club, Woodcote Park, Epsom.
- Frederick Niven, lately Assistant Distribution Fitter, Dumfries, Scottish Region, British Gas Corporation.
- James Anthony Nugent, lately Chief Steward II, Ministry of Defence.
- Joseph O'Donnell, Technician Officer (Telecommunications), British Railways.
- Eric Stephen Osborne, Sergeant, Sussex Police.
- Patricia Florence Palmer, Staff Restaurant Manageress Grade C, South Eastern Telecommunications Region, The Post Office.
- Robert William Parkinson, Caretaker, Adult Education Centre, Louth.
- James Parsons, lately Operating Department Assistant, University Hospital of Wales, Cardiff.
- Joyce Amelia Parsons. For services to the care of stoma patients in the Harold Wood Area.
- Dorothy Kate Pavey, Member, League of Friends, Moorgreen Hospital, Hampshire Area Health Authority.
- Jean Lucy Pearson, District Organiser, Gainsborough, Lincolnshire Women's Royal Voluntary Service.
- Eleanor Meiriona Pink. For services to charity in Tywyn, Gwynedd.
- Marjorie Mabel Pope, District Organiser, Copeland, Women's Royal Voluntary Service.
- Edward Edgar Presley, Head Waiter, Lloyd's, London.
- David Henry Frederick Price, Fitter and Turner, HM Dockyard, HM Naval Base, Portsmouth, Ministry of Defence.
- Harcourt Herbert Pyke, Professional and Technology Officer III, Aeroplane & Armament Experimental Establishment, Boscombe Down, Ministry of Defence.
- David Kenneth Quick, Sergeant-At-Mace, Cambridge Corporation.
- Kenneth Quine, Driver, Rushen Emergency Ambulance Service, Port Erin, Isle of Man.
- Alexander Ramsay, Process Foreman, Non-Tech. I Chemical Plants, Windscale Works, British Nuclear Fuels Ltd.
- Joseph Brendon Reid, Head Driver, Bracknell Development Corporation.
- Donald Joseph Reynolds, Royal Court Usher and Chief Caretaker, St. Helier, Jersey.
- Edmund Rhodes, Farm Manager Grade IA, HM Prison Kirkham.
- Marjorie Jessie Richardson. For service to the community in the Hartlebury area.
- Edward Wood Ridley, Registered Dock Worker, Port of Tyne Authority.
- John Speller Robertson, Maintenance Officer, Ministry of Defence.
- Mabel Rogers, Foster Mother, Knowsley, Liverpool.
- Dennis Henry Andrew Cox-Rogers, Driver, The Radiochemical Centre Ltd., Amersham.
- Raymond Edward Rollinson, Chief Officer I, HM Prison Manchester.
- Albert Satterthwaite, Supervisor, Millom Depot, Copeland Borough.
- Cynthia Scott, Centre Organiser and Commandant, Ludlow Centre, Salop Branch, British Red Cross Society.
- Frank Setterich, Chief Officer Assistant, Crown Agents For Oversea Governments & Administrations.
- Abraham Sheldon, Civilian Instructor, St. Helens Unit, Sea Cadet Corps.
- Clifford Allen Sherwood, lately Dairyman, Portsea Island Mutual Co-Operative Society.
- Leslie Arthur Simonds, Committee Member, Widnes Unit, Sea Cadet Corps.
- Peter McPherson Simpson, Civilian Chef Instructor Grade 2, RAF Hereford, Ministry of Defence.
- Winifred Muriel Skinner, Sub-Postmistress, France Lynch SPSO, Stroud, Gloucestershire, South Western Postal Region, The Post Office.
- Elizabeth Euphemia Smith, lately Sub Post-Mistress, Berriedale, Caithness, Scottish Postal Board, The Post Office.
- George Stanley Austen Sodeaux, Sub-Officer, Suffolk Fire Brigade.
- Walter William Soper, lately Supervising Civilian Instructional Officer I, Royal Naval Engineering College, Ministry of Defence.
- Thomas Frederick Southwood, Security Officer, Grade 5, Department of Health & Social Security.
- Thomas Clifford Spackman, Roadsweeper, Newport, Isle of Wight County Council.
- Norman Burnett Spary, Research Section Leader, EPS (Research & Development) Ltd., Sittingbourne.
- Hugh Sproat, Special Constable, Dumfries & Galloway Constabulary.
- Douglas Haig Standen, Pests Operator, Ministry of Agriculture, Fisheries & Food.
- Arthur Stanton, Supervisor, Out Workers and Sheltered Workshops, Unicorn Products Ltd. For services to export.
- Joseph Anderson Stead, Sub-Officer, Strathclyde Fire Brigade.
- Robert William Stone, Senior Plant Engineer, University of London.
- Iris Elsie Storey, Telephonist, Naval Ship Production Overseers Office (West Midlands), Birmingham, Ministry of Defence.
- Florence Marie Summerfield, Supervisor, Heal & Son Ltd., London W.I.
- John Allenby Talbot, Sergeant, Metropolitan Police.
- May Lilian Taylor, Progress Clerk, Charles S. Green & Co. Ltd.
- Joe Defaidty Tee, Shepherd, Rhiwlas Estate, Bala, Gwynedd.
- George Melville Thomas, Experimental Worker Grade II, Royal Aircraft Establishment, Aberporth, Ministry of Defence.
- Arthur Walter Thompson, lately Chargehand, Metropolitan Police.
- Magnus Thomson, Boatswain, General Service Contracts, Messrs. George Gibson & Co. Ltd.
- Patrick Albert Thurston, Constable, Metropolitan Police.
- Barbara Elfrida Tonks, Deputy Metropolitan District Organiser, Walsall, West Midlands, Women's Royal Voluntary Service.
- William Gordon Towell, Senior Officer, Rochester Borstal.
- Frank Toy, Foreman, Remploy, Redruth, Cornwall.
- Frederick Maurice William. Tuckey, Senior Foreman Inspector, General Electric Co. Machines Ltd., Rugby.
- Barbara Underwood, Supervisor, Winding Department, S. Lyles Sons & Co. Ltd., Dewsbury.
- Harry Daniel Wallin, Office Keeper II, Board of Inland Revenue.
- Charles Cameron Ward, Senior Paperkeeper, Patent Office.
- Irene Mary Ward, Supervisor of Telephonists, Welsh Office.
- Eleanor Patricia Warnock, Senior Home Economist, Northern Ireland Electricity Service.
- Gladys Warriner, Assistant Commandant, Detachment 90, Hull Centre, Humberside Branch, British Red Cross Society.
- Tony George Watson, Regimental Sergeant Major and School Staff Instructor, Eastbourne College, Combined Cadet Force.
- Sidney John Watts, Mill Foreman, Allied Mills Ltd., Tewkesbury.
- Andrew Waugh, Postman Higher Grade, Leicester HPO, Midlands Region, The Post Office.
- Robert Weatherley, Body Builder, Scammell Motors.
- Emily Catherine Webb, Cleaner, Royal Courts of Justice.
- Horace Webb, Senior Shop Steward, Lucas Girling Ltd, Cwmbran.
- Ella Rose West, School Crossing Patrol, Metropolitan Police.
- Francis Robert Ernest West, Process and General Supervisory Grade 'C', Cinque Ports Training Area, Ministry of Defence.
- Mabel Weston, for services to the blind and partially sighted in Bournemouth.
- Joyce Mary White, District Organiser, Gosport, Women's Royal Voluntary Service.
- George Henry Wilkins, Platform Controller, Birmingham Branch, Roadline UK Ltd.
- John Wilkinson, Senior Designer, Warton Division, Aircraft Group, British Aerospace, Warton.
- Donald Frank Willey, Driver, HM Stationery Office.
- Henry Leonard Williams, Senior Storekeeper, Maritime Headquarters, Pitreavie, Ministry of Defence.
- John Robertson Williams, General Foreman, Estates Department, Broomhill and Shilbottle District, North East Area, National Coal Board.
- Kenneth Williams, Foreman, Transport Work Shops, Eastern Central Engineering Services, South Wales Electricity Board.
- Crawford Wilson, Service Engineer, Carluke, Scottish Region, British Gas Corporation.
- Alan Sydney Wolfe, Professional Technology Officer Grade III, Royal Armament Research & Development Establishment, Ministry of Defence.
- Edward Mayes Young, Convenor (UCATT), for MICA Ltd.

Overseas Territories

- Francis Earl Victor Unoldar Antonio, Agricultural Assistant Grade I, Department of Agriculture, Antigua.
- Albert Brooks, Senior Boarding Officer, Marine Department, Gibraltar.
- Chow Lam-Pang, Senior Field Assistant, Agriculture Department, Hong Kong.
- Chiu Allan Ching, Senior Clerical Officer, Police Department, Hong Kong.
- Chu Man-Yui, Liaison Officer Class I, Auxiliary Medical Service, Hong Kong.
- Fok Hin-Kwong, Law Clerk, Legal Aid Department, Hong Kong.
- Kan James Kam-Fook, Senior Clerical Officer, Attorney-General's Department, Hong Kong.
- Lau Kam-Kwong, Chauffeur, Transport Department, Hong Kong.
- Lo Chi-Wah, Receptionist, Government Secretariat, Hong Kong.
- Leonard Rolland Manser, Dean's Verger, Anglican Cathedral, Gibraltar.
- Ng Muk-Kah. For public services in Hong Kong.
- Pang Kwai-Cheong, Clerical Officer Class I, Registration of Persons Office, Hong Kong.
- Pang Shuk-Keung, Chief Meter Reader, Water Supplies Department, Hong Kong.
- Eugene Williams, Head Gardener, Government House, Port Stanley, Falkland Islands.

Australian States

State of Victoria

- Dorothea Alcock, of East Keilor. For community service.
- Kenneth Nutter Baldwin, of Greensborough. For service to Youth.
- Helen Emily Chandler, of Seville. For community service.
- David Samuel Davis, of Balwyn. For service to Returned Servicemen.
- Percy Trenear Du Bourg, of Maryborough. For community service.
- Mavis Laureen Durham, of Black Rock. For service to Music.
- Clara Alma Finnise, of Cheltenham. For service to Education.
- Allan Ray Gibbins, of Essendon. For service to Ballroom Dancing.
- Walter Stanley Guppy, of Preston. For service to Returned Servicemen.
- Gwynneth Dorothy Harris, of Lockington. For community service.
- Edith Gwendolyn Jenkins, of Brighton East. For community service.
- Reginald John Kilpatrick, of Doncaster. For public service.
- Mary Neville Krutli, of Maryborough. For community service.
- Ormond Joffre Metcher, of Seaford. For service to Surf Lifesaving.
- Archibald Frederick Montfort, of West Bruns Wick. For service to the Scout Movement.
- Elizabeth Ellinor Jane Morcom, of Ballarat. For service to Music.
- George Ralph O'Brien, of Pascoe Vale. For community service.
- Thelma Rose Pead, of Doncaster. For community service.
- Bettine Mary Pullen, of Mount Eliza. For community service.
- William Edwin Stokes, MC, of Echuca. For community service.
- George Frederick Tilley, of Mildura. For community service.
- Florence Amelia Tucker, of Ivanhoe. For community service.
- Estelle May Waterman, of Bendigo. For service to Netball.
- Frank Wilson, of Boolarra. For community service.

State of Queensland

- Mary Boyle, of Peak Crossing. For services to the community.
- Thomas Neil Callaghan, of Bundaberg. For services to the community and the grazing industry.
- John William Flower, of Dalby. For services to Journalism and the community.
- Joan Foley, of Bardon. For services to Nursing.
- Henrietta Gladys Jones, of Coorparoo. For services to the community.
- Wilhelmina Mary Cochrane Wallace Lyon, of Yeronga. For services to nursing.
- Beatrice Marion McCarthy, of Main Beach. For services to nursing and the community.
- Sydney Thomas Orchard, of Blackall. For services to the community.
- Nancy Agnes Pinner, of Wellington Point. For public service.
- George Frank Jekyll Robinson, of Jandowae. For services to the community.
- The Reverend Thomas Tipper Scarlett, of New Farm. For services to the church and the community.
- Clarice Maud Todd, of Ayr. For services to the Aged.

State of South Australia

- Eva Annie Bell, of Windsor Gardens. For community service in an outback area.
- Beryl Ivy Fegan, of Eden Hills. For services to the St. John Council for South Australia.
- Sid Goodfellow, of Magill. For services to charity.
- Peter Allen Malpas, of Fulham. For community service.
- Gordon Ambrose James Miller, of Willunga. For community service.
- Douglas Lewis Mitchell, of Millicent. For community service.

State of Western Australia

- Jesse James Ernest Archdeacon, of Scarborough. For community service.
- Clara Edith Brockman, of Busselton. For service to the community.
- Gladys Elizabeth Brooks, of Koorda. For service to the community.
- Marjorie Lindsay Copley, of Daglish. For service to the community.
- Bernard Joseph Flanagan, of Floreat Park. For service to the community.
- Ella Louise Hamersley, of Walkaway. For service to the community.
- Alan Clement Lewis, of Mount Hawthorn. For service to the community.
- Margaret Mary Macnish, of Bunbury. For service to the community.
- Richard Charles Walter, of South Perth. For service to Horticulture.

=== Royal Red Cross ===
- Lieutenant Colonel (now Major) Sheila Coates (455607), Queen Alexandra's Royal Army Nursing Corps, Territorial Army.
- Lieutenant Colonel Margaret Lenore Hampshire (470546), Queen Alexandra's Royal Army Nursing Corps, Territorial Army.
- Colonel Elizabeth Mary Lee (423453), Queen Alexandra's Royal Army Nursing Corps.
- Colonel Betty Sawyer, ARRC, (434154), Queen Alexandra's Royal Army Nursing Corps.

==== Associate of the Royal Red Cross Second Class ====
- Superintending Sister Margaret Mary Moore, Queen Alexandra's Royal Naval Nursing Service.
- Major Philip Reginald Basford (489134), Royal Army Medical Corps.
- Lieutenant Colonel Mavis Lloyd Plant (492496), Queen Alexandra's Royal Army Nursing Corps, Territorial Army (now RARO).
- Major Margaret Tess Rees (446049), Queen Alexandra's Royal Army Nursing Corps.
- Captain Elizabeth Joan Viner (486585), Queen Alexandra's Royal Army Nursing Corps.

=== Air Force Cross ===
Royal Navy

- Acting Commander Michael Hope.
- Lieutenant Commander Christopher Johnson.
- Lieutenant Commander David Edward Penrose Baston.

Royal Air Force

- Wing Commander Robert Fowler (206699).
- Wing Commander Joseph Kerr Sim (608065).
- Squadron Leader George Graham Cullington (2618908).
- Squadron Leader Harold Malcolm Grosse (4231435).
- Squadron Leader Anthony Victor Bawden Hawken (608442).
- Squadron Leader Graham Paul Young (4235483).
- Flight Lieutenant David William Linney (4233480).
- Flight Lieutenant Roger Steven Munyard (4260982).
- Flight Lieutenant Peter Frederick Smout (5200788).
- Flight Lieutenant Donald Leslie James Thomas (4232000) (Ret'd).
- Flight Lieutenant Ninian Ranald James Wingate (506982).

=== Queen's Police Medal ===
England and Wales

- Harold Archibald Blackburn, Detective Chief Superintendent, Kent Constabulary.
- Fred Theodore Chambers, Deputy Chief Constable, Northumbria Police.
- Norman Charles Sydney Cooper, Chief Superintendent, Sussex Police.
- Eric Frank Ellen, Chief Constable, Port of London Authority Police.
- Leonard Arthur Gillert, Commander, Metropolitan Police.
- David John Graham, Deputy Chief Constable, Cheshire Constabulary.
- Kenneth Henshaw, Chief Constable, North Yorkshire Police.
- Bernard Edwin Hotson, Chief Superintendent, Cambridgeshire Constabulary.
- Peter Michael Imbert, Chief Constable, Thames Valley Police.
- William Cyril Mathews, Commander, Metropolitan Police.
- Francis Joseph McGuinness, Commander, Metropolitan Police.
- Robert Henry O'Hanlon, Deputy Chief Constable, Staffordshire Police.
- Walter Eric Charles Real, Chief Superintendent, Lancashire Constabulary.
- George Kelynack Richards, Assistant Chief Constable, South Wales Constabulary.
- Stephen Charles Vessey, Chief Superintendent, Lincolnshire Police.

Northern Ireland

- George Wesley Porter, Inspector, Royal Ulster Constabulary.

Overseas Territories

- Frederick Colburn Bean, CPM, Deputy Commissioner of Police, Bermuda Police Force.
- Geoffrey David Carter, CPM, Assistant Commissioner of Police, Royal Hong Kong Police Force.
- Joseph Charles Morello, CPM, Deputy Commissioner of Police, Gibraltar Police Force.
- Ronald Stanley Williams, Commissioner of Police, Gibraltar Police Force.

Australian States

State of Victoria

- Lyell John Blogg, Chief Inspector, Victoria Police Service.
- Alexander Cameron, Senior Sergeant, Victoria Police Service.
- John Christopher Carey, Chief Inspector, Victoria Police Service.
- Edward Francis Johns, Senior Sergeant, Victoria Police Service.
- Bryan Thomas Kelly, Inspector, Victoria Police Service.
- Eric Neil Shuey, Chief Superintendent, Victoria Police Service.

State of Queensland

- Kevin Gerhard Flanagan, Superintendent, Queensland Police Force.
- Rupert Armstrong Gillespie, Superintendent, Queensland Police Force.
- Keith Thomas Harris, Superintendent, Queensland Police Force.
- Leslie Thomas Hogan, Superintendent, Queensland Police Force.
- Kevin William Monaghan, Superintendent, Queensland Police Force.
- Patrick Edward Quinn, Superintendent, Queensland Police Force.

State of South Australia

- Robert Cromwell Chivell, Chief Superintendent, South Australia Police Force.
- Colin George Wilson, Chief Superintendent, South Australia Police Force.

State of Western Australia

- Kenneth Gordon Browne, Assistant Commissioner, Western Australia Police Force.
- Robert Leslie Kenward, Assistant Commissioner, Western Australia Police Force.

State of Tasmania

- Terence William Cashion, Detective Inspector, Tasmania Police Force.
- Bryan Bagnall Richardson, Superintendent, Tasmania Police Force.

Scotland

- Norman Macleod, Deputy Chief Constable, Central Scotland Police.
- Alexander Morrison, Deputy Chief Constable, Strathclyde Police.

=== Queen's Fire Service Medal ===
England & Wales

- Eric Arthur Brown, Assistant Chief Officer, West Midlands Fire Service.
- Michael John Doherty, Chief Staff Officer, London Fire Brigade.
- Norman William Gerald Langley, Assistant Chief Officer, Cumbria Fire Brigade.
- John Campbell Maxwell, OBE DFC, Deputy Commandant/Senior Course Director, Fire Service Staff College.
- Dennis Frederick Robins, Chief Fire Officer, Wiltshire Fire Brigade.
- Robert Henry Russell, Chief Fire Officer, Salop Fire Brigade.
- Arthur Steel, Chief Fire Officer, Northamptonshire Fire Brigade.

Scotland

- William Harper, Deputy Firemaster, Strathclyde Fire Brigade.

Australian States

State of Victoria

- Derrick Albert Austin, ED, Group Officer, Victoria Country Fire Authority.
- Maurice Eric Johnson, Captain, Maryvale Rural Fire Brigade.
- Peter Lang, Senior Station Officer, Norlane Urban Fire Brigade.
- Patrick George Mullins, Captain, Maryborough Urban Fire Brigade.

State of South Australia

- Mervyn Clyde Gully, BEM, Senior Superintendent, South Australia Fire Brigade.
- Colin Stanley Morphett, Deputy Chief Officer, South Australia Fire Brigade.

=== Colonial Police Medal ===
- George Borrell, Constable, Gibraltar Police Force.
- Brian Henry Boyton, Chief Inspector of Police, Royal Hong Kong Police Force.
- John Ashton Bredbury, Senior Divisional Officer, Hong Kong Fire Services.
- Garth Stopher Burrows, Chief Inspector of Police, Royal Hong Kong Police Force.
- Siu-Tong Chan, Constable, Royal Hong Kong Police Force.
- Chang-Kong Choi, Assistant Divisional Officer, Hong Kong Fire Services.
- Geoffrey Howard Cox, Superintendent of Police, Royal Hong Kong Police Force.
- Reginald Crawford, Chief Inspector of Police, Gibraltar Police Force.
- Clive Joseph Evans, Senior Superintendent of Police, Royal Hong Kong Police Force.
- Charles Holdrich Fisher, Chief Inspector of Police, Royal Hong Kong Police Force.
- Victor Maurice Green, Senior Superintendent of Police, Royal Hong Kong Police Force.
- Alastair William Jamieson Gunn, Superintendent of Police, Royal Hong Kong Police Force.
- Brian Haigh, Chief Superintendent of Police, Royal Hong Kong Police Force.
- Gordon Jack, Senior Superintendent of Police, Royal Hong Kong Police Force.
- King Kong, Principal Fireman, Hong Kong Fire Services.
- Lionel Kin Lam, Superintendent of Police, Royal Hong Kong Police Force.
- Shu-Piu Leung, Station Sergeant of Police, Royal Hong Kong Police Force.
- James McNiven, Chief Inspector of Police, Bermuda Police Force.
- Hon-Wing Ng, Superintendent of Police, Royal Hong Kong Auxiliary Police Force.
- John Edwin Over, Senior Assistant Commissioner of Police, Royal Hong Kong Police Force.
- Hector Andrew Payas, Superintendent of Police, Gibraltar Police Force.
- Mario Payas, Detective Inspector of Police, Gibraltar Police Force.
- Charles Michael Murray Polson, Sergeant of Police, Gibraltar Police Force.
- Wing So, Principal Fireman, Hong Kong Fire Services.
- Edward Forster Taylor, Senior Superintendent of Police, Royal Hong Kong Police Force.
- Shek-Chuen To, Sergeant of Police, Royal Hong Kong Police Force.
- John Turner, Senior Superintendent of Police, Royal Hong Kong Police Force.
- Hector McDonald Whitton, Superintendent of Police, Royal Hong Kong Police Force.
- Robert Moffat Wilkinson, Inspector of Police, Royal Hong Kong Police Force.
- Shu-Piu Wong, Station Sergeant of Police, Royal Hong Kong Police Force.
- Wai-Ho Wong, Sergeant of Police, Royal Hong Kong Auxiliary Police Force.
- Kwan-Kuen Woo, Senior Divisional Officer, Hong Kong Fire Services.
- Siu-Fan Yau, Chief Inspector of Police, Royal Hong Kong Police Force.

=== Queen's Commendation For Valuable Service in the Air ===
Army

- 23251028 Warrant Officer Class 2 Michael John Sharp, Army Air Corps.

Royal Air Force

- Squadron Leader Philip Howard Batty (2220759).
- Squadron Leader Alan Ferguson (608510).
- Squadron Leader George Stanton Foster (4164077).
- Squadron Leader David Frank Andrew Henderson (608892).
- Squadron Leader Clive Graham Jefford (4230702).
- Squadron Leader Kenneth Peter Orme, AFC, (2619273).
- Squadron Leader Gordon Robert Spate (508359).
- Squadron Leader Philip Oliver Sturley (5200847).
- Squadron Leader Alan Threadgould (4232797).
- Squadron Leader John Keith Walters (2617290).
- Acting Squadron Leader Michael Henry Dobson (608749).
- Flight Lieutenant Michael Robert Alcock (4232286), (Ret'd).
- Flight Lieutenant William Richard Burborough (4275058).
- Flight Lieutenant Alastair David Gloag (2619882).
- Flight Lieutenant William George Hercus (682785), (Ret'd).
- Flight Lieutenant John Warris Hodgson (4231851).
- Flight Lieutenant Julian Michael Leigh (4232718).
- Flight Lieutenant Matthew Kernohan Millar (4232846).
- Flight Lieutenant Roland Cecil Mitchell (583267).
- Flight Lieutenant Alan Lamont Donald Munro (2617937).
- Master Air Electronics Operator George Bertie Copsey (Q4012917).
- Master Air Load-Master John Freeland Hanrahan (A3529407).

== Australia ==
The Queen's Birthday Honours for Australia were announced on 14 June 1980, and included appointments to the Order of Australia, Order of the Bath, Order of St Michael and St George and Order of the British Empire, as well as awards of the British Empire Medal, Queen's Police Medal, Royal Red Cross, Air Force Cross, Air Force Medal and Queen's Commendation for Valuable Service in the Air.

== Mauritius ==
=== Order of Saint Michael and Saint George ===
==== Companion of the Order of St Michael and St George (CMG) ====
- Bramduth Ghoorah, MVO, Secretary to the Cabinet and Head of the Civil Service.

=== Order of the British Empire ===
==== Commander of the Order of the British Empire (CBE) ====
Civil Division

- Pierre Elysee Michel Doger de Speville. For services to agro-industrial development.

==== Officer of the Order of the British Empire (OBE) ====
Civil Division

- Ganee Moossa. For services to commerce and industry.
- Devarajen Soopramanien, Financial Secretary.

==== Member of the Order of the British Empire (MBE) ====
Civil Division

- Rohit Boolakee. For community service.
- Joseph Martial Henri Catherine. For services to primary education.
- Paul Elysee. For port services in island of Rodrigues.
- Bijmohun Horeesorun. For community service.
- Hamjah Nowrung. For community service.

=== Companion of the Imperial Service Order (ISO) ===
- Pierre Michel Laval Ahkong, Adviser, National Pensions, Ministry of Social Security.

=== Mauritius Police Medal ===
- Gowtan Choychoo, Chief Inspector, Mauritius Police Force.
- Andre Maurice Lagaite, Paymaster, Mauritius Police Force.
- Dharma Naggea, Inspector, Mauritius Police Force.
- Narainkrishna Peerun, Sergeant, Mauritius Police Force.

== Fiji ==
=== Order of the British Empire ===
==== Knight Commander of the Order of the British Empire (KBE) ====
Civil Division

- John Maynard Hedstrom, CBE. For public and community service.
- Ratu Jone Latianara Kikau, MBE. For public and community service.
- Sethi Narain, MBE. For public and community service.

==== Commander of the Order of the British Empire (CBE) ====
Civil Division

- Ratu Josua Brown Toganivalu, Fiji High Commissioner to New Zealand.

==== Officer of the Order of the British Empire (OBE) ====
Military Division

- Captain (Temporary Lieutenant Colonel) James Norman Sanday, Commanding Officer, 1st Battalion, Fiji Infantry Regiment, with UNIFIL.

Civil Division

- Kishor Nand Govind. For service to the community.
- Harold Picton-Smith. For public service in the field of law.
- Ratu Henry Barkeley Vakaruru Qasevakatini. For medical public service.

==== Member of the Order of the British Empire (MBE) ====
Civil Division

- Eunice Anamma Madhavan. For community service.
- Thomas Fowler Pickering. For services to industry and the community.
- Manikam Vasagam Pillai. For services to the community.
- Solomone Ravasakula. For services to the community.
- Ratu Imanueli Lauvatu Vosailagi. For services to the community.

=== Companion of the Imperial Service Order (ISO) ===
- Mahendra Chandra Vinod. Recently Principal, Fiji College of Agriculture.

=== British Empire Medal (BEM) ===
Civil Division

- Laisiasa Roko. Senior Fisheries Assistant.

=== Queen's Police Medal ===
For Distinguished Service

- Chandra Deo Sharma, Senior Superintendent, Royal Fiji Police Force.
- Meli Vakarewakobau, Assistant Commissioner, Royal Fiji Police Force.

== Bahamas ==
=== Order of the British Empire ===
==== Member of the Order of the British Empire (MBE) ====
Civil Division

- The Reverend Herbert Othneal Ferguson. For service to religion and the community.
- Andrew Bruce Johnson, Assistant General Manager, Bahamas Telecommunications Corporation.

=== British Empire Medal (BEM) ===
Civil Division

- Ronald Duncombe. For service to the community.
- Elvin Granville Fowler, Senior Security Officer, Ministry of Works and Utilities.

== Papua New Guinea ==
=== Knight Bachelor ===
- Wamp Wan, MBE. For community service.

=== Order of Saint Michael and Saint George ===
==== Companion of the Order of St Michael and St George (CMG) ====
- Paulias Matane, OBE, Head of Papua New Guinea Mission to the United Nations.

=== Order of the British Empire ===
==== Knight Commander of the Order of the British Empire (KBE) ====
Civil Division

- The Most Reverend Louis Vangeke, OBE, lately Bishop of Bereina.

==== Dame Commander of the Order of the British Empire (DBE) ====
Civil Division

- Rachel, Lady Cleland, CBE, For services to the community.

==== Commander of the Order of the British Empire (CBE) ====
Civil Division

- John Natera. For public service in the field of agriculture.
- Robert Henry Seeto. For services to the community.
- The Honourable Oscar Tammur, MBE MP, For services to politics and government.

==== Officer of the Order of the British Empire (OBE) ====
Military Division

- Colonel Duncan MacKenzie Michael Francis, (Royal Australian Engineers) (335103). Chief of Staff, Papua New Guinea Defence Force.

Civil Division

- Pama Anio. For services to the community.
- Herbert Stewart Craig. For services to agriculture and the community.
- Edwin George Hicks. For public service.
- Nambuga Mara. For services to local and provincial government.
- Edward Hasu Moava. For services to the community.
- Jacob Talis. For services to the community.
- Ilinome Frank Tarua. For public service.

==== Member of the Order of the British Empire (MBE) ====
Military Division

- Warrant Officer Roger Kipo (83654), Papua New Guinea Defence Force.

Civil Division

- Kila Amini. For services to YMCA and to women.
- George Oswald Thomas Blacker. For services to banking.
- Inu Dai. For services to banking and the community.
- Tegi Ebefal. For services to the community.
- Ronald Allan Hiatt. For public service.
- Reverend Brother Peter Hilary Keaga. For services to education.
- John Thomas Keating. For services to golf.
- Sabumei Kofikai. For services to the community.
- Noglai Kora. For services to local and provincial government.
- Theresia Niawesew Paliau. For services to the community.
- Momei Pangial. For services to the community.
- Antony Howard Marlow Reed. For services to scouting.
- Asi Masi Rei. For community services.
- Chief Superintendent John Daltoft Revill. For services to the Royal Papua New Guinea Constabulary.
- James Edward Seeto. For services to the community.
- Materua Tamarua. For services to education.

=== Companion of the Imperial Service Order (ISO) ===
- William George, BEM, Assistant Secretary, Department of Commerce, Central Provincial Government.
- David John Stewart, General Manager, Copra Marketing Board of Papua New Guinea.

=== British Empire Medal (BEM) ===
Military Division

- Corporal Joseph Koliwasi Jaba, (81763), Papua New Guinea Defence Force.

Civil Division

- Wainetti Anagogo. For services to public health.
- Sergeant Warbongoi Peter Tukar, For services to the Royal Papua New Guinea Constabulary.

== Solomon Islands ==
=== Order of the British Empire ===
==== Officer of the Order of the British Empire (OBE) ====
Civil Division

- Benedict Kinika, Minister of Finance.
- Bertram John Fletcher Russell, Permanent Secretary, Ministry of Agriculture and Lands.

==== Member of the Order of the British Empire (MBE) ====
Civil Division

- Sister Paul Francis McGee. For services in the medical field.
- Bishop Casper Uka, Assistant Bishop of Central Melanesia.

=== British Empire Medal (BEM) ===
Civil Division

- Jemuel Afia. For services to religion.
- Mathew Belamatanga. For service to the community.
- Gordon Pabulu. For service to the community.

== Tuvalu ==
=== Order of the British Empire ===
==== Officer of the Order of the British Empire (OBE) ====
Civil Division

- Kamuta Latasi. Tuvalu High Commissioner to Fiji.

== Saint Lucia ==
=== Order of the British Empire ===
==== Member of the Order of the British Empire (MBE) ====
Civil Division

- Donald Clarence Alcee. For public service.
- Vincent Edmund Glasgow. For services to the community.

=== British Empire Medal (BEM) ===
Civil Division

- Jessie Medouze. For services to teaching and the community.
- Irene Mondesir. For services to teaching and the community.

== Saint Vincent and the Grenadines ==
=== Order of the British Empire ===
==== Knight Commander of the Order of the British Empire (KBE) ====
Civil Division

- His Grace George Cuthbert Manning Woodroffe, CBE, Archbishop of the West Indies.

==== Commander of the Order of the British Empire (CBE) ====
Civil Division

- O'Neill Newsam McIntosh, CPM. For services to commerce and the community.

==== Officer of the Order of the British Empire (OBE) ====
Civil Division

- Frank Gilbert Thomas. For public service and services to cricket.
- Philip Henry Veira. For services to industry, commerce and the community.

==== Member of the Order of the British Empire (MBE) ====
Civil Division

- Celina Ethlyn Questelles. For services to nursing and the community.
