= Joseph Burke (art historian) =

British art historian (1913 – 1992)

Sir Joseph Terence Burke OBE KBE (14 July 1913 – 25 March 1992) was a British art historian.

He was born in Ealing, London and educated at King's College London, where he graduated in English language and literature. He undertook his postgraduate studies at the Courtauld Institute of Art and Yale University, where he obtained MAs from both. Afterwards he was appointed lecturer for the University of Cambridge Board of Extra-Mural Studies and in 1938 was made Assistant Keeper at the Victoria and Albert Museum.

Upon the outbreak of the Second World War in 1939, Burke was appointed secretary to the Lord President of the Council, an office he held throughout the war. During 1945–1946 he was Private Secretary to the Prime Minister, Clement Attlee.

In 1947 he was appointed the first Herald Professor of Fine Arts at the University of Melbourne, which he held until 1979. He was President of the Australian Academy of the Humanities from 1971 until 1974.

In the 1980 Birthday Honours he was appointed a Knight Commander of the Order of the British Empire for service to the arts.<

== Works ==
- Hogarth and Reynolds: A Contrast in English Art Theory (Oxford: Oxford University Press, 1943).
- Hogarth: The Complete Engravings, co-authored with Colin Caldwell (London: Thames and Hudson, 1968).
- English Art 1714–1800 (Oxford: Oxford University Press, 1976).
