= Austin Pearce =

British businessman (1921–2004)

Sir Austin "William" Pearce CBE (1 September 1921 – 21 March 2004) was the chairman of British Aerospace from 1980 until 1987. He was educated at Devonport High School for Boys, Plymouth and the University of Birmingham.

In 1942 he left university with a degree in Chemical Engineering and joined the Petroleum Warfare Department working on incendiary devices at the same time as his doctorate.

He began his industrial career with the Agwi Petroleum Corporartion. When this became part of Esso he rose rapidly, eventually becoming managing director in 1968. In retirement he continued to hold important posts such as the Prochancellorship of the University of Surrey.

Pearce was knighted in the 1980 Birthday Honours.
