= Jone Kikau =

Fijian chief, civil servant and politician

Member of the Senate
- In office 1973–1979

Personal details
- Died: 3 August 1984 (aged 75) Suva, Fiji

Ratu Sir Jone Latianara Kikau KBE JP (died 3 August 1984) was a Fijian chief, civil servant and politician. He served as a member of the Senate from 1973 to 1979.

== Biography ==
Originally from Bau, Kikau joined the civil service in 1936 as a provincial scribe. He was promoted to Roko in 1949, also becoming a magistrate. In 1952 he was appointed Roko Tui, serving in Ra, Lomaiviti and Tailevu until he retired in 1967. He also served on the Native Land Trust Board.

He was awarded an MBE in the 1968 New Year Honours, and was appointed to the Senate as one of the Great Council of Chiefs nominees, serving until 1979. He was knighted in the 1980 Birthday Honours and died in Suva in August 1984.
